= Tina Kover =

American literary translator

Tina Kover (born March 20, 1975, in Denver, Colorado, US) is an American-British literary translator. She studied French at the University of Denver and the University of Lausanne, Switzerland, and attended the Next Level Language Institute in Prague, Czech Republic. She holds a Master's Degree in Medieval and Renaissance Studies from Durham University.

Her translation of Négar Djavadi's award-winning novel Disoriental was a finalist for the inaugural National Book Award for Translated Literature in 2018, the PEN Translation Prize in 2019, the Scott Moncrieff Prize, the Warwick Prize for Women in Translation, and the International Dublin Literary Award. Disoriental was awarded both the Albertine Prize and the Lambda Literary Award for Bisexual Fiction in June 2019.

Older Brother was a finalist for the Oxford-Weidenfeld Translation Prize in 2020.

Her translation of Manette Salomon by the Goncourt Brothers won her a National Endowment for the Arts Literature Fellowship in 2009.

Her translation of In the Shadow of the Fire was selected for a French Voices Award in 2020.

She is the co-founder, with Charlotte Coombe, of the YouTube channel Translators Aloud, which features literary translators reading from their own work. Contributors have included Jennifer Croft, Daniel Hahn, Antonia Lloyd-Jones, Ros Schwartz, and Frank Wynne.

== List of translated works ==
The Bookshop of Forbidden Books, Marc Levy, Firefinch, London, 2026
These Blazing Suns, Nincemon Fallé, Europa Editions, New York & London, 2026
The Very Secretive and Passionate Stella Miles Franklin, Alexandra Lapierre, Europa Editions, New York & London, 2026
Symphony of Monsters, Marc Levy, HarperVia, New York, 2026
Gabriële, Anne Berest and Claire Berest, Europa Editions, New York & London, 2025
The Ogre's Daughter, Catherine Bardon, Europa Editions, New York & London, 2024
Lenin Walked on the Moon, Michel Eltchaninoff, Europa Editions, New York & London, 2023
The Postcard, Anne Berest, Europa Editions, New York & London, 2023
Belle Greene: A Novel, Alexandra Lapierre, Europa Editions, New York, 2022
Blue, Emmelie Prophète, Amazon Crossing, Seattle, 2022
No Touching, Ketty Rouf, Europa Editions, New York & London, 2021
The Science of Middle-earth, Lehoucq, Mangin, & Steyer, eds., Pegasus Books, New York, 2021
In the Shadow of the Fire, Hervé le Corre, Europa Editions, New York & London, 2021
A Beast in Paradise, Cécile Coulon, Europa Editions, New York & London, 2021
Paridaiza, Luis de Miranda, Snuggly Books, Sacramento, 2020
Older Brother, Mahir Guven, Europa Editions, New York & London, 2019
A Summer with Montaigne, Antoine Compagnon, Europa Editions, New York & London, 2019
The Little Girl on the Ice Floe, Adélaïde Bon, Europa Editions, New York, 2019
Disoriental, Négar Djavadi, Europa Editions, New York & London, 2018
Manette Salomon, Edmond de Goncourt and Jules de Goncourt, Snuggly Books, Sacramento, 2017
The Beauty of the Death Cap, Catherine Dousteyssier-Khoze, Snuggly Books, Sacramento, 2017
Who Killed the Poet?, Luis de Miranda, Snuggly Books, Sacramento, 2017
Life, Only Better, Anna Gavalda, Europa Editions, New York & London, 2015
The Faces of God, Mallock, Europa Editions, New York & London, 2015
Herge: Son of Tintin, Benoit Peeters, Johns Hopkins University Press, Baltimore, 2011
Venus, Auguste Rodin, Hol Art Books, Tucson, 2010
Liquid Memory: Why Wine Matters, Jonathan Nossiter, Farrar, Straus, & Giroux, New York, 2009
Grand Junction, Maurice G. Dantec, Del Rey Books, New York, 2009
Cosmos Incorporated, Maurice G. Dantec, Del Rey Books, New York, 2008
Georges, Alexandre Dumas, Random House/Modern Library, New York, 2007
The Black City, George Sand, Carroll & Graf/Avalon Publishing, New York, 2004
