= Francis Picabia =

French painter and writer (1879–1953)

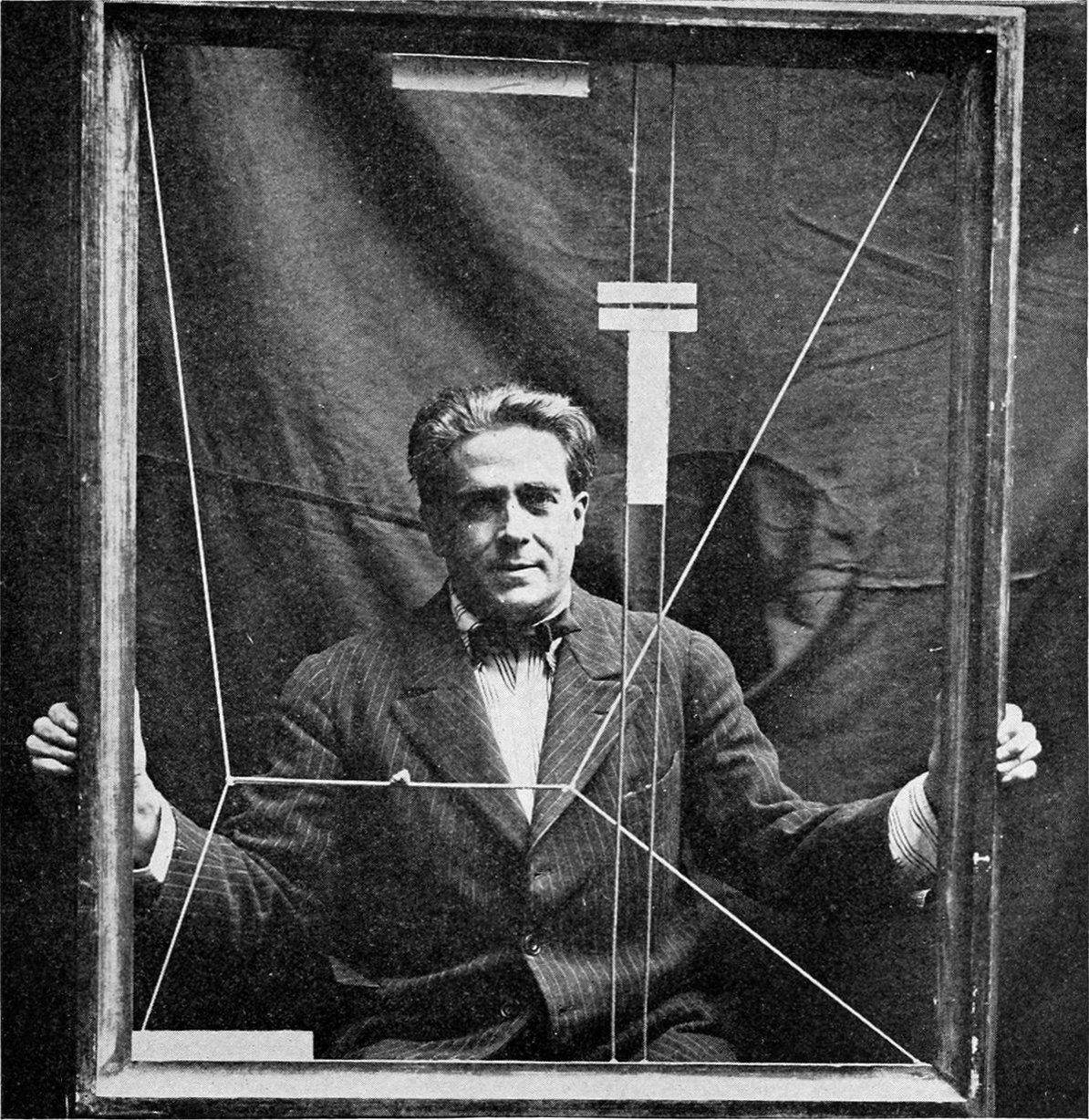
- Francis Picabia, 1919, inside Danse de Saint-Guy
- Born: Francis-Marie Martinez Picabia; 22 January 1879; Paris, France
- Died: 30 November 1953 (aged 74); Paris, France
- Known for: Painting
- Notable work: Amorous Parade
- Movement: Cubism, abstract art, Dada, Surrealism
- Spouse: Gabrièle Buffet-Picabia

Francis Picabia (French: [fʁɑ̃sis pikabja]: born Francis-Marie Martinez de Picabia; 22 January 1879 – 30 November 1953) was a French avant-garde painter, writer, filmmaker, magazine publisher, poet, and typographist closely associated with Dada.

When considering the many styles that Picabia painted in, observers have described his career as "shape-shifting" or "kaleidoscopic". After experimenting with Impressionism and Pointillism, Picabia became associated with Cubism. His highly abstract planar compositions were colourful and rich in contrasts. He was one of the early major figures of the Dada movement in the United States and in France before denouncing it in 1921. He was later briefly associated with Surrealism, but would soon turn his back on the art establishment.

== Early life ==
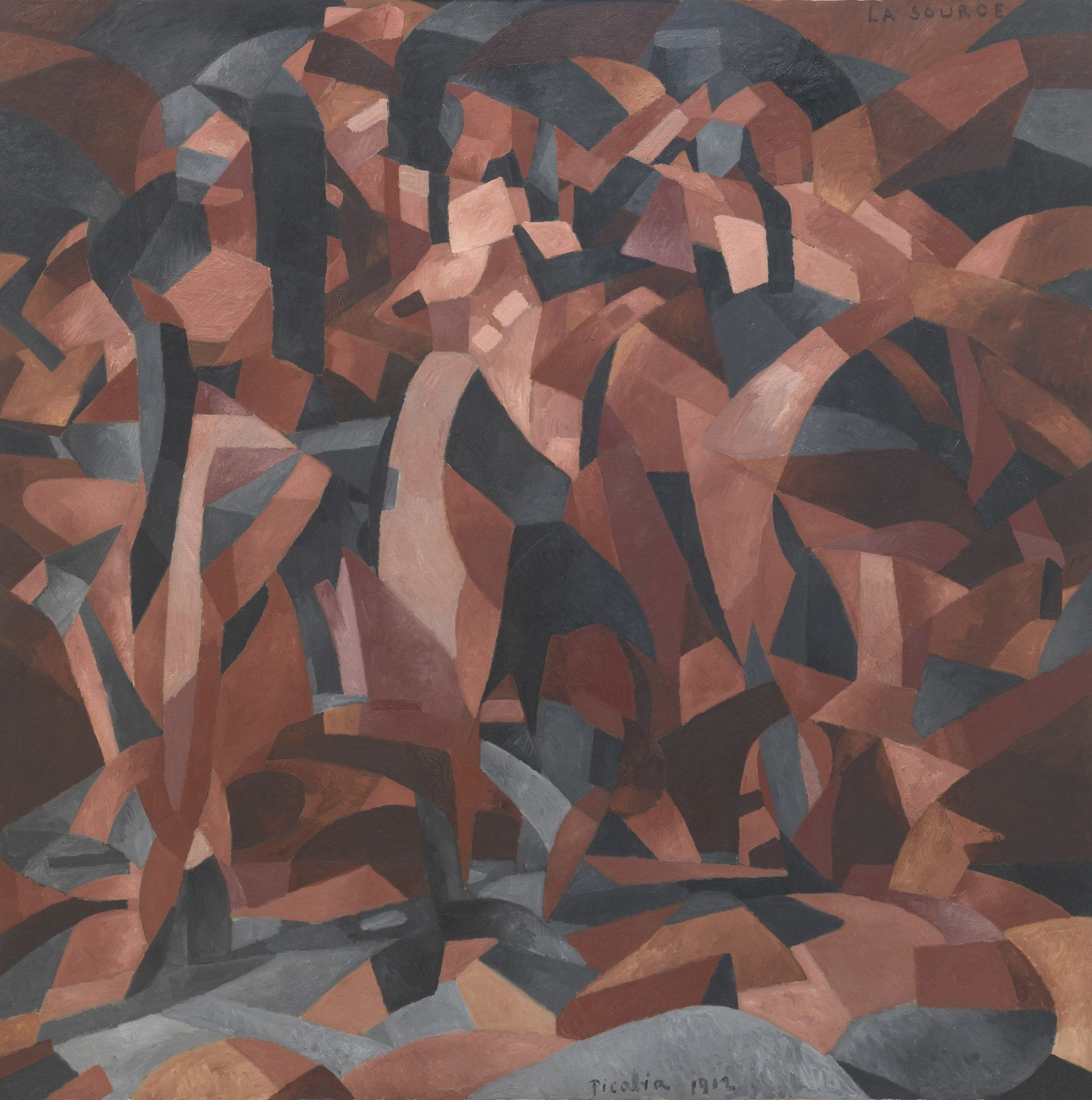
Francis Picabia, 1912, La Source (The Spring), oil on canvas, 249.6 × 249.3 cm, Museum of Modern Art, New York. Exhibited at the 1912 Salon d'Automne, Paris

Francis Picabia was born in Paris of a French mother and a Cuban father of Spanish descent. Some sources would have his father as of aristocratic Spanish descent, whereas others consider him of non-aristocratic Spanish descent, from the region of Galicia. His birth year of 1879 coincided with the Spanish-Cuban Little War; and though Picabia was born in Paris, his father was involved in Cuban-French relations and would later serve as attaché at the Cuban legation in Paris (see the Treaty of 1898). The family ties to Cuba would be important in Picabia's life later on.

The family was affluent, and both parents encouraged Picabia to pursue an art career. Picabia's mother died of tuberculosis when he was five, and he was raised by his father.

Picabia's artistic ability was apparent from his youth. In 1894, he copied a collection of Spanish paintings that belonged to his grandfather, switching the copies for the originals and selling the originals to finance his stamp collection. A lifelong philanderer, Picabia eloped to Switzerland in 1897 with one of his mistresses, causing his father to briefly cut off contact with him.

== Art career ==
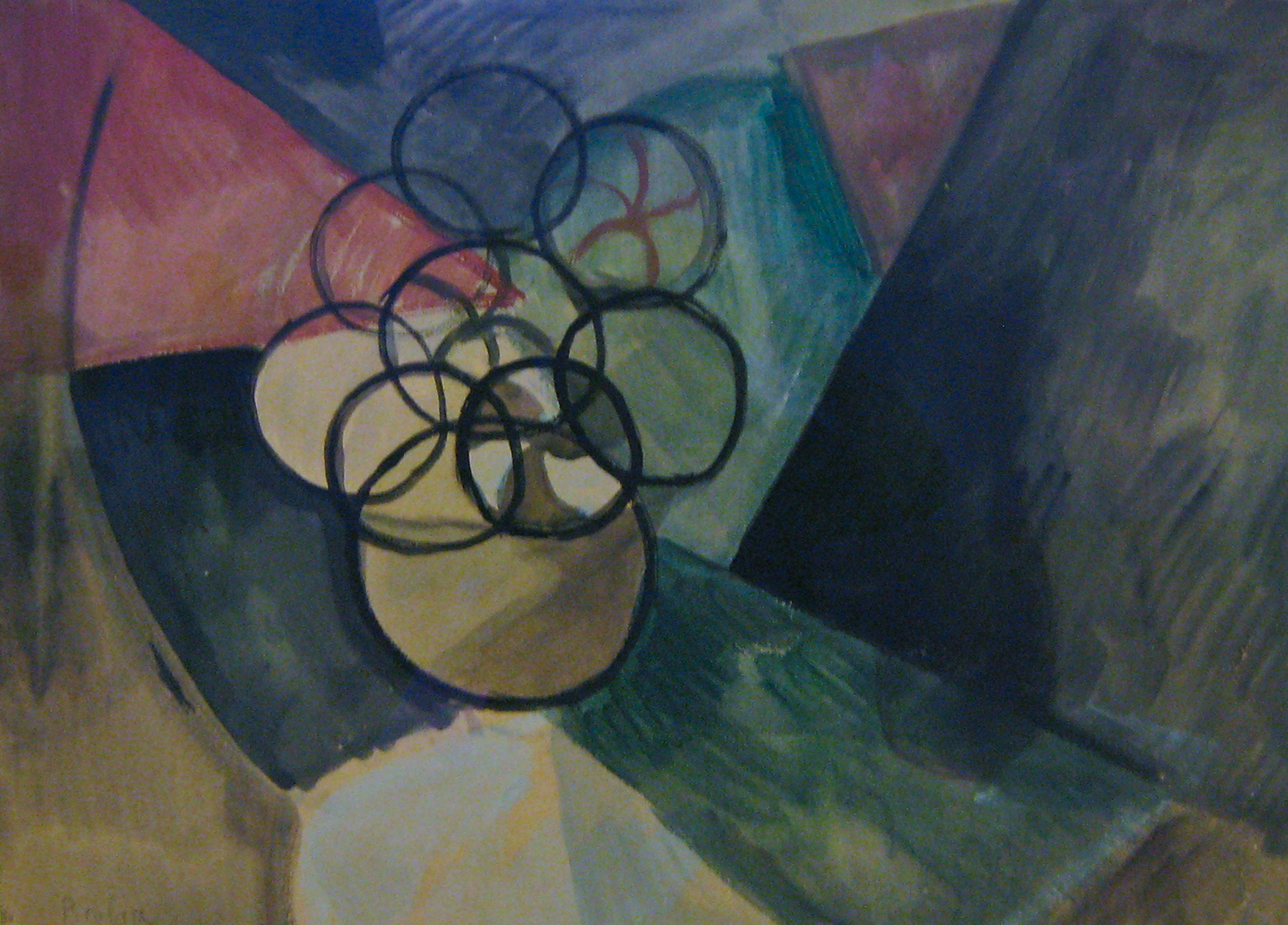
Francis Picabia, c. 1909, Caoutchouc, Centre Pompidou, Musée National d'Art Moderne

During the late 1890s, Picabia began to study art under Fernand Cormon and others at École des Arts Decoratifs, Cormon's academy at 104 boulevard de Clichy, where Van Gogh and Toulouse-Lautrec had also studied. He studied under Fernand Cormon, Ferdinand Humbert, and Albert Charles Wallet for two years. From the age of twenty, Picabia lived by painting. Subsequently, he inherited money from his mother, leaving him far wealthier than most of his contemporaries in the art world. He began buying at least one new sports car each year, and ultimately owned 127 over the course of his life.

Early in his career, from 1903 to 1908, Picabia was influenced by the Impressionist paintings of Alfred Sisley. His subject matter included small churches, lanes, roofs of Paris, riverbanks, wash houses, and barges. This led critics to question his originality, saying that he copied Sisley, that his cathedrals looked like Monet cathedrals, or that he painted like Signac. He soon came to feel he was working in an outdated style and began to look for a new approach.

From 1909, his style changed as he came under the influence of a group of artists soon to be called Cubists. These artists would later form the Golden Section (Section d'Or). The same year, Picabia married Gabrielle Buffet. (They would divorce in 1930.)

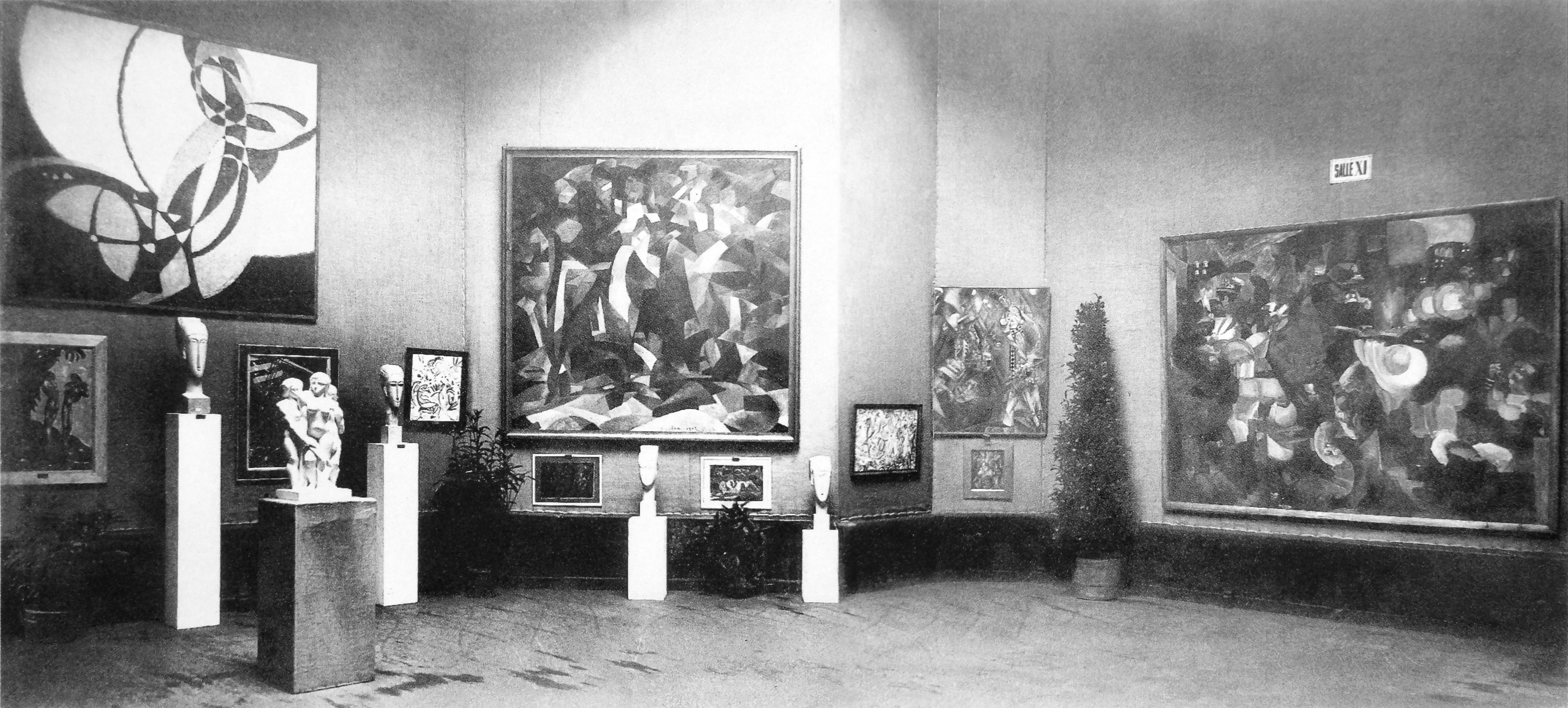
Salon d'Automne, Grand Palais des Champs-Élysées, Paris, Salle XI, between 1 October and 8 November 1912. Joseph Csaky (Groupe de femmes, sculpture front the left); Amedeo Modigliani (sculptures behind that of Csaky); paintings by František Kupka (Amorpha, Fugue in Two Colors); Francis Picabia (The Spring); Jean Metzinger (Dancer in a café); and Henri Le Fauconnier (Mountaineers Attacked by Bears)

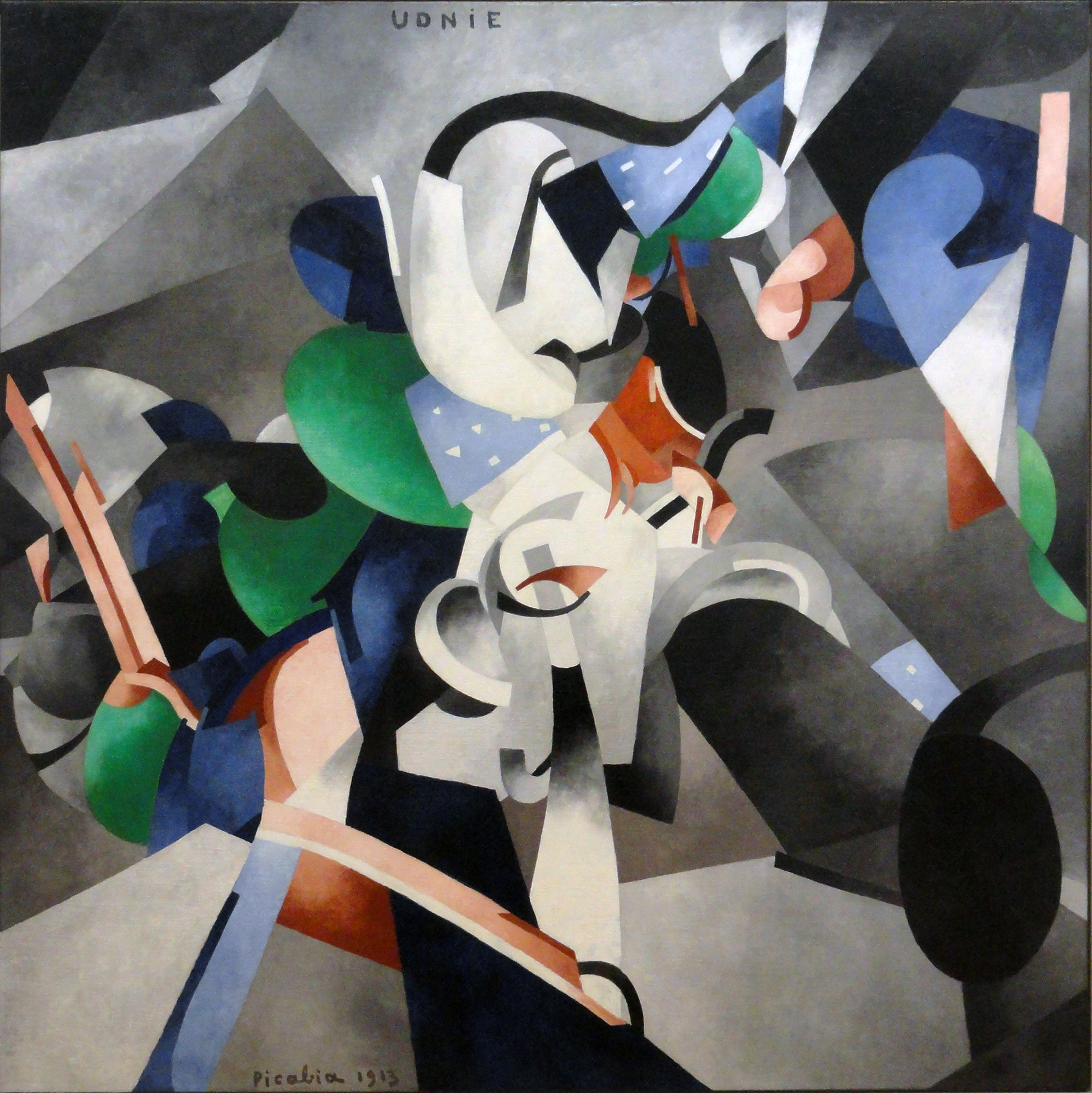
Francis Picabia, 1913, Udnie (Young American Girl, The Dance), oil on canvas, 290 × 300 cm, Musée National d'Art Moderne, Centre Georges Pompidou, Paris

Around 1911 Picabia joined the Puteaux Group, whose members he had met at the studio of Jacques Villon in Puteaux, a commune in the western suburbs of Paris. There he became friends with artist Marcel Duchamp and close friends with Guillaume Apollinaire. Other group members included Albert Gleizes, Roger de La Fresnaye, Fernand Léger and Jean Metzinger.

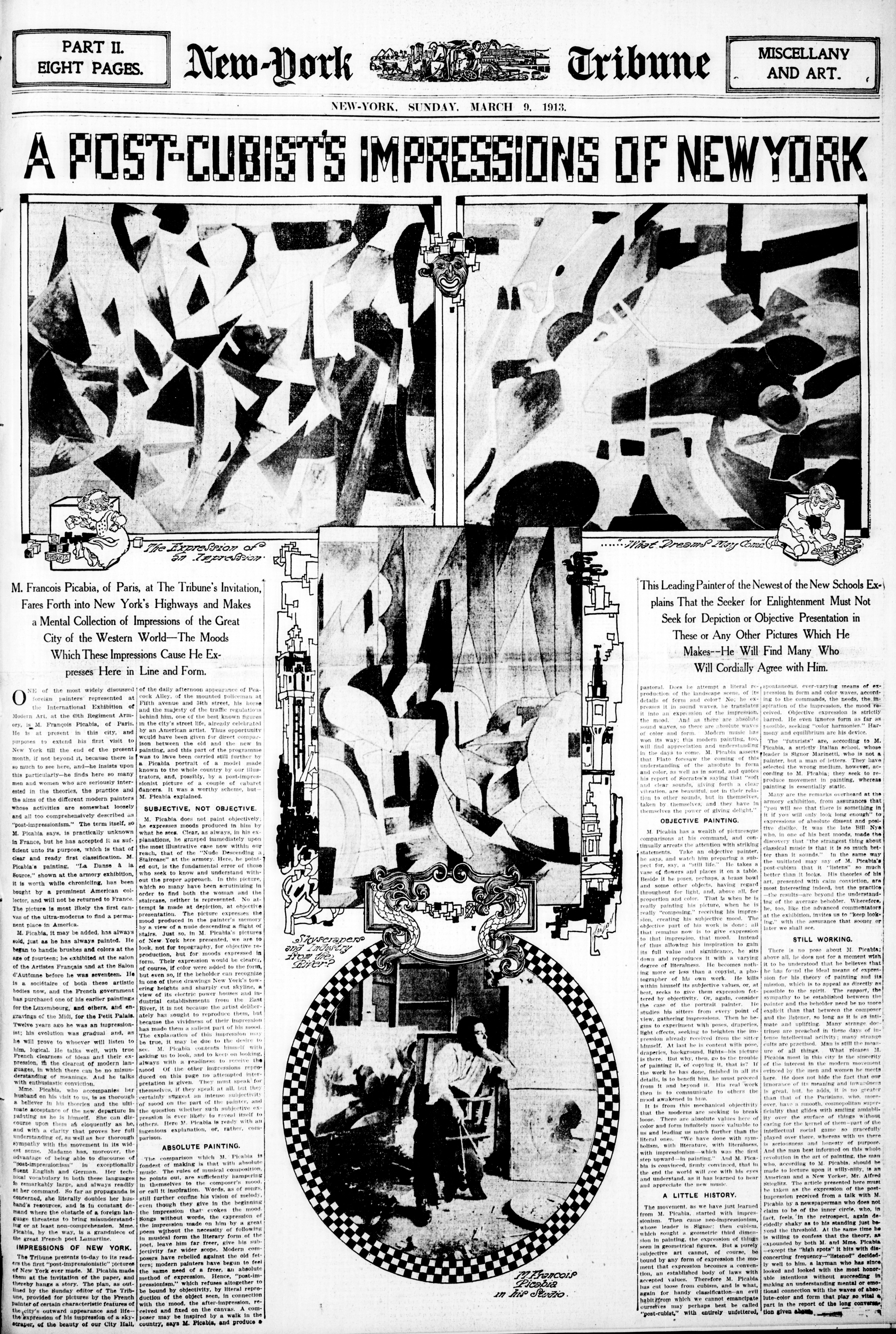
Picabia paintings published in the New York Tribune, 9 March 1913

=== Proto-Dada ===
In 1913, the Association of American Painters and Sculptors held the first major show of modernist art in New York City, which would become known as the Armory Show. The wealthy Picabia was the only member of the Cubist group to personally attend the Armory Show, as the others could not afford to do so, and he also contributed four paintings. The American press was largely hostile to the show, describing it as bizarre or deviant, but Picabia was widely interviewed and discussed as the only representative of the movement available. He immediately became a major name in New York's artistic circles.

Avant-garde art dealer Alfred Stieglitz also gave Picabia a solo show, Exhibition of New York studies by Francis Picabia, at his gallery 291 (formerly Little Galleries of the Photo-Secession), 17 March – 5 April 1913. There, Picabia displayed work that he had created in the past few months in New York. Influenced by abstract art from the Armory Show such as that of Wassily Kandinsky, he was now creating abstract works of his own. When he returned to Paris in April 1913, he formally broke with the Cubists.

From 1913 to 1915 Picabia traveled to New York City several times. During that same era, France became embroiled in war. In 1915, Picabia again traveled to the United States en route to Cuba to buy molasses for a friend of his—the director of a sugar refinery. He landed in New York in June 1915. Though the stopover was ostensibly meant to be a simple port of call, he decided to remain there for a while to continue working on his art. He did not return to France until the war's conclusion.

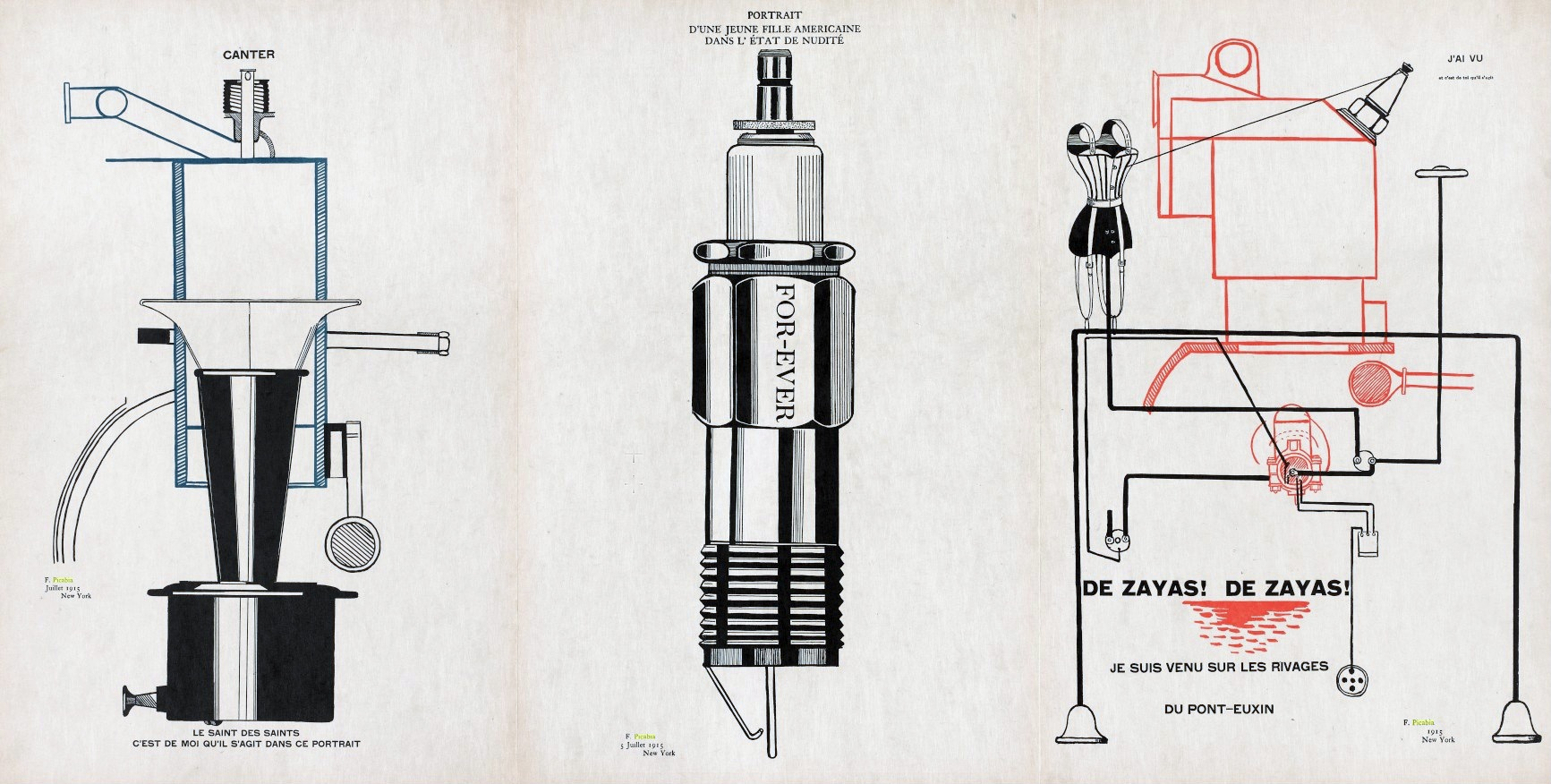
(Left) Le saint des saints c'est de moi qu'il s'agit dans ce portrait, 1 July 1915; (center) Portrait d'une jeune fille américaine dans l'état de nudité, 5 July 1915: (right) J'ai vu et c'est de toi qu'il s'agit, De Zayas! De Zayas! Je suis venu sur les rivages du Pont-Euxin, New York, 1915

The following years can be characterized as Picabia's proto-Dada or "machinist" period, consisting mainly of his portraits mécaniques. Picabia was first impressed by mechanical advances on his initial, 1913 visit to New York, and on returning to Europe, he was impressed by futurist painters such as Natalia Goncharova and Mikhail Larionov. Picabia was particularly influenced by the "machine style" of Marcel Duchamp, in which the artist used materials such as metal and glass as well as mechanical drawing implements. In 1915, Picabia began to create and exhibit his own drawings and prints of mysterious machines and apparatuses to reflect the coming of the Machine Age. He continued in this style for almost a decade, exhibiting a large solo show of his machinist work in 1922. In 1923, he abruptly discontinued his work in the style, as he had with several previous styles.

In this period, the magazine 291 devoted an entire issue to him, he met Man Ray, Gabrielle and Duchamp joined him, drugs and alcohol became a problem and his health declined. He suffered from dropsy and tachycardia.

=== Manifesto ===
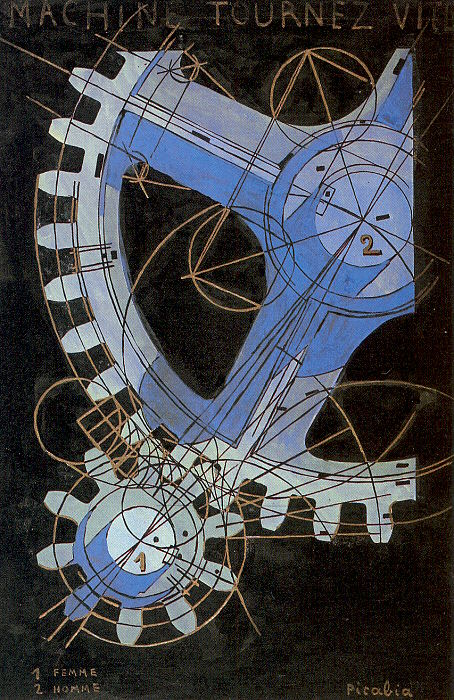
Machine Turn Quickly, 1916–1918, tempera on paper, National Gallery of Art

Later, in 1916, while in Barcelona and within a small circle of refugee artists that included Albert Gleizes and his wife Juliette Roche, Marie Laurencin, Olga Sacharoff, Robert Delaunay and Sonia Delaunay, he started his Dada periodical 391 (published by Galeries Dalmau), modeled on Stieglitz's own periodical. He continued the periodical with the help of Marcel Duchamp in the United States. In Zürich, seeking treatment for depression and suicidal impulses, he had met Tristan Tzara, whose radical ideas thrilled Picabia. Back in Paris, and now with his mistress Germaine Everling, he was in the city of "les assises dada" where André Breton, Paul Éluard, Philippe Soupault and Louis Aragon met at Certa, a Basque bar in the Passage de l'Opera. Picabia, the provocateur, was back home.

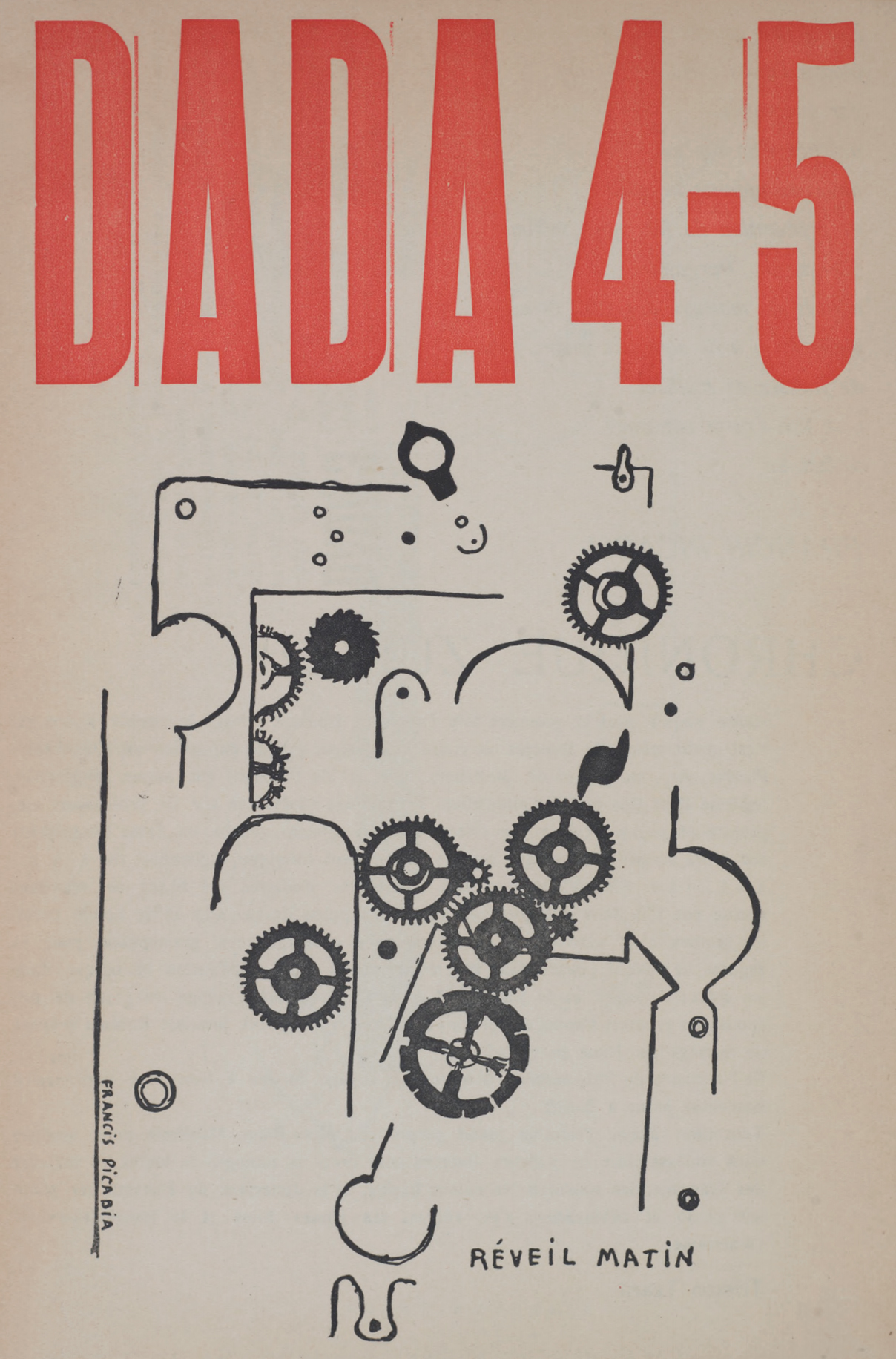
Francis Picabia, Réveil Matin (Alarm Clock), Dada 4–5, Number 5, 15 May 1919

Picabia continued his involvement in the Dada movement through 1919 in Zürich and Paris, before breaking away from it after developing an interest in Surrealist art. (See Cannibale, 1921.) He denounced Dada in 1921, and issued a personal attack against Breton in the final issue of 391, in 1924. The same year, he appeared briefly in the René Clair short film Entr'acte, which would become one of the most famous surrealist films of the decade.

=== Later years ===
Reflecting on his break with Dada, Picabia wrote, "If you want to have clean ideas, change them like shirts." His career would later be remembered in part for his wide range of artistic styles. In 1922, André Breton relaunched Littérature magazine with cover images by Picabia, to whom he gave carte blanche for each issue. Picabia drew on religious imagery, erotic iconography, and the iconography of games of chance.

In 1925, Picabia returned to figurative painting, producing a series of dense, garish paintings known as his "Monster" period. These would later be an important influence on German painter Sigmar Polke. From 1927 to 1930, Picabia produced his "Transparencies" series, paintings that combined images from High Renaissance art with figures from contemporary popular culture.

During the 1930s became a close friend of and received encouragement from the modernist novelist Gertrude Stein, painting a portrait of her in 1933. In 1940, he married Olga Mohler on 14 June, the same day that the Nazis seized Paris. Shortly after, he moved to Southern France, where his work took a surprising turn: he produced a series of paintings based on the nude glamour photos in French "girlie" magazines like Paris Sex-Appeal, in a garish style which appears to subvert traditional, academic nude painting. Some of these went to an Algerian merchant who sold them, and so it passed that Picabia came to decorate brothels across North Africa under the Occupation.

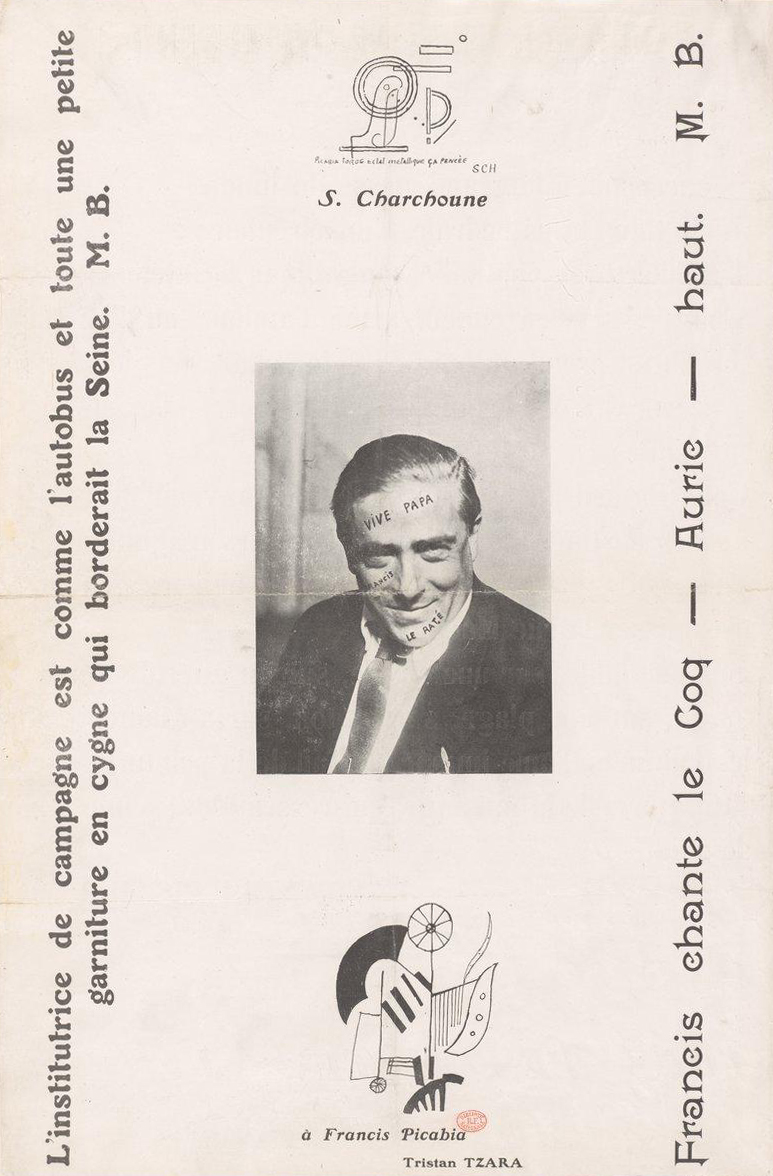
Francis Picabia, Francis chante le Coq, 391, n. 14, Nov. 1920

Before the end of World War II, he returned to Paris, where he resumed abstract painting and writing poetry. A large retrospective of his work was held at the Galerie René Drouin in Paris in the spring of 1949. Picabia died in Paris in 1953 and was interred in the Cimetière de Montmartre.

== Personal life ==
Picabia was married in 1909 to Gabrièle Buffet-Picabia, a French art critic and writer affiliated with Dadaism and later an organizer of the French Resistance. They had four children. They divorced in 1930. Their tumultuous union is re-imagined by great-granddaughter Anne Berest in The Postcard, a semi-autobiographical French novel published in 2021.

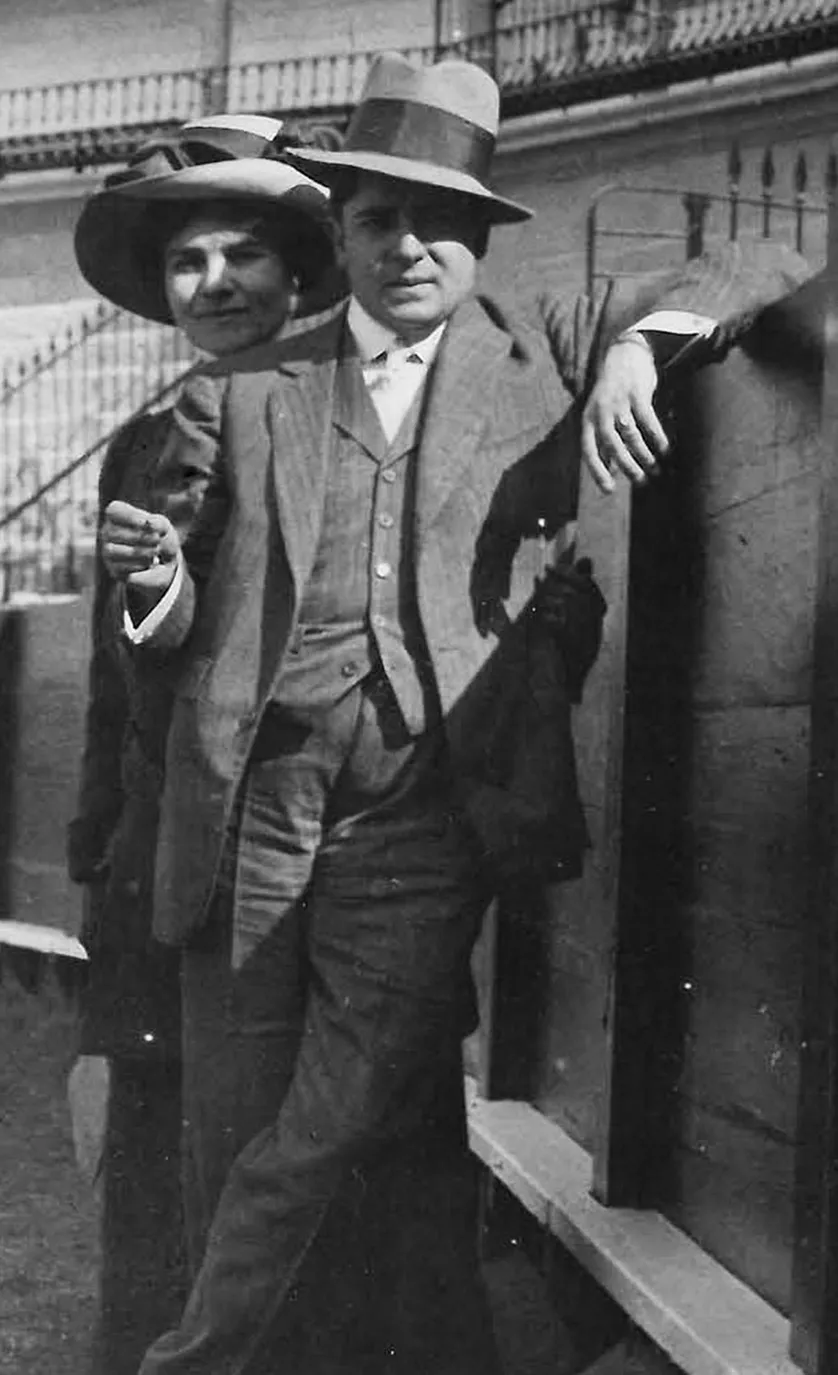
Francis and Gabriele in Seville in 1909

After the success of The Postcard, in 2025, Europa Press published the novel Gabriele. The novel was written by Anne Berest and sister Claire Berest. The book goes into detail about Gabriele’s life from historical documents, family records and interviews and how Francis and Gabriele met and the two developed a relationship that "changed art history."

In the book, the Berest sisters talk about the emergence of Dadaism and the friends and acquaintances Francis and Gabriele made along the way. Artists like Marcel Duchamp, Guillaume Apollinaire, Gertrude Stein, Isadora Duncan amongst others. In the novel, the sisters talk about Gabriële and Francis having an active love triangle going for years with Duchamp during the Picabias’ marriage. “Gabriële” is billed as a novel but the sisters write in a forward the events “really did happen to its main characters, though we’ve told them our own way.”

== Legacy ==
Public collections holding works by Picabia include the Museum of Modern Art and Solomon R. Guggenheim Museum in New York; the Philadelphia Museum of Art; the Art Institute of Chicago; the Tate Gallery, London and the Musée National d'Art Moderne, Paris.

In the mid-1980s two of Picabia's Dada writings, Who Knows and Yes No were published in English by Hanuman Books and in 2007 MIT Press published a large book of his poetry and other writings in English called I Am a Beautiful Monster: Poetry, Prose, and Provocation that was translated by Marc Lowenthal.

A major retrospective of Picabia's work in the United States was held in 2016 at Kunsthaus Zürich and then from 2016 to 2017 at the Museum of Modern Art, New York. The retrospective was widely discussed by international art critics such as Philippe Dagen from Le Monde.

From October 9, 2026 – January 24, 2027, the Palazzo Reale Milano exhibited Picabia. Open the Gates of Night (Picabia. Aprire le porte della notte). It is the largest exhibition of Picabia’s work in Italy and includes his work in a variety of mediums; it was curated by his great-granddaughter Anne Berest Picabia.

Among the artists influenced by Picabia's work are the American artists David Salle and Julian Schnabel, the German artist Sigmar Polke, and the Italian artist Francesco Clemente. In 1996, French artist Jean-Jacques Lebel initiated and co-curated the exhibition Picabia, Dalmau 1922 (with reference to Picabia's solo exhibition at Galeries Dalmau in 1922) shown at Fundació Antoni Tàpies in Barcelona and the Musée National d'Art Moderne, Centre Pompidou. In 2002, the artists Peter Fischli & David Weiss installed Suzanne Pagé's retrospective devoted to Picabia at the musée d'art moderne de la ville de Paris (MAMVP).

In 2003, a Picabia painting once owned by André Breton sold for US$1.6 million. Picabia's Volucelle II (c. 1922) sold for US$8,789,000 at Sotheby's in 2013, then the highest price for one of the artist's works. A new record was set in 2022 with the sale of Pavonia at Sotheby's for US$11 million.

== Gallery ==
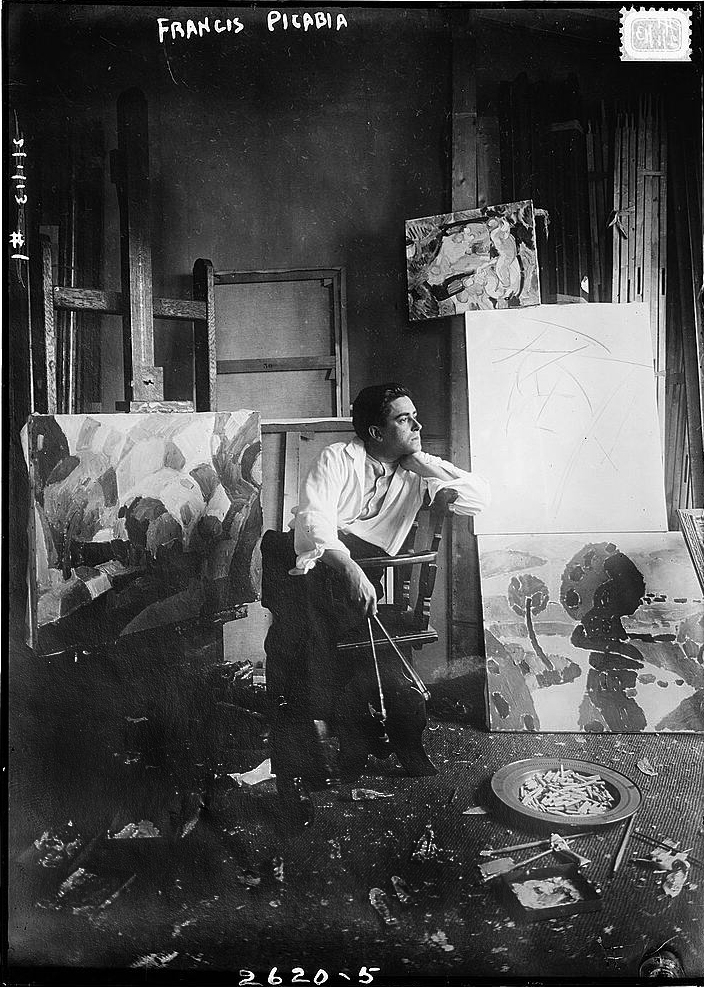
Francis Picabia in his studio c. 1912

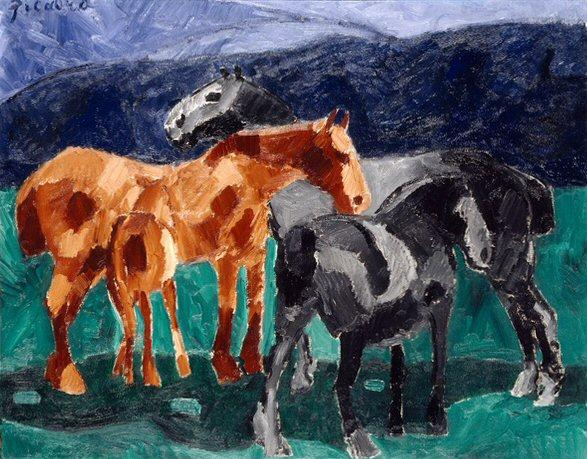
Horses, 1911, oil on canvas, 73.3 x 92.5 cm, Musée National d'Art Moderne, Centre Georges Pompidou, Paris. Published in the New York Times, New York, 16 February 1913, Page 121

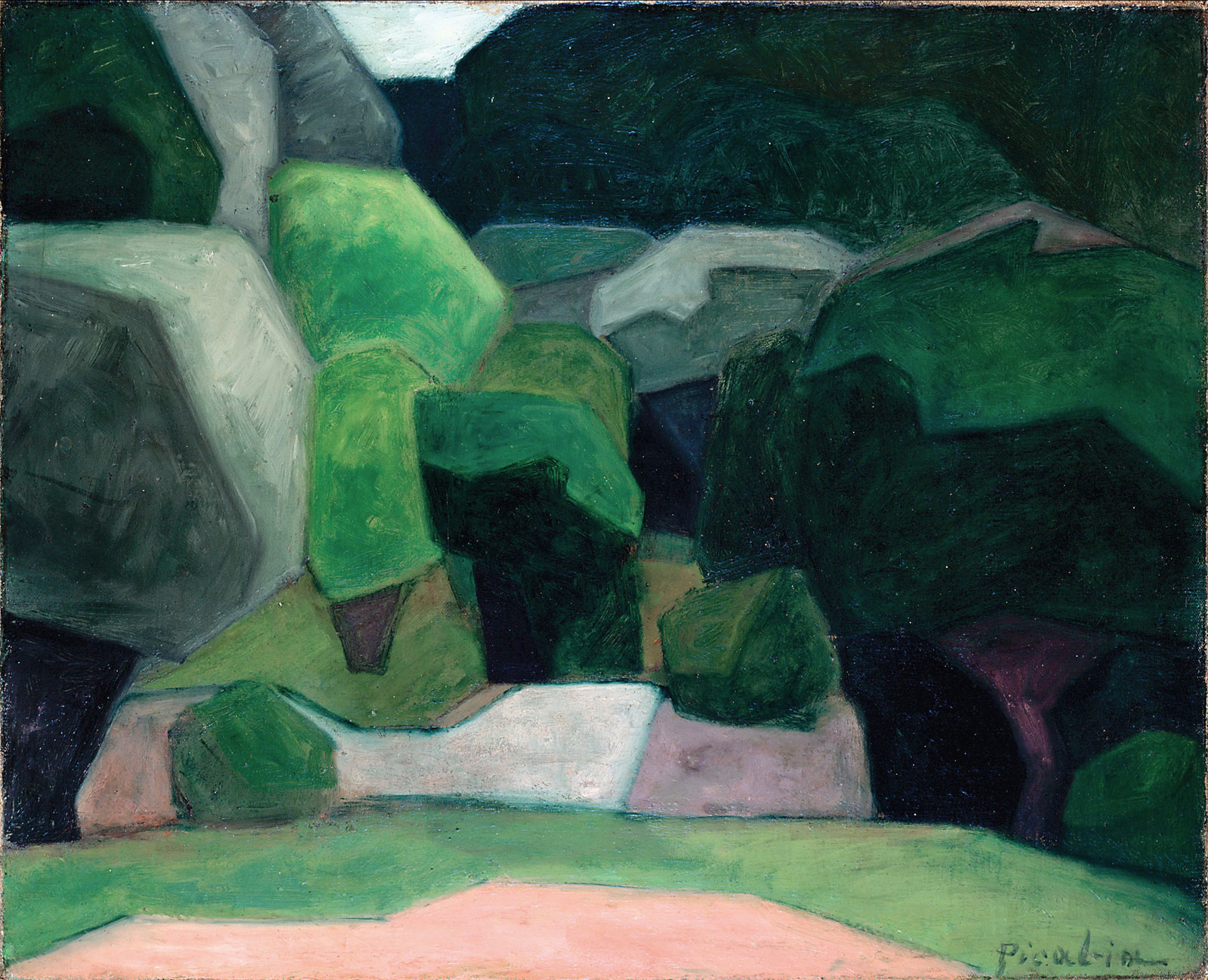
Paysage à Cassis (Landscape at Cassis), 1911–12, oil on canvas, 50.3 × 61.5 cm, private collection

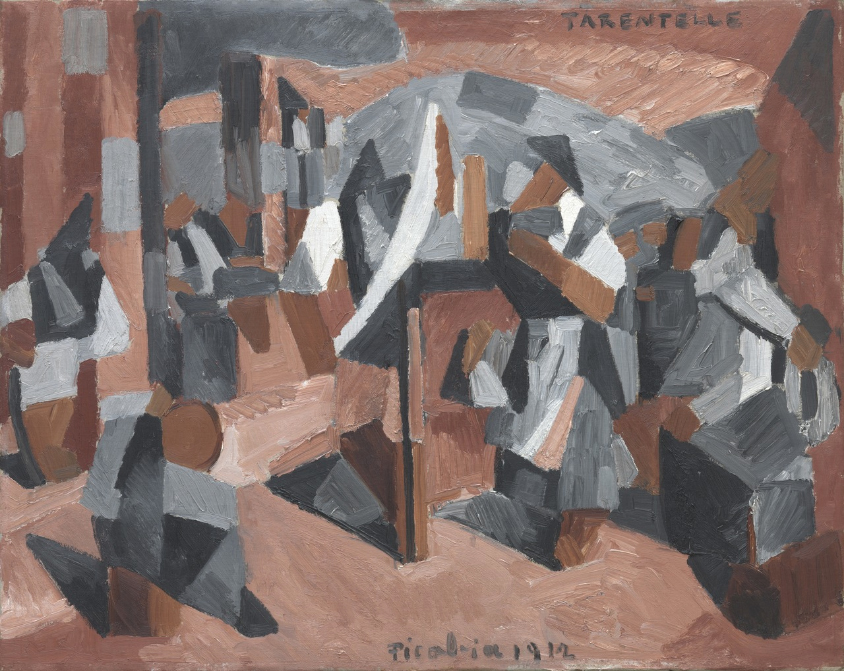
Tarentelle, 1912, oil on canvas, 73.6 x 92.1 cm, Museum of Modern Art, New York. Reproduced in Du "Cubisme" by Albert Gleizes and Jean Metzinger, published in 1912

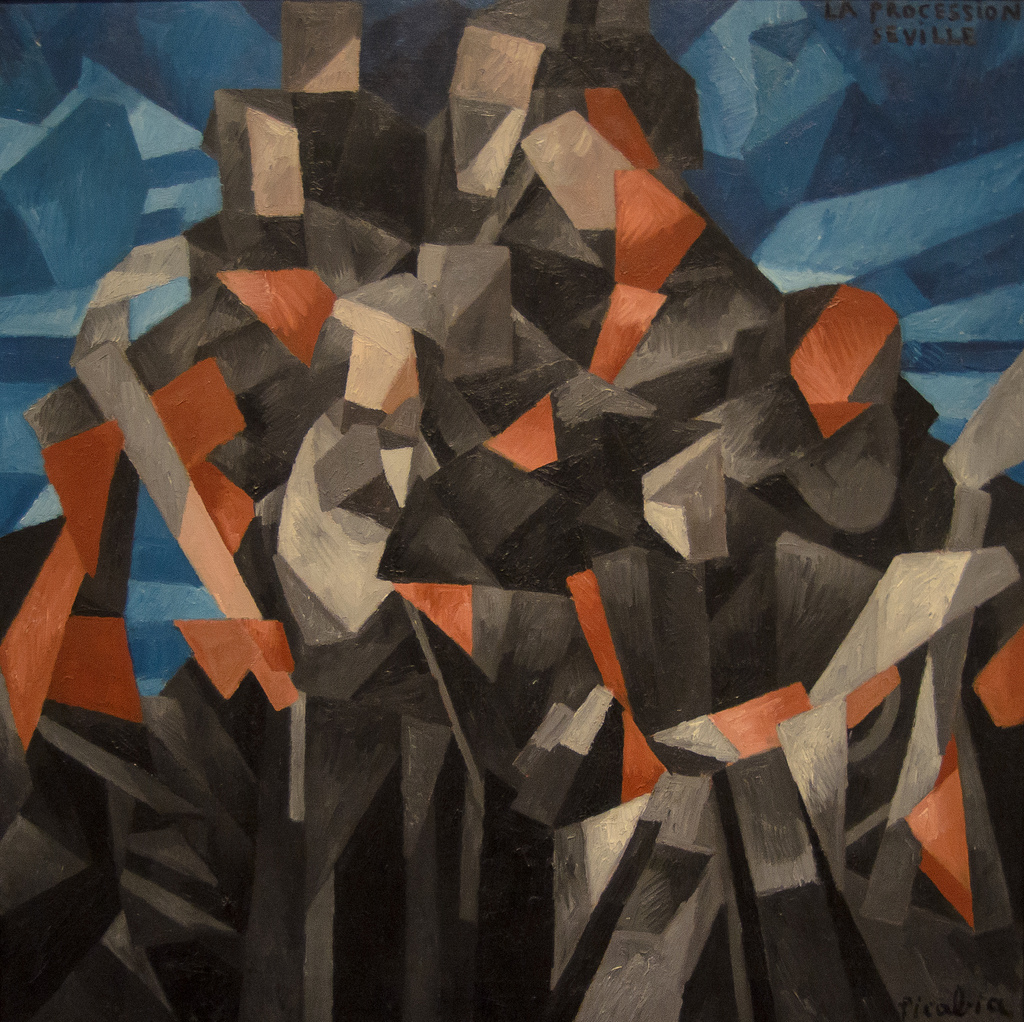
The Procession, Seville, 1912, oil on canvas, 121.9 x 121.9 cm, National Gallery of Art, Washington DC.

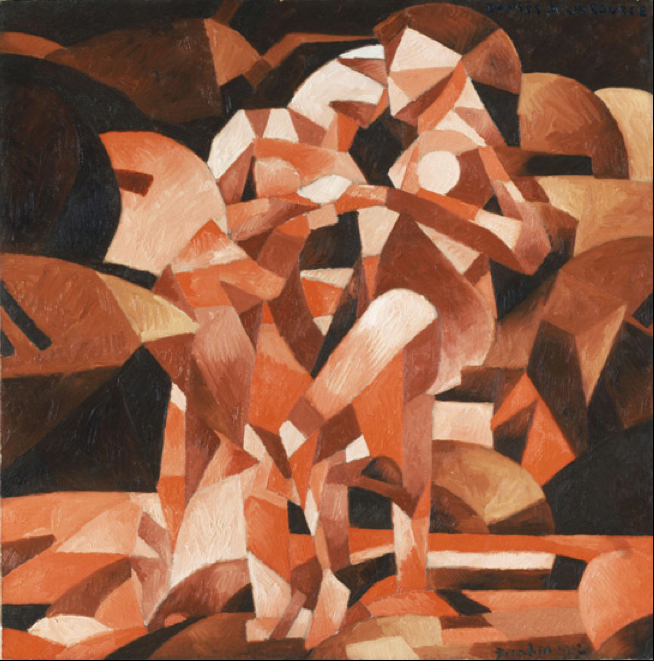
The Dance at the Spring, 1912, oil on canvas, 120.5 x 120.6 cm, Philadelphia Museum of Art. Exhibited at the 1913 Armory Show

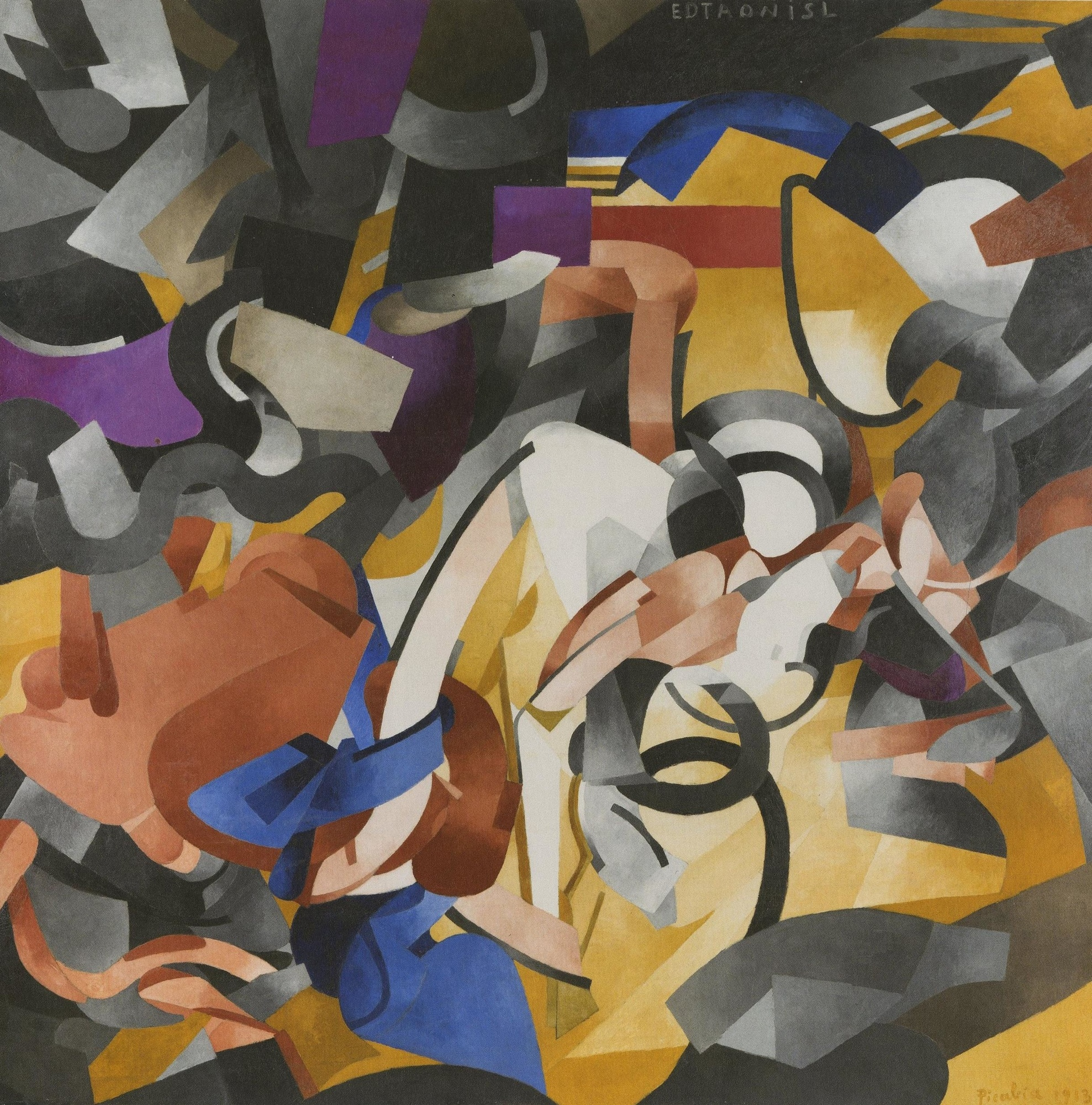
Edtaonisl (Ecclesiastic), 1913, oil on canvas, 300.4 x 300.7 cm, Art Institute of Chicago

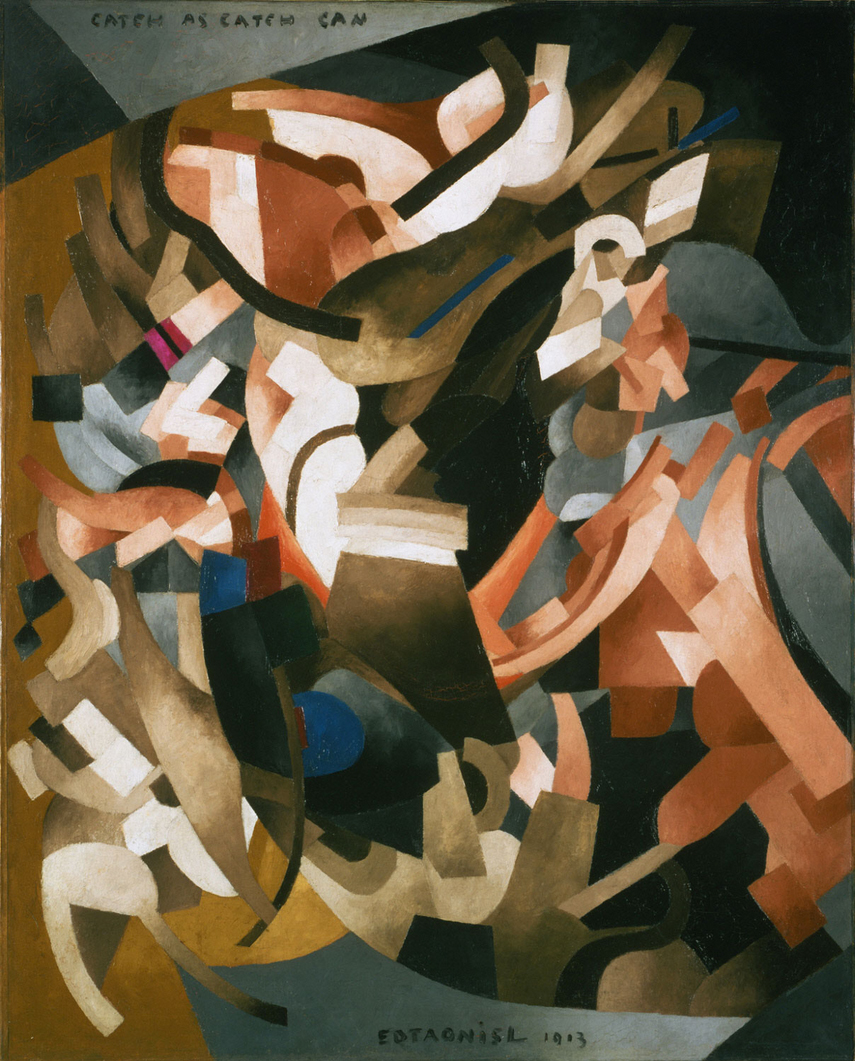
Catch as Catch Can, 1913, oil on canvas, 100.6 x 81.6 cm, Philadelphia Museum of Art

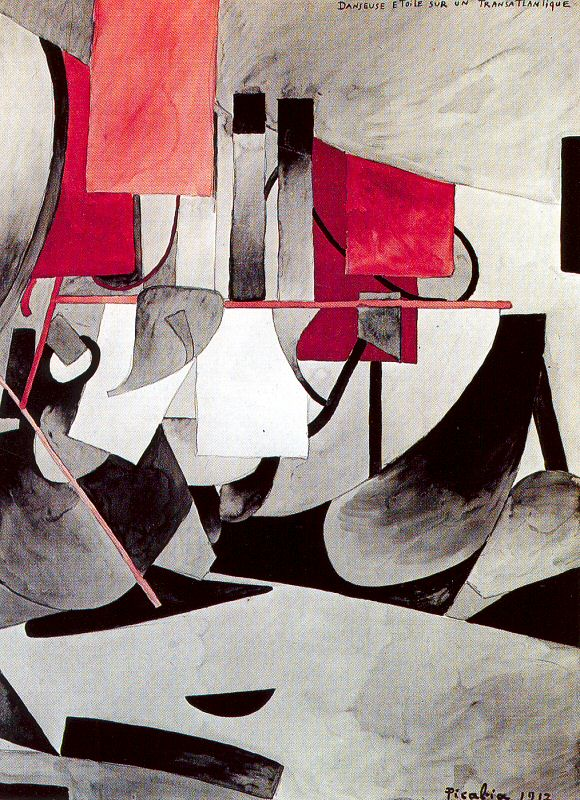
Star Dancer on a Transatlantic Steamer, 1913

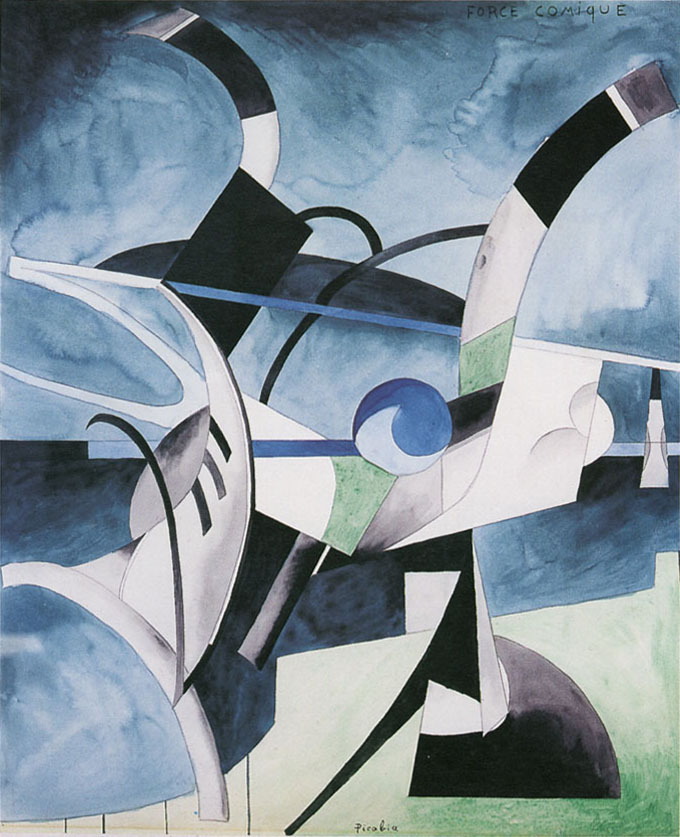
Force Comique, 1913–14, watercolor and graphite on paper, 63.4 x 52.7 cm, Berkshire Museum, Pittsfield, MA

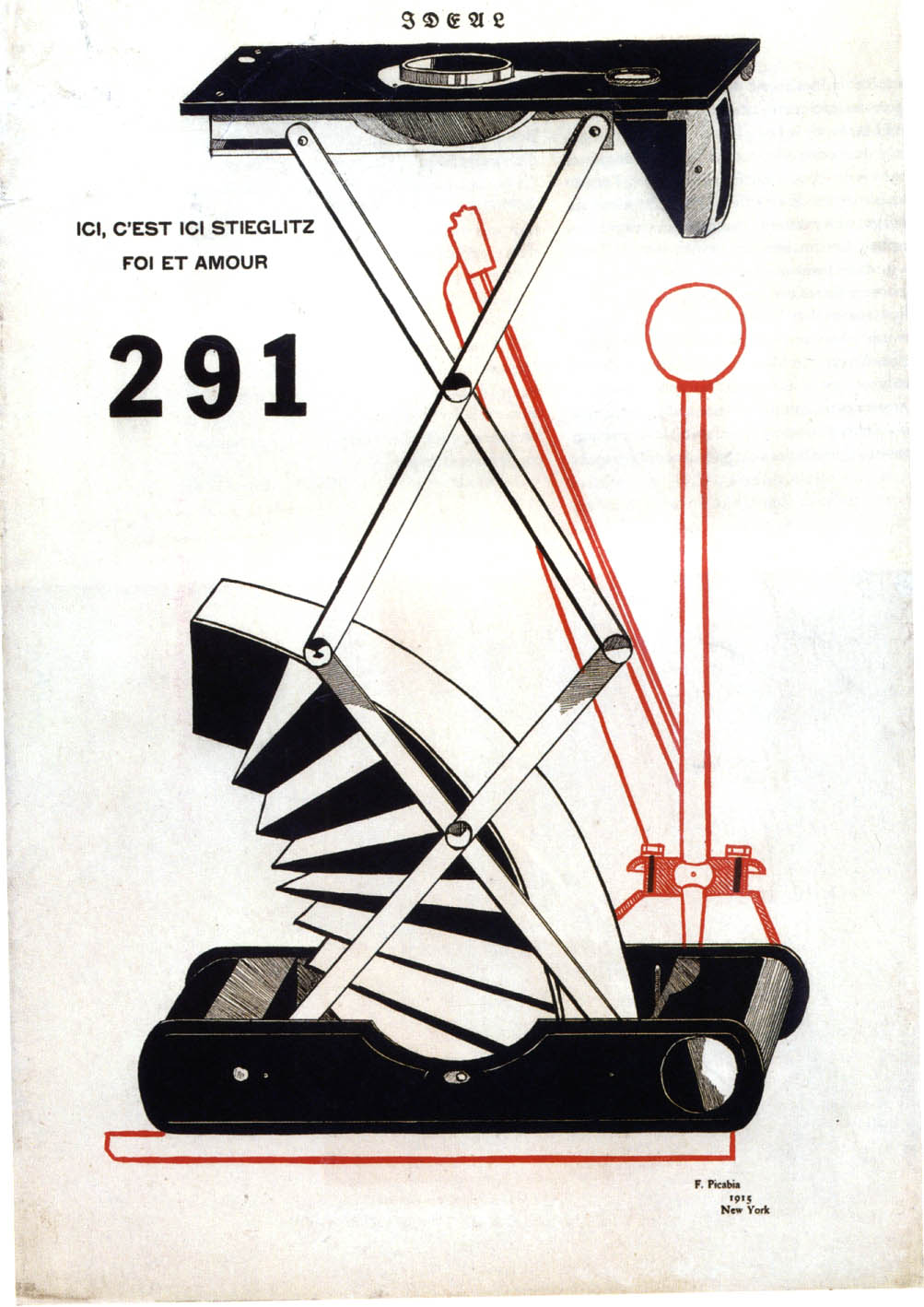
Ici, c'est ici Stieglitz, foi et amour, cover of 291, No1, 1915

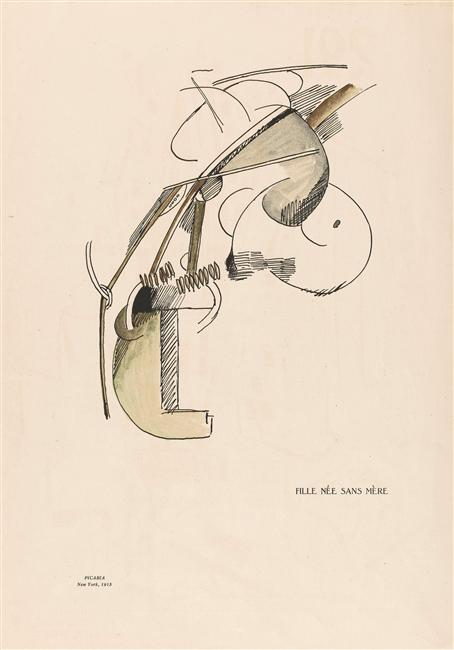
Fille née sans mère (Girl Born Without a Mother), 1915, work on paper, 47.4 x 31.7 cm, Musée d'Orsay

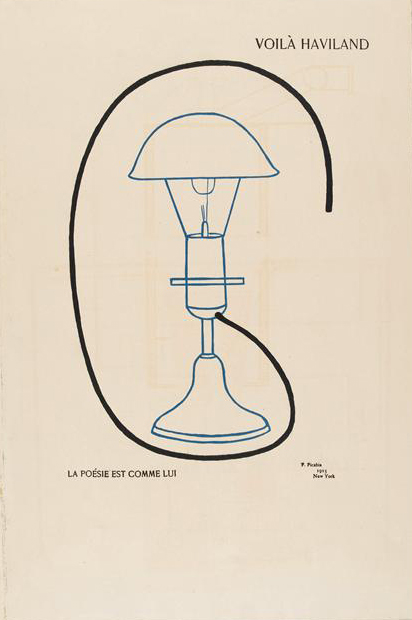
Voilà Haviland (La poésie est comme lui), Portrait mécanomorphe de Paul B. Haviland, 1915, Musée d'Orsay

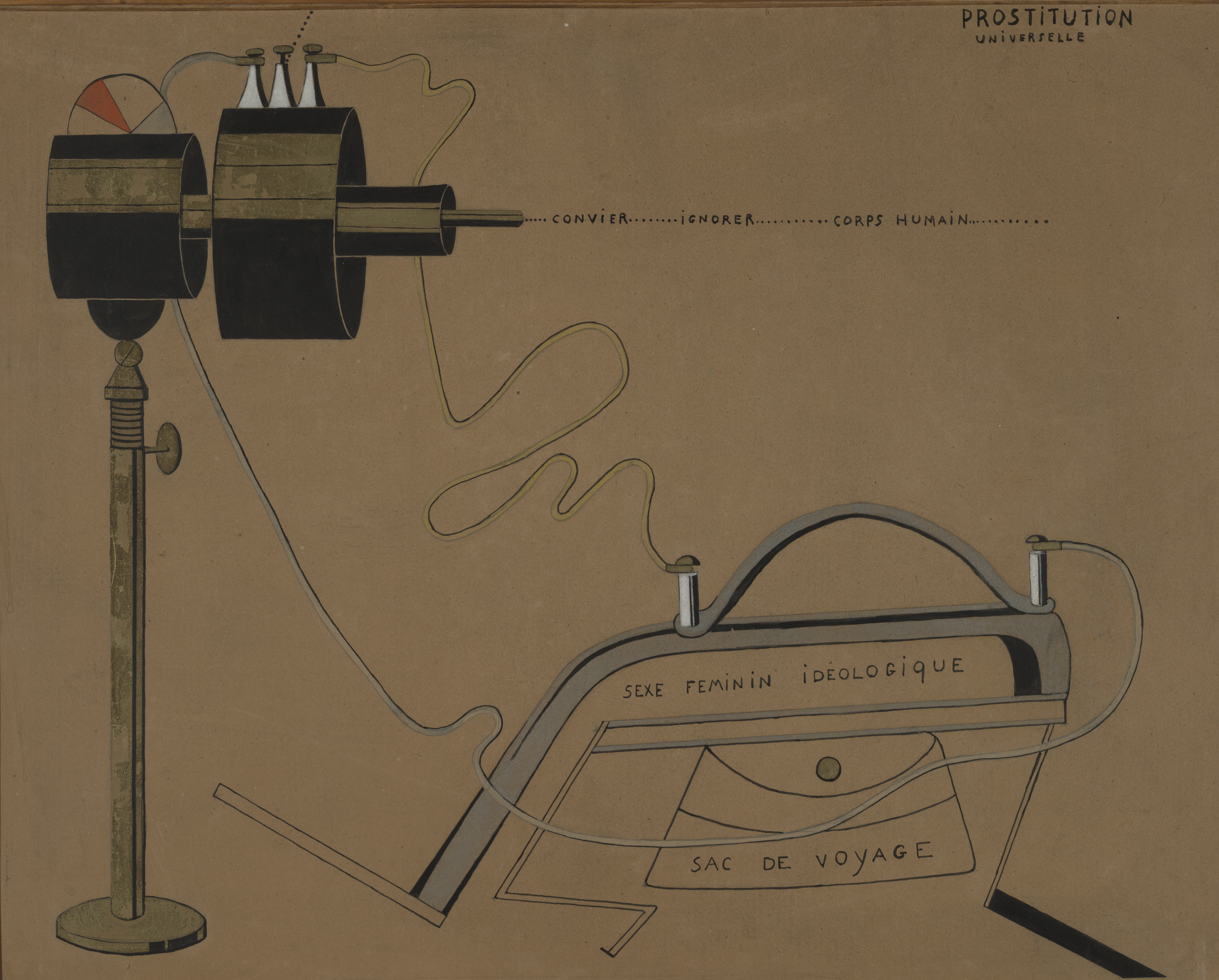
Prostitution Universelle (Universal Prostitution), 1916–17, black ink, tempera, metallic paint on cardboard, 74.5 x 94.2 cm, Yale University Art Gallery

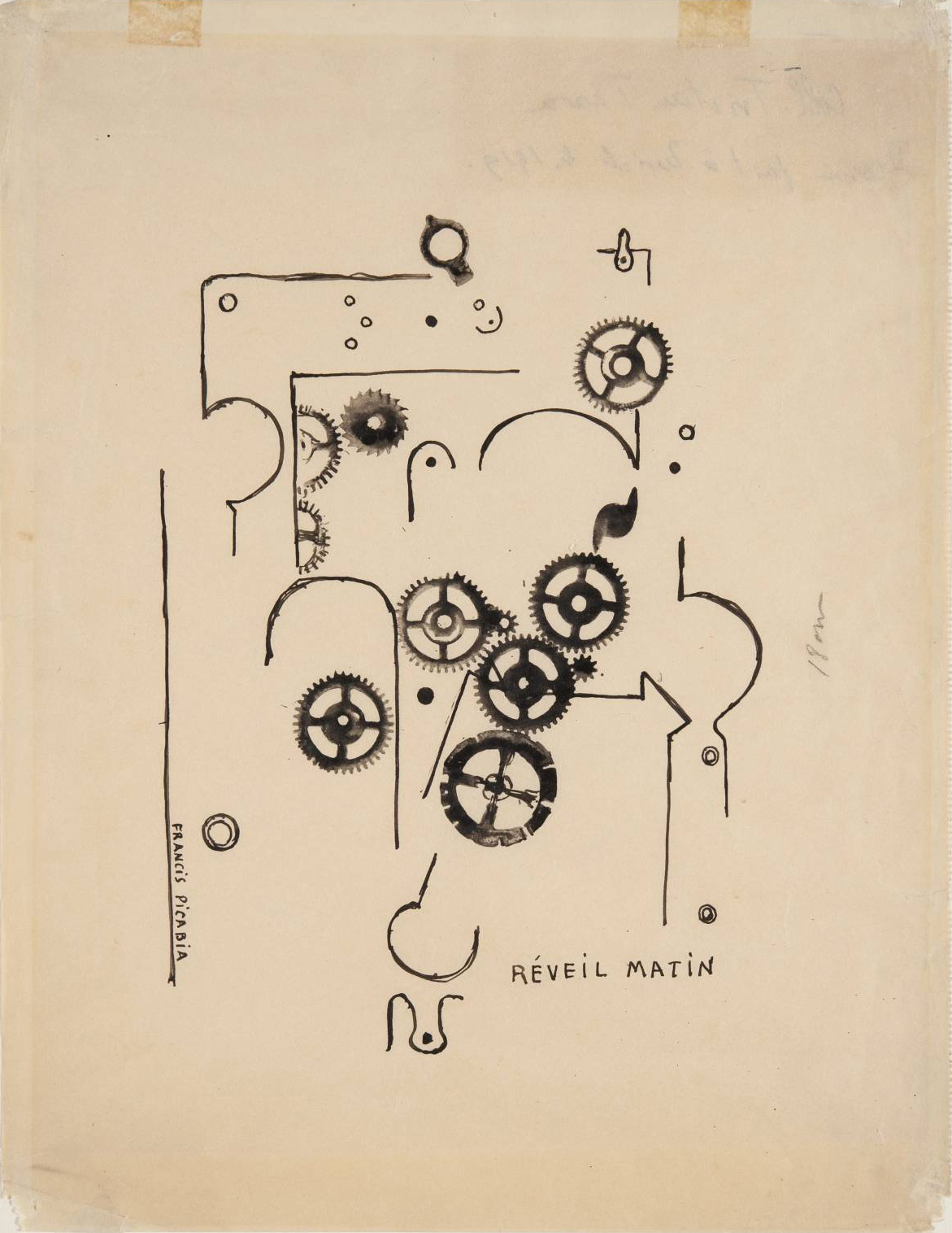
Réveil Matin (Alarm Clock), 1919, ink on paper, 31.8 x 23 cm, Tate, London

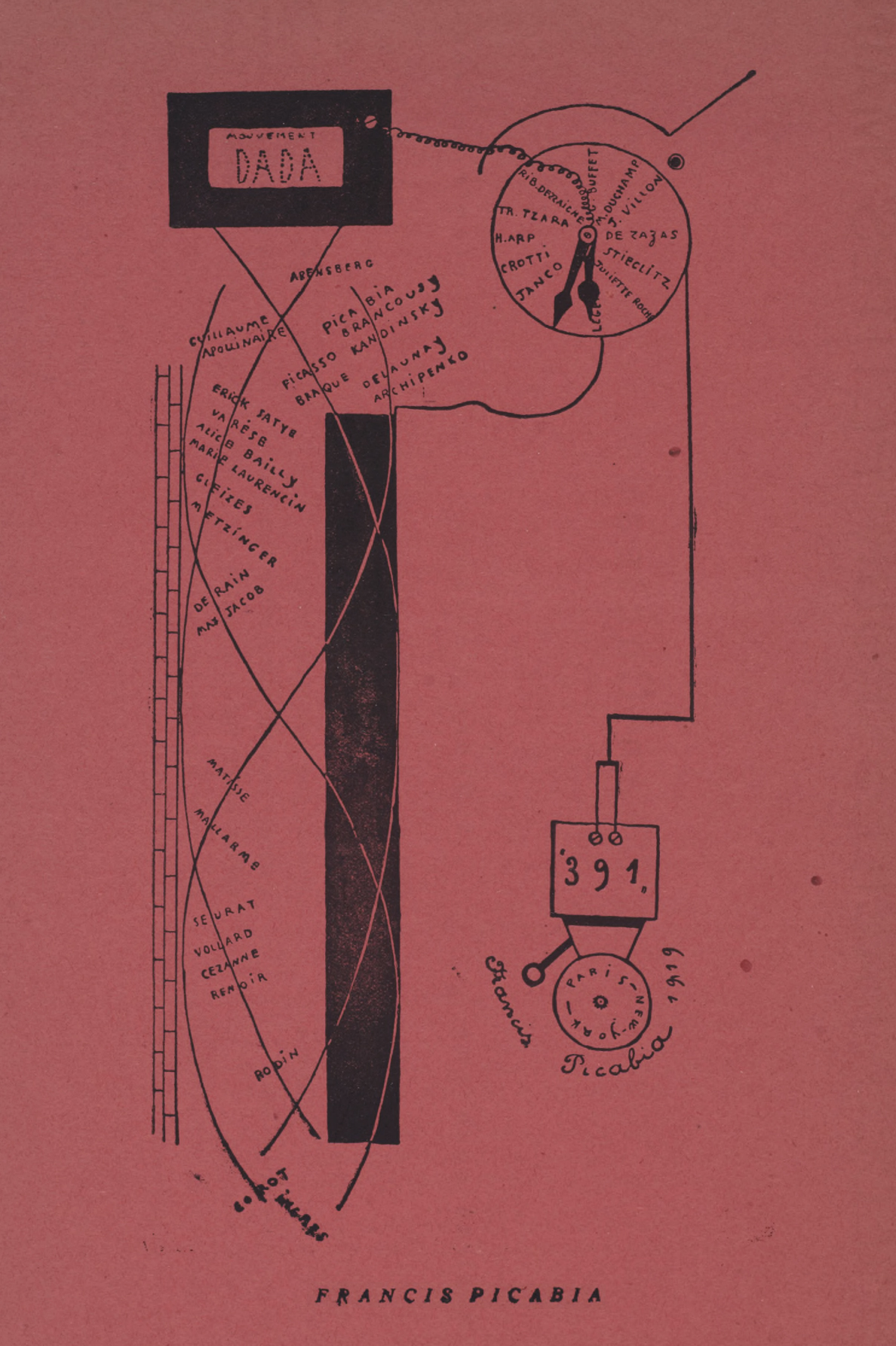
Dada Movement, Dada, Number 5, 15 May 1919

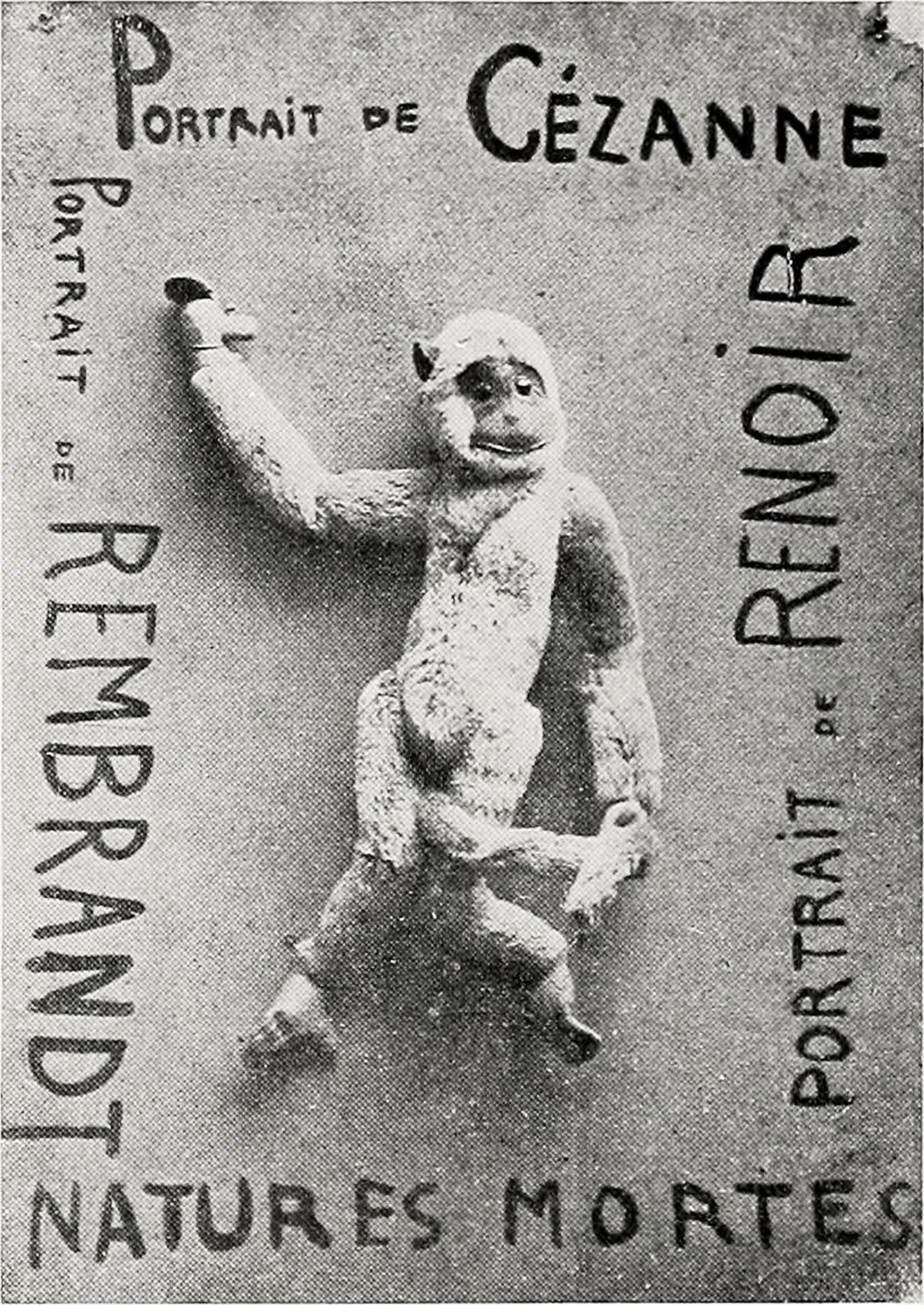
Portrait of Cézanne, Portrait of Renoir, Portrait of Rembrandt, 1920, Toy monkey and oil on cardboard, 39.4 x 55 cm, Reproduced in Cannibale, Paris, n. 1, April 25, 1920

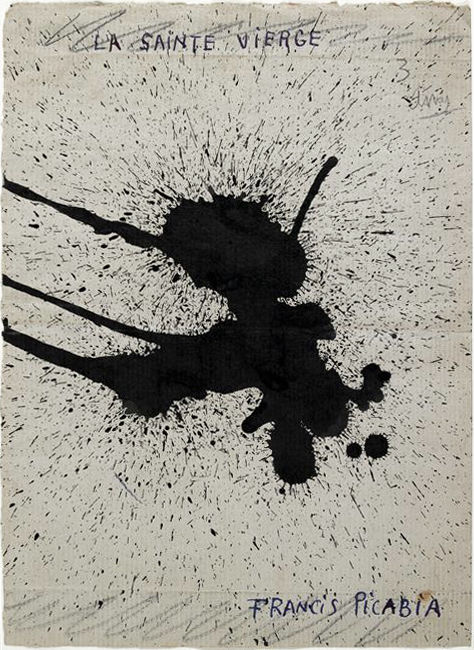
La Sainte Vierge (The Blessed Virgin), 1920, ink and graphite on paper, 33 x 24 cm, Musée National d'Art Moderne, Paris

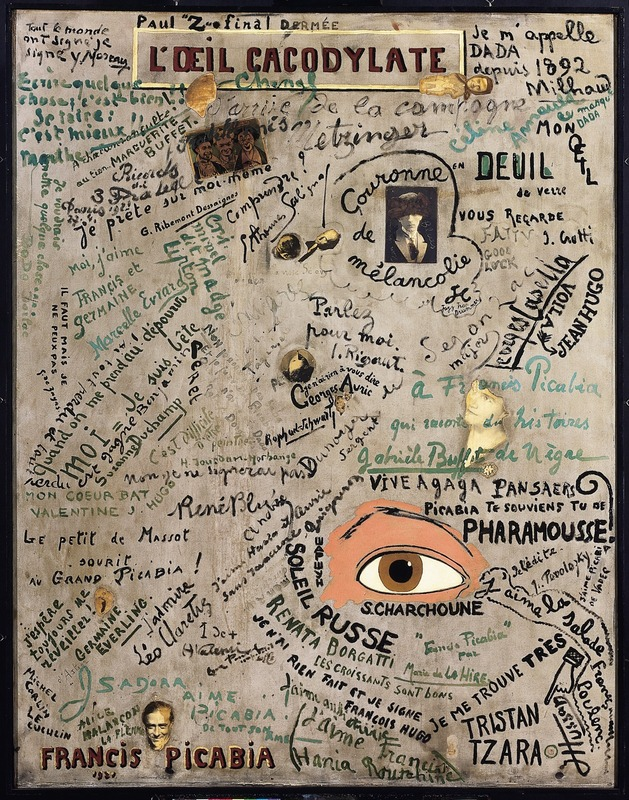
Francis Picabia, 1921, L'oeil cacodylate, oil and collage on canvas, 148.6 x 117.4 cm, Musée National d'Art Moderne, Paris

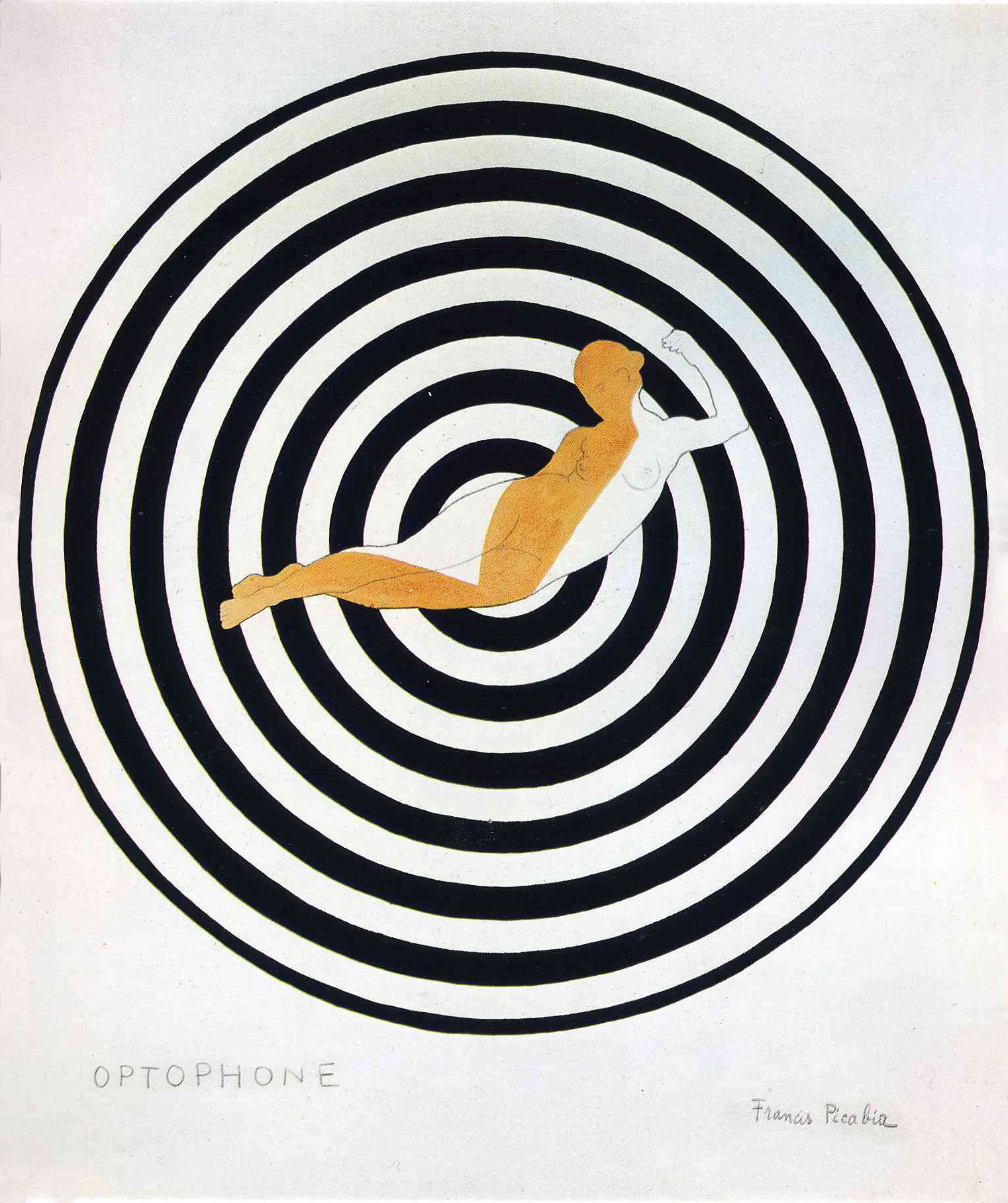
Optophone I, c. 1921–22, ink, acrylic, and graphite on paper, 72 x 60 cm. Reproduced in Galeries Dalmau, Picabia, exhibition catalogue, Barcelona, Nov. 18 - Dec. 8, 1922

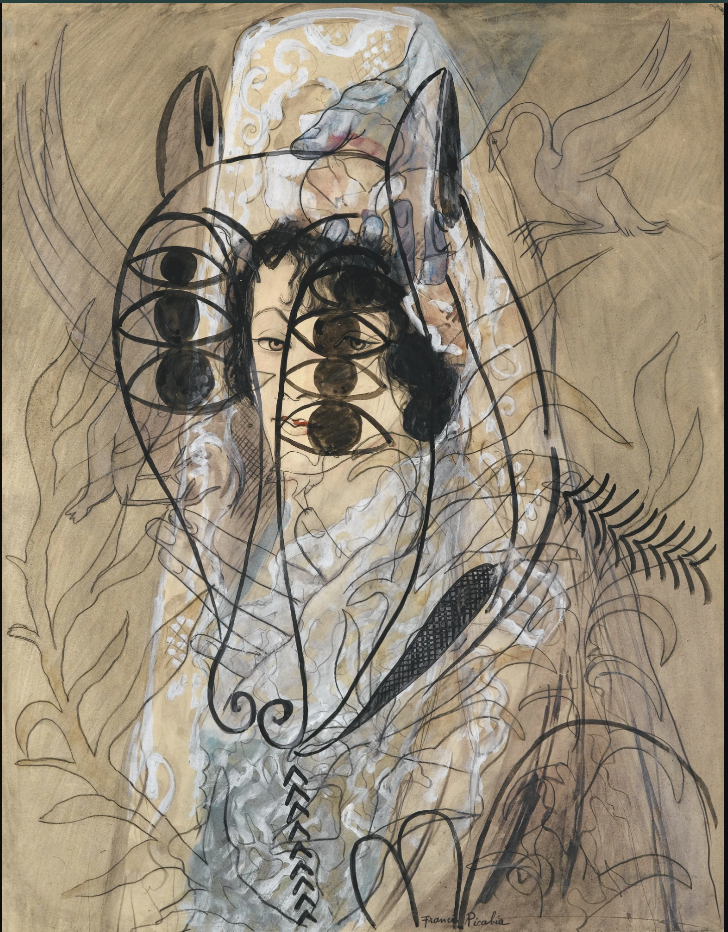
Espagnole et agneau de l'apocalypse, c. 1927–28, gouache, watercolour and brush and ink on paper, 65 × 50 cm, private collection

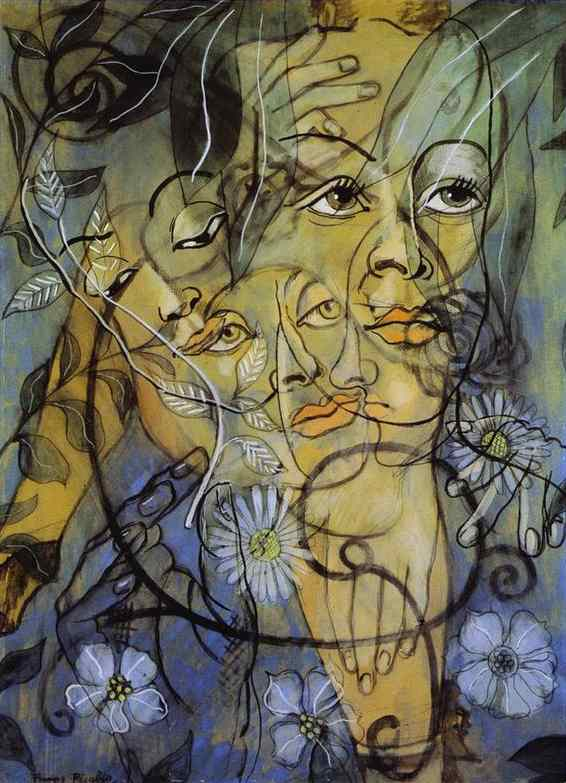
Hera, c. 1929, oil on cardboard, 105 × 75 cm, private collection

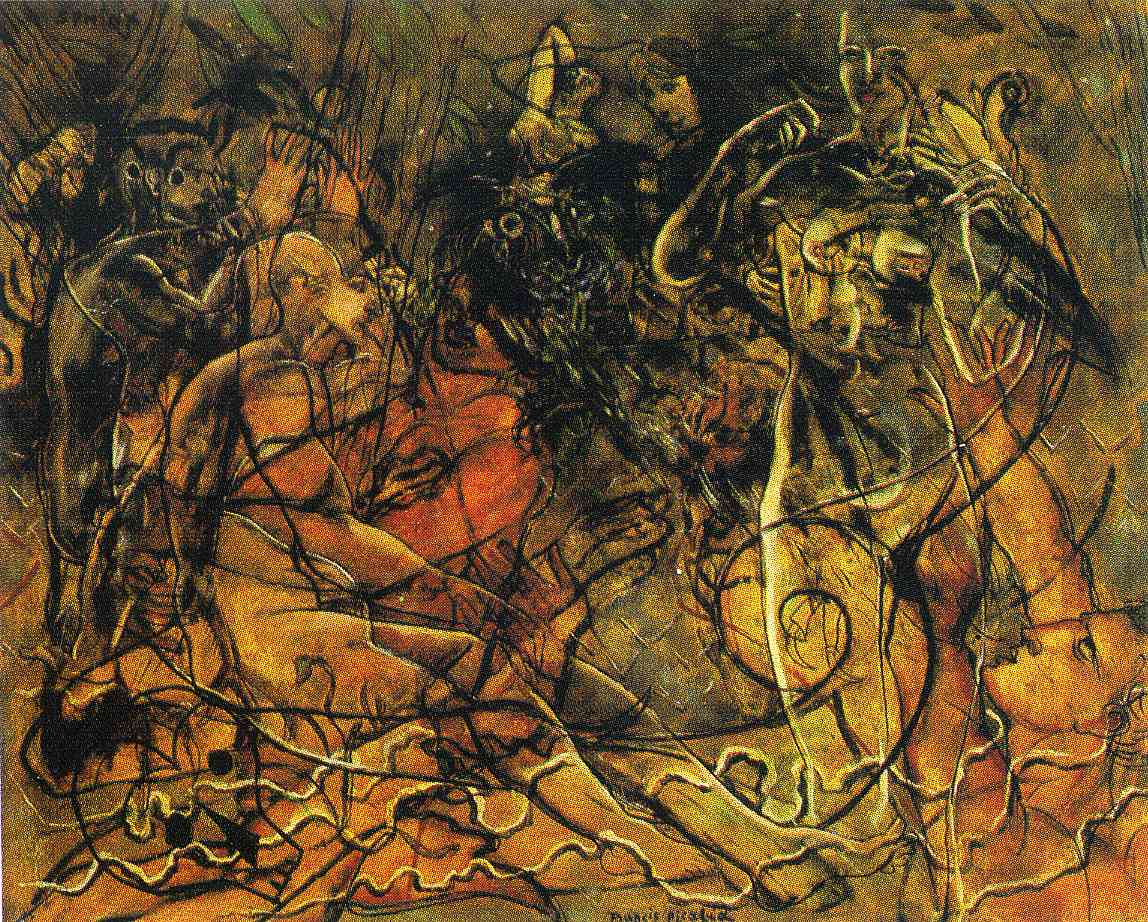
Transparence - Sphinx, 1929, oil on canvas, 131 × 163 cm, Centre Georges Pompidou

== See also ==
- Dadaglobe
- Anti-art

== Bibliography ==
- Allan, Kenneth R. “Metamorphosis in 391: A Cryptographic Collaboration by Francis Picabia, Man Ray, and Erik Satie.” Art History 34, No. 1 (February 2011): 102–125.
- Baker, George. The Artwork Caught by the Tail: Francis Picabia and Dada in Paris. Cambridge, MA: MIT Press, 2007. (ISBN 978-0-262-02618-5)
- Borràs, Maria Lluïsa. Picabia. Trans. Kenneth Lyons. New York: Rizzoli, 1985.
- Calté, Beverly and Arnauld Pierre. Francis Picabia. Tokyo: APT International, 1999.
- Camfield, William. Francis Picabia: His Art, Life and Times. Princeton: Princeton University Press, 1979.
- Hopkins, David. “Questioning Dada’s Potency: Picabia’s ‘La Sainte Vierge’ and the Dialogue with Duchamp.” Art History 15, No. 3 (September 1992): 317–333.
- Legge, Elizabeth. “Thirteen Ways of Looking at a Virgin: Francis Picabia’s La Sainte Vierge.” Word & Image 12, No. 2 (April–June 1996): 218–242.
- Page, Suzanne, William Camfield, Annie Le Brun, Emmanuelle de l’Ecotais, et al., Francis Picabia: Singulier ideal. Paris: Musée d’Art moderne de la Ville de Paris, 2002.
- Picabia, Francis. I Am a Beautiful Monster: Poetry Prose, and Provocation. Trans. Marc Lowenthal, Cambridge, MA: MIT Press, 2007. (ISBN 978-0-262-16243-2)
- Pierre, Arnauld. Francis Picabia: La peinture sans aura. Paris: Gallimard, 2002.
- Wilson, Sarah. "Francis Picabia: Accommodations of Desire – Transparencies 1924–1932." New York: Kent Fine Art, 1989. (ISBN 1-878607-04-9)
