= Gabrièle Buffet-Picabia =

French Dada personality and spouse of artist Francis Picabia (1881–1985)

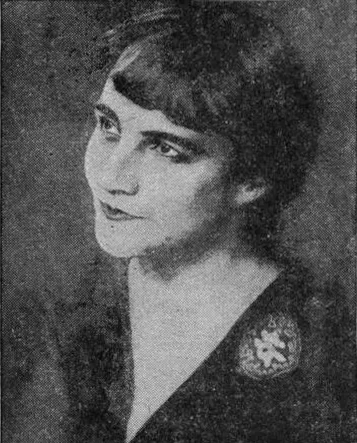
- Born: Gabrièle Buffet; 21 November 1881; Fontainebleau, France
- Died: 7 December 1985 (aged 104); Paris, France
- Occupations: Essayist; Art critic French Resistance member
- Spouse: Francis Picabia

Gabrièle Buffet-Picabia (often spelled Gabrielle Buffet-Picabia; née Buffet; 21 November 1881 – 7 December 1985) was a French art critic and writer affiliated with Dadaism. She was an organiser of the French Resistance and the first wife of artist Francis Picabia.

== Biography ==
Gabrielle Buffet was the daughter of Alphée Buffet and his wife, Laure (née Hugueteau de Chaillé). She studied music at the Schola Cantorum in Paris with Vincent d'Indy, later in Berlin with Ferruccio Busoni. She grew up with a brother artist who painted in the classical manner (See: classicism), far removed from the visionary works of her future husband, the painter Francis Picabia, whom she married in January 1909. Her influence inspired Picabia to compose his paintings as musical pieces.

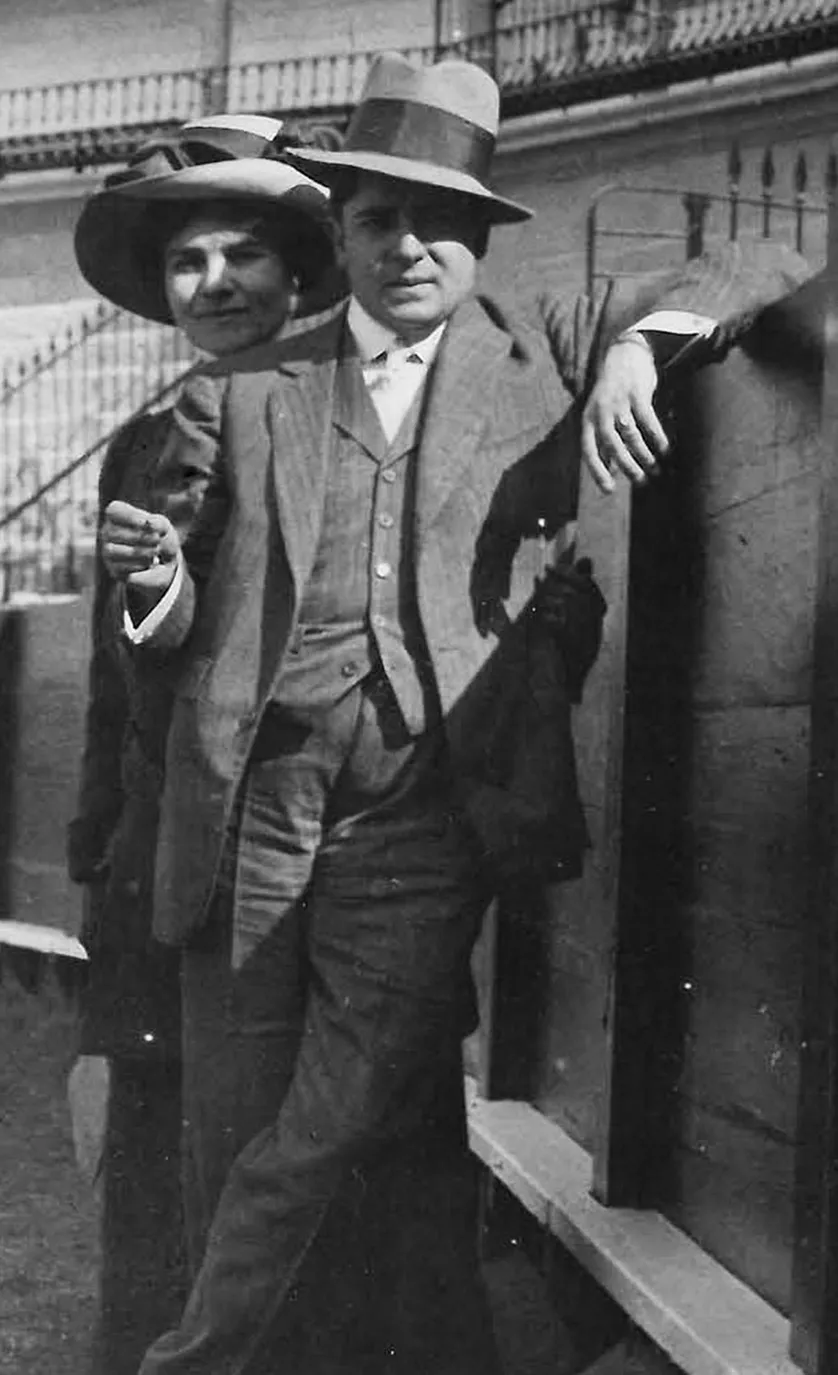
Gabrielle and her husband in Seville in 1909

In Zurich, Gabrielle and Francis met Hans Arp and Tristan Tzara. In October 1912, while she was with her mother in the family home of Étival, Picabia rejoined her along with Guillaume Apollinaire and Marcel Duchamp. Apollinaire there completed his poem Zone, which begins the cycle entitled Alcools.

This journey served as an inspiration to Duchamp who wrote four notes marginales, " Route Jura-Paris " from La Boîte de 1914. Duchamp created a prelude to his work La Mariée mise à nu par ses célibataires, même. On the basis of the meeting, a book was published with essays on Cubism, Les peintres cubistes, by Apollinaire, financed by Picabia. In the magazine View, Charles Henry Ford describes her as one of the first to write a serious account of 'Duchamphenomena'.

The marriage with Francis Picabia, which produced four children, Laure, Pancho, Jeanine and Vincente, ended in divorce in 1930.

== In the Resistance ==
From 1941, during the Second World War, she was a member of the French Resistance in Paris, alongside Samuel Beckett, Mary Reynolds, Suzanne Dechevaux-Dumesnil, and others. She was second in command in her region and her studio was a safe house for soldiers escaping via the Belgian-French line. Her daughter Jeanine was also in the Resistance and the two of them avoided arrest. Others were arrested as their organisation was infiltrated and the Gestapo arrested another daughter, Marie, who was not a member of the Resistance. Marie's husband was away and her children were without their mother so Gabrielle spent time with them in Lyon whilst still working for the Resistance.

Later, she was involved with Maurice Montet as he organised another line in the "south zone". Her significant contribution was later belittled possibly because others could not believe that a middle aged woman had been so involved. In fact, after Montet was arrested as a result of the double agent Jacques Desoubrie she left her place in Dieulefit and went further south climbing over the Pyrennes and travelling to Barcelona and Madrid. She went as far as Gibraltar where she was given a place to stay. She consulted with Donald Darling, a British diplomat and MI9 member known as "Sunday". He had a flat in Main Street, Gibraltar and he organised for her to be evacuated by air to Britain.

== Post-war ==
In 1967 Marcel Janco and Greta Deses made a film titled "Dada" which included interviews with Marcel Duchamp, Max Ernst, Man Ray, Hans Richter and Gabrièle Buffet-Picabia. The film competed in the 2001 Cannes Film Festival.

In 1968 the Hanover Gallery in London had an exhibition of her and her husband's work.

== Death and legacy ==
She died in 1985 at the age of 104.

In August 2017, Gabriële, written by Anne and Claire Berest, was published by Stock. The authors are great-granddaughters of Buffet-Picabia, and their biography underscores Buffet-Picabia's decisive influence within avant-garde circles. According to an interview with the Berests (Bibliothèque Médicis, 2017), a second volume of Buffet-Picabia's life may follow.

== Filmography ==
- Dada at IMDb (1967 documentary by Marcel Janco and Greta Deses)

== Selected publications ==
- Impressionnisme musical. In: Section d'Or, Nr. 1, 9. October 1912
- Modern Art and the public. In: Camera Work, June 1913
- Musique d’aujourd'hui. In: Les Soirées de Paris, Nr. 22, March 1914
- Jean Arp, Essay. In: L’Art abstrait, Presses littéraires de France, 1952
- Aires abstraites. Pierre Cailler Éditeur, Geneva 1957 (foreword by Jean Arp)
- Picabia, l’inventeur. In: L'Œil, Nr. 18, June 1956
- DADA. Dichtungen der Gründer. Dada Gedichte von Andre Breton, Gabrielle Buffet, F. Hardekopf, Emmy Hennings, J. van Hoddis, R. Huelsenbeck, Marcel Janco, W. Kandinsky, Francis Picabia, Walter Serner, Ph. Soupault, Tristan Tzara. Peter Schifferli Verlags AG Die Arche, Zürich 1957
- Rencontres avec Picabia, Apollinaire, Cravan, Duchamp, Arp, Calder. P. Belfond, Paris 1977, ISBN 2-7144-1113-4
- Gabriële, Anne Berest, Claire Berest, Paris, 450p, collection La Bleue, Stock, 2017, ISBN 2234080320

== Translations ==
- Clemens Brentano, Histoire du brave Gaspard et de la belle Annette, Paris, Mercure de France - Bruxelles, Nouvelle Revue de Belgique, 1942
- Vassily Kandinsky, Regard sur le passé, Galerie René Drouin, 1946
