= Anne Berest =

French writer and actress

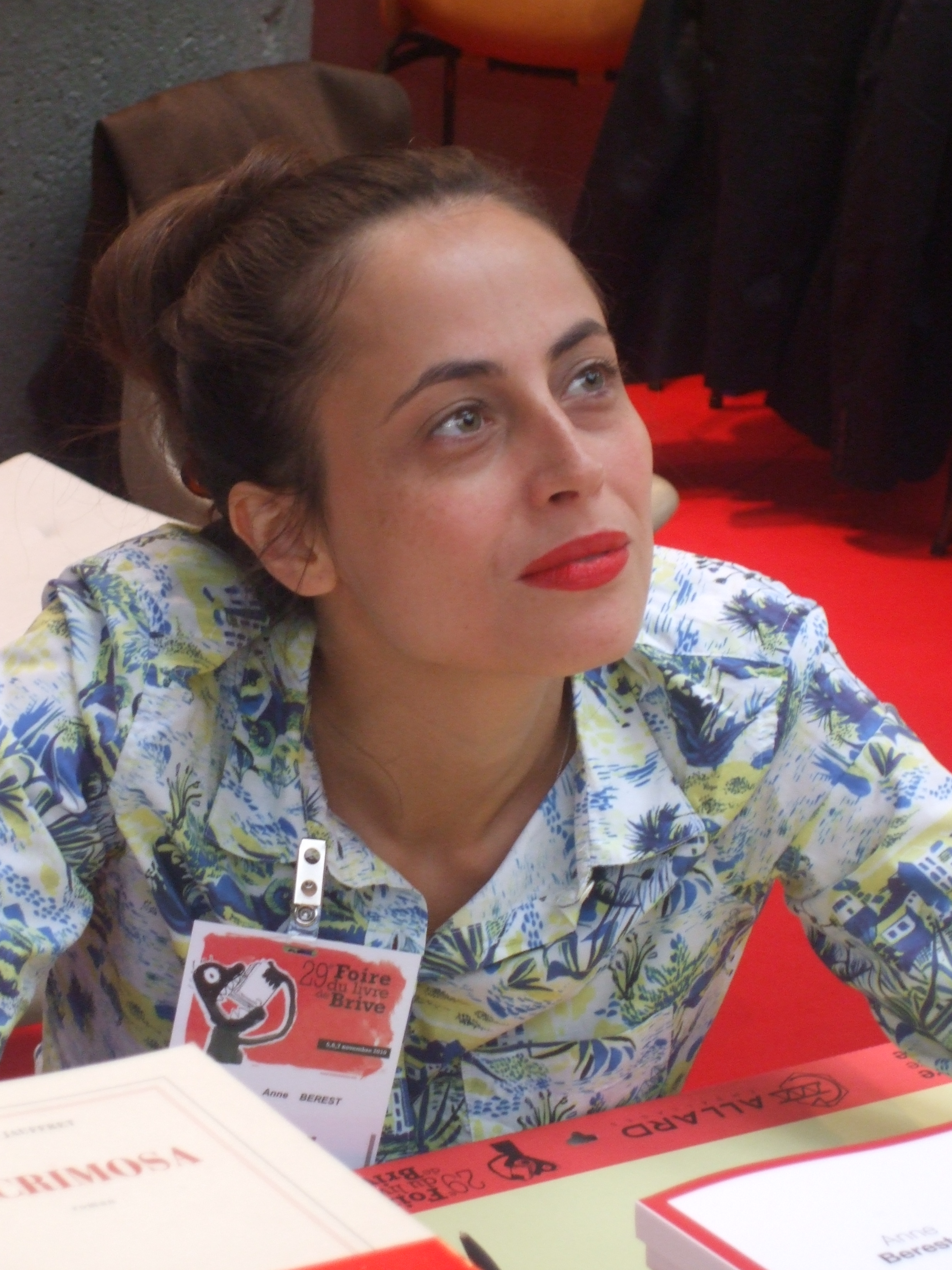
- Anne Berest at the Brive-la-Gaillarde book fair in 2010
- Born: 15 September 1979 (age 47); Paris, France
- Occupations: Writer, actress
- Relatives: Claire Berest (sister); Francis Picabia (great-grandfather); Gabrièle Buffet-Picabia (great-grandmother); Lelia Picabia (mother)
- Writing career
- Notable awards: Grand prix de l'héroïne Madame Figaro de la biographie (2018)

Anne Berest (born 15 September 1979) is a French writer and actress.

== Biography ==
In 2008 she adapted Patrick Modiano's short autobiography Un Pedigree for the theatre with Edouard Baer. Denis Westhoff, son of Françoise Sagan asked Berest to write about the creation of his mother's novel, Bonjour Tristesse. The resulting book, Sagan 1954, was well received by critics: Berest "searched for and found les mot justes".

In 2017, with her sister Claire Berest, she wrote a biography of her great-grandmother Gabrièle Buffet-Picabia. With Gabriële, the Berest sisters succeeded in bringing attention to their great-grandmother's often overlooked life and influence in the art world, specifically within the Dada movement.

Her novel La Carte Postale (The Postcard), was published in 2021 in French and translated into English in 2023 by Tina Kover. The autobiographical novel is entirely based on real events that happened throughout Berest's life. It tells the stories of Anne Berest's relatives' experience during World War Two by piecing together the research that Anne and her mother did to learn more about where they came from. In the novel, Anne becomes determined to figure out who sent her family a mysterious postcard in 2003 with the names of their family members who died in Auschwitz written on the back. In 2021 La Carte Postale made the final selection for the Prix Goncourt as well as the Prix Renaudot.

In 2026, Berest curated Picabia. Open the Gates of Night (Picabia. Aprire le porte della notte) at the Palazzo Reale Milano; the exhibit was the largest exhibition of Picabia’s work in Italy.

== Books ==
- La Fille de son père, éditions du Seuil, 2010, ISBN 978-2-02-102783-9
- Les Patriarches, éditions Grasset, 2012 ISBN 978-2-246-80084-2
- Sagan 1954, éditions Stock, 2014, ISBN 978-2-234-07740-9
- How to be Parisian wherever you are (with Audrey Diwan, Caroline de Maigret and Anne Berest, Doubleday, 2014, ISBN 978-0-09-195809-1
- Recherche femme parfaite, éditions Grasset, 2015, ISBN 978-2-246-85244-5
- Gabriële (with Claire Berest), éditions Stock, 2017 ISBN 978-2-234-08618-0
- La Visite, suivi de Les Filles de nos filles, Actes Sud, 2020, ISBN 978-2-330-13154-8
- La Carte postale, éditions Grasset, 2021 ISBN 9782246820505; translated into English in 2023 by Tina Kover, The Postcard
- Finistère, Éditions Albin Michel, 2025, ISBN 9782226487186

== Screenwriter ==
- Que d'Amour! (Just Love) by Marivaux, telefilm directed by Valérie Donzelli shown on Arte in 2014 - co-writer
- Paris Etc., series directed by Zabou Breitman shown on Canal+ in 2017 - co-writer
- Mytho, directed by Fabrice Gobert, released on Netflix in 2019 - co-writer (and co-creator)
- Valiant Hearts (2021), film directed by Mona Achache
