= Claire Berest =

French writer

Claire Berest (born 14 July 1982 in Paris) is a French writer. Her partner is lawyer and writer, Abel Quentin.

== Biography ==
Before publishing her first novel, Berest worked as a teacher and completed a maîtrise (master's degree) at the Sorbonne. She found teaching in a poor socio-economic area difficult and resigned after a few months, describing the situation as being in 'permanent war'. Based on her experience, she wrote a book about her disillusionment with the French school system, La Lutte des classes.

With her sister Anne, she wrote Gabriële, a tribute to their great grand-mother Gabrièle Buffet-Picabia. Her novel about Frida Kahlo, Rien n'est noir received the Grand prix des lectrices de Elle in 2020.

== Books ==
- Mikado, éditions Léo Scheer, 2011
- L’orchestre vide, éditions Léo Scheer, 2012
- La lutte des classes : Pourquoi j'ai démissionné de l'Éducation nationale, éditions Léo Scheer, 2012
- Enfants perdus, éditions Plein jour, 2014
- Bellevue, Éditions Stock, 2016
- Gabriële (with Anne Berest), Éditions Stock, 2017
- Rien n’est noir, Éditions Stock, 2019
- Artifices, Éditions Stock, 2021
