= Abel Quentin =

French writer and lawyer

Abel Quentin is a French lawyer and writer. His partner is fellow writer, Claire Berest.

== Works ==
=== Soeur ===
Published in 2019, Soeur was Quentin's first published novel. About the Islamic radicalisation of a teenager, the novel made the first selection for the Prix Goncourt and won the Prix Première in 2020.

=== Le voyant d'Étampes ===
Quentin's second novel is about Jean Roscoff, a retired alcoholic academic who unwittingly finds himself the victim of 'woke politics' following the publication of his book on an obscure American poet. Le voyant d'Étampes has received rave reviews and was considered a 'serious candidate for the Goncourt' by Le Soir. The novel won the Prix de Flore and made it to the second round of the Prix Goncourt as well as the first selection for the Prix Renaudot.

== Bibliography ==
- Soeur, Éditions de l'Observatoire, 2019, ISBN 979-10-329-0591-3
- Le voyant d'Étampes, Éditions de l'Observatoire, 2021, ISBN 979-10-329-0929-4
- Cabane, Éditions de l'Observatoire, 2024, ISBN 979-10-329-2543-0
