= The Postcard (novel) =

2021 novel by Anne Berest

- Author: Anne Berest
- Original title: La carte postale
- Translator: Tina Kover (English)
- Language: French
- Genre: True fiction, Historical novel
- Set in: Paris, 1942, 2020
- Publisher: Europa editions
- Publication date: 2021
- Publication place: France
- English publication date: 2023
- Media type: Hardback
- ISBN: 978-1-60945-838-6

The Postcard (La Carte postale) is a 2021 novel by French writer Anne Berest. Berest's sixth novel, it was first published in French by Éditions Grasset on August 18, 2021. An English translation of the novel by Tina Kover was published in 2023 by Europa Editions.

Based in Berest's real-life experience, The Postcard follows the author/narrator as she investigates the origins of an anonymous postcard and rediscovers the history of her ancestors who died in Auschwitz. The novel won the American Choix Goncourt Prize.

== Summary ==
An unsigned postcard arrives in the mail at Anne Berest's parents' house on January 6, 2003. On one side, an old image of the Palais Garnier Opera House of Paris is pictured; on the other side are the names of her mother's grandparents, Ephraïm and Emma, her aunt, Noémie, and uncle, Jacques, all of whom were deported to Auschwitz in 1942. None survived.

About fifteen years later, Berest remembers the anonymous postcard and determines to find the sender. She encourages her mother, Lélia Picabia, to help her. Focusing on the historical traces of her dead relatives, they put together several hypotheses of how and why the mysterious postcard was sent with the help of a private detective, a criminologist, archival research, and interviews with villagers who knew the family before their arrest. After four years of research, she unexpectedly discovers the sender of the postcard.

Through her quest, which stretches back to the dawn of the twentieth century, Anne Berest retraces the destiny of her Rabinovitch ancestors, their flight from Russia, voyage to Latvia and then Palestine, and finally, their arrival in Paris where their peace is ultimately disrupted by the outbreak of World War II and its devastation to the Jewish population in France. In the process, she also becomes familiar with who her grandmother Myriam was the only family member to survive the Holocaust.

== "Un roman vrai" ==
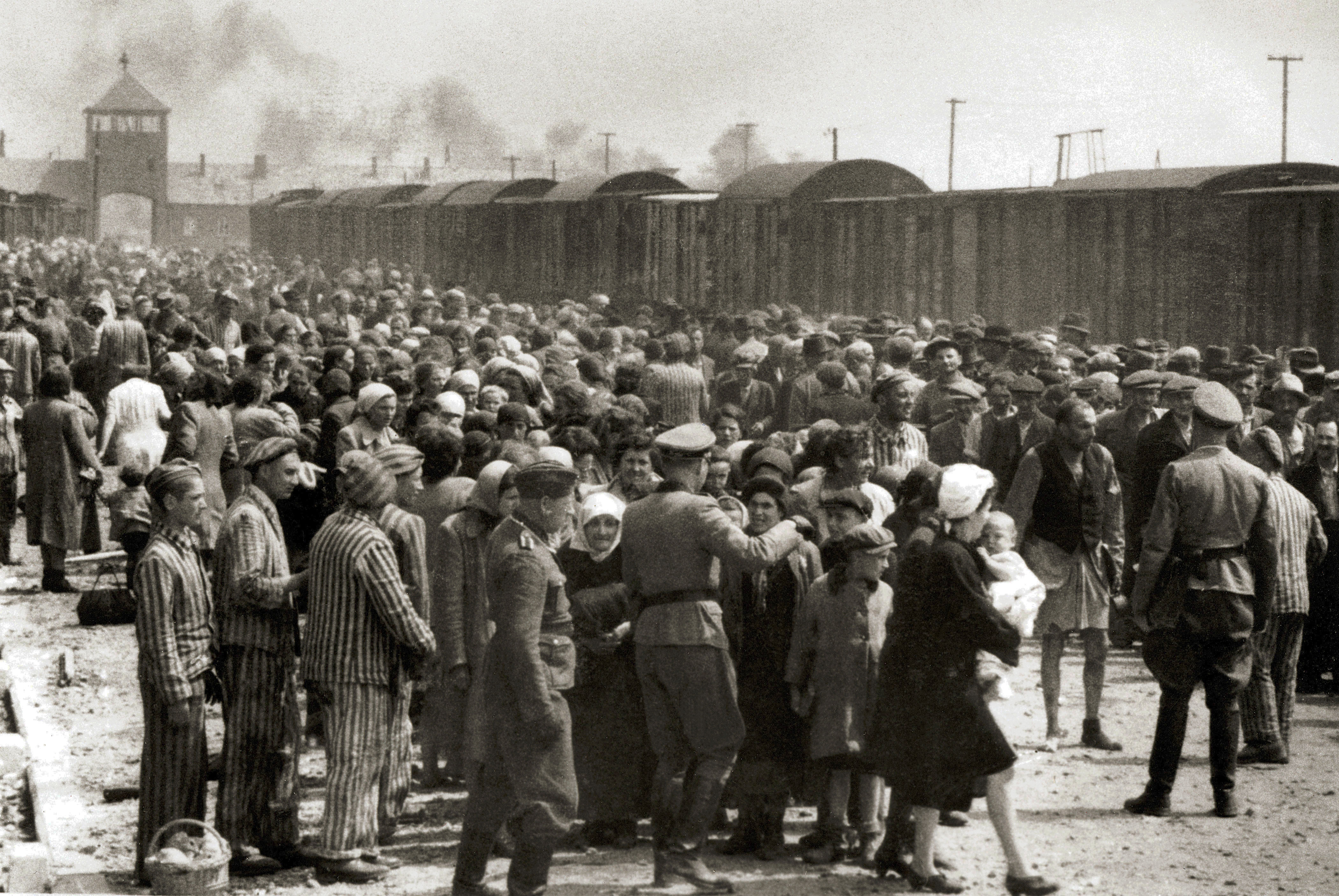
Image of Auschwitz concentration camp where Berest's family members were killed in 1942.

Berest calls The Postcard a "roman vrai" (true novel) because it is based on the lives of real people and true historical events. The book interweaves her family's experience during World War II and contemporary times, including the story of her family members who died in Auschwitz and how her grandmother Myriam Rabinovitch survived. The novel thus recovers the past while including Berest's experience of researching and discovering her past. The mysterious postcard that arrived at the Berest's family home in 2003 really did arrive on their doorstep containing the names of their family members who died in Auschwitz.

While the details of this book are fictionalized, The Postcard was thoroughly researched, containing little that cannot be traced back to historical references. To write this novel, Berest took on the role of historian by diving into Holocaust research. While writing the historical passages, like the descriptions of concentration camps and the Vel' d'Hiv roundup, she did not write a word that she had not read somewhere in memoirs or historical accounts so that the novel could be as historically accurate as possible.

Anne Berest's strategy for fictionalizing these historical events was intentional. The novel delves into the experience of Jewish people before, during, and after World War II, so she wanted to tell the story through dialogue because it is a central aspect to Jewish thought. In the novel, the history of the Rabinovitchs is told to Anne by her mother, Lélia Picabia, who remains true to history by describing how she came to know each fact, while also embellishing certain details for the sake of the narrative.

Despite the truth of the story, Berest wrote The Postcard as a novel so that she could have the freedom to change some details, like the names of those whose characters who took antisemitic actions and the name of the town that her family lived in during the war. In an interview with NPR she explains that she did so to protect the grandchildren of those people from being shamed or attacked by those upset with their grandparents' actions.

== Themes ==
In a 2023 interview with NPR, Anne Berest discussed the theme of "invisible transmissions," the notion that one tends to repeat similar actions and possess the same sentiments and fears as their ancestors without consciously knowing about those experiences. While investigating her family members, Berest learned that there were many overlapping aspects of her life and the lives of her relatives, which she weaves into The Postcard as demonstrations of her own invisible transmissions. She uses this theme inspirationally, as the invisible transmission of her relatives' experiences into herself means that, while they are no longer alive, their memories live through her. From the perspective of Anne's grandmother Myriam, despite her avoidance of discussing the lives of her family members after the Holocaust, she still finds ways to ensure that their lives will be known.

Anne Berest also addresses identity in her novel, especially pertaining to her relationship with her Jewish identity. She has spoken about her daughter coming home and telling her grandmother, Lelia, that "people don't like Jews at school," an event in the novel that reveals Berest's internal conflict about how to address this with her daughter and prompts her to begin investigating the postcard. The identities of many of her family members were hidden before her investigation started, as Jewish people after the war were afraid to have it be publicly known they were Jewish, to the point that Myriam baptized Lélia to hide their Jewish identity. Particularly in Myriam's case, she found it too painful to discuss her parents and siblings with her own daughter and granddaughter, which left a large part of their history unknown to them. This allows for the personal journey that Anne goes through in her novel in search for how her Jewish identity fits into her life as she learns more about the past that was forced into hiding well beyond the end of World War II.

== Awards ==
In September 2021 The Postcard became a finalist for the Goncourt Prize.

In April 2022 The Postcard won the first annual Choix Goncourt United states.

In November 2021 The Postcard won the Prix Renaudot des Lycéans.

The Postcard was one of Time Magazine's must-read books of 2023.

The Postcard was a finalist for the 2023 Book Club category and the fiction category for the National Jewish Book Award.

The Postcard was one of the Library Journal's best books of 2023.

== Controversy ==
In 2021 La Carte Postale was involved in a major literary scandal involving the Prix Goncourt, a major award for literature in France. In September 2021, La Carte Postale became a finalist for the Prix Goncourt. However, just nine days after the vote, one of the jurors, Camille Laurens, wrote a brutal review of the La Carte Postale, calling it "Shoah (film) for idiots." Laurens was revealed to be romantically involved with François Noudelmann, whose novel Les Enfants de Cadillac was also on the shortlist for the prize. Noudelmann's novel also explored his Jewish ancestors' experiences of persecution, including during World War II.

Jean Yves Mollier, a French publishing expert, asserts that Laurens "straight-out assassinated one of the candidates." While Laurens is known for her particularly harsh reviews, the timing of her review of La Carte Postale, accompanied by her connection to Noudelmann, was considered suspicious.

== Translation ==
Tina Kover was responsible for the English translation of La Carte Postale from its original publication in French. Kover has discussed how the process of translating a novel that reflects the experiences of real people who suffered during the Holocaust was challenging and emotional. Not only did she mirror the vulnerability and reality that Anne Berest portrayed in the original French version of the novel, but she also felt that, by translating the experiences of Berest's ancestors, Kover lived through it herself. By translating La Carte Postale, Tina Kover continued Anne Berest's goal of allowing her family members to live through her writing, preventing them from being lost among the many names that never made it out of the Holocaust.
