= Éditions Stock =

French publisher

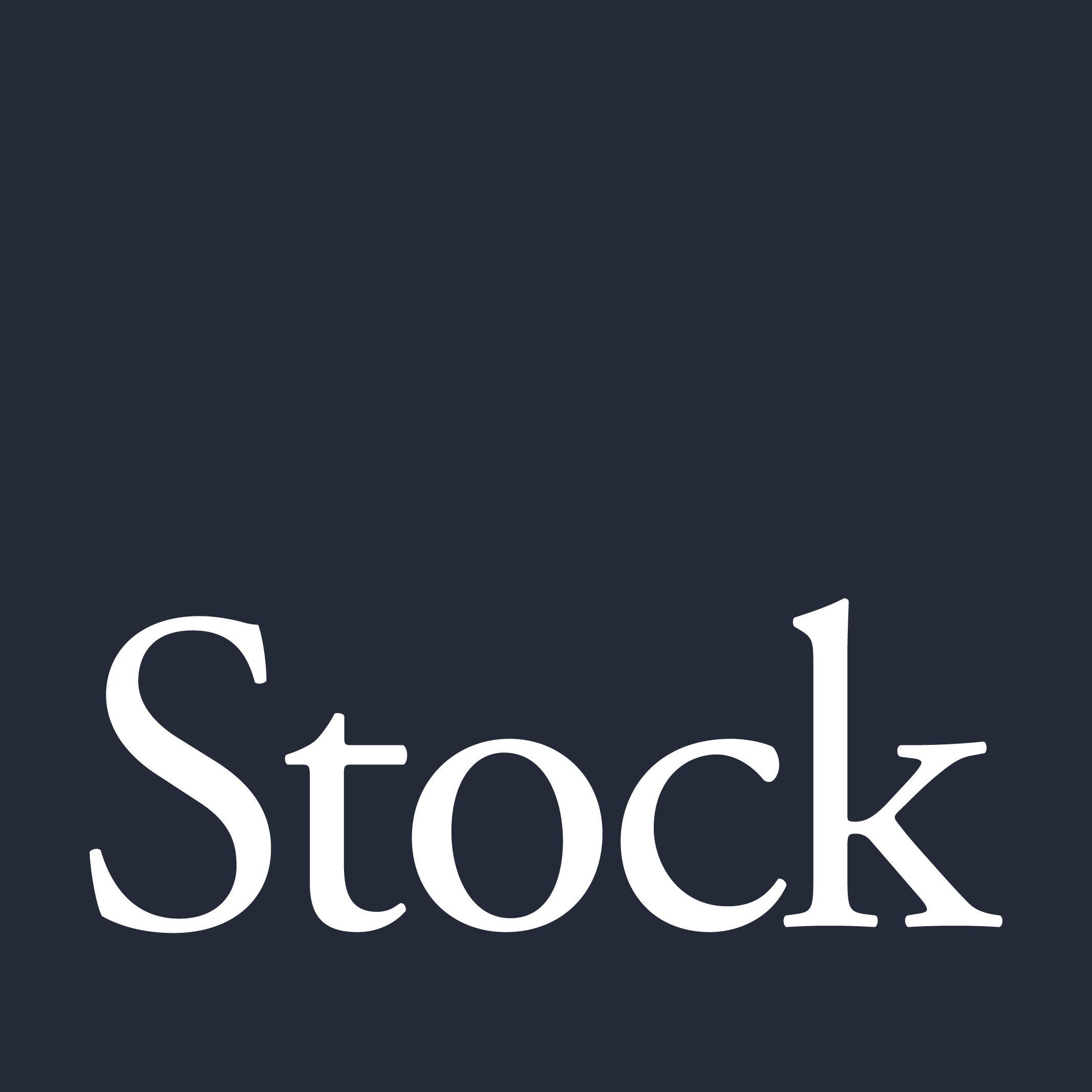
- Parent company: Lagardère Group
- Founded: 1708; 318 years ago
- Founder: André Cailleau
- Country of origin: France
- Headquarters location: Paris
- Key people: Manuel Carcassonne (managing director)
- Publication types: Books
- Official website: www.editions-stock.fr

Éditions Stock is a French publisher, a subsidiary of Hachette Livre, which itself is part of the Lagardère Group.

It was founded in the 18th century by André Cailleau, who was succeeded in 1753 by Nicolas-Bonaventure Duchesne, who published Voltaire and Rousseau. At the beginning of the 19th century, the publisher was called "Au Temple du goût". In the middle of the century it changed hands and was eventually bought up by Pierre-Victor Stock, who ran it from 1877 to 1921 and gave it its current name.

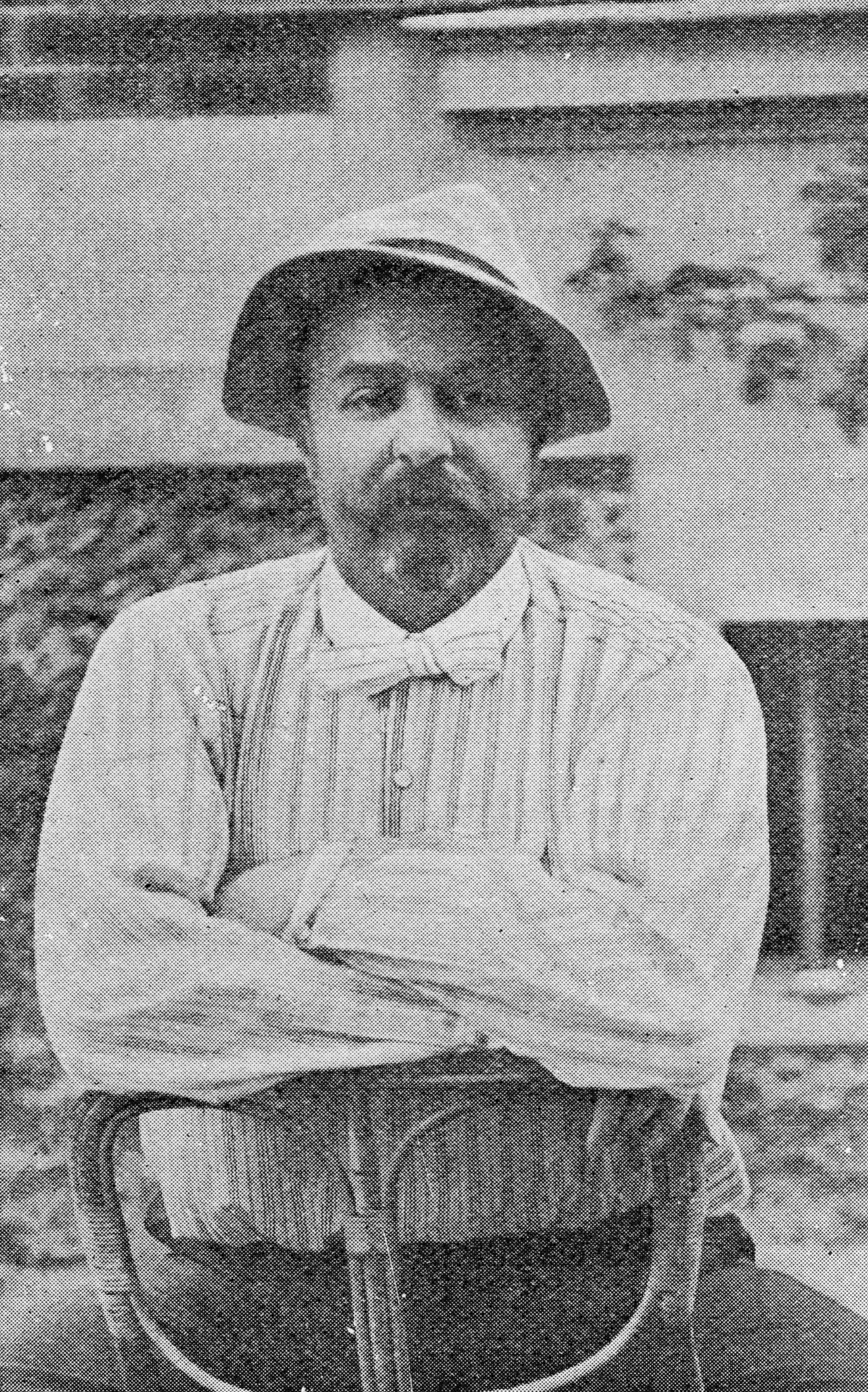
Pierre-Victor Stock

During the Dreyfus affair, Stock published many essays on the subject, including Dreyfus's own Lettres d'un innocent. In his memoir Mémorandum d'un éditeur, Pierre-Victor Stock estimated that Stock had published around 150 works connected with the Dreyfus affair.

In the early 20th century, Stock ran into legal and financial difficulties. It was taken over in 1921 by Maurice Delamain and Jacques Chardonne, who renamed it "Stock, Delamain et Boutelleau". In 1961, Delamain and Chardonne sold Stock to Hachette.

Since the mid-20th century, Stock has specialised in foreign literature and non-fiction.

== Book series ==
- Bibliothèque Cosmopolite
- Les Contemporains: Œuvres et Portraits du XXe Siècle
- La Cosmopolite
- Échanges
- Les Femmes au temps de...
- Un Livre, une Vie
- Nouveau Cabinet Cosmopolite
- Stock-Bleu
