= Tristan Tzara bibliography =

The works of Tristan Tzara include poems, plays and essays. A number of his works contain artwork by well-known artists of the time, including Pablo Picasso and Henri Matisse.

- La Première Aventure céleste de monsieur Antipyrine (The First Celestial Adventure of Mr. Antipyrine; 1916) with colour wood engravings by Marcel Janco.
- Monsieur Aa l'antiphilosophe (Mr. Aa the Antiphilosophy; 1916–1924).
- Lampisteries (1917–1922).
- Vingt-cinq poèmes (Twenty-five poems; 1918), with engravings by Hans Arp.
- Cinéma Calendrier du cœur abstrait, Maisons (1920), with wood engravings by Hans Arp.
- Le cœur à barbe (The Bearded Heart; 1922).
- De nos oiseaux : poèmes (Of Our Birds: Poems; 1923), with illustrations by Hans Arp.
- Sept Manifestes Dada (Seven Dada Manifestos; 1924), with drawings by Francis Picabia.
- Minutes pour géants (1916–1924).
- Faites vos jeux (1923).
- Mouchoir de nuages (Handkerchief of Clouds;1924), with etchings by Juan Gris.
- Indicateur des chemins de cœur (1928), with etchings by Louis Marcoussis.
- L’arbre des voyageurs (The Tree of Voyagers; 1930).
- Piège en herbe (1930).
- Essai sur la situation de la poésie (Essay on the Situation of Poetry; 1931).
- L’Homme approximatif (Approximate Man; 1931), with etching by Paul Klee.
- La Fonte des ans (1931).
- La Puisatier des regards (1932).
- Où boivent les loups (1932).
- Le Désespéranto (1932–1933).
- L’Antitête (1933).
- L’Abrégé de la nuit (1934).
- Personnage d'insomnie (1934).
- Grains et Issues (1935) with etching by Salvador Dalí.
- Les mutations radieuses (1935–1936).
- La Main passe (1935).
- Ramures (1936), with drawing by Alberto Giacometti.
- Sur le champ (1937).
- La Deuxième Aventure céleste de monsieur Antipyrine (1938).
- Midis gagnés (1939), with drawings by Henri Matisse.
- Ça va (1944).
- Une Route Seul Soleil (1944).
- Le Cœur à gaz (The Gas Heart; 1946), with illustrations by Max Ernst.
- Entre-temps (1946).
- La Signe de vie (1946).
- Terre sur terre (1946), with lithograph by André Masson.
- Vingt-cinq et un poème (1946), with drawings by Hans Arp.
- La Dialectique de la poésie (1947).
- La Fuite : poème dramatique en quatre actes et un épilogue (1947).
- Le Surréalisme et l’Après-Guerre (1947).
- Morceaux choisis (1947).
- Midis gagnés republished expanded edition (1948).
- Picasso et les chemins de la connaissance (1948).
- Phases (1949), Seghers, with portrait by Alberto Giacometti.
- Sans coup férir (1949), with etching by Suzanne Roger.
- Parler seul (1948), with lithographs by Joan Miró.
- De mémoire d'homme (1950), with lithographs by Pablo Picasso.
- Le poids du monde (1951).
- La Première Main (1951).
- La Face Intérieure (1953).
- Picasso et la poésie (1953).
- L'Egypte; Face à Face (1954), with photo by Etienne Svedala.
- À Haute Flamme (1955) with burin engravings by Pablo Picasso.
- La bonne heure (1955), with an engraving by Georges Braque.
- Le Temps naissant (1955), with illustration by Nejad Devrim.
- Miennes (1955) with etchings by Jacques Villon.
- Parler seul (1955), reedtion with engraving by Hans Arp.
- Le Fruit permis : poèmes (1956), with illustrations by Sonia Delaunay.
- Frère Bois (1956), with an engraving by Jean Hugo.
- La Rose et le Chien (1958), with drawings by Pablo Picasso.
- Vigies (1960), with etchings by Camille Bryen.
- Juste présent (1961), with etchings by Sonia Delaunay.
- Lampisteries, précédé de Sept manifestes Dada (1963), with portraits drawings by Francis Picabia.
- Premiers Poèmes (translated by Claude Sernet) (1965).
- 40 chansons et déchansons (1972), with colour lithographs by Jacques Hérold.
- Œuvres complètes Flammarion (1975–1982).
- Cosmic realities vanilla tobacco dawnings (1975).
- Découverte des arts dits primitifs, suivi de Poèmes nègres (2006).

== See also ==
- Tristan Tzara
