= Céline Arnauld =

Wallachian Dadaist

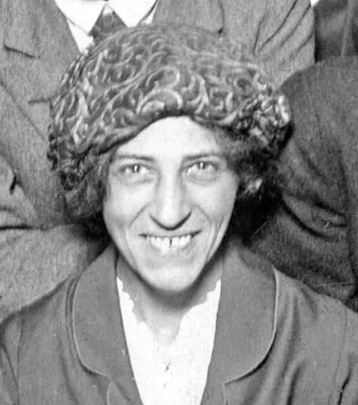
- A cropped image of Arnauld from a group portrait of the Dadaists, 1921
- Born: Carolina Goldstein; September 20, 1885; Călărași, Kingdom of Romania
- Died: December 23, 1952 (aged 67); Paris, Île-de-France, French Fourth Republic
- Spouse: Paul Dermée
- Writing career
- Language: French
- Years active: 1914–1948
- Notable work: Tournevire
- Literary movement: Dadaism

Céline Arnauld (born Carolina Goldstein, 20 September 1885 – 23 December 1952) was a writer associated with Dadaism.

== Biography ==
Arnauld’s poetry appears earliest in her first published volume of 1914, titled La Lanterne magique (transl. The Magic Lantern). Poèmes à claires-voies (transl. Openwork Poems) of 1920, Point de mire (transl. Focal Point) of 1921, and Guêpier de diamants (transl. Diamond Trap) of 1923 followed during the Paris Dada years. She finds its fullness in La Nuit reve tout haut (1934) and in Heures intactes (1936). She published until 1948, though all of her texts are rare and some are considered lost. While occasionally working in prose, Arnauld was a consistently published poet, albeit by small publishers. Her first and only published novel, Tournevire, is an experimental text of 1919. She was published in the Dada journals DADAphone, Cannibale, and Z, and was a director of the short-lived but appreciated journal Projecteur. These early poems revolved around the theme of transport, referring to modern travel means and metaphysical transit.

Arnauld also took part in Dada performances. In March 1920, she is credited in the program of the Manifestation Dada de la Maison d’Oeuvre as “the pregnant woman” in La Première Aventure Céleste de M. Antipyrine (transl. The First Heavenly Adventure of Mr. Antipyrine) by Tristan Tzara. Two months later, she was recorded as an author and performer of a dialogue titled Jeu d’échecs (transl. Chessboard) in the Festival Dada at the Salle Gaveau.

Arnauld died by suicide in Paris. She was married to Paul Dermée (1886–1951), a Belgian writer, poet, and literary critic.

A pamphlet of poetry was published by Clayton Eshleman in 1977 titled The Gospel of Celine [sic] Arnauld. Eshleman, asked by Arnauld to translate some of her work, wrote that he found her works to be “run-of-the-mill French poetry, worn-out language, superficial emotion, nothing new in short.” However, he was still inspired to create his own version of a narrative while in a trance. In her study of Arnauld for her book Dada’s Women, Ruth Hemus allows the American poet creative license but states that he “failed to comprehend the conditions under which Arnauld was writing, was ignorant of the rebellion inherent in her participation in Dada and did not perceive any aspects of innovation in her body of work.”

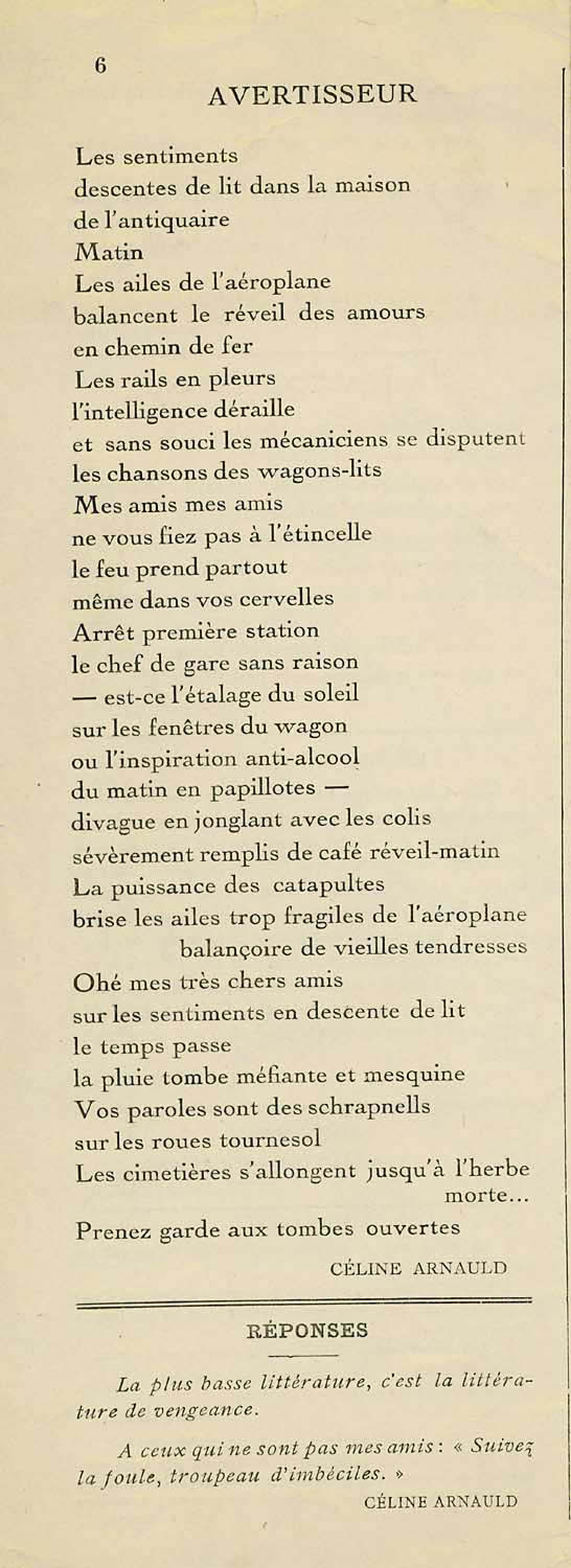
A page from Z, published in Paris during March 1920.
