= Portrait of Tristan Tzara =

Painting by Robert Delaunay

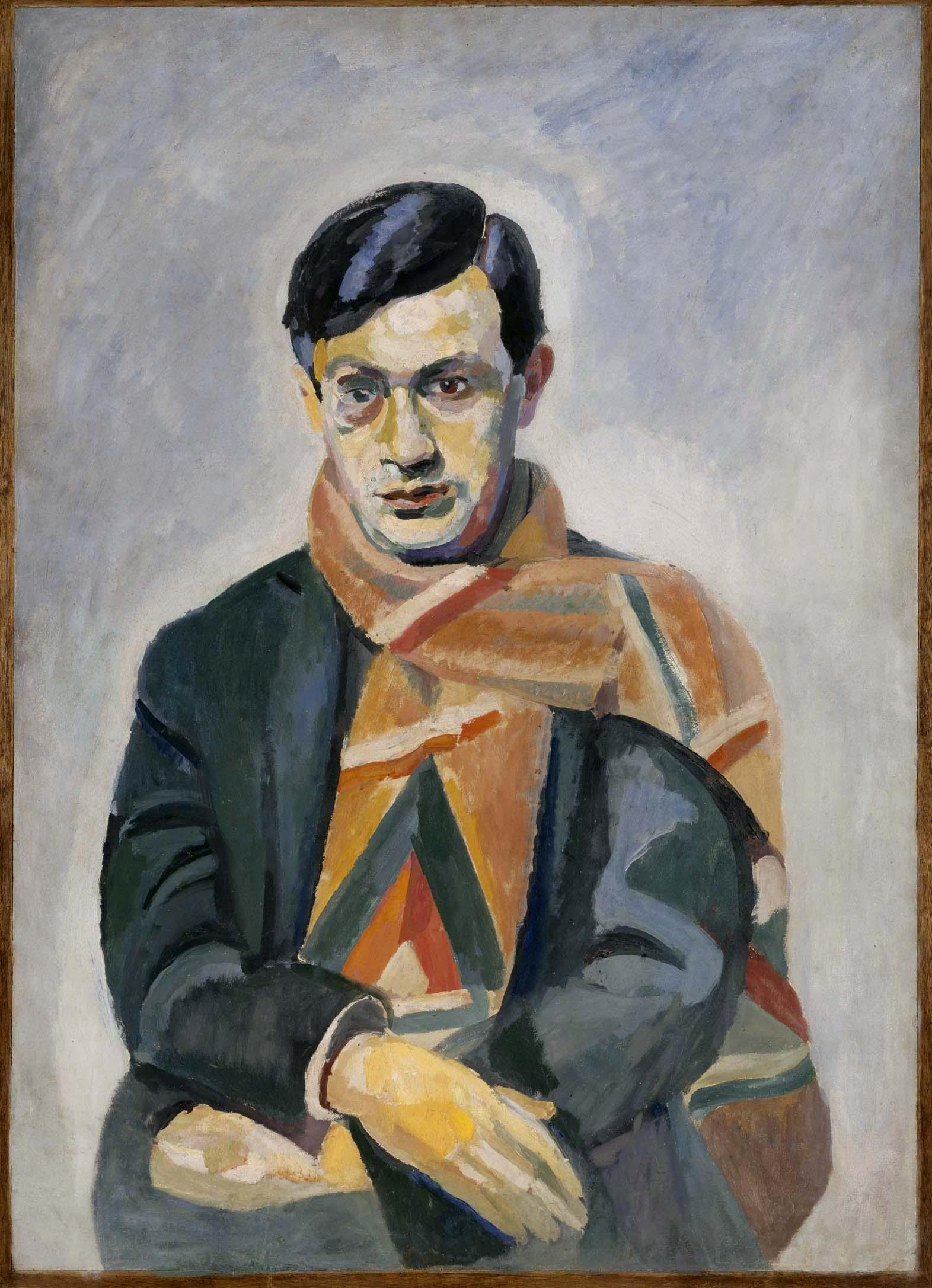
- Artist: Robert Delaunay
- Year: 1923
- Medium: oil on paperboard
- Dimensions: 104.5 cm × 75 cm (41.1 in × 30 in)
- Location: Museo Nacional Centro de Arte Reina Sofía, Madrid

Portrait of Tristan Tzara is an oil on paperboard painting by the French painter Robert Delaunay, created in 1923. It depicts the Romanian poet Tristan Tzara, a leading name of the Dada movement and a personal friend of the artists couple Robert and Sonia Delaunay. It is held in the Museo Nacional Centro de Arte Reina Sofía, in Madrid.

== History ==
During the First World War, Robert and Sonia Delaunay took refuge in Spain and Portugal, where they continued their artistic work on the observation of light and colors. On their return, the influential artists of the 1910-1914 era had dispersed or died, or had been replaced by new artists, the Dadaists, who later would become the Surrealists. The Delaunays joined the new artistic and social life of their time, becoming friends with new influential artists, such as Philippe Soupault (of whom Robert also painted a portrait), André Breton, Louis Aragon, Jean Cocteau, or once again Igor Stravinsky and Vladimir Mayakovsky. But the most faithful friend of the decade, the one who spent many evenings with the Delaunays, was Tristan Tzara, the founder and leader of the Dada movement.

== Description and analysis ==
Tzara is seated, on a grey background, he wears a monocle and has his arms crossed. The most striking element of the painting isn't the poet's thoughtful face, but the orange scarf he wears, which is in the center of the painting and occupies the largest space. Moreover, it is the scarf who shows the most striking and flamboyant colors, while Tzara's look seems pale and weathered. This scarf was created by Sonia Delaunay using the simultaneist technique, by painting on the fabric. The portrait is more realistic than orphic but still shows some elements from that movement, particularly in the treatment of the scarf and the face of Tzara.

This portrait was created at a time when Robert Delaunay had returned to figuration, after 1918. He would abandon it definitively in the 1930s.
