= Handkerchief of Clouds =

Play written by Tristan Tzara

- Written by: Tristan Tzara
- Original language: French
- Genre: Dada

Premiere
- Date premiered: 17 May 1924
- Place premiered: Théâtre de la Cigale, Paris

Handkerchief of Clouds: A Tragedy in Fifteen Acts (French: Mouchoir de Nuages) is a French-language Dadaist play by Romanian-born author Tristan Tzara. Tzara described it as an "ironic tragedy" or a "tragic farce", composed of 15 short acts, each with an accompanying commentary, with a strong influence from "the serialized novel and the cinema." Its action, he continues, should be staged on a platform in the centre of a box-like room "from which the actors cannot leave" It was first staged on 17 May 1924 at the Théâtre de la Cigale in Paris. The play was Tzara's last Dada production.

== See also ==
- The Gas Heart, a Dadaist play by Tzara first performed in 1921.

== Sources ==
- Gordon, Mel, ed. 1987. Dada Performance. New York: PAJ Publications. ISBN 1-55554-011-2.
- Melzer, Annabelle. 1976. Dada and Surrealist Performance. PAJ Books ser. Baltimore and London: The Johns Hopkins UP, 1994. ISBN 0-8018-4845-8.
- Richter, Hans. 1997. Dada: Art and Anti-Art. Trans. David Britt. Updated edition. London: Thames & Hudson. ISBN 0-500-20039-4.
- Robbins, Aileen, trans. 1987. A Handkerchief of Clouds: A Tragedy in Fifteen Acts. By Tristan Tzara. In Gordon (1987, 137-161).
