= Greta Knutson =

Swedish artist (1899–1983)

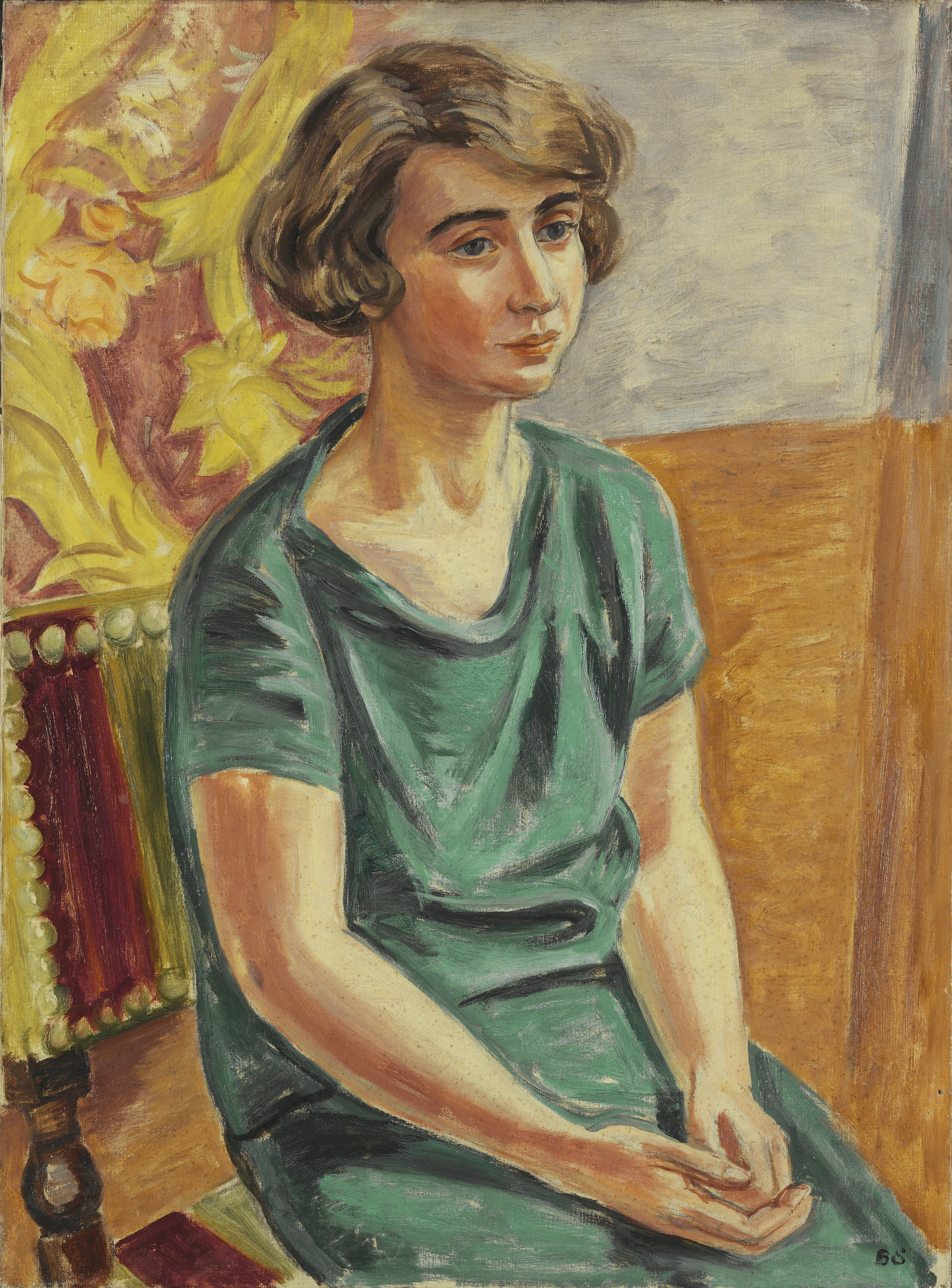
- Portrait of Knutson by Birger Simonsson
- Born: 10 November 1899; Stockholm, Sweden
- Died: 6 March 1983 (aged 83–84); Paris, France
- Other name: Greta Knutson-Tzara
- Occupations: Modernist visual artist, art critic, writer, poet
- Spouse: Tristan Tzara (m. 1925-1942)
- Children: 1

Greta Knutson, also known as Greta Knutson-Tzara (1899–1983), was a Swedish modernist visual artist, art critic, short story writer, and poet. A student of André Lhote who adopted Abstraction, Cubism and Surrealism, she was also noted for her interest in phenomenology. Knutson was married to Romanian-born author and co-founder of Dadaism Tristan Tzara, but they later divorced.

== Biography ==
Born in Stockholm, Greta Knutson was a Swedish surrealist painter, art critic, poet, and writer. She was born to an affluent family in 1899 and was fluent in several foreign languages. She attended the Carl Wilhelmson Academy of Fine Arts for one year, then studied at the Kungliga Konsthögskolan, and settled in Paris, France during the early 1920s. It was there that she began frequenting Andre Lhote's studio and became his disciple. When she moved to Paris her stay became permanent and she would only ever return to Sweden occasionally. She was interested in Cubism, Surrealism, and Abstraction as art concepts. She was interested in the change of art from the real world around us to the surreal world of the unconscious. It was also in France that Knutson met Tzara, reportedly in 1924. She married him on 8 August 1925. The couple had a son, Christophe, born on 15 March 1927, at Neuilly-sur-Seine.

In 1925, Knutson inherited a large fortune. With funds from her inheritance, Tzara built the family residence in Montmartre, commissioned to architect Adolf Loos (a former figure of the Modernist Movement in Vienna). The house turned into a social spot for other Surrealists. She partly modified the structure to accommodate her personal studio, which Loos had omitted in his original design.

Knutson adopted Surrealism during the 1930s. She and Tristan Tzara however parted in 1937 (they were pronounced divorced on 25 October 1942). During the war, Knutson had a love affair with the French poet and resistance leader René Char. Knutson painted several portraits of Char. She also broke with Surrealism, pursuing her interest in Phenomenology (philosophy), and in particular in philosophers Edmund Husserl and Martin Heidegger. During the late 1930s, she painted a portrait of Swiss sculptor Alberto Giacometti; she later recounted that her model confessed to her that his borrowings from African art, although discussed by critics, were only coincidental, and had to do with the fact that primitivism was in fashion.

Knutson was a productive writer, publishing essays of art criticism, and, only sporadically, poems. She wrote in both Swedish and French. Late in her life, she also authored novellas and prose poetry fragments. Together with poet Gunnar Ekelöf, she translated works of Swedish literature into French, but her own poetry was never issued as a volume during her lifetime. “The story of the cliffside path/Will be a path that licks the flagstone/Will lift its hand toward the iron/ Path to the broken porch shelter of the pursued/ night came morning gone/toward the gentle flock and the boat sleeping/ against the temple of the riverbank.”, an excerpt of her poem, translated from French, that originally was in Le Surrealisme ASDLR. She also had several solo art exhibits, notably one in Paris in 1929 and one in Stockholm in 1932.

Greta Knutson committed suicide in Paris in 1983.

== Legacy ==
Greta Knutson's French-language poems were translated into Swedish by poet Lasse Söderberg, and, together with her husband, she was the subject of a study by art historian Cecilia Sjöholm. Söderberg, Sjöholm, actor Christian Fex and writer Jonas Ellerström took part in the Madame Tzara? event, held at the Romanian Cultural Institute in Stockholm during October 2007.
