= The Gas Heart =

Play written by Tristan Tzara

- Original language: French
- Written by: Tristan Tzara
- Characters: Mouth; Ear; Eye; Nose; Neck; Eyebrow
- Genre: Dadaism

Premiere
- Date: 1921
- Place: Galerie Montaigne; Paris

The Gas Heart or The Gas-Operated Heart (French: Le Cœur à gaz) is a French-language play by Romanian-born author Tristan Tzara. It was written as a series of non sequiturs and a parody of classical drama—it has three acts despite being short enough to qualify as a one-act play. A part-musical performance that features ballet numbers, it is one of the most recognizable plays inspired by the anti-establishment trend known as Dadaism. The Gas Heart was first staged in Paris, as part of the 1921 "Dada Salon" at the Galerie Montaigne.

The play's second staging, as part of the 1923 show Le Cœur à barbe ("The Bearded Heart") and connected to an art manifesto of the same name as the latter, featured characteristic costumes designed by Sonia Delaunay. The show coincided with a major split in the avant-garde movement, which, in 1924, led Tzara's rivals to establish Surrealism. Opposing his principles to the dissident wing of Dada, represented by André Breton and Francis Picabia, Tzara rallied around him a group of modernist intellectuals, who endorsed his art manifesto. The conflict between Tzara and Breton culminated in a riot, which took place during the premiere of The Gas Heart.

== Dramatic form ==
In The Gas Heart, Tzara appears to have aimed at overturning theatrical tradition, in particular the three-act play, which resulted in the suggestion that the text is "the greatest three-act hoax of the century". American literary historian David Graver, who compares The Gas Heart with Le Serin muet, a play by Tzara's friend Georges Ribemont-Dessaignes, notes of the two texts that, together, they "pulverize the elements of conventional theater they use so finely that few gestures or remarks cohere in any recognizable order. These manifestations of dada at its most extreme reduce theatrical spectacle to a kind of white sound, the significance of which depends almost exclusively upon the cultural context in which it is presented."

Tristan Tzara himself offered insight into the satirical and subversive intent of The Gas Heart, writing: "I beg my interpreters to treat this play as they would a masterpiece like Macbeth, but to treat the author, who's no genius, without any respect [...]" Tzara, whose own definition of the text described it as "a hoax", suggested that it would "satisfy only industrialized imbeciles who believe in men of genius", and argued that it offered "no technical innovation".

The play takes the form of an absurd dialogue between characters named after human body parts: Mouth, Ear, Eye, Nose, Neck, and Eyebrow. The entire exchange between them uses and reinterprets metaphors, proverbs and idiomatic speech, suggesting the generic roles traditionally assigned by folklore to the body parts in question, rather than situations involving the characters themselves, with lines uttered in such manner as to make the protagonists look obsessed. In one such example of a non sequitur, Ear says: "The eye tells the mouth: open your mouth for the candy of the eye." It is probable that such exchanges between Eye and Mouth are a form of courtship, a matter which, according to theater critic Peter Nichols, may help one understand why some of the exchanges in the background turn from nonsensical to "a more lyrical expression of desire." This situation, Nichols proposes, may also explain the title of the play, a probable allusion to "the power of love as a kind of life-force".

In addition to this motif, the play features a series of seemingly metaphysical observations, which characters make about themselves or about unspecified third parties. For example, Mouth states: "Everyone does not know me. I am alone here in my wardrobe and the mirror is blank when I look at myself." Another such line reads: "The void drinks the void: air was born with blue eyes, that's why it endlessly swallows aspirin." One other exchange, in which Ear compares herself to a "prize horse", results later in the text in an actual metamorphosis, through which she becomes the horse Clytemnestra (named after the femme fatale character in Greek myths).

A series of dance routines, described by British theater historian Claude Schumacher as "bewildering ballets", accompanies the dialogues. In its third act, The Gas Heart also features a dance performed by a man fallen from a funnel, which, American critic Enoch Brater argues, shares characteristics with Alfred Jarry's ubuesque situations. Critic Michael Corvin also notes that the position of characters as specified by Tzara, alternating between an extreme height above the audience or episodes of collapsing on the stage, is a clue to how the protagonists relate to one another, and in particular to the tribulations of their love affairs. For both the third act and the play itself, Tzara's original text culminates in doodles, which alternate the various spellings of a group of letters with drawings of hearts pierced by arrows. According to Brater: "Here the dramatic genre seems to have broken down completely."

== Early production history ==
The Gas Heart was first staged as part of a Dada Salon at the Galerie Montaigne by the Paris Dadaists on June 6, 1921. The cast included major figures of the Dada current: Tzara himself played the Eyebrow, with Philippe Soupault as the Ear, Théodore Fraenkel as the Nose, Benjamin Péret as the Neck, Louis Aragon as the Eye, and Georges Ribemont-Dessaignes as the Mouth. The production was received with howls of derision and the audience began to leave while the performance was still in progress.

The collaboration between André Breton and Tzara, begun during the late 1910s, degenerated into conflict after 1921. Breton, who objected to Tzara's style of performance art and the Dada excursion to Saint-Julien-le-Pauvre, was also reportedly upset by the Romanian's refusal to take seriously the movement's informal prosecution of reactionary author Maurice Barrès. A third position, oscillating between Tzara and Breton, was held by Francis Picabia, who expected Dada to continue on the path of nihilism.

The first clash between the three factions took place in March 1922, when Breton convened the Congress for the Determination and Defense of the Modern Spirit, which rallied major figures associated with the modernist and avant-garde movements. Attended by Tzara only as a means to ridicule it, the conference was used by Breton as a platform for attacking his Romanian colleague. In reaction to this, Tzara issued the art manifesto The Bearded Heart, which was also signed by, among others, Péret, Marcel Duchamp, Jean Cocteau, Paul Éluard, Man Ray, Theo van Doesburg, Hans Arp, Vicente Huidobro, Ossip Zadkine, Erik Satie, Jean Metzinger, Paul Dermée, Serge Charchoune, Marcel Herrand, Clément Pansaers, Raymond Radiguet, Louis-Ferdinand Céline, Cécile Sauvage, Léopold Survage, Marcelle Meyer, Emmanuel Fay, Ilia Zdanevich, Simon Mondzain, and Roch Grey.

Tzara celebrated the formation of this new group with a Dada show, also titled The Bearded Heart, hosted by Paris's Théâtre Michel (July 6, 1923). According to music historian Steven Moore Whiting, the Romanian writer "cast his net too widely. The programme was a volatile hodge-podge of ex-Dada, pre-Dada and anti-Dada", while the audience, art critic Michel Sanouillet argued, comprised "gawkers and snobs [...] as well as artists and those in the know, who were attracted by the prospect of watching wolves devour each other." Tzara's play was one of the attractions, but the event also featured music by Georges Auric, Darius Milhaud and Igor Stravinsky, films by Man Ray, Charles Sheeler and Hans Richter, as well as another play by Ribemont-Dessaignes (Mouchez-vous, "Blow Your Noses"). There were also readings from the writings of Herrand, Zdanevich, Cocteau and Philippe Soupault, as well as exhibits of design works by Sonia Delaunay and Doesburg. Whiting notes that controversy erupted when Soupault and Éluard found their writings "being read in the same events as those of Cocteau", and that no explanation was provided for presenting works by Auric, "in view of his alliance with Breton." He also recounts that Satie unsuccessfully sought to make Tzara reconsider the choice for musical numbers weeks before the premiere.

The new stage production of The Gas Heart was a more professional one, with designers and a full crew of technicians—although Tzara neither directed nor acted in this performance. Sonia Delaunay designed and costumed the production, creating eccentric trapezoid costumes of thick cardboard, their angular fragmentation recalling Spanish painter Pablo Picasso's designs for Parade, but in this case ostensibly rendering the performers' bodies two-dimensional and immobile. According to Peter Nichols, Delaunay's contribution formed an integral part of the performance, with the costumes being "a visual clue to [the characters'] one-dimensionality."

A riot broke out just as The Gas Heart was premiering, which, according to poet Georges Hugnet, a first-hand witness, was provoked by Breton, who "hoisted himself on the stage and started to belabor the actors." Also according to Hugnet, the actors could not run away because of their restricting costumes, while their attacker also managed to assault some of the writers present, punching René Crevel and breaking Pierre de Massot's arm with his walking stick. Although they had beforehand shown a measure of solidarity with Tzara, Péret and his fellow writer Éluard are reported to have helped Breton cause more disturbance, breaking several lamps before the Préfecture de Police forces could intervene. Hugnet recounts: "I can still hear the director of Théâtre Michel, tearing his hair at the sights of the rows of seats hanging loose or torn open and the devastated stage, and lamenting 'My lovely little theater!' "

Art historian Michael C. FitzGerald argues that the violence was sparked by Breton's indignation over Massot having condemned Pablo Picasso in the name of Dada. Reportedly, Massot's speech also included denunciations of André Gide, Duchamp and Picabia, to which, FitzGerald notes, "no one took offense." FitzGerald also recounts that, after breaking Massot's arm, Breton returned to his seat, that the audience was subsequently ready to assail him and his group, and that an actual brawl was averted only because "Tristan Tzara alerted the waiting police". According to Whiting the scuffles "continued outside the theatre after the lights were snuffed".

== Legacy ==
The Théâtre Michel show, and the play itself, are traditionally viewed as the final event in the evolution of Dada as a cultural movement, paraphrased by critic Johanna Drucker as "the 'death' of Dada". Hans Richter, who contributed to the 1923 show, wrote: "Le Cœur à barbe and Le Cœur à gaz were Dada's swan song. There was no point in continuing because nobody could any longer see any point. [...] All this was linked with the movement's gradual loss of its inner power of conviction. The more it lost this power, the more frequent became the struggles for power within the group, until the hollow shell of Dada finally collapsed." Whiting also writes: "The Soirée drove the last nail into the coffin of the movement that Cocteau had all too aptly characterized as 'le Suicide-Club'." As another consequence of the performance, Tzara unsuccessfully sought to have Éluard sued (while the theater refused to host any other stagings of the play).

The Gas Heart endured as one of the most noted among Tzara's writings, as well as among Dada plays in general. New York Times chronicler D. J. R. Bruckner argues: "Few Dada plays survive; this one is exquisite [...]." The text was received with interest by the avant-garde movements of Central and Eastern Europe. In Hungary, it was staged as early as the 1920s by the Expressionist theater company of Ödön Palasovszky (in a Hungarian-language translation by Endre Gáspár). In 1930, Tzara produced and directed the film Le Cœur à barbe, which starred some of the original show's main protagonists. The post-World War II productions of the play include the 1976 staging at the University of Iowa Intermedia program (with uncredited performance by Ana Mendieta) and the 2001 Israeli modern dance adaptation by Gábor Goda and the Vertigo Dance Company.

While noting that Tzara's play shares a number of motifs with Not I, a 1972 dramatic monologue by Irish playwright Samuel Beckett, Enoch Brater also argues that the latter is more accomplished and different in tone and that The Gas Heart is one of several "parodies of theatrical conventions rather than significant breakthroughs in the development of a new dramatic form."

English singer-songwriter David Bowie's costume from his 1979 appearance on variety sketch show SNL was directly inspired by Delaunay's 1923 costumes.

== Bibliography ==
- Enoch Brater, Beyond Minimalism: Beckett's Late Style in the Theater, Oxford University Press, Oxford, 1987. ISBN 0-19-506655-3
- Annabelle Melzer, Dada and Surrealist Performance, Johns Hopkins University Press, Baltimore & London, 1994. ISBN 0-8018-4845-8
- Hans Richter, Dada. Art and Anti-art, Thames & Hudson, London & New York, 2004. ISBN 0-500-20039-4
