= Serge Charchoune =

Russian painter and poet

- Born: Sergei Ivanovich Charchoun; August 4, 1888; Bougourouslan, Russian Empire
- Died: November 24, 1975 (aged 87); Villeneuve-Saint-Georges, France

Serge Charchoune (French pronunciation: [sɛʁʒ ʃaʁʃun]) or Sergey Sharshun (Russian: Сергей Иванович Шаршун) was a Russian painter and the first Russian Dada poet. Born August 4, 1888, in Buguruslan, Russia, Charchoune lived most of his life in France where he died in Villeneuve-Saint-Georges on November 24, 1975.

== Biography ==
Serge Charchoune briefly studied art in Moscow before being drafted into the army in 1910. He deserted and in 1912, he went to Paris where he quickly became interested in the Cubist Movement, studying under Henri Le Fauconnier. During the war, he took refuge in Barcelona where he met the painters Albert Gleizes, Marie Laurencin, and Francis Picabia.

After the Bolshevik Revolution of October 1917, he tried to return to Russia, but failed and ended back in Paris. He attended Dadaist meetings at the café Certá and participated in Dada demonstrations, notably the "Trial of Barrès" organized by André Breton. He founded the Dadaist group Palata poetov and in 1921 wrote Foule immobile: poème, arguably his most significant contribution to the movement. He exhibited at the Montaigne Gallery in a show organized by Tristan Tzara as well as at the Berlin gallery Der Sturm.

From the 1930s to the 1950s, Charchoune experimented with both abstract and representational figures, often mixing the two. His style, as described by British artist and critic Merlin James, was an "alternative" abstraction as compared to many of his contemporaries. Charchoune took inspiration for his artworks from the music of classical composers like Bach and Tchaikovsky

Charchoune's work can be found in the collections of the Museum of Modern Art, Centre Georges Pompidou, Moscow Museum of Modern Art and National Museum of Serbia.

== Bibliography ==
- Alain Bosquet Charchoune, une archéologie de l'âme.
- Isabelle Ewig Serge Charchoune, soleil russe, Galerie Thessa Herold, Paris, 2007.
- René Guerra Profil de Charchoune, Galerie de Seine, Paris, 1973.
- Laurent Le Bon (sous la direction de) Dada, catalogue de l'exposition présentée au Centre national d'art et de culture Georges-Pompidou du 5 octobre 2005 au 9 janvier 2006, Éditions du Centre Pompidou, Paris, 2005.
- Giovanni Lista Dada libertin & libertaire, L'Insolite, Paris, 2005.
- Pierre Guénégan, Charchoune, Annoted catalog of the Painted Works, vol.1 (1912-1924), Préface de Dina Vierny, Publisher : Lanwell & Leeds Ltd, Carouge, Switzerland, 2005, (ISBN 978-2-9700494-1-8)
- Pierre Guénégan, Charchoune, Annoted catalog of the Painted Works, vol.2 (1925-1930), Texte sur le purisme par Françoise Ducros, Publisher : Lanwell & Leeds Ltd, Carouge, Switzerland, 2007, (ISBN 978-2-9700494-2-5)
- Pierre Guénégan, Charchoune, Annoted catalog of the Painted Works, vol.3 (1931-1950), Publisher : Lanwell & Leeds Ltd, Carouge, Switzerland, 2009, (ISBN 978-2-9700494-3-2)
- Pierre Guénégan, Charchoune, Annoted catalog of the Painted Works, vol.4 (1951-1960), Texte de Pierre Lecuire et Henri Raynal, Publisher : Lanwell & Leeds Ltd, St. Alban, England, 2011, (ISBN 978-2-9700494-4-9)
- Pierre Guénégan, Charchoune, Annoted catalog of the Painted Works, vol.5 (1961-1975), Texte de René Guerra, Publisher : Lanwell & Leeds Ltd, St. Alban, England, 2012, (ISBN 978-2-9700494-7-0)
- Pierre Guénégan, Purism & its International Influence - Directory with 50 iconic artists, Publisher : Lanwell & Leeds Ltd, St. Alban, England, 2019, (ISBN 978-2-9700494-8-7)
