= Littérature =

French literary and surrealistic magazine

- First issue, 1919
- First issue: March 19, 1919; 106 years ago
- Final issue: June 1924; 101 years ago
- Country: France
- Based in: Paris
- Language: French

Littérature was a literary and surrealistic magazine edited by André Breton, Philippe Soupault, and Louis Aragon. Its first issue was published on March 19, 1919. Dwindling circulation would prompt Breton to terminate publication after the August 1921 issue. In March 1922, he relaunched and rebranded the review with a recurring cover depicting a Man Ray drawing of a shiny top hat, and the title, "Littérature: New Series." The new direction of the review would eventually be solely under the direction of Breton after the departure of Aragon and Soupault. Breton would have the cover image created by Man Ray replaced by new drawings each month created by Francis Picabia, to whom he gave carte blanche. Picabia drew on religious imagery, erotic iconography, and the iconography of games of chance.

In 1923, the magazine was incurring reduced sales so Breton decided to limit the publication to special issues. The first appeared on October 15, 1923; the next appeared in June 1924, and no others followed.

== Exhibitions ==
"Man Ray, Picabia et la revue Littérature (1922-1924)" 2 July - 15 September 2014 at Centre Pompidou.
