= Paul Dermée =

Wallonian poet

Proconsul Dada Paul Dermée
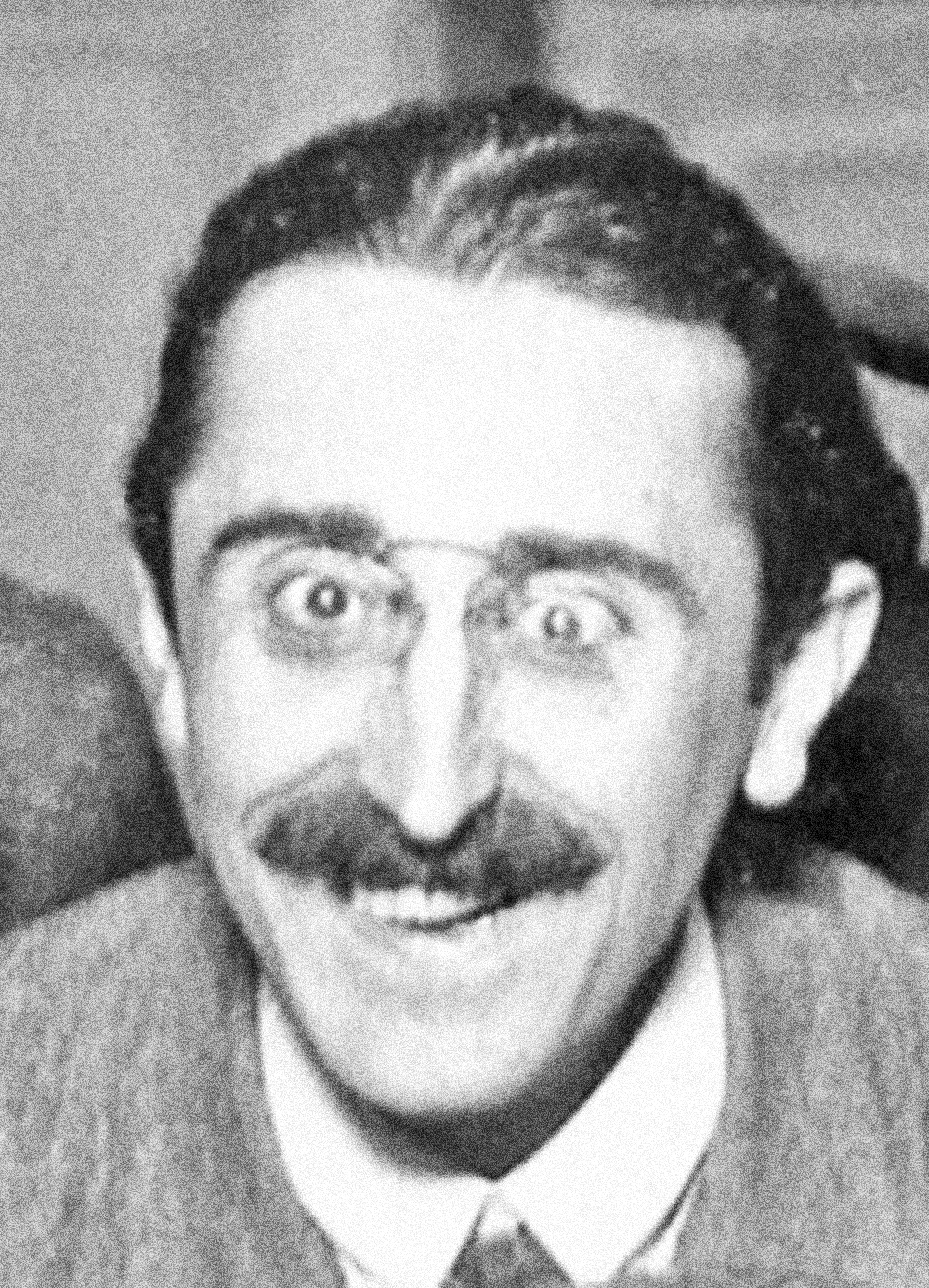
- A cropped image of Dermée from a group portrait of the Dadaists, 1921
- Born: Camille Janssen; 13 April 1886; Liège, Wallonia, Kingdom of Belgium
- Died: 27 December 1951 (aged 65); Paris, Île-de-France, French Fourth Republic
- Resting place: Cimetière parisien de Thiais
- Education: École Nationale des Chartes
- Spouse: Céline Arnauld
- Writing career
- Language: French
- Movement: Dadaism

Paul Dermée (1886–1951) was a Belgian writer, poet, and literary critic. Born Camille Janssen in Liège, Belgium in 1886, he died in Paris in 1951.

He knew the painters Pablo Picasso, Juan Gris, Sonia and Robert Delaunay and the poets Valery Larbaud and Max Jacob.

His wife, Céline Arnauld, was also an active poet and participant in the Parisian Dadaist movement.

Discovered by the writer Tristan Tzara, Dermée took the risk during WWII to disseminate the Dada review in the province of Zurich. In exchange, he received the title of Proconsul Dada.

He was director of the magazine L'Esprit Nouveau.
