= Gârceni =

- Commune
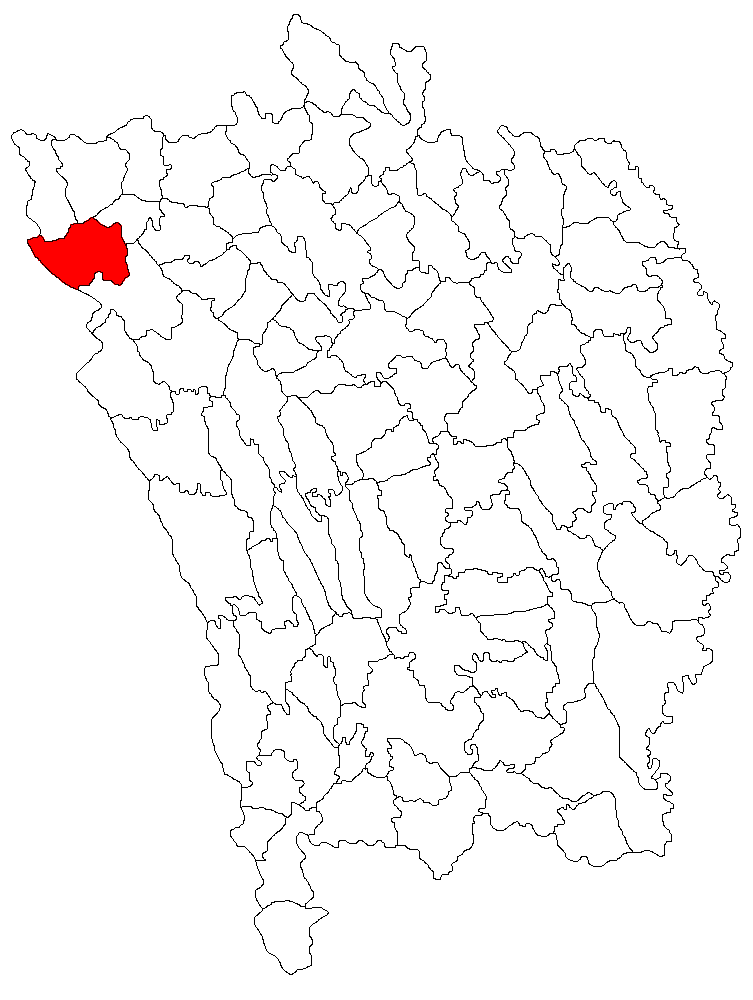
- Location in Vaslui County

- Location in Romania
- Coordinates: 46°46′N 27°17′E
- Country: Romania
- County: Vaslui
- Population (2021-12-01): 2,204
- Time zone: EET/EEST (UTC+2/+3)
- Vehicle reg.: VS

Gârceni is a commune in Vaslui County, Western Moldavia, Romania. It is composed of six villages: Dumbrăveni, Gârceni, Racova, Racovița, Slobozia and Trohan.
