= Caoutchouc (painting) =

1909 painting by Francis Picabia

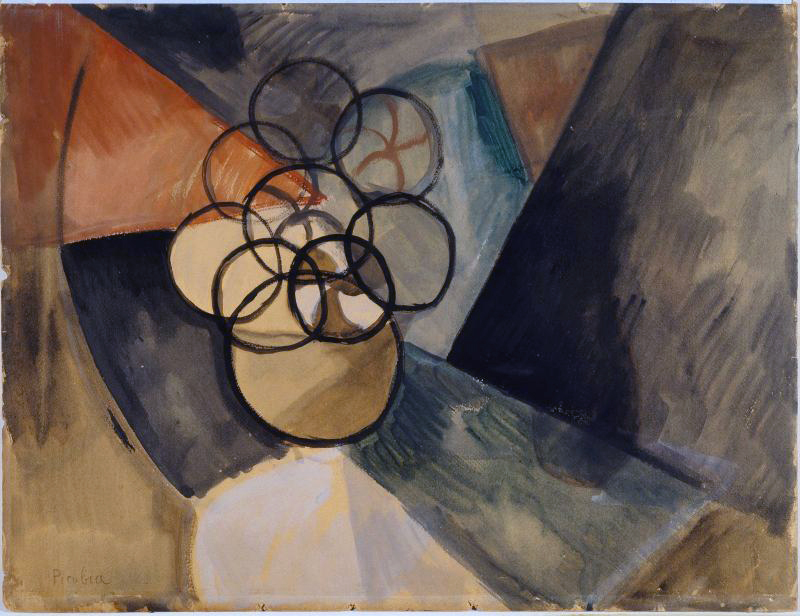
- Artist: Francis Picabia
- Year: c. 1909
- Medium: Watercolor, gouache and India ink on cardboard
- Dimensions: 45.7 cm × 61.5 cm (18 in × 24.2 in)
- Location: Musée National d'Art Moderne; Paris

Caoutchouc (English: Rubber) is a painting created circa 1909 by the French artist Francis Picabia. At the crossroads of Cubism and Fauvism, Caoutchouc is considered one of the first abstract works in Western painting. The painting is in the collection of Centre Pompidou, Musée National d'Art Moderne, in Paris.

== Background ==
Caoutchouc is a watercolor, gouache, and India ink on cardboard with dimensions 45.7 × 61.5 cm (18 by 24.2 inches). The work is signed Picabia lower left, but is undated. For this, much speculation remains about its actual date. Art historian Virginia Spate writes: "Caoutchouc is so different from Picabia's other works of this period that on merely stylistic grounds I would date it to 1913 [...]" However, the Centre Pompidou, Musée national d'art moderne dates the painting circa 1909.

Speculation remains, too, about its degree of abstraction. Critics have claimed that imagery is present in the form of circular structures clustered on the left of the painting, much as fruits are clustered in a still life painting. Two other still lifes from the period indeed represent fruits in a bowl, one of which was claimed by Picabia's wife, Gabrièle Buffet-Picabia, to be closely related to Caoutchouc compositionally. The historian W. Scott Haine wrote that Caoutchouc was "the first clear artistic expression of abstractionism" that would subsequently be expounded upon by Robert Delaunay, Sonia Delaunay, František Kupka and Auguste Herbin.

== Abstract art ==
From 1909 to 1913 several experimental works in the search for purely non-representational art had been created by a number of artists. In addition to Picabia's Caoutchouc, early abstractions included, Wassily Kandinsky's Untitled (First Abstract Watercolor), 1913, Improvisation 21A, the Impression series, and Picture with a Circle (1911); František Kupka's Orphist works, Discs of Newton (Study for Fugue in Two Colors), 1912 and Amorpha, Fugue en deux couleurs (Fugue in Two Colors), 1912; Robert Delaunay's series entitled Simultaneous Windows and Formes Circulaires, Soleil n°2 (1912–13); Léopold Survage's Colored Rhythm (Study for the film), 1913; Piet Mondrian's Tableau No. 1 and Composition No. 11, 1913; and Kasimir Malevich completed his first entirely abstract work, the Suprematist composition entitled Black Square, in 1915.

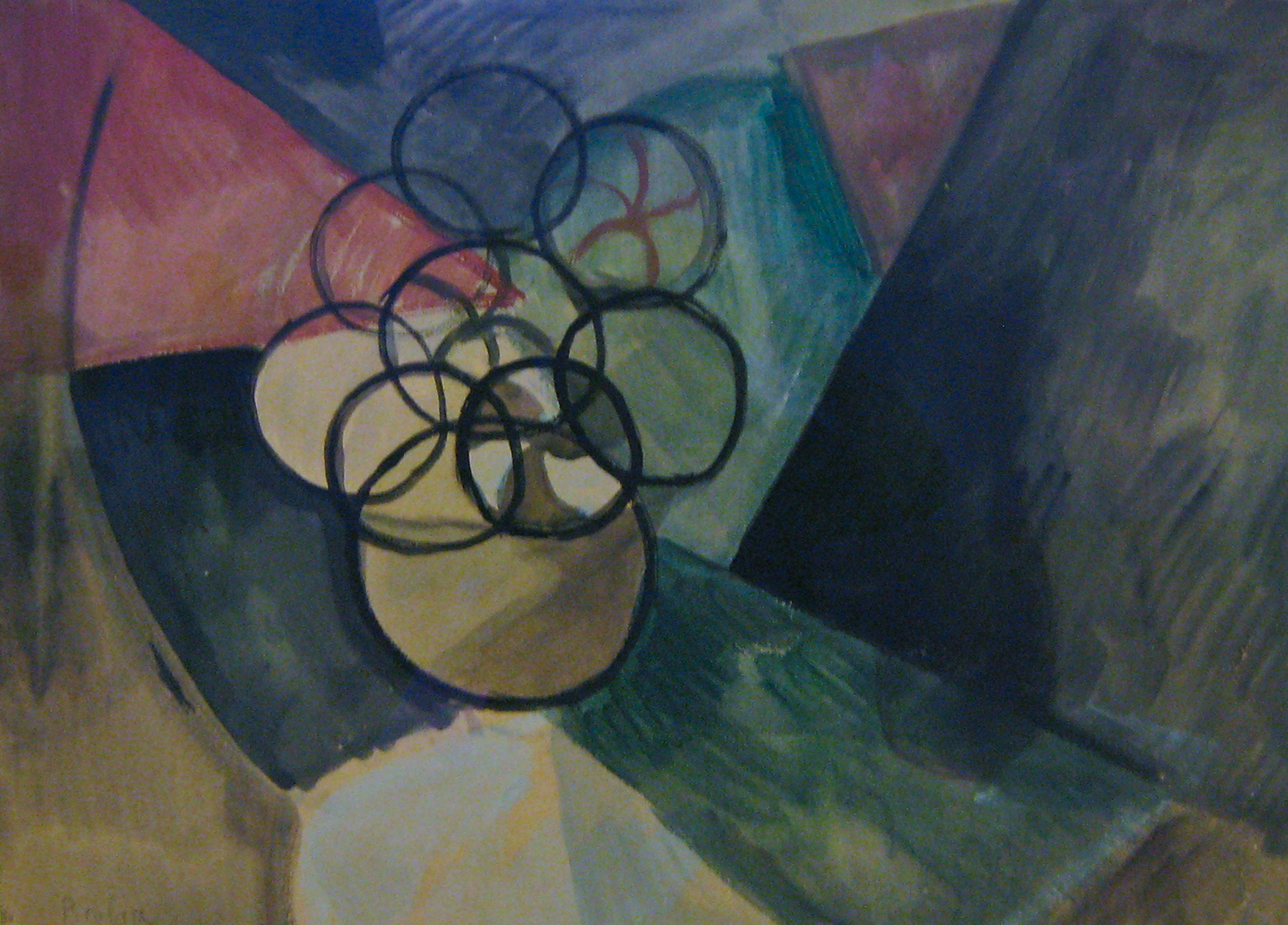
Alternative image of Caoutchouc

The title "Caoutchouc" was derived from a book by Raymond Roussel, Impressions d'Afrique (1909). It was chosen by Picabia several years after the painting was executed. During the months of May or June 1912, Picabia—along with Marcel Duchamp and Guillaume Apollinaire—went to see the stage version of Roussel's Impressions d'Afrique in Paris at the Théâtre Antoine. In both the novel and the play, an ancestral African emperor had planted a rubber tree and a palm for his twin sons. The first tree to bloom would determine which of his sons would become the heir to his throne. The palm bloomed first and one of the sons became king, setting off a feud that resulted in the death of the newly crowned king, whose decaying body was displayed resting against the aged rubber tree (caoutchouc caduc); the rubber tree itself became the symbol for the end of a branch of family lineage.

It has been argued by Belton that Caoutchouc—rather than representing the beginning of a period of abstraction in the oeuvre of Picabia—represented the end of a branch of figurative pictorial lineage, the end of a series of experimental paintings that approached total abstraction without ever attaining it. Though the artist painted several works between 1909 and 1912 that were clearly figurative, they were superseded by non-objective works at a time when Picabia gave his painting the title Caoutchouc.

Art historian and critic Bernard Dorival has vehemently argued in favor of the abstract nature of Caoutchouc, while Gabrièle Buffet-Picabia referred to it as a still life, and the artist Philip Pearlstein, who wrote his thesis on Picabia, described the subject of the painting as a bouncing rubber ball.

Whether a purely abstract work or a still life, the composition itself is highly abstracted in style, not dissimilar to Picabia's proto-Cubist landscapes of 1908 through 1910. Whatever the artists intention, he did not pursue pure abstraction following Caoutchouc until 1912 (with paintings such as La Source (The Spring)).

== See also ==
- List of works by Francis Picabia
- Orphism (art)
