= Arthur Cravan =

French poet, Dadaist and boxer

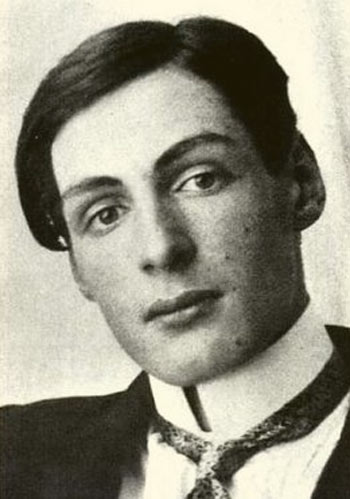
- Born: 22 May 1887; Lausanne, Switzerland
- Died: circa November 1918 (aged 31) (presumed); Salina Cruz, Mexico
- Occupations: Writer, poet, artist and boxer
- Height: 6 ft 7 in (201 cm)

Arthur Cravan (born Fabian Avenarius Lloyd; 22 May 1887 – disappeared 1918) was an English writer, poet, artist and boxer. He was the second son of Otho Holland Lloyd and Hélène Clara St. Clair. His brother Otho Lloyd was a painter and photographer married to the Russian émigré artist Olga Sacharoff. His father's sister, Constance Mary Lloyd, was married to Irish poet Oscar Wilde. He changed his name to Cravan in 1912 in honour of his fiancée Renée Bouchet, who was born in the small village of Cravans in the department of Charente-Maritime in western France.

Cravan was last seen at Salina Cruz, Mexico in 1918 and most likely drowned in the Pacific Ocean off the coast of Mexico in November 1918.

== Early life ==
Cravan was born and educated in Lausanne, Switzerland, then at an English military academy; he was expelled under mysterious circumstances, but some sources suggest that it was for spanking a teacher. After his schooling, during World War I, he travelled throughout Europe and America using a variety of passports and documents, most of them forged. He declared no single nationality and claimed instead to be "a citizen of 20 countries".

== Career ==
Cravan set out to promote himself as an eccentric poet and art critic, but his interest in art and literature was that of the provocateur which is typified by his claim in Maintenant (March – April 1914) that art is "situated more in the guts than in the brain" and that he wanted to "break the face" of the modern art movement. He staged public spectacles with himself at the centre, once acting on the front of a line of carts where he paraded his skills as a boxer and singer. His proclivity for shock was what endeared him to the New York Dadaist movement, who adopted him as a poster boy after his death despite the fact Cravan never self-identified with the movement.

From 1911 to 1915, Cravan published and edited a critical literary magazine, Maintenant! ("Now!"), which appeared in five issues and which he notoriously distributed around Paris with a wheelbarrow. It was gathered together and reprinted by Eric Losfeld in 1971 as J'étais Cigare in the Dadaist collection "Le Désordre". The magazine was designed to cause sensation; in a piece about the 1914 arts salon, Cravan viciously criticised a self-portrait by Marie Laurencin, stating that it looked like she "needed a good shag". His remarks drove Laurencin's lover and influential modernist critic and poet Guillaume Apollinaire into a fury that resulted in a bid for a duel. It is not known whether the duel ever happened, though Apollinaire was depicted more than once with a sling on his arm around that time. Cravan's rough vibrant poetry and provocative, anarchistic lectures and public appearances (often degenerating into drunken brawls) earned him the admiration of Marcel Duchamp, Francis Picabia, André Breton, and other young artists and intellectuals.

Carolyn Burke notes that Amelia von Ende, writing in The Dial in 1914, argued that Cravan "had not only put the idea of pluralisme into poetic form but also invented the term 'machinisme', which very appropriately characterises the mechanical and industrial side of our life. [...] [von Ende] observed that Cravan's 'machinisme' had not found favour because it was less euphonious than 'dynamism', the critical term in vogue."

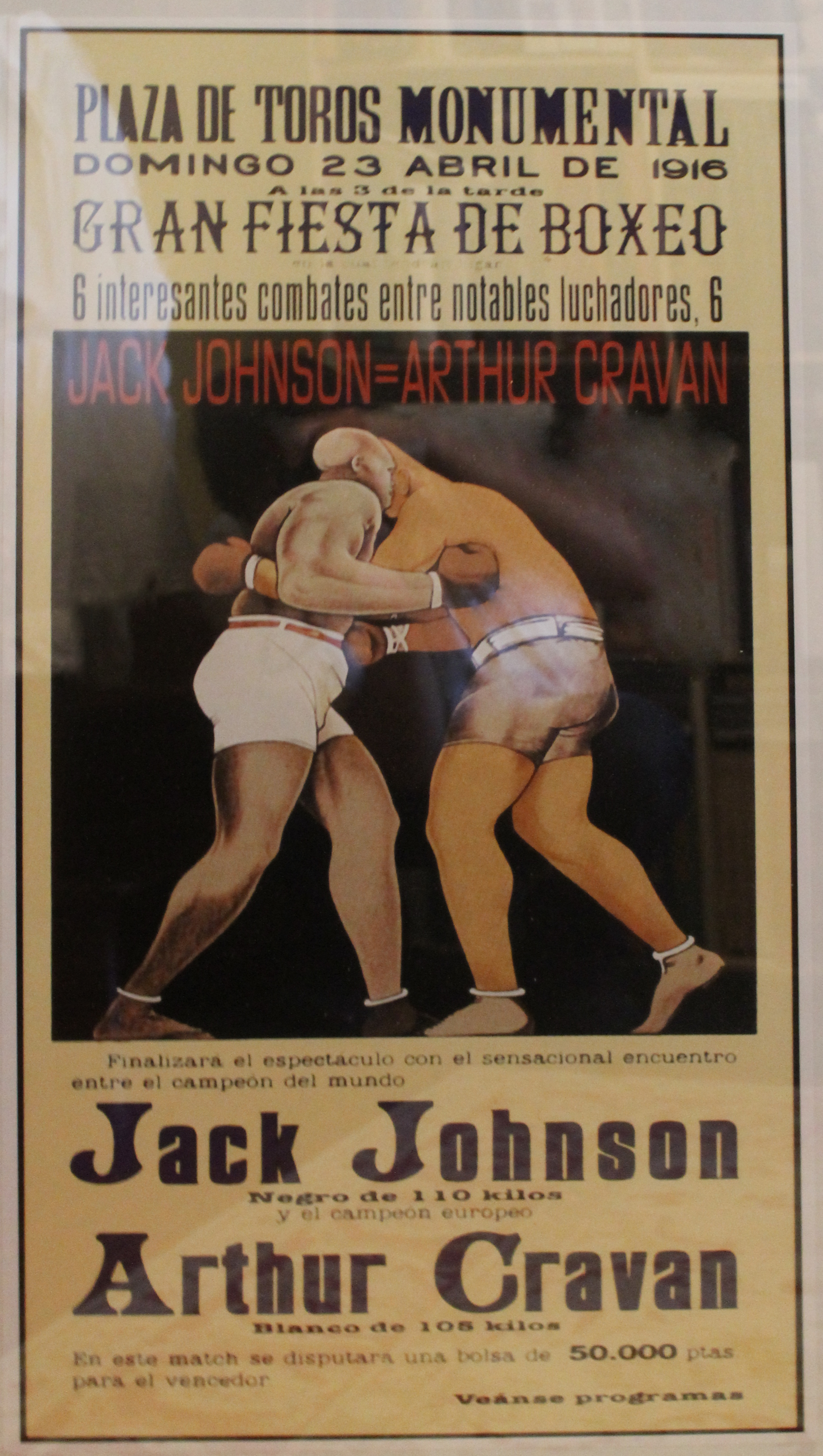
Arthur Cravan and Jack Johnson poster, 1916

After the First World War began, Cravan left Paris to avoid being drafted into military service. On a stopover in the Canary Islands a boxing match was arranged in Barcelona between Cravan and the former world champion Jack Johnson to raise money for Cravan's passage to the United States. Posters for the match touted Cravan as "European champion". Johnson, who didn't know who the man was, knocked Cravan out cold after six rounds. In his autobiography, My Life and Battles, Johnson noted that Cravan must have been out of training.

Cravan's pride in being the nephew of Oscar Wilde produced hoax documents and poems which Cravan wrote and then signed "Oscar Wilde". In 1913 he published an article ("Oscar Wilde is Alive!") in Maintenant claiming that his uncle was still alive and had visited him in Paris. The New York Times published the rumour, even though Cravan and Wilde never met. In 1915 Cravan held an exhibition of his paintings at the gallery Bernheim Jeune in Paris under the pseudonym Èdouard Archinard.

== New York (1916–17) ==
On 13 January 1916 Cravan arrived in New York on the same ship as Leon Trotsky, Carolyn Burke notes, "just a few weeks before the Kaiser announced the resumption of attacks on steamships". On the journey Trotsky and Cravan actually became acquainted and, although Cravan reportedly liked Trotsky, he felt that "It was useless telling him the result of his revolution would be the founding of a red army to protect the red liberty". While Cravan's practices may have aligned with certain anarchist and socialist principles, he was staunchly unaffiliated, mocked all notions of progress and subscribed to no single ideology or movement.

In 1917, Cravan met the poet Mina Loy at a war benefit ball where the dress code was modern art movements. That night Cravan had to deliver an address on "The Independent Artists of France and America" but he was pranked by Picabia and Duchamp who got him so drunk that he ended up swaying and slurring his speech on the platform, shouting obscenities and removing his coat, vest, collar and suspenders. This led to his arrest by four private detectives at the event but, after being taken to the local police station, Cravan was soon bailed out by friend Walter Conrad Arensberg who took him back to his home at West Sixty-Seventh Street.

Loy was to describe him, for the rest of her life, as the love of her life.

== Mexico ==
Cravan left New York for Mexico on 1 September with a friend called Frost. Around this time in his letters to Loy, who remained in New York, he wrote that "I am only at my best when travelling" and that "[w]hen I have to stay too long in the same place, I become almost imbecilic." Together Cravan and Frost hitchhiked north through Connecticut, Massachusetts, and Maine to Canada. After many failed attempts to sail from Nova Scotia to Newfoundland due to the Canadian authorities refusing their lack of papers, Frost became ill and Cravan boarded a schooner bound for Mexico alone.

By December, Cravan had reached Mexico City and sent Loy a multitude of letters pleading with her to join him, insisting that his life depended upon it. In one such letter he begged for a lock of her hair and begged, "Better yet, come with all of your hair." He finished this letter with: "La vie est atroce." Soon after this Loy purchased a one-way ticket to Mexico City involving a 5-day train journey.

Loy, in one of the extracts from her autobiography Colossus (the title taking after her name for Cravan), recalls their time in Mexico City:

"Our life together consisted entirely in wandering arm in arm through the streets. It never made any difference what we were doing – making love or respectfully eyeing canned foods in groceries, eating our tamales at street corners or walking among weeds. Somehow we had tapped the source of enchantment."

Not too long after Loy's arrival the pair decided to get married and, as they were unable to afford a luxurious wedding in a Mexican chapel, the pair married on 25 January 1918 at the mayor's office with two passersby as witnesses.

The couple lived on very humble means and Cravan eventually got seriously ill with amoebic dysentery, fever, stomach issues. During this time there was increasing pressure for the couple to leave Mexico City as Cravan, being a draft-dodger, was being pursued by American law enforcement. After Loy nursed him back to health, the couple decided to leave Mexico City separately – Loy leaving first, in order to research escape routes to Argentina, and Cravan remaining in order to raise some money. In his desperation Cravan took up a fight against Jim Smith in which he was humiliatingly beaten.

After reuniting it was clear that Loy was pregnant. With very little money, and Cravan's passport documents still not in order, it was agreed that Loy would travel on a passenger ship to protect her health and Cravan, as well as his friends Winchester, Cattell, and their Swedish friend (none of whom had the necessary papers) would sail to Chile. After purchasing and repairing an old and small craft cheaply in Salina Cruz, Cravan sailed alone to Puerto Angel, a few days up the coast, with the intention of selling or trading it for a larger vessel which he would then return to Salina Cruz in so as to accommodate all his friends in their journey to Chile.

Cravan never arrived or returned and it is presumed that he capsized and drowned in a storm raging at sea in the following days.

Loy gave birth to Fabienne Cravan Lloyd, named after her father, on 5 April 1919 in London.

== Professional boxing record ==
3 fights	0 wins	3 losses
By knockout	0	3

No.	Result	Record	Opponent	Type	Round	Date	Location	Notes
3	Loss	0–3	Jim Smith	KO	2 (20)	Sep 15, 1918	Plaza de Toros, Mexico City, Mexico	For vacant Mexico heavyweight title
2	Loss	0–2	Frank Hoche	TKO	1 (?)	Jun 26, 1916	Frontón Condal, Barcelona, Spain	
1	Loss	0–1	Jack Johnson	KO	6 (20)	Apr 23, 1916	Plaza de Toros Monumental, Barcelona, Spain	

== In popular culture ==
In the Bob Brown novel You Gotta Live (1932) the character Rex is modelled on Cravan and Rita on Loy.

Mentioned in Ted Berrigan and Ron Padgett's poem entitled "Bean Spasms", published in 1967 within their book, Bean Spasms.

"Song Without Any End", a track on Brian Ritchie's album I See a Noise (1990), features Arthur Cravan as its subject.

Shadow-Box (1999), a novel by Irish author Antonia Logue, is a fictional version of the interweaving of the lives of Cravan, Mina Loy and Jack Johnson, the first black heavyweight champion of the world.

Cravan vs. Cravan (2002), a documentary film by Catalan Spanish director Isaki Lacuesta, traces Cravan's history through re-enactments featuring French boxer and filmmaker Frank Nicotra.

Cravan (2005), a biographical graphic novel on the life of Arthur Cravan, was written by Mike Richardson and illustrated by Rick Geary. Published by Dark Horse Comics, this biography puts forth the idea that Arthur Cravan and novelist B. Traven might be one and the same.

Last Stop Salina Cruz (2007), a novel by British author David Lalé, tells the story of a young man following in the footsteps of Cravan across France, Spain, USA, Mexico and finally Salina Cruz.

Tonight Sandy Grierson Will Lecture Dance and Box was a 2011 theatre show at the Edinburgh Fringe, co-created by the actor Sandy Grierson, who played Cravan, and the director Lorne Campbell.

The Arthur Cravan Memorial Society was a 2013 BBC Radio 4 portrait of Cravan by the comedian Arthur Smith.

The Escape Artist, a 10-part documentary on the poet-boxer Arthur Cravan by Ross Sutherland, was broadcast on BBC Radio 3 in January 2020.

== See also ==
- List of people who disappeared mysteriously at sea
