= Abstract art =

Art with a degree of independence from visual references

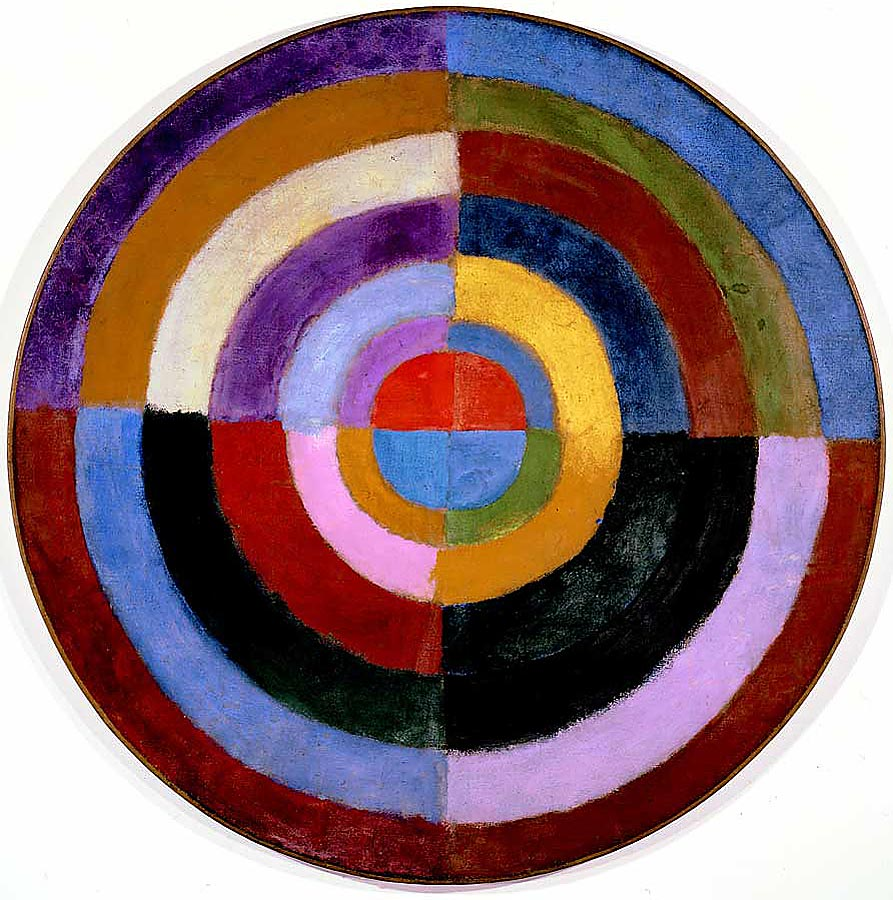
Robert Delaunay, 1912–13, Le Premier Disque, 134 cm (52.7 in.), private collection

Abstract art uses visual language of shape, form, color, and line to create a composition which may exist with a degree of independence from visual references in the world. Abstract art, non-figurative art, non-objective art, and non-representational art are all closely related terms. They have similar, but perhaps not identical, meanings.

Western art had been, from the Renaissance up to the middle of the 19th century, underpinned by the logic of perspective and an attempt to reproduce an illusion of visible reality. By the end of the 19th century, many artists felt a need to create a new kind of art that would encompass the fundamental changes taking place in technology, science, and philosophy. The sources from which individual artists drew their theoretical arguments were diverse and reflected the social and intellectual preoccupations in all areas of Western culture at that time.

Abstraction indicates a departure from reality in depiction of imagery in art. This departure from accurate representation can be slight, partial, or complete. Abstraction exists along a continuum. Artwork which takes liberties, e.g. altering color or form in ways that are conspicuous, can be said to be partially abstract. Total abstraction bears no trace of any reference to anything recognizable. In geometric abstraction, for instance, one is unlikely to find references to naturalistic entities. Figurative art and total abstraction are almost mutually exclusive. But figurative and representational (or realistic) art often contain partial abstraction.

Both geometric abstraction and lyrical abstraction are often totally abstract. Among the very numerous art movements that embody partial abstraction would be for instance fauvism in which color is conspicuously and deliberately altered vis-a-vis reality, and cubism, which alters the forms of the real-life entities depicted.

== History ==
=== 19th century in Europe ===
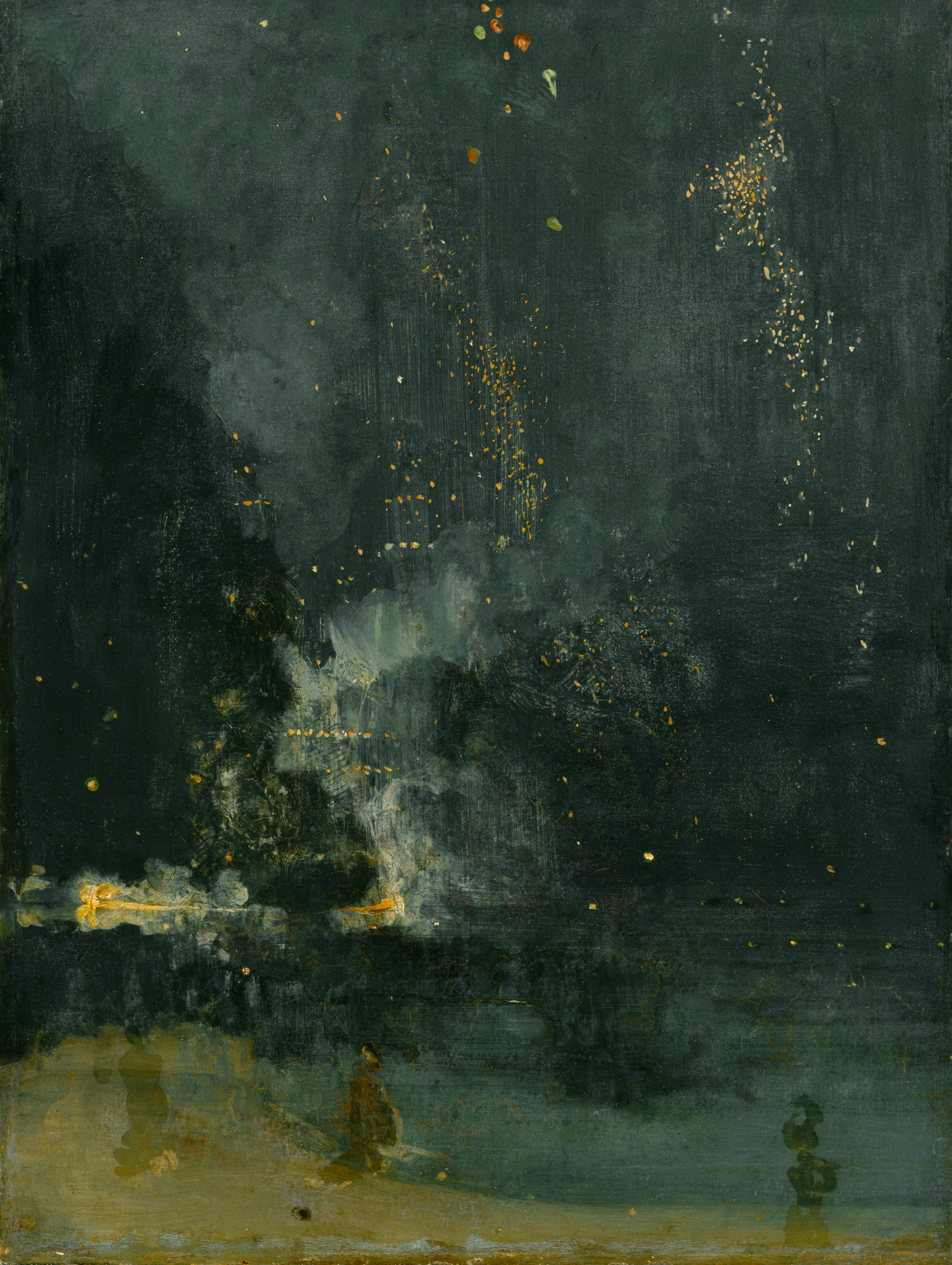
James McNeill Whistler, Nocturne in Black and Gold: The Falling Rocket (1874), Detroit Institute of Arts

In 19th century Europe, patronage from the church diminished and private patronage from the public became more capable of providing a livelihood for artists. Three art movements which contributed to the development of abstract art were Romanticism, Impressionism and Expressionism. Artistic independence for artists was advanced during the 19th century. An objective interest in what is seen can be discerned from the paintings of John Constable, J. M. W. Turner, Camille Corot and from them to the Impressionists who continued the plein air painting of the Barbizon school. Early intimations of a new art had been made by James McNeill Whistler who, in his painting Nocturne in Black and Gold: The Falling Rocket, (1872), placed greater emphasis on visual sensation than the depiction of objects. Even earlier than that, with her "spirit" drawings, Georgiana Houghton's choice to work with abstract shapes correlate with the unnatural nature of her subject, in a time when abstraction was not yet a concept (she organized an exhibit in 1871).

Expressionist painters explored the bold use of paint surface, drawing distortions and exaggerations, and intense color. Expressionists produced emotionally charged paintings that were reactions to and perceptions of contemporary experience; and reactions to Impressionism and other more conservative directions of late 19th-century painting. The Expressionists drastically changed the emphasis on subject matter in favor of the portrayal of psychological states of being. Although artists like Edvard Munch and James Ensor drew influences principally from the work of the Post-Impressionists they were instrumental to the advent of abstraction in the 20th century. Paul Cézanne had begun as an Impressionist but his aim – to make a logical construction of reality based on a view from a single point, with modulated color in flat areas – became the basis of a new visual art, later to be developed into Cubism.

Additionally in the late 19th century in Eastern Europe mysticism and early modernist religious philosophy as expressed by theosophist Mme. Blavatsky had a profound impact on pioneer geometric artists like Hilma af Klint and Wassily Kandinsky. The mystical teaching of Georges Gurdjieff and P.D. Ouspensky also had an important influence on the early formations of the geometric abstract styles of Piet Mondrian and his colleagues in the early 20th century. The spiritualism also inspired the abstract art of Kasimir Malevich and František Kupka.

=== Early 20th century ===
==== Fauvism and Cubism ====
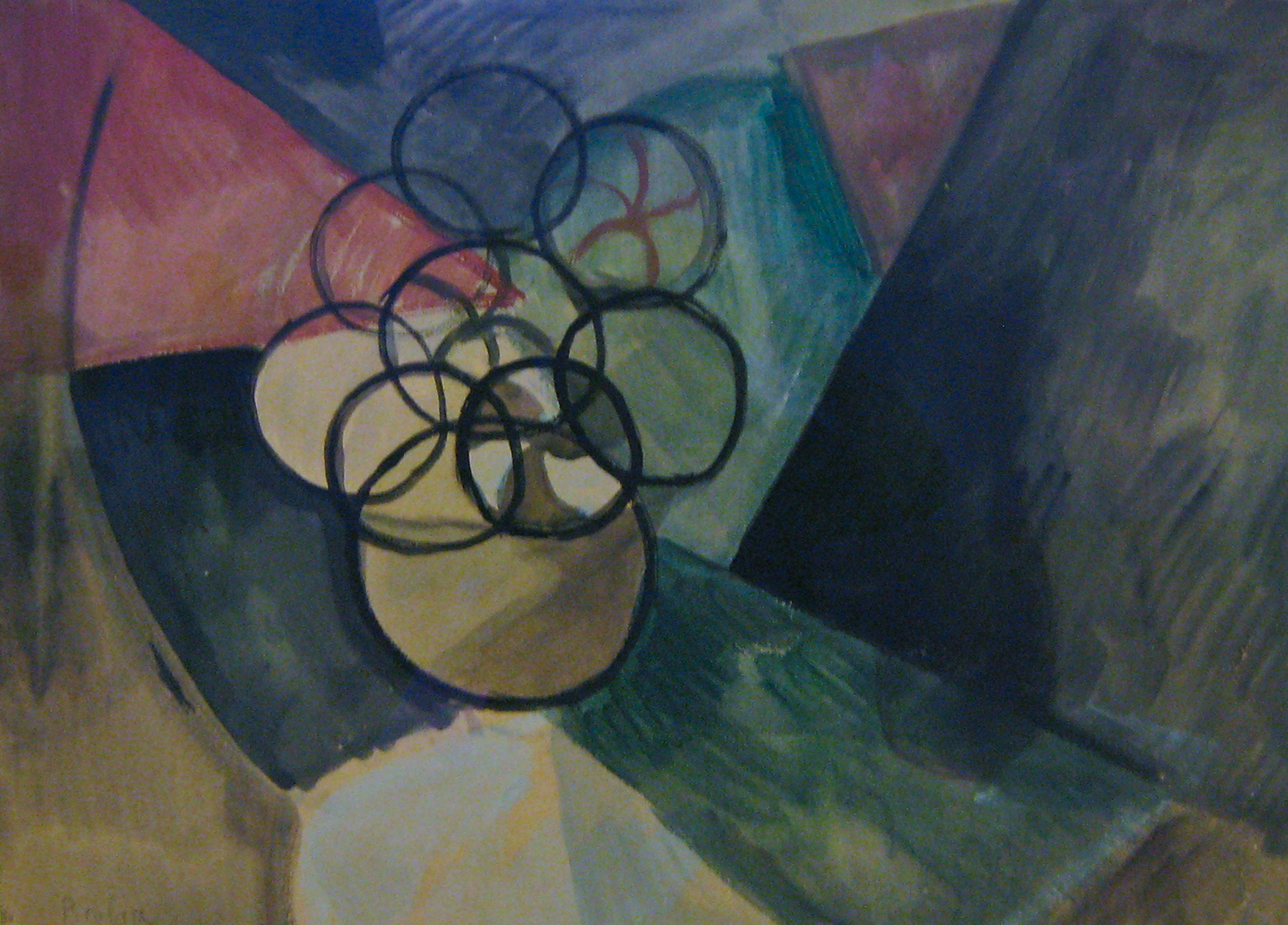
Francis Picabia, c. 1909, Caoutchouc, Centre Pompidou, Musée national d'art moderne, Paris

At the beginning of the 20th century Henri Matisse and several other young artists including the pre-cubist Georges Braque, André Derain, Raoul Dufy and Jean Metzinger revolutionized the Paris art world with "wild", multi-colored, expressive landscapes and figure paintings that the critics called Fauvism. The raw language of color as developed by the Fauves directly influenced another pioneer of abstraction, Wassily Kandinsky.

Cubism, based on Cézanne's idea that all depiction of nature can be reduced to cube, sphere and cone became along with Fauvism (mainly through artists like Pablo Picasso) the art movement that directly opened the door to abstraction in the early 20th century.

==== Early abstract art ====
František Kupka, Amorpha, Fugue en deux couleurs (Fugue in Two Colors), 1912, oil on canvas, 210 × 200 cm, Narodni Galerie, Prague. Published in Au Salon d'Automne "Les Indépendants" 1912, Exhibited at the 1912 Salon d'Automne, Paris.

During the 1912 Salon de la Section d'Or, where František Kupka exhibited his abstract painting Amorpha, Fugue en deux couleurs (Fugue in Two Colors) (1912), the poet Guillaume Apollinaire named the work of several artists including Robert Delaunay, Orphism. He defined it as, "the art of painting new structures out of elements that have not been borrowed from the visual sphere, but had been created entirely by the artist...it is a pure art."

Since the turn of the century, cultural connections between artists of the major European cities had become extremely active as they strove to create an art form equal to the high aspirations of modernism. Ideas were able to cross-fertilize by means of artist's books, exhibitions and manifestos so that many sources were open to experimentation and discussion, and formed a basis for a diversity of modes of abstraction. The following extract from The World Backwards gives some impression of the inter-connectedness of culture at the time: "David Burliuk's knowledge of modern art movements must have been extremely up-to-date, for the second Knave of Diamonds exhibition, held in January 1912 (in Moscow) included not only paintings sent from Munich, but some members of the German Die Brücke group, while from Paris came work by Robert Delaunay, Henri Matisse and Fernand Léger, as well as Picasso. During the Spring David Burliuk gave two lectures on cubism and planned a polemical publication, which the Knave of Diamonds was to finance. He went abroad in May and came back determined to rival the almanac Der Blaue Reiter which had emerged from the printers while he was in Germany".

From 1909 to 1913 many experimental works in the search for this 'pure art' had been created by a number of artists: Francis Picabia painted Caoutchouc, c. 1909, The Spring, 1912, Dances at the Spring and The Procession, Seville, 1912; Wassily Kandinsky painted Untitled (First Abstract Watercolor), 1913, Improvisation 21A, the Impression series, and Picture with a Circle (1911); František Kupka had painted the Orphist works, Discs of Newton (Study for Fugue in Two Colors), 1912 and Amorpha, Fugue en deux couleurs (Fugue in Two Colors), 1912; Robert Delaunay painted a series entitled Simultaneous Windows and Formes Circulaires, Soleil n°2 (1912–13); Léopold Survage created Colored Rhythm (Study for the film), 1913; Piet Mondrian, painted Tableau No. 1 and Composition No. 11, 1913.

With his expressive use of color and imaginative drawing, Henri Matisse comes very close to pure abstraction in French Window at Collioure (1914), View of Notre-Dame (1914), and The Yellow Curtain from 1915.

And the search continued: The Rayist (Luchizm) drawings of Natalia Goncharova and Mikhail Larionov, used lines like rays of light to make a construction. Kasimir Malevich completed his first entirely abstract work, the Suprematist, Black Square, in 1915. Another of the Suprematist group' Liubov Popova, created the Architectonic Constructions and Spatial Force Constructions between 1916 and 1921. Piet Mondrian was evolving his abstract language, of horizontal and vertical lines with rectangles of color, between 1915 and 1919, Neo-Plasticism was the aesthetic which Mondrian, Theo van Doesburg and other in the group De Stijl intended to reshape the environment of the future.

==== Russian avant-garde ====
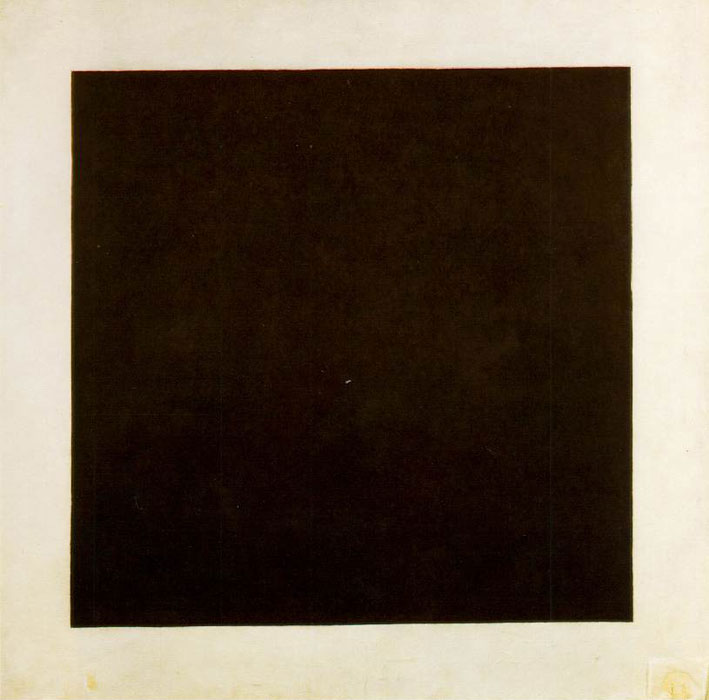
Kazimir Malevich, Black Square, 1923, The Russian Museum

Many of the abstract artists in Russia became Constructivists believing that art was no longer something remote, but life itself. The artist must become a technician, learning to use the tools and materials of modern production. Art into life! was Vladimir Tatlin's slogan, and that of all the future Constructivists. Varvara Stepanova and Alexandre Exter and others abandoned easel painting and diverted their energies to theatre design and graphic works. On the other side stood Kazimir Malevich, Anton Pevsner and Naum Gabo. They argued that art was essentially a spiritual activity; to create the individual's place in the world, not to organize life in a practical, materialistic sense. During that time, representatives of the Russian avant-garde collaborated with other Eastern European Constructivist artists, including Władysław Strzemiński, Katarzyna Kobro, and Henryk Stażewski.

Many of those who were hostile to the materialist production idea of art left Russia. Anton Pevsner went to France, Gabo went first to Berlin, then to England and finally to America. Kandinsky studied in Moscow then left for the Bauhaus. By the mid-1920s the revolutionary period (1917 to 1921) when artists had been free to experiment was over; and by the 1930s only socialist realism was allowed.

==== Music ====
As visual art becomes more abstract, it develops some characteristics of music: an art form which uses the abstract elements of sound and divisions of time. Wassily Kandinsky, himself an amateur musician, was inspired by the possibility of marks and associative color resounding in the soul. The idea had been put forward by Charles Baudelaire, that all our senses respond to various stimuli but the senses are connected at a deeper aesthetic level.

Closely related to this, is the idea that art has The spiritual dimension and can transcend 'every-day' experience, reaching a spiritual plane. The Theosophical Society popularized the ancient wisdom of the sacred books of India and China in the early years of the century. It was in this context that Piet Mondrian, Wassily Kandinsky, Hilma af Klint and other artists working towards an 'objectless state' became interested in the occult as a way of creating an 'inner' object. The universal and timeless shapes found in geometry: the circle, square and triangle become the spatial elements in abstract art; they are, like color, fundamental systems underlying visible reality.

==== The Bauhaus ====
The Bauhaus at Weimar, Germany was founded in 1919 by Walter Gropius. The philosophy underlying the teaching program was unity of all the visual and plastic arts from architecture and painting to weaving and stained glass. This philosophy had grown from the ideas of the Arts and Crafts movement in England and the Deutscher Werkbund. Among the teachers were Paul Klee, Wassily Kandinsky, Johannes Itten, Josef Albers, Anni Albers, and László Moholy-Nagy. In 1925 the school was moved to Dessau and, as the Nazi party gained control in 1932, The Bauhaus was closed. In 1937 an exhibition of degenerate art, 'Entartete Kunst' contained all types of avant-garde art disapproved of by the Nazi party. Then the exodus began: not just from the Bauhaus but from Europe in general; to Paris, London and America. Paul Klee went to Switzerland but many of the artists at the Bauhaus went to America.

==== Abstraction in Paris and London ====
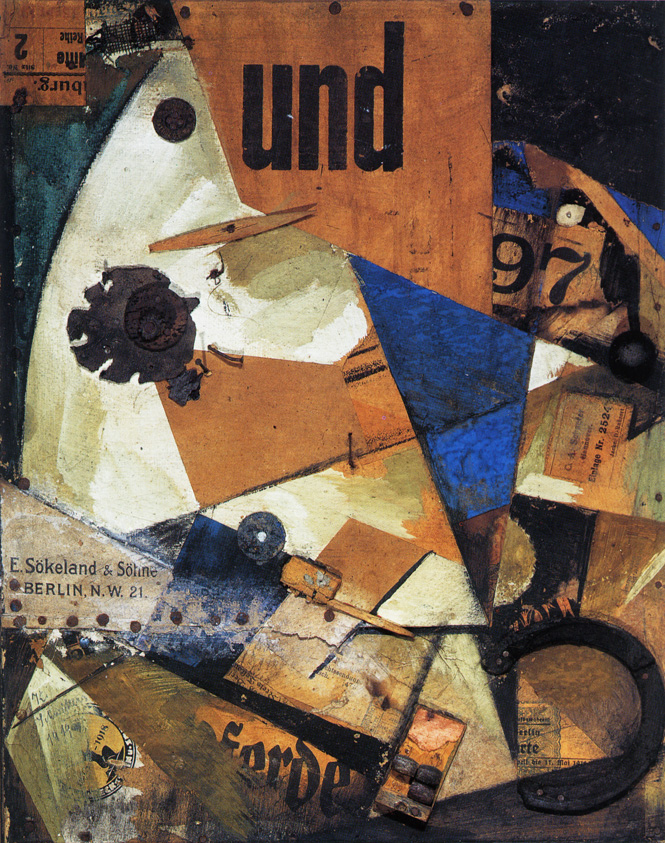
Kurt Schwitters, Das Undbild, 1919, Staatsgalerie Stuttgart

During the 1930s Paris became the host to artists from Russia, Germany, the Netherlands and other European countries affected by the rise of totalitarianism. Sophie Tauber and Jean Arp collaborated on paintings and sculpture using organic/geometric forms. The Polish Katarzyna Kobro applied mathematically based ideas to sculpture. The many types of abstraction now in close proximity led to attempts by artists to analyse the various conceptual and aesthetic groupings. An exhibition by forty-six members of the Cercle et Carré group organized by Joaquín Torres-García assisted by Michel Seuphor contained work by the Neo-Plasticists as well as abstractionists as varied as Kandinsky, Anton Pevsner and Kurt Schwitters. Criticized by Theo van Doesburg to be too indefinite a collection he published the journal Art Concret setting out a manifesto defining an abstract art in which the line, color and surface only are the concrete reality. Abstraction-Création founded in 1931 as a more open group, provided a point of reference for abstract artists, as the political situation worsened in 1935, and artists again regrouped, many in London. The first exhibition of British abstract art was held in England in 1935. The following year the more international Abstract and Concrete exhibition was organized by Nicolete Gray including work by Piet Mondrian, Joan Miró, Barbara Hepworth and Ben Nicholson. Hepworth, Nicholson and Gabo moved to the St. Ives in Cornwall to continue their constructivist work.

=== Late 20th century ===
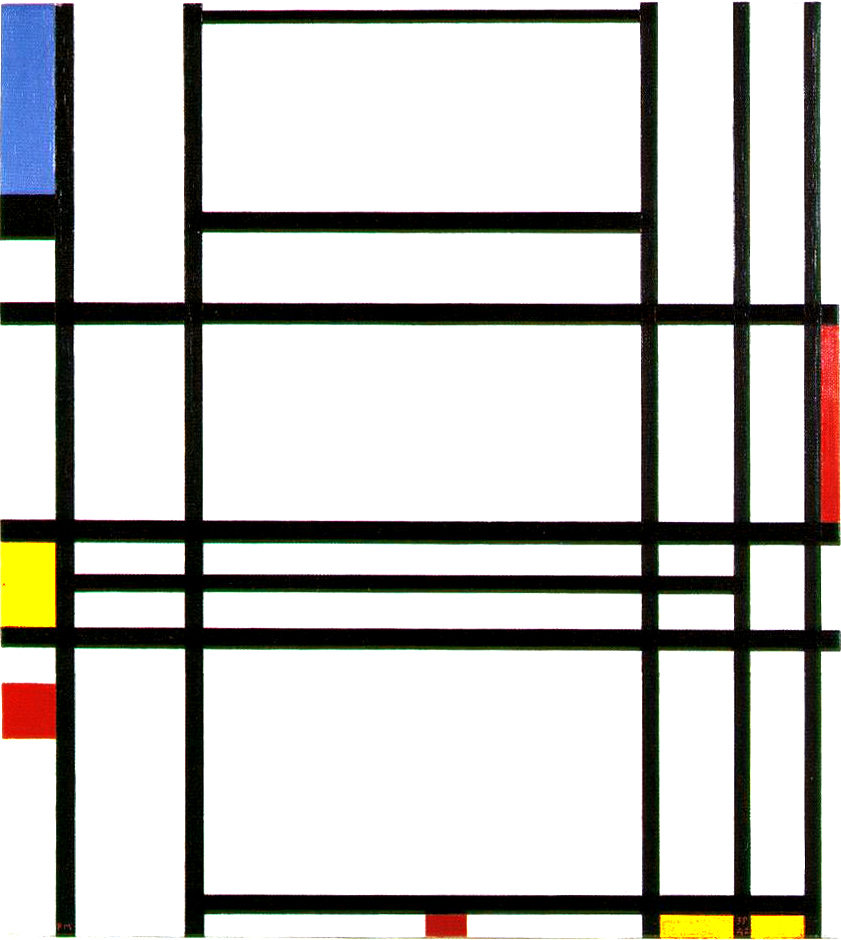
A 1939–1942 oil on canvas painting by Piet Mondrian titled Composition No. 10. Responding to it, fellow De Stijl artist Theo van Doesburg suggested a link between non-representational works of art and ideals of peace and spirituality.

During the Nazi rise to power in the 1930s many artists fled Europe to the United States. By the early 1940s the main movements in modern art, expressionism, cubism, abstraction, surrealism, and dada were represented in New York: Marcel Duchamp, Fernand Léger, Piet Mondrian, Jacques Lipchitz, André Masson, Max Ernst, and André Breton, were just a few of the exiled Europeans who arrived in New York. The rich cultural influences brought by the European artists were distilled and built upon by local New York painters. The climate of freedom in New York allowed all of these influences to flourish. The art galleries that primarily had focused on European art began to notice the local art community and the work of younger American artists who had begun to mature. Certain artists at this time became distinctly abstract in their mature work. During this period Piet Mondrian's painting Composition No. 10, 1939–1942, characterized by primary colors, white ground and black grid lines clearly defined his radical but classical approach to the rectangle and abstract art in general. Some artists of the period defied categorization, such as Georgia O'Keeffe who, while a modernist abstractionist, was a pure maverick in that she painted highly abstract forms while not joining any specific group of the period.

Eventually American artists who were working in a great diversity of styles began to coalesce into cohesive stylistic groups. The best-known group of American artists became known as the Abstract expressionists and the New York School. In New York City there was an atmosphere which encouraged discussion and there was a new opportunity for learning and growing. Artists and teachers John D. Graham and Hans Hofmann became important bridge figures between the newly arrived European Modernists and the younger American artists coming of age. Mark Rothko, born in Russia, began with strongly surrealist imagery which later dissolved into his powerful color compositions of the early 1950s. The expressionistic gesture and the act of painting itself, became of primary importance to Jackson Pollock, Robert Motherwell, and Franz Kline. Paul Hultberg utilized this same action painting style, combined with both painterly and print making techniques with his innovative large scale expressionist abstract murals in vitreous enamel on copper. While during the 1940s Arshile Gorky's and Willem de Kooning's figurative work evolved into abstraction by the end of the decade. New York City became the center, and artists worldwide gravitated towards it; from other places in America as well.

=== 21st century ===
Digital art, hard-edge painting, geometric abstraction, minimalism, lyrical abstraction, op art, abstract expressionism, color field painting, monochrome painting, assemblage, neo-Dada, shaped canvas painting, are a few directions relating to abstraction in the second half of the 20th century.

In the United States, Art as Object as seen in the Minimalist sculpture of Donald Judd and the paintings of Frank Stella are seen today as newer permutations. Other examples include Lyrical Abstraction and the sensuous use of color seen in the work of painters as diverse as Robert Motherwell, Patrick Heron, Kenneth Noland, Sam Francis, Cy Twombly, Richard Diebenkorn, Helen Frankenthaler, Joan Mitchell, and Veronica Ruiz de Velasco.

== Analysis ==
One socio-historical explanation that has been offered for the growing prevalence of the abstract in modern art—an explanation linked to the name of Theodor W. Adorno—is that such abstraction is a response to (and a reflection of) the growing abstraction of social relations in industrial society.

Frederic Jameson similarly sees modernist abstraction as a function of the abstract power of money, equating all things equally as exchange-values. The social content of abstract art is then precisely the abstract nature of social existence—legal formalities, bureaucratic impersonalization, information/power—in the world of late modernity.

By contrast, Post-Jungians would see the quantum theories with their disintegration of conventional ideas of form and matter as underlying the divorce of the concrete and the abstract in modern art.

== Gallery ==
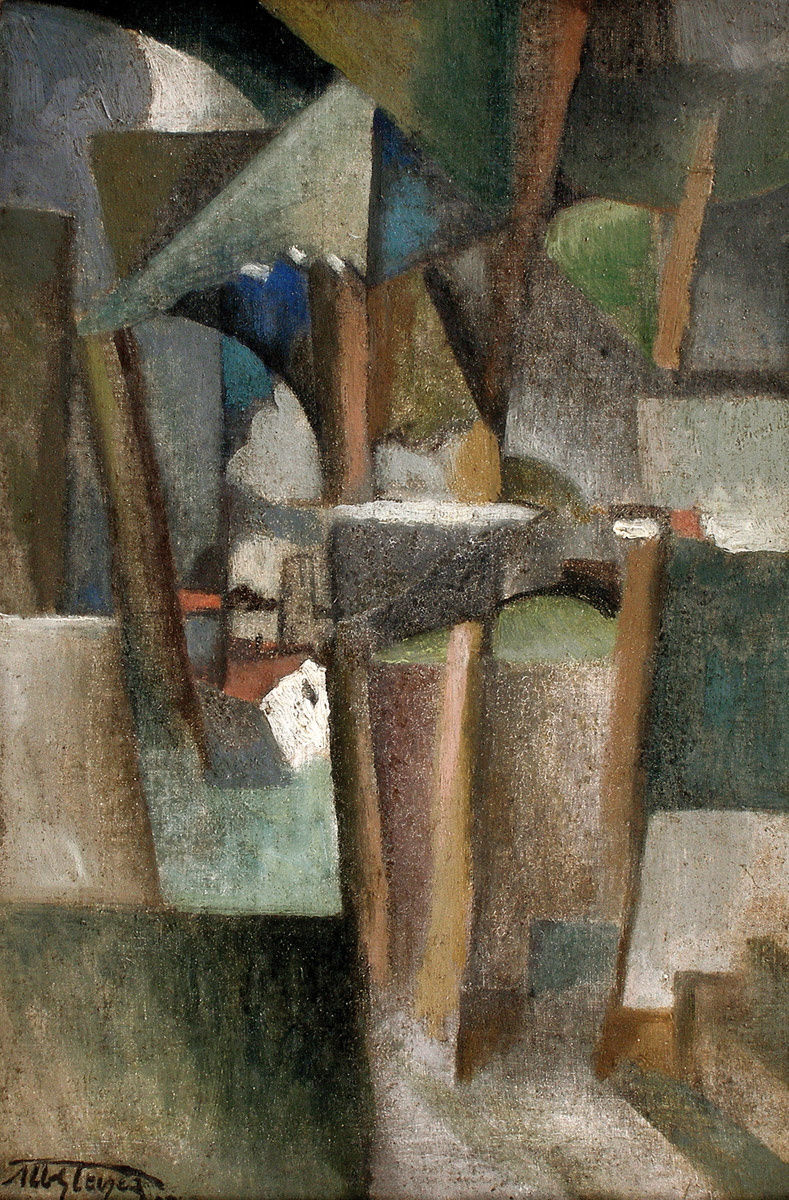
Albert Gleizes, Les Arbres (The Trees), 1910–12, oil on canvas, 41 × 27 cm. Reproduced in Du "Cubisme", 1912

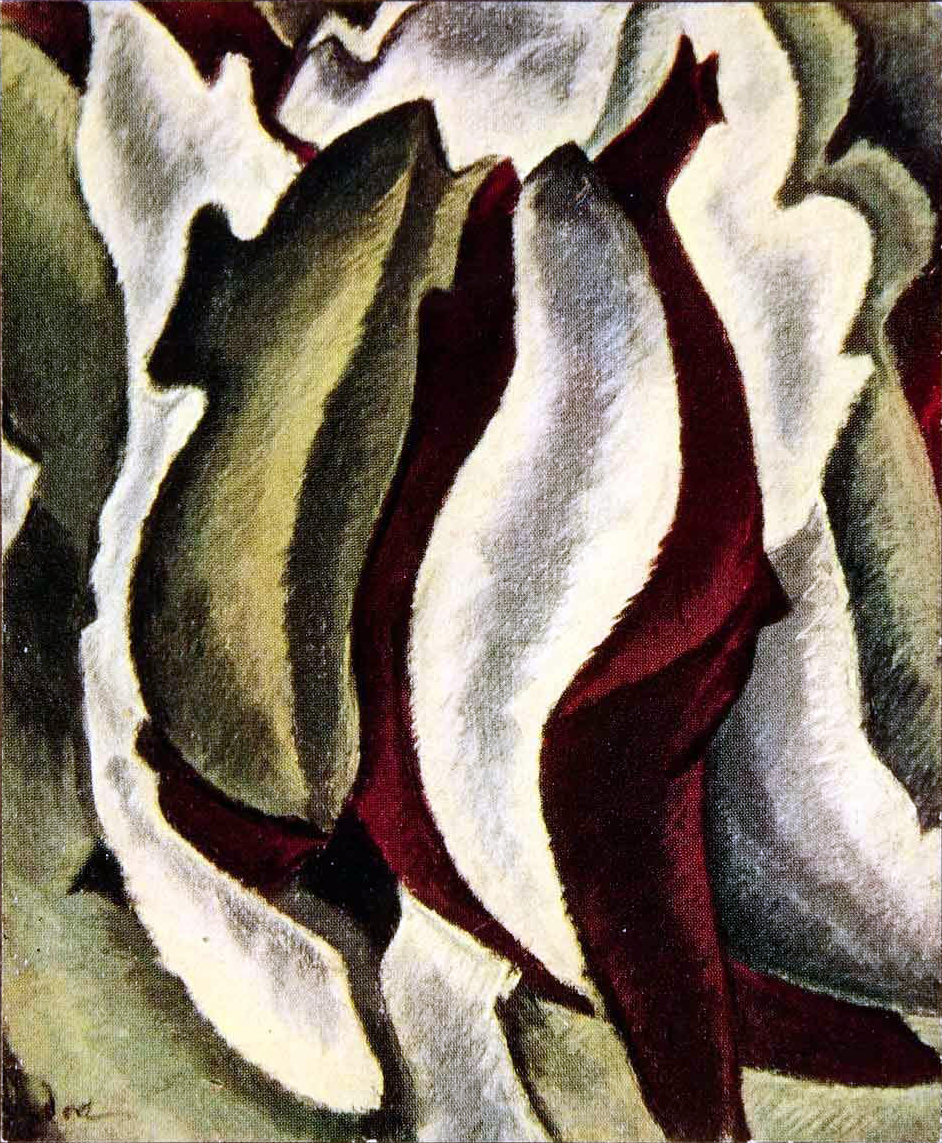
Arthur Dove, Based on Leaf Forms and Spaces, 1911–12, pastel on unidentified support (now lost)

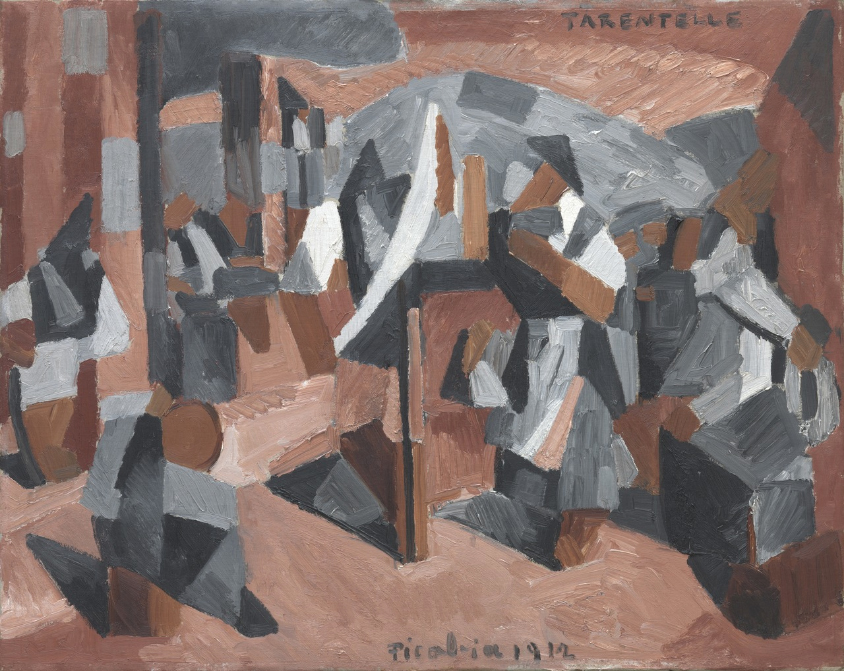
Francis Picabia, Tarentelle, 1912, oil on canvas, 73.6 × 92.1 cm, The Museum of Modern Art, New York. Reproduced in Du "Cubisme"

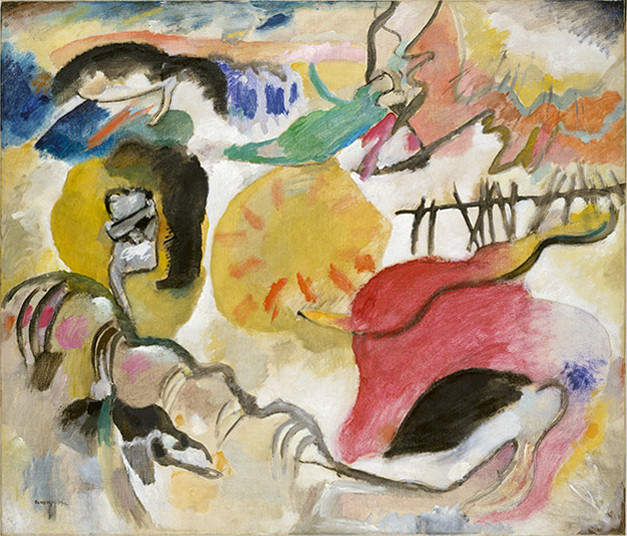
Wassily Kandinsky, Improvisation 27 (Garden of Love II), 1912, oil on canvas, 120.3 × 140.3 cm, The Metropolitan Museum of Art, New York. Exhibited at the 1913 Armory Show

Pablo Picasso, Head (Tête), 1913–14, cut and pasted colored paper, gouache and charcoal on paperboard, 43.5 × 33 cm, Scottish National Gallery of Modern Art, Edinburgh

Henri Matisse, French Window at Collioure, 1914, Centre Georges Pompidou, Paris

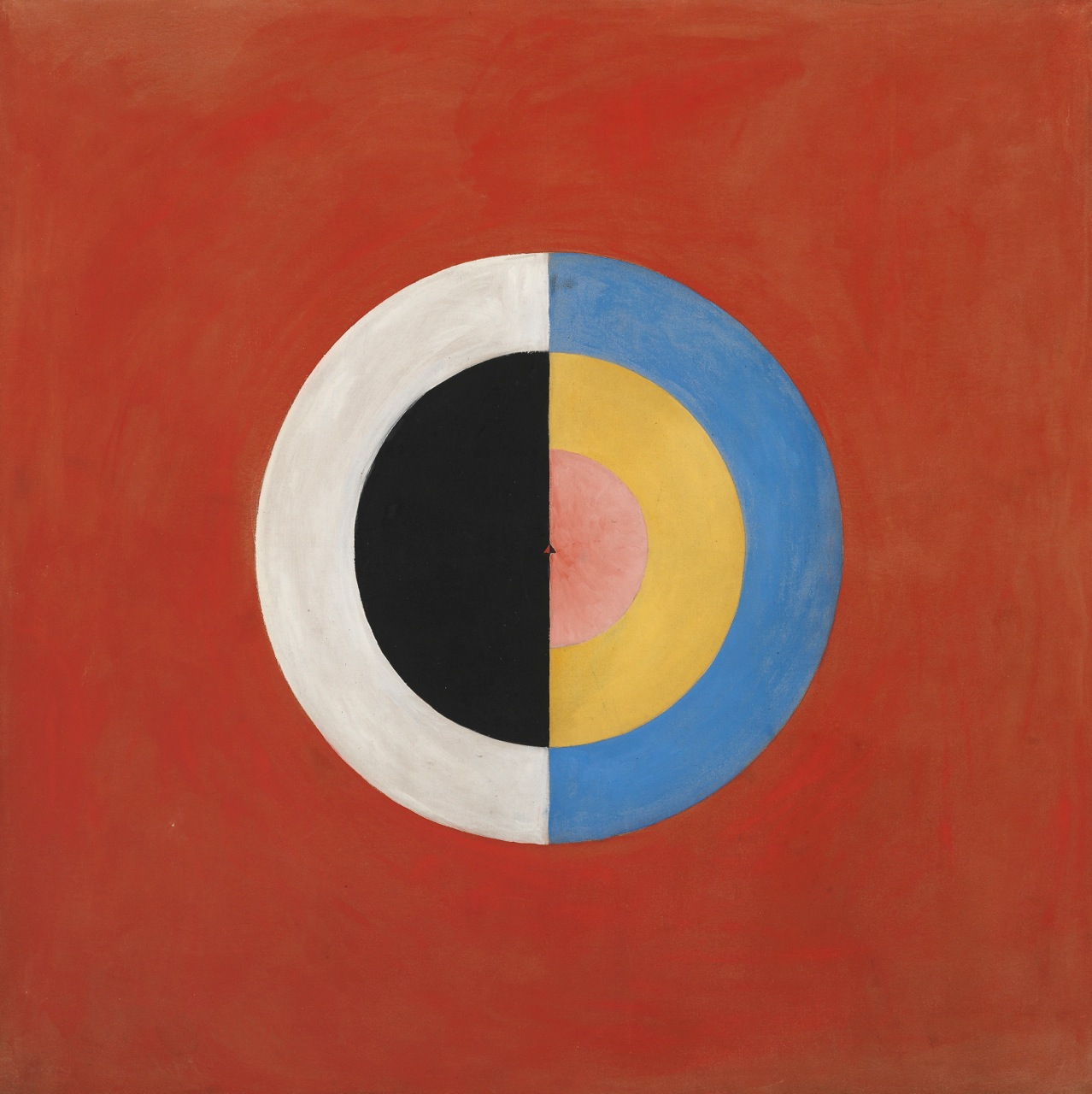
Hilma af Klint, Svanen (The Swan), October 1914-March 1915, No. 17, Group IX, Series SUW (this abstract work was never exhibited during af Klint's lifetime)

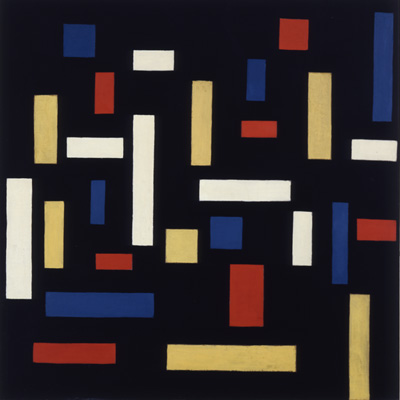
Theo van Doesburg, Composition VII (The Three Graces), 1917, neoplasticism

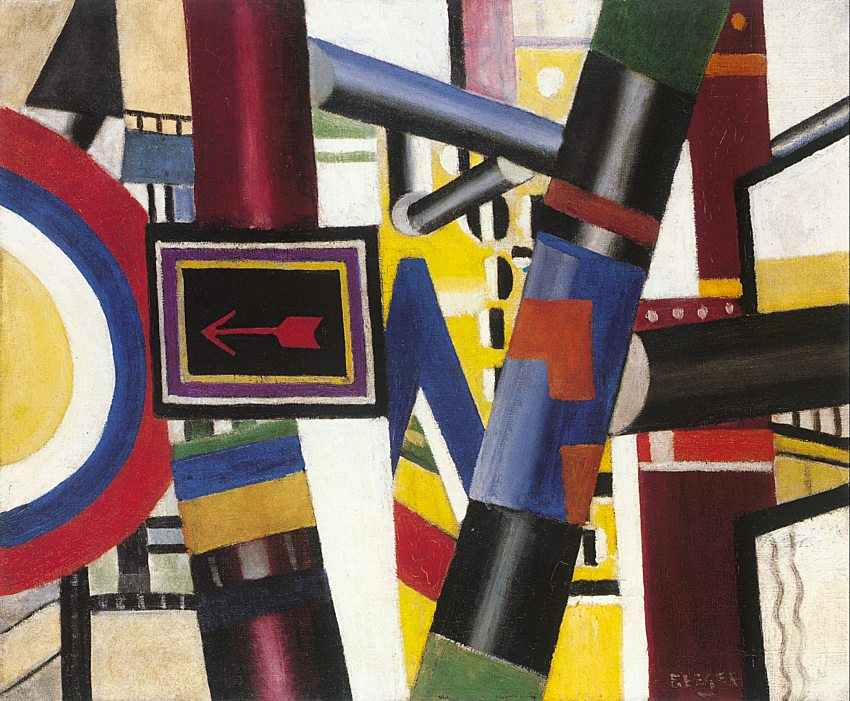
Fernand Léger, The Railway Crossing, 1919, oil on canvas, 53.8 × 64.8 cm, The Art Institute of Chicago

Joseph Csaky, Deux figures, 1920, relief, limestone, polychrome, 80 cm, Kröller-Müller Museum, Otterlo

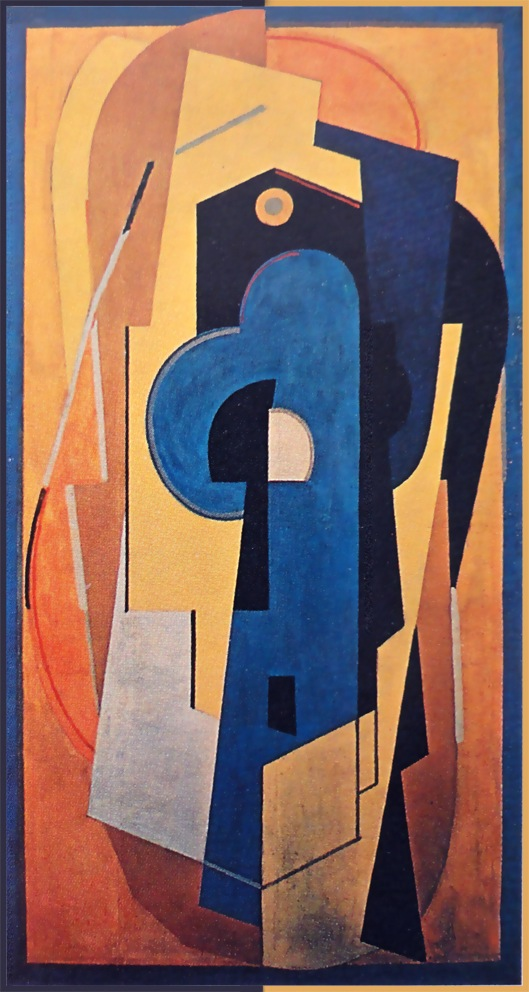
Albert Gleizes, Composition bleu et jaune (Composition jaune), 1921, oil on canvas, 200.5 × 110 cm

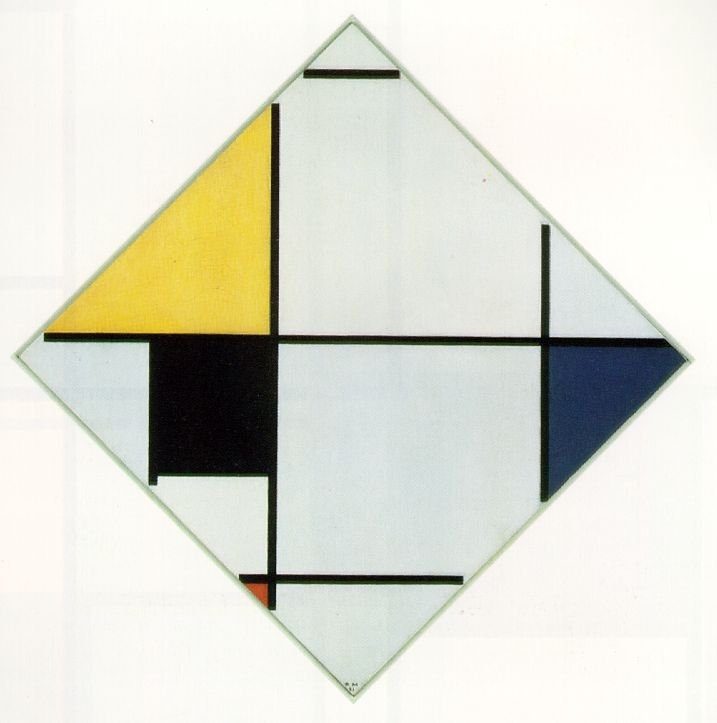
Piet Mondrian, Composition with Yellow, Black, Blue, Red, and Gray, 1921, Art Institute of Chicago

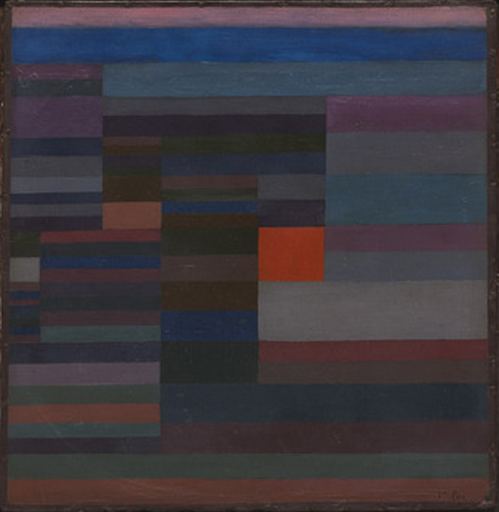
Paul Klee, Fire in the Evening, 1929

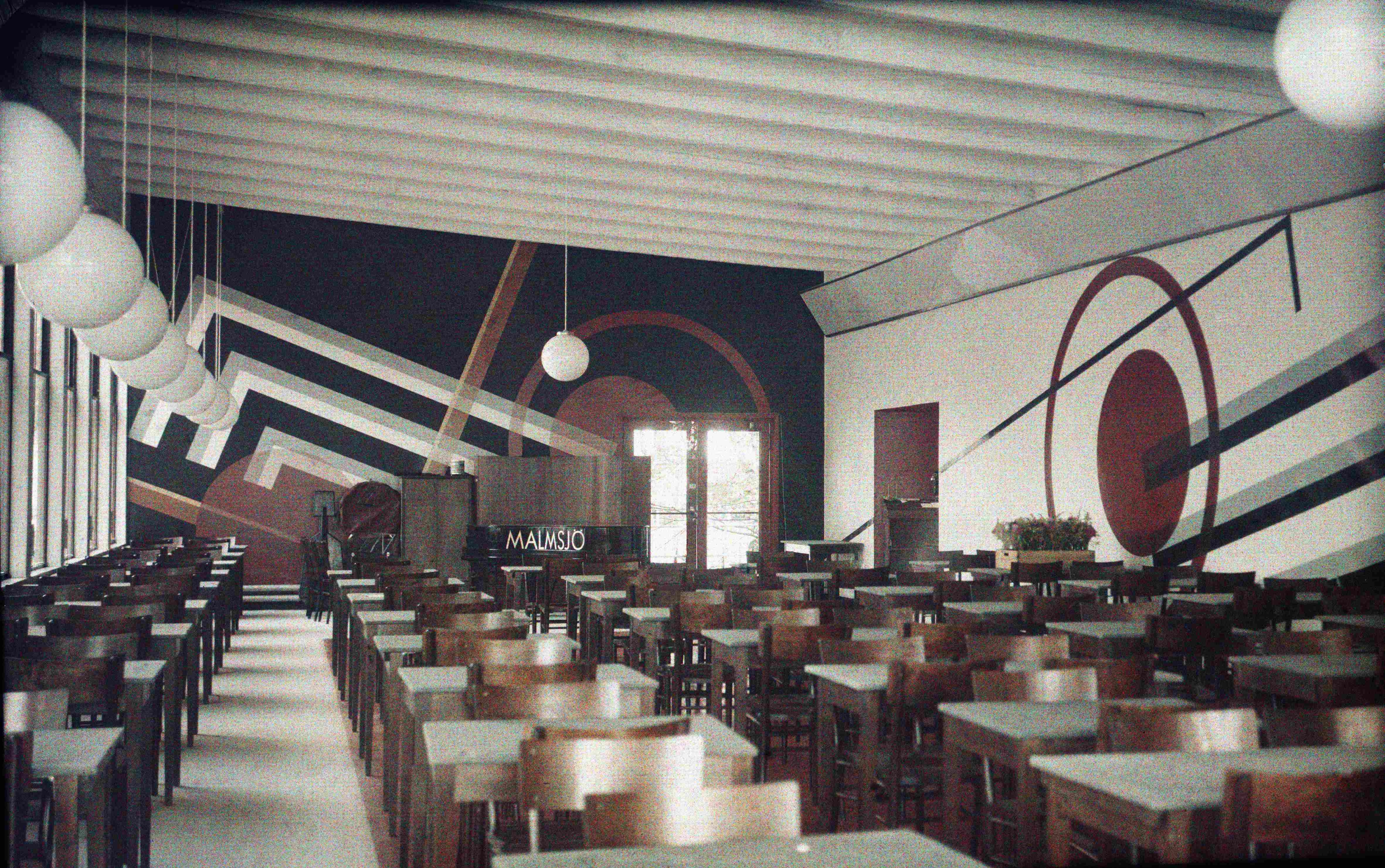
Otto Gustaf Carlsund, Rapid, 1930, a concrete art restaurant mural, Stockholm

Barnett Newman, Onement 1, 1948, The Museum of Modern Art, New York

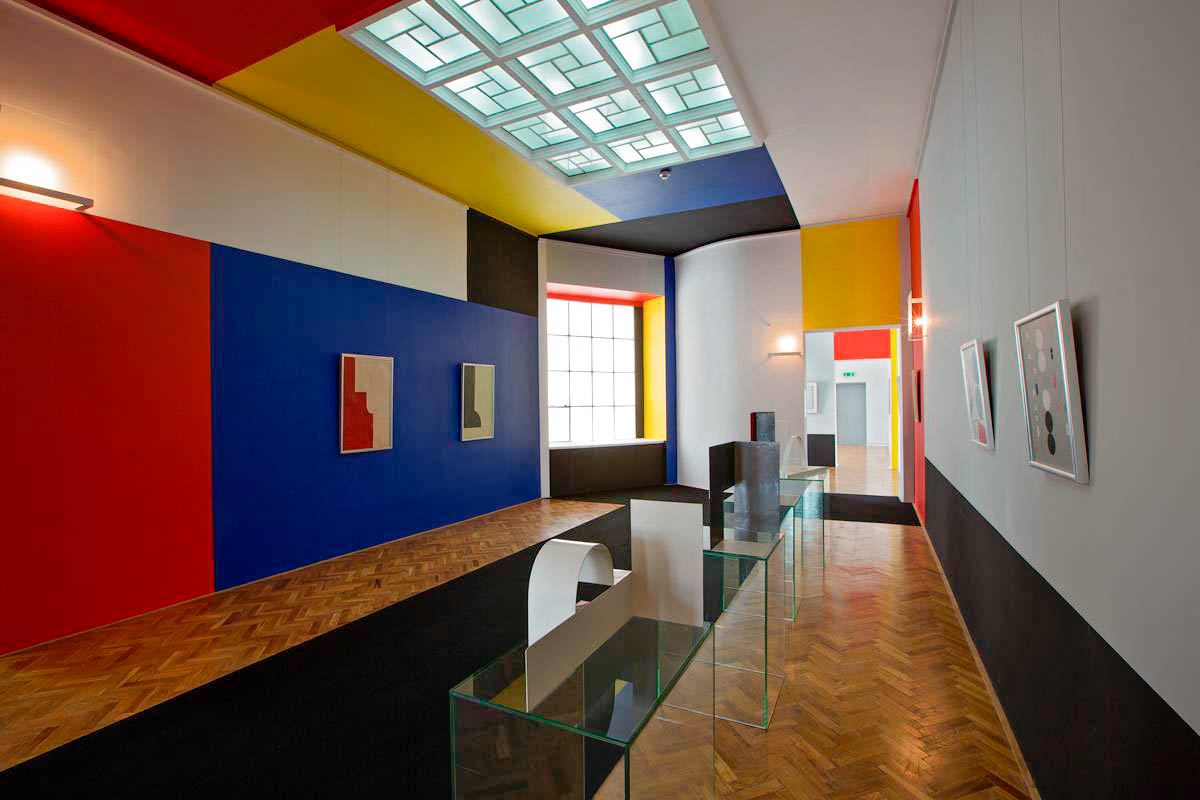
Sala Neoplastyczna (Neoplastic Room) designed in 1948 by Władysław Strzemiński at the Museum of Art in Łódź

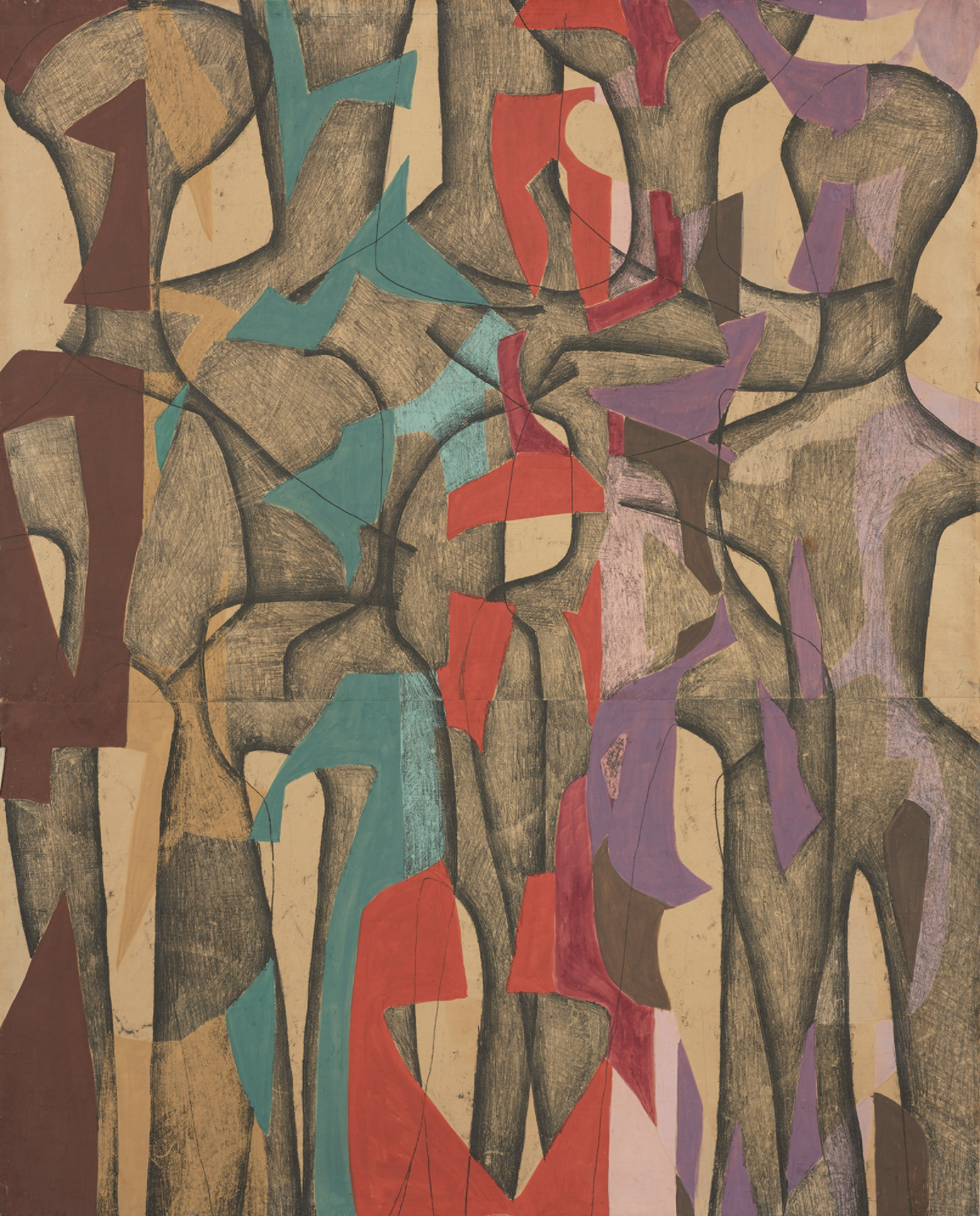
Maria Jarema, Wyrazy. Kompozycja abstrakcyjna, 1956, tempera and monotype on paper, National Museum in Szczecin

Wojciech Fangor, Number 17, 1963, oil on canvas, The Museum of Modern Art, New York

Lee Krasner, Rising Green, 1972, oil on canvas, The Metropolitan Museum of Art, New York

== See also ==
- Abstraction
- Abstract art by African-American artists
- Abstract expressionism
- Action painting
- American Abstract Artists
- Art history
- Art periods
- Asemic writing
- Bauhaus
- Color field
- Concrete art
- Constructivism
- Cubism
- Dada
- De Stijl
- Form constant
- Formalism
- Futurism
- Geometric abstraction
- Hard-edge
- History of painting
- Lyrical abstraction
- Minimalism
- Neoplasticism
- Op Art
- Orphism
- Rayism
- Representation (arts)
- Spatialism
- Suprematism
- Surrealism
- Synchromism
- Vorticism
- Western painting

In other media

- Absolute music
- Abstract animation
- Abstract comics
- Abstract photography
- Atonality
- Avant-garde music
- Bauhaus dances
- Concrete poetry
- Experimental film
- Indeterminacy
- Literary nonsense
- Minimal music
- Modern dance
- Modern art
- Musique concréte
- New Formalism
- Noise music
- Sound poetry

== Sources ==
- Compton, Susan (1978). The World Backwards: Russian Futurist Books 1912–16. The British Library. ISBN 978-0-7141-0396-9.
- Stangos, Nikos, ed. (1981). Concepts of Modern Art. Thames and Hudson. ISBN 978-0-500-20186-2.
- Gooding, Mel (2001). Abstract Art. Movements in Modern Art series. Tate Publishing. ISBN 978-1-85437-302-1.
- Rump, Gerhard Charles (1985). How to look at an abstract painting. Inter Nationes.
