= Animal Trainer =

Painting by Francis Picabia

- Dresseur d'animaux (French)
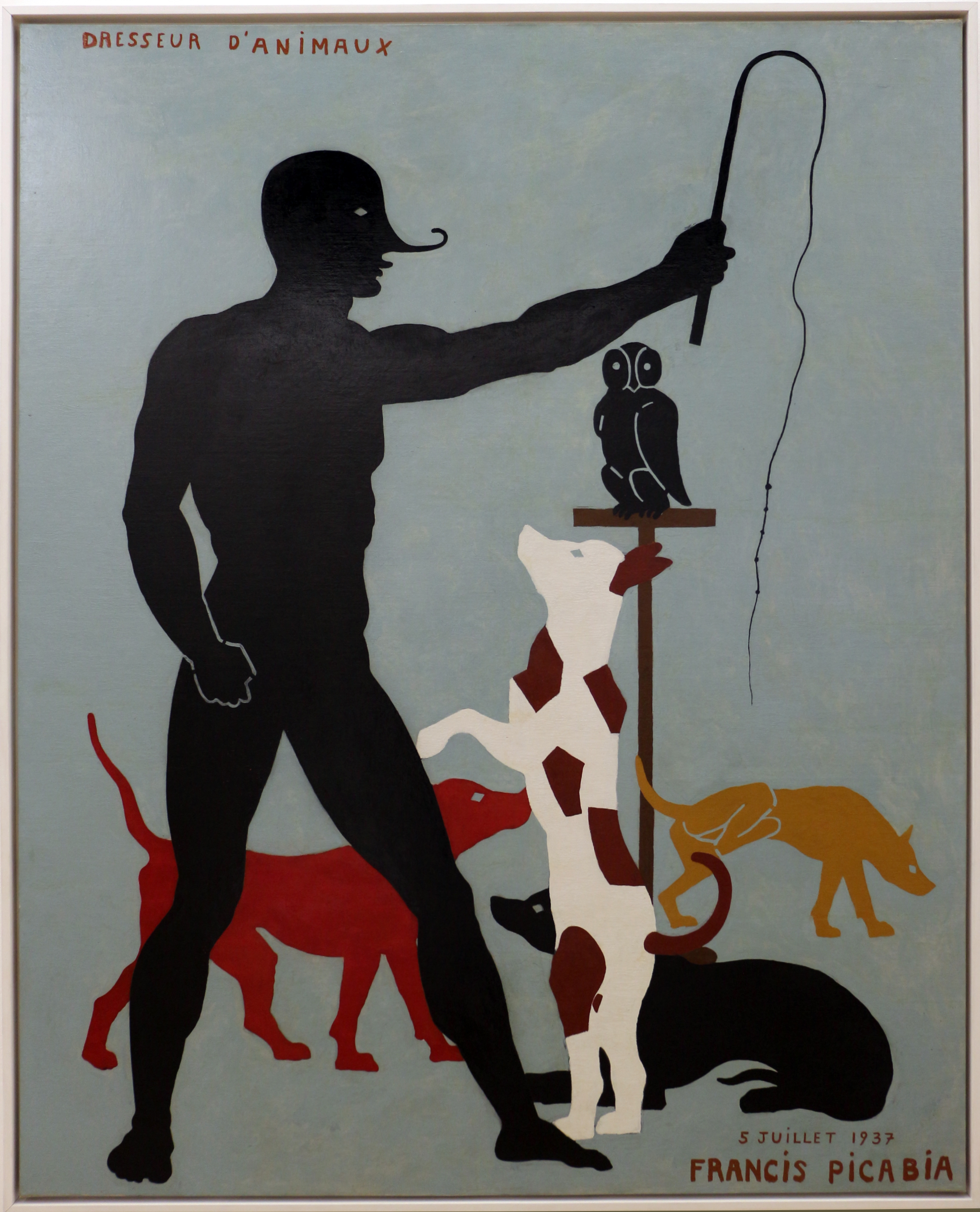
- Artist: Francis Picabia
- Year: 1923
- Medium: enamel on canvas
- Dimensions: 250 cm × 200 cm (98 in × 79 in)
- Location: Musée National d'Art Moderne, Paris

Animal Trainer is an enamel on canvas painting by the French painter Francis Picabia, created in 1923. It is held at the Musée National d'Art Moderne, in Paris.

== Description and analysis ==
This painting represents a male black silhouette, with a long nose, raising his also black whip above four dogs of different colours on the ground and an owl on a perch, in a grey background. The dogs seem indifferent to his command, with the exception of one of them, who stands in front of him. The scene appears circus inspired but its meant to be most likely an ironic allegory to the current state of modern art. The title appears in the upper left corner and the artist's signature in the opposite corner, where the work is falsely dated of July 5, 1937.

The painting is probably intended to mock the return to order artistic movement then underway in modern art by representing it allegorically as a tamer not of wild beasts but instead of domestic dogs. It thus suggests that the Salon d'Automne of 1923, where it was exhibited, had lost the audacity of past, like the 1905 edition, which had launched fauvism.

== See also ==
- List of works by Francis Picabia
