= Midi (Promenade des Anglais) =

Painting by Francis Picabia

Midi (Promenade des Anglais) is a mixed media painting by French artist Francis Picabia. It was made with oil, feathers, macaroni, and leather on canvas between 1924 and 1925. The painting is contained within a frame made from snakeskin by Pierre Legrain.

It was donated to the Yale University Art Gallery, in New Haven, along with other items from the collection of the Société Anonyme and forms part of Yale's permanent art collection.

== See also ==
- List of works by Francis Picabia
- Promenade des Anglais
