= Otho Lloyd =

Spanish painter (1885–1979)

- Born: 1885; London, England
- Died: 1979 (aged 93–94); Barcelona
- Education: André Dunoyer de Segonzac, Henri Matisse
- Known for: Painting

Otho Lloyd (1885‒1979) was a painter and photographer married to the Russian émigré artist Olga Sacharoff. He was the elder brother of Arthur Cravan and a nephew of Constance Lloyd Wilde, the wife of the Irish writer and poet Oscar Wilde.

== Life and career ==
Otho was born in London to the wealthy lawyer Otho Holland Lloyd and Hélène Clara St. Clair, a governess known as Nellie. The couple had married the previous year despite the reservations of Lloyd's family. Otho Holland Lloyd abandoned his wife soon after the birth of their second child, Fabien Avenarius, the future Arthur Cravan, in 1887. Nellie sued for divorce and won a substantial settlement before she married the Swiss doctor Henri Grandjean. Otho was educated in Switzerland and England and studied painting in the studios of André Dunoyer de Segonzac and Henri Matisse. Before World War I, he was active in Munich, where he lived off a substantial remittance from his mother. He met his future wife while living in Germany and the couple moved to Paris in about 1912.

Otho postponed a professional career until 1939, when he finally felt "fully prepared" to appear in public. At his first exhibition, a two-person show held at the Perls Galleries in New York City, he exhibited eight paintings dating from the years between 1930 and 1938, including Les Toits de Paris (1930), Pont des Arts à Paris (1930), Paysage d'Espagne (1932), Vue de Tossa (1932), Vue de Mougins (1933), Les Oliviers du Cannet (1937), Paysage des Environs de Paris (1938), and Pont-Neuf à Paris (1938).
