= The Spring =

1912 painting by Francis Picabia

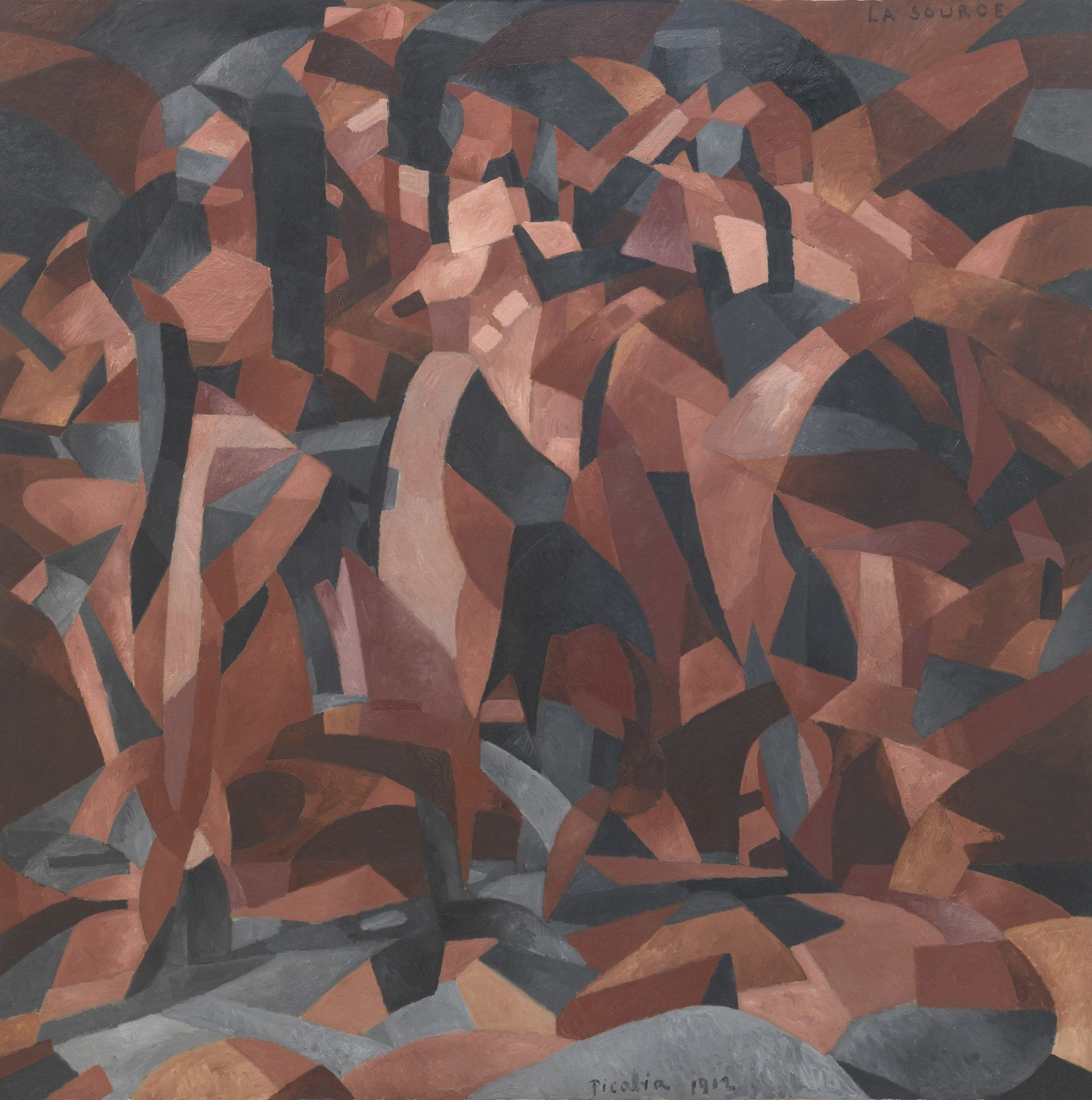
- Artist: Francis Picabia
- Year: 1912
- Medium: Oil on canvas
- Dimensions: 249.6 cm × 249.3 cm (98.26 in × 98.14 in)
- Location: Museum of Modern Art; New York

The Spring (or La Source) is a large oil painting created in 1912 by the French artist Francis Picabia. The work, both Cubist and abstract, was exhibited in Paris at the Salon d'Automne of 1912. The Cubist contribution to the 1912 Salon d'Automne created a controversy in the Municipal Council of Paris, leading to a debate in the Chambre des Députés about the use of public funds to provide the venue for such 'barbaric' art. The Cubists were defended by the Socialist deputy, Marcel Sembat. This painting was realized as Albert Gleizes and Jean Metzinger, in preparation for the Salon de la Section d'Or, published a major defence of Cubism, resulting in the first theoretical essay on the new movement, Du «Cubisme». The painting forms part of the permanent collection of the Museum of Modern Art, New York City.

== Background ==
The Spring is an oil painting on canvas with dimensions 249.6 x 249.3 cm (8' 2 1/4" x 8' 2 1/8"). It was executed by Picabia upon return from a road trip with two friends; the poet Guillaume Apollinaire and the composer Claude Debussy, during the summer of 1912. During the trip, Picabia is quoted: "Are blue and red unintelligible? Are not the circle and the triangle, volumes and colors, as intelligible as this table?"

== 1912 Salon d'Automne ==
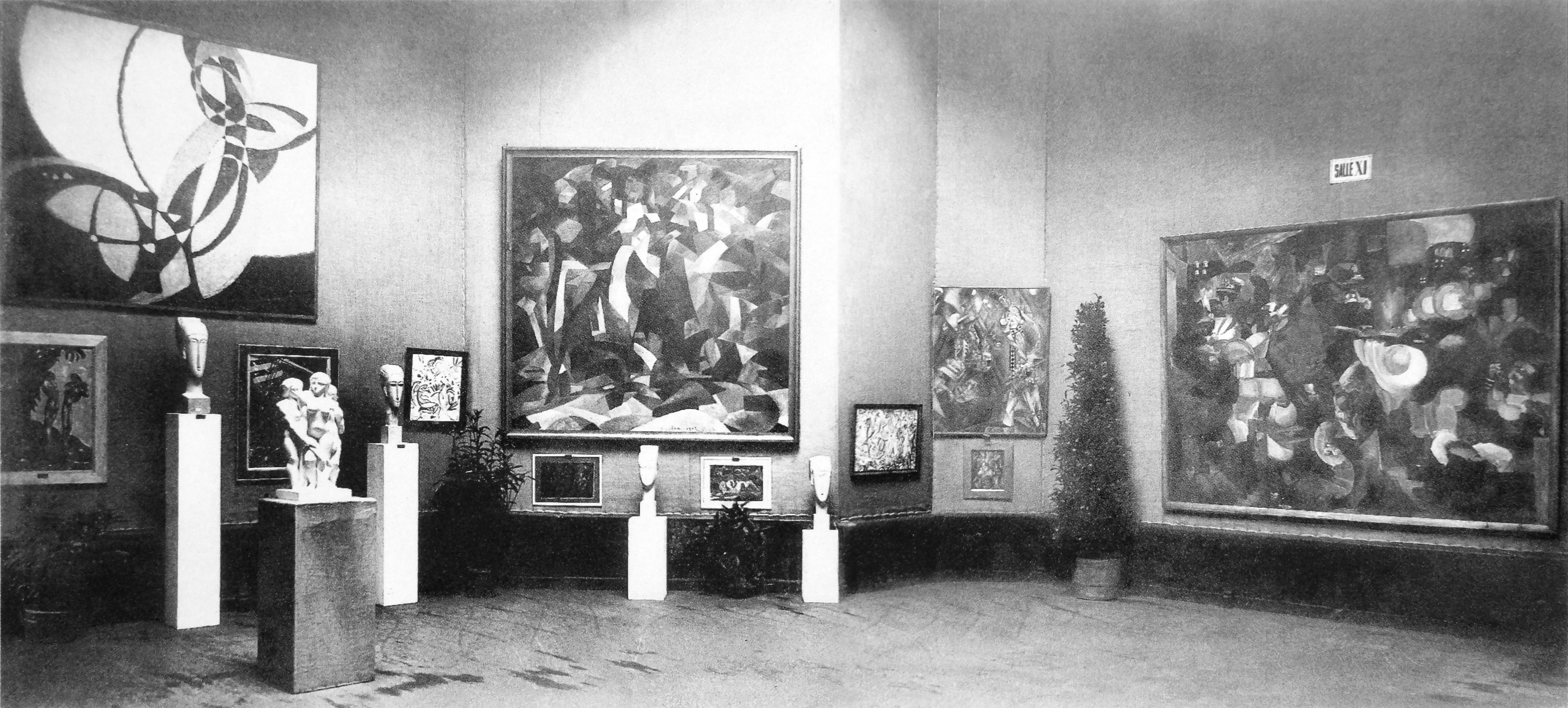
Salon d'Automne, Salle XI, Grand Palais des Champs-Élysées, Paris, between 1 October and 8 November 1912. Exhibited: Joseph Csaky (Groupe de femmes, sculpture front the left), Amedeo Modigliani four sculptures on white bases. Other works are shown by Jean Metzinger (Dancer in a café), František Kupka (Amorpha, Fugue in Two Colors), Francis Picabia (The Spring) and Henri Le Fauconnier (Mountaineers Attacked by Bears)

The Salon d'Automne of 1912, held in Paris at the Grand Palais from 1 October to 8 November, saw the Cubists regrouped into the same room XI. The history of the Salon d'Automne is marked by two important dates: 1905, bore witness to the birth of Fauvism, and 1912, the xenophobe and anti-modernist quarrel. The 1912 polemic leveled against both the French and non-French avant-garde artists originated in Salle XI where the Cubists exhibited their works. The resistance to foreigners (dubbed "apaches") and avant-garde artists was just the visible face of a more profound crises: that of defining modern French art, and the dwindling of an artistic system crystallized around the heritage of Impressionism centered in Paris. Burgeoning was a new avant-garde system, the international logic of which—mercantile and médiatique—put into question the modern ideology elaborated upon since the late 19th century. What had begun as a question of aesthetics quickly turned political, and as in the 1905 Salon d'Automne, with his infamous "Donatello chez les fauves", the critic Louis Vauxcelles (Les Arts, 1912) was most implicated in the deliberations. Recall too, it was Vauxcelles who, on the occasion of the 1910 Salon des Indépendants, wrote disparagingly of 'pallid cubes' with reference to the paintings of Metzinger, Gleizes, Le Fauconnier, Léger and Delaunay.

The Cubist contribution to the 1912 Salon d'Automne created scandal regarding the use of government owned buildings, such as the Grand Palais, to exhibit such artwork. The indignation of the politician Jean Pierre Philippe Lampué made the front page of Le Journal, 5 October 1912. On 3 December 1912 the controversy spread to the Municipal Council of Paris. A debate transpired in the Chambre des Députés about the use of public funds to provide the venue for such art. The Cubists were defended by the Socialist deputy, Marcel Sembat.

- Francis Picabia, La Source (The Spring), 1912 (Museum of Modern Art, New York)
- Jean Metzinger entered three works: Dancer in a café (titled Danseuse), La Plume Jaune (The Yellow Feather), Femme à l'Éventail (Woman with a Fan) (Solomon R. Guggenheim Museum, New York), hung in the decorative arts section inside La Maison Cubiste (the Cubist House).
- Fernand Léger exhibited La Femme en Bleu (Woman in Blue), 1912 (Kunstmuseum, Basel) and Le passage à niveau (The Level Crossing), 1912 (Fondation Beyeler, Riehen, Switzerland)
- Roger de La Fresnaye, Les Baigneuse (The bathers) 1912 (The National Gallery, Washington) and Les joueurs de cartes (Card Players)
- Henri Le Fauconnier, The Huntsman (Haags Gemeentemuseum, The Hague, Netherlands) and Les Montagnards attaqués par des ours (Mountaineers Attacked by Bears), 1912 (Museum of Art, Rhode Island School of Design).
- Albert Gleizes, l'Homme au Balcon (Man on a Balcony), (Portrait of Dr. Théo Morinaud), 1912 (Philadelphia Museum of Art), also exhibited at the Armory Show, New York, Chicago, Boston, 1913.
- André Lhote, Le jugement de Paris, 1912 (Private collection)
- František Kupka, Amorpha, Fugue à deux couleurs (Fugue in Two Colors), 1912 (Narodni Galerie, Prague), and Amorpha Chromatique Chaude.
- Alexander Archipenko, Family Life, 1912, sculpture
- Amedeo Modigliani, exhibited four elongated and highly stylized heads), sculptures
- Joseph Csaky exhibited the sculptures Groupe de femmes, 1911-1912 (location unknown), Portrait de M.S.H., no. 91 (location unknown), and Danseuse (Femme à l'éventail, Femme à la cruche), no. 405 (location unknown)

This exhibition also featured La Maison Cubiste. Raymond Duchamp-Villon designed facade of a 10 meter by 3 meter house, which included a hall, a living room and a bedroom. This installation was placed in the Art Décoratif section of the Salon d'Automne. The major contributors were André Mare, a decorative designer, Roger de La Fresnaye, Jacques Villon and Marie Laurencin. In the house were hung cubist paintings by Marcel Duchamp, Albert Gleizes, Fernand Léger, Roger de La Fresnaye, and Jean Metzinger (Woman with a Fan, 1912).

In a review of the exhibition published in Le Petit Parisien, art critic Jean Claude writes of Picabia's entries:

I believe that the record of high fantasy is held this year by Mr. Picabia. His two entries are entitled La Source and Danses à la source. These are beautiful titles... The two paintings, I must say, do not accord with them at all. They are vast panels, on which have been drawn triangles, rhombuses, trapezoids, squares, rectangles, all crooked, and mixing in their inextricable entanglement the brown with the pink, the brick with the red nasturtium and the green bluish to reddish black. It's ugly. It evokes incrusted linoleum and it has no utility.

Of works by Léger, Gleizes and Metzinger, Jean Claude writes: "Mr. Léger walked his brush on the canvas after having dipped them in blue, black, red and brown. It is stupefying to look at. The catalog says it's a Woman in blue. Poor woman. Man on a Balcony, by Mr. Gleizes, is more comprehensible. At least in the chaos of cubes and trapezoids we find a man. I will say as much for the entry of Mr. Metzinger, Dancers. It has the effect of a puzzle that is not assembled properly".

== See also ==
- List of works by Francis Picabia
- Orphism (art)
