= The Procession, Seville =

1912 painting by Francis Picabia

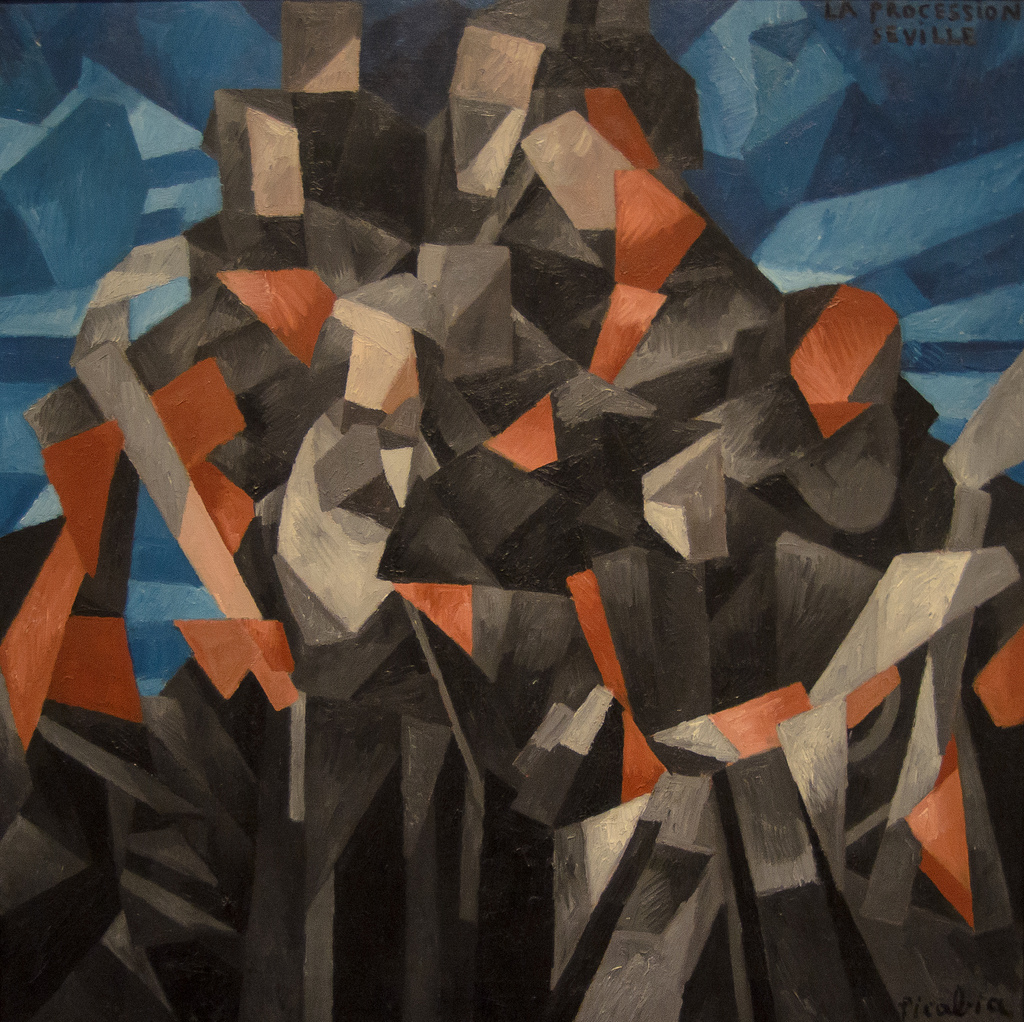
- Artist: Francis Picabia
- Year: 1912
- Medium: Oil on canvas
- Dimensions: 121.9 cm × 121.9 cm (48.0 in × 48.0 in)
- Location: National Gallery of Art; Washington, D.C.

The Procession, Seville is an oil on canvas painting by French artist Francis Picabia, created in 1912. It is held at the National Gallery of Art, in Washington, D.C.

== History and description ==
The painting was first exhibited at the Salon de la Section d'Or in 1912, at the Salon des Indépendants in 1913 and then at the Armory Show, in Chicago, the same year.

It depicts his interpretation of a religious procession in Seville, Spain, a country that he had visited in 1909 during his honeymoon. It reveals both the influence of the analytic cubism of Pablo Picasso and Georges Braque, and of Italian futurist painters like Gino Severini and Umberto Boccioni, with the semi-abstract presence of bodies in motion.

== See also ==
- List of works by Francis Picabia
