= List of works by Francis Picabia =

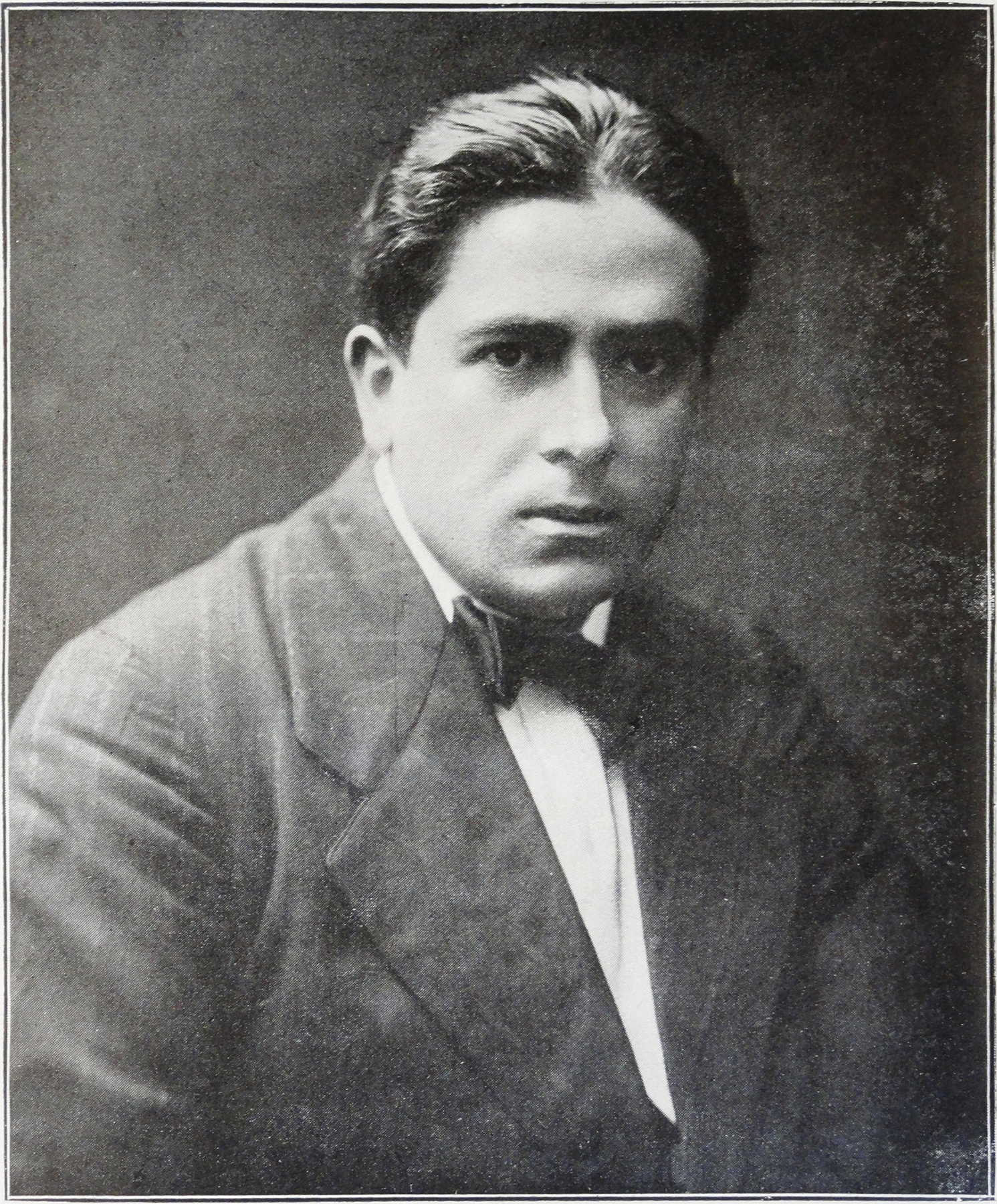
Francis Picabia, photograph published in Les Peintres Cubistes, 1913

This is a list of works by Francis Picabia (22 January 1879 – 30 November 1953), French avant-garde artist, painter, poet and typographist, whose work is associated with Cubism, Abstract art, Dada and Surrealism.

== Artworks ==
Painting	Name	French name	Year	Technique	Dimensions	City	Gallery	Notes
		Caoutchouc	c. 1909	Watercolor, gouache, and ink on cardboard	47.5 x 61.5 cm	Paris	Musée National d'Art Moderne, Centre Pompidou	
	Horses	Chevaux	1910-11	Oil on canvas	73.3 x 92.5 cm	Paris	Musée National d'Art Moderne, Centre Pompidou	
	Landscape at Cassis	Paysage à Cassis	c.1910-11	Oil on canvas	50.3 × 61.5 cm		Private collection	
	Grimaldi after the rain	Grimaldi après la pluie	c. 1912					
	The Red Tree	L'Arbre rouge (Grimaldi après la pluie)	c.1912	Oil on canvas	92.5 x 73.4 cm	Paris	Musée National d'Art Moderne, Centre Pompidou	
	The Red Tree	L'Arbre rouge (Grimaldi après la pluie)	c.1912	Oil on canvas	92.5 x 73.4 cm	Paris	Musée National d'Art Moderne, Centre Pompidou	
		Tarentelle	1912	Oil on canvas	73.6 x 92.1 cm	New York City	Museum of Modern Art	
	The Procession, Seville	La Procession, Seville	1912	Oil on canvas	121.9 x 121.9 cm	Washington DC	National Gallery of Art	
	The Dance at the Spring	La danse au printemps	1912	Oil on canvas	120.5 x 120.6 cm	Philadelphia	Philadelphia Museum of Art	
	Edtaonisl	Ecclesiastic	1913	Oil on canvas	300.4 x 300.7 cm	Chicago	Art Institute of Chicago	
	Catch as Catch Can	La Source	1913	Oil on canvas	105.4 x 86.4 cm	Philadelphia	Philadelphia Museum of Art	
	Udnie (Young American Girl, The Dance)	Udnie (Jeune fille américaine, danse)	1913	Oil on canvas	290 x 300 cm	Paris	Musée National d'Art Moderne, Centre Pompidou	
	Star Dancer on a Transatlantic Steamer		1913	Watercolor				
	Cosmic Force	Force Comique	1913–14	Watercolor and graphite on paper	63.4 x 52.7 cm	Pittsfield, Massachusetts	Berkshire Museum	
	Girl Born Without a Mother	Fille née sans mère	1915	Published in 291 (magazine)	47.4 x 31.7 cm	Paris	Musée d'Orsay	
		(Left) Le saint des saints c'est de moi qu'il s'agit dans ce portrait, 1 July 1915; (center) Portrait d'une jeune fille americaine dans l'état de nudité, 5 July 1915: (right) J'ai vu et c'est de toi qu'il s'agit, De Zayas! De Zayas! Je suis venu sur les rivages du Pont-Euxin, New York, 1915	1915					
		Ici, c'est ici Stieglitz, foi et amour	1915	Published cover of 291 (magazine), No. 1				
		Voilà Haviland (la poésie est comme lui), Portrait mécanomorphe de Paul B. Haviland	1915					
	Machine Turn Quickly	Machine, Tournez Vite	1916	Tempera on paper	49 x 32 cm		Private collection	
	Universal Prostitution	Prostitution Universelle	1916–17	Black ink, tempera, metallic paint on cardboard	74.5 x 94.2 cm	New Haven CT.	Yale University Art Gallery	
	Flamenca	Flamenca	1917	Published in 391 (magazine)				
		Lampe Illusion	1917	Published in 391 (magazine)				
		Marie, Barcelone	1917	Published in 391 (magazine). No 3, March 1				
		Peigne, Miroir de l'Apparence	1917	Published in 391 (magazine), No. 2, February 10				
		Américaine	1917	Published in 391 (magazine), No. 6, July				
		Âne	1917	Published in 391 (magazine), No. 6, July				
		Molèculaire	1919	Published in 391 (magazine), No. 8, February				
		Danse de Saint-Guy	1919	Published in The Little Review, Autumn 1922				
	Alarm Clock	Réveil Matin	1919	Published in Dada, 4-5, Number 5, 15 May				
	Alarm Clock	Réveil Matin	1919	Ink on paper	31.8 x 23 cm	London	Tate	
	Dada Movement		1919	Published in Dada, 4-5, Number 5, 15 May				
		Portrait of Cézanne, Portrait of Renoir, Portrait of Rembrandt	1920	Toy monkey and oil on cardboard	Reproduced in Cannibale, Paris, n. 1, April 25	Whereabouts unknown		
		Francis chante le Coq	1920	Published in 391 (magazine)				
		Ce numéro est entouré d'une dentelle rose.	1920	Published in 391 (magazine), No. 13				
	The Blessed Virgin	La Sainte Vierge	1920	Ink and graphite on paper. Published in Dada, 4-5, Number 5, 15 May	33 x 24 cm	Paris	Musée National d'Art Moderne, Centre Pompidou	
		L'oeil cacodylate	1921	Oil and collage on canvas	148.6 x 117.4 cm	Paris	Musée National d'Art Moderne, Centre Pompidou	
		Optophone I	1919	Watercolor and graphite on paper	72 x 60 cm			
	Phosphate		1922	Published in Littérature magazine, No. 6, New Series, 1 November				
	Aviation		1922	Ink, crayon, watercolor on paper	79.9 x 54 cm	Providence, Rhode Island	RISD Museum	
	Astrolabe		1922	Galeries Dalmau exhibition catalogue				
		Thermomètre pour aveugles	1922	Galeries Dalmau exhibition catalogue				
		Femme Espagnole (Espagnole à la cigarette)	1922	Watercolor, gouache and pencil on paper	72 x 51 cm			
