= Olga Sacharoff =

Spanish painter (1889–1967)

- Born: 1889; Tiflis, Russian Empire
- Died: 1967 (aged 77–78); Barcelona, Spain
- Education: Tbilisi State Academy of Arts
- Known for: Painting
- Movement: Cubism, naive art, Surrealism
- Awards: Medalla de oro de Barcelona

Olga Nicolaevna Sacharoff (Note: Also spelled Sakhorova, Zakharova, or Zacharoff.) (Russian: Ольга Николаевна Сахарова; May 28, 1889 ‒ 1967) was a Spanish artist of Russo-Persian origin associated with naive art and the Surrealist movement.

== Life and work ==
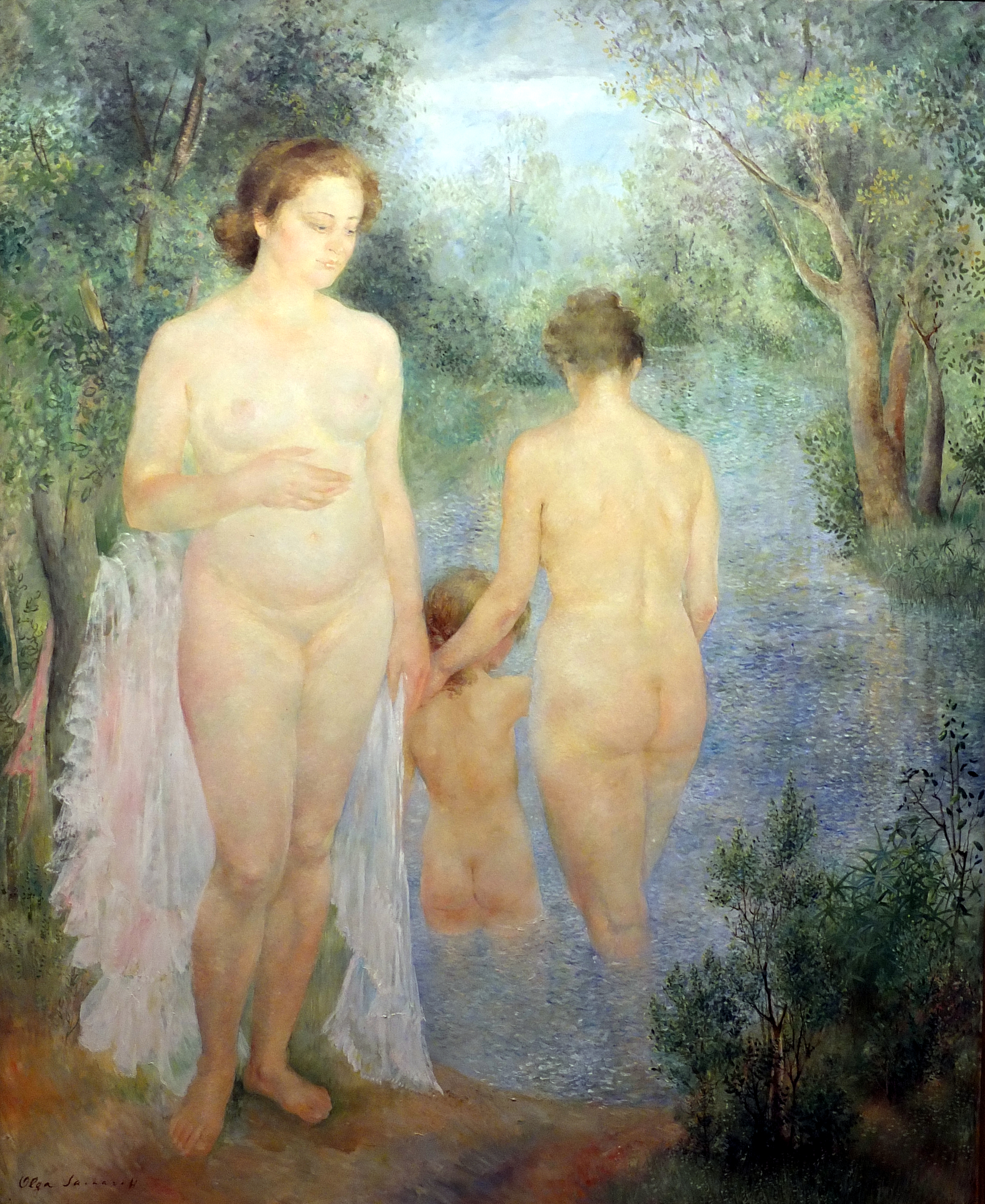
By the River, Olga Sacharoff, Museum of Montserrat

Olga Sacharoff was born in Tiflis in the Russian Empire (present-day Georgia). Her father was Russian, while her mother was of Persian origin. After studying at the Tbilisi State Academy of Arts, she visited Rome and traveled to Munich, where she came in contact with the German Expressionist movement. In Germany, she met her future husband, the photographer and painter Otho Lloyd.

Beginning in 1909, Sacharoff regularly visited Paris. By 1912, she and Lloyd had settled in the city and were married. She exhibited frequently, in solo as well as group shows, including the annual exhibitions organized by the Salon d'Automne. Initially, her work was influenced by Paul Cézanne; soon after her move to Paris, however, she became fascinated with radical or synthetique Cubism. Both Sacharoff and Lloyd became active members of the circle that formed around the Russian émigré avant-garde artist Marie Vassilieff.

The outbreak of World War I forced Sacharoff and Lloyd to relocate to Spain. The couple initially settled in Mallorca, but moved to Barcelona in 1915 or 1916. From 1917 to 1924, Sacharoff collaborated with Francis Picabia on the magazine 391, which is considered representative of Dadaism. Among those writers and artists appearing in the four issues of the magazine were Guillaume Apollinaire and Marie Laurencin. During this period, Sacharoff developed a colorful "naïve" style influenced by Henri Rousseau.

Sacharoff continued to participate in the Salon d'Automne; her work was also featured in the annual shows of the Salon des Tuileries and the Société des Artistes Indépendants. Although her involvement in these exhibitions required that she spend significant time in Paris, she maintained a home in Barcelona. Sacharoff and Lloyd separated in 1929 and, depressed by the breakup of her marriage, Sacharoff stopped painting for approximately five years. She resurfaced in 1934 with an exhibit at Barcelona's Laietanes Gallery. In 1939, Perls Galleries in New York City organized a two-person exhibition featuring paintings by Sacharoff and Lloyd, which suggests a possible reconciliation between the couple. The Galería Syra, Barcelona, mounted exhibitions of her work in 1950 and 1955, and in February 1960, she was the focus of a solo show organized by the Dirección General de Bellas Artes and on view in the department's exhibition hall in Madrid. She was awarded the Medalla d'or de Barcelona in 1964, an honor that established her connection to Spain and commemorated her contribution to Catalan culture. The Museu Nacional d'Art de Catalunya, Barcelona, and the Museo de Art Nouveau y Art Déco, Salamanca, are two of several Spanish institutions that have collected her paintings.

Sacharoff also worked in book illustration: her projects included Colette's House of Claudine and Fyodor Dostoyevsky's Netochka Nezvanova.
