= Bauhaus dances =

Set within the Bauhaus design school, the Bauhaus dances were created by Oskar Schlemmer, along with Paul Klee and Wassily Kandinsky, for series of lecture dances between 1927 and 1929. They took as inspiration the architectonic cubical stage space designed by Walter Gropius for the Dessau Bauhaus, which opened in 1926. The dances draw on simple gestures—walking, sitting, jumping—the dancers are to be perceived as figures symbolizing the potential of new technology while remaining primarily an exploration of the human element.

The use of color as code for tempo was employed, as well as props in basic geometric forms. The deconstruction or "elementarization" of dance is expressed in the titles of the dances: Form dance, Gesture dance, Space dance, Scenery dance and Hoop dance. The dances were related to Schlemmer's investigations into abstract dance in his Triadic Ballet of 1922.

The dances are performed in museums occasionally around the world, the most recently being in 2010 at the Museum of Modern Art in New York.
