= Léopold Survage =

Russian-French painter (1879–1968)

Léopold Survage (left) with Robert Delaunay and Albert Gleizes prior to the Exposition Internationale des Arts et Techniques dans la Vie Moderne

Léopold Frédéric Léopoldowitsch Survage (French pronunciation: [leɔpɔl(d) syʁvaʒ]; 31 July 1879 – 31 October 1968) was a Russian-French painter of Finnish origin. Trained in Moscow, he identified with the Russian avant-garde before moving to Paris, where he shared a studio with Amedeo Modigliani and experimented with abstract films. He also gained commissions for Serge Diaghilev's Ballets Russes.

== Nationality ==
Survage was French, of Russian-Danish-Finnish descent, born in Lappeenranta, Finland (with selected references indicating a birthplace of Moscow, Russia). Variant names included Léopold Sturzwage, Leopold Sturwage, Leopoldij Sturzwasgh and Leopoldij Lvovich Sturzwage.

== Biography ==
Léopold Survage, La ville, ca. 1912

Léopold Survage, 1920, La Ville (The Town), oil on canvas, 254 x 152 cm (black and white photographic reproduction)

Léopold Survage, La Ville (Stadt)

Léopold Survage, invitation, Galerie de L’Effort Moderne, November 1920

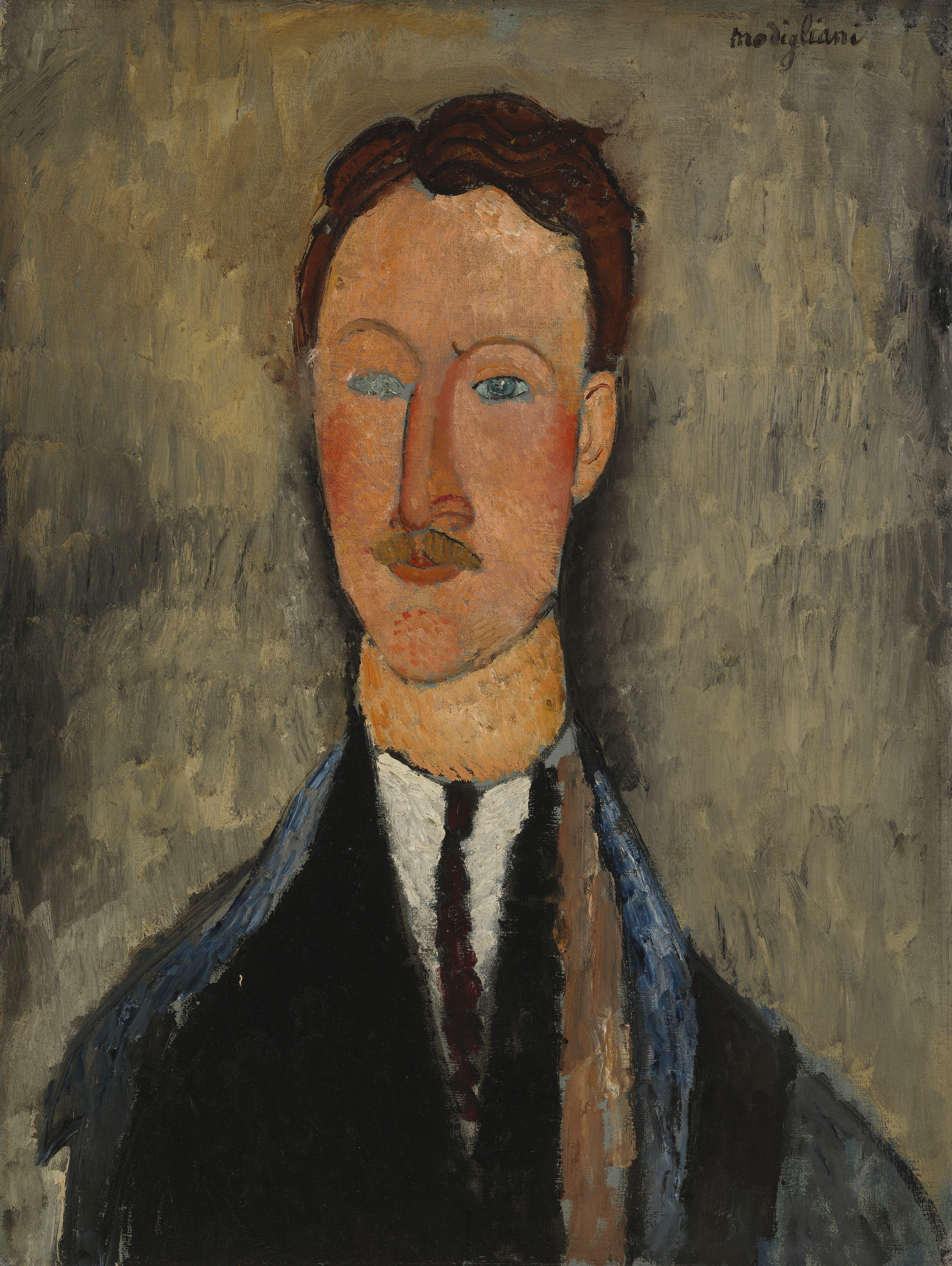
Amedeo Modigliani, Léopold Survage, 1918

At a young age, Survage was directed to enter the piano factory operated by his Finnish father. He learned to play the piano, then completed a commercial diploma in 1897. After a severe illness at the age of 22, Survage rethought his career and entered the Moscow School of Painting, Sculpture and Architecture. Introduced to the modern movement through the collections of Sergei Shchukin and Ivan Morozov, he cast his lot with the Russian avant-garde and, by 1906, was loosely affiliated with the circle of the magazine Zolotoye runo (Golden fleece—see also Maximilian Voloshin). He met Alexander Archipenko, exhibiting with him in the company of David Burlyuk, Vladimir Burlyuk, Mikhail Larionov and Natalia Goncharova. With Hélène Moniuschko, later his wife, he travelled to Western Europe, visiting Paris in July 1908. The couple eventually settled in Paris where Survage worked as a piano tuner and briefly attended the short-lived school run by Henri Matisse. He exhibited with the Jack of Diamonds group in Moscow in 1910 and first showed his work in France—at the urging of Archipenko—in the Salon d'Automne of 1911.

In 1913, Survage produced abstract compositions using color and movement to evoke a type of musical sensation. Entitled Rythmes colorés, he planned to animate these illustrations by means of film to form "symphonies en couleur". He saw these abstract images as flowing together, but he exhibited the ink wash drawings separately at the Salon d'Automne in 1913 and Salon des Indépendants in 1914. Articles on these works were published by Guillaume Apollinaire (Paris-J., July 1914) and Survage himself (Soirées Paris, July–August 1914). In June 1914, in order to develop his idea, Survage unsuccessfully applied for a patent to Gaumont. Had he been able to raise the funds, he would have preceded Viking Eggeling and Hans Richter as the first to develop abstract films.

Beginning in 1917, Survage shared a studio—and a penchant for alcoholic excesses—with Amedeo Modigliani in Paris. Survage later moved to Nice and, over the next eight years, produced highly structured oils and works on paper linked together by a series of leitmotifs, repeating groups of symbolic elements—man, sea, building, flower, window, curtain, bird—as if they were protagonists in a series of moving images. The influence may have been Marc Chagall's, an artist well known for his insertions of floating couples, cows, roosters, and sundry Jewish iconography. By 1922, Survage had begun to move away from Cubism in favour of the neo-classical form. He was perhaps influenced by commissions for Serge Diaghilev's Ballets Russes, beginning with sets and costumes for Igor Stravinsky's opera buffa Mavra at the Paris Opéra in 1922. Although mainly a painter, he also produced stage, tapestry, and textile designs during this period (notably for the house of Chanel in 1933). Toward the end of the 1930s, as a result of his contact with André Masson, Survage became increasingly charmed by symbols and mysticism. The curvilinear forms that had previously dominated his compositions came, once again, under the control of geometric structure.

On 12 March 1963 Survage was named Officer of the Légion d'Honneur. He died on 31 October 1968 in Paris.

== Selected exhibitions ==
- 1968: Musée des beaux-arts, Lyon
- 1930: Museum of Modern Art, New York
- 1929: Knoedler Gallery, New York
- 1920: Galerie de L'Effort Moderne, Paris
- 1914: Salon des Indépendants, Paris
- 1913: Salon d'Automne, Paris

== Selected collections ==
- Musée national d'art moderne Georges Pompidou, Paris
- Bezalel Museum, Jerusalem
- Tretyakov Gallery, Moscow
- Musée des beaux-arts, Lyon
- Musée du Petit Palais, Geneva
- Musée national d'art moderne, Paris
- San Francisco Museum of Modern Art
- Museum of Modern Art, New York
- National Museum of Arts, Moscow
- National Museum, Athens

== Literature ==
- Artistes russes de l'École de Paris [exhibition catalogue]. Geneva: Musée d'art moderne, 1989.
- Léopold Survage [exhibition catalogue]. Lyon: Musée des beaux-arts, 1968.
- Léopold Survage: aquarelles, peintures, dessins [retrospective exhibition]. Nice: Direction des musées de Nice, 1975.
- Les lumières de Léopold Survage: oeuvres, 1910-1932 [exhibition catalogue]. Aix-en-Provence: Galerie d'art du Conseil général des Bouches-du-Rhône, 2001.
- Putnam, Samuel. The Glistening Bridge: Léopold Survage and the Spatial Problem in Painting. New York: Covici-Friede, 1929. (online)
- Seyrès, Hélène (ed.). Écrits sur la peinture: Léopold Survage. Paris: L'Archipel, 1992.
- Warnod, Jeanine. Survage. Brussels: A. de Rache, 1983.
