= 31st Lambda Literary Awards =

2019 literary awards ceremony

The 31st Lambda Literary Awards were held on June 3, 2019, to honour works of LGBT literature published in 2018. The list of nominees was released on March 7.

== Special awards ==
Category	Winner
Trustee Award	Alexander Chee
Visionary Award	Masha Gessen
Publishing Professional Award	Barbara Smith
Jeanne Córdova Prize for Lesbian/Queer Nonfiction	Karen Tongson
Judith A. Markowitz Emerging Writer Award	Hannah Ensor, Robert Fieseler

== Nominees and winners ==
Category	Winner	Nominated
Bisexual Fiction	Négar Djavadi, Disoriental (tr. Tina Kover)	Nathan Alling Long, The Origin of Doubt: Fifty Short Fictions; Katrina Carrasco, The Best Bad Things; Jennifer Natalya Fink, Bhopal Dance; Jude Lucens, Behind These Doors: Radical Proposals Book 1; Emily Strelow, The Wild Birds; J.E. Sumerau, Palmetto Rose; Lilah Suzanne, Jilted
Bisexual Nonfiction	Anthony Moll, Out of Step	Sophie Lucido Johnson, Many Love: A Memoir of Polyamory and Finding Love(s); Julietta Singh, No Archive Will Restore You
Bisexual Poetry	Duy Doan, We Play a Game	Fatimah Asghar, If They Come for Us; Frances Donovan, Mad Quick Hand of the Seashore: Love Poems; Marcelo Hernandez Castillo, Cenzontle; Xemiyulu Manibusan Tapepechul, My Woman Card Is Anti-Native & Other Two-Spirit Truths
Gay Fiction	Joshua Whitehead, Jonny Appleseed	David Jackson Ambrose, State of the Nation; Joseph Cassara, The House of Impossible Beauties; Martin Duberman, Luminous Traitor: The Just and Daring Life of Roger Casement; John R. Gordon, Drapetomania, or the Narrative of Cyrus Tyler and Abednego Tyler; Uzodinma Iweala, Speak No Evil; Édouard Louis, History of Violence; Patrick Nathan, Some Hell
Gay Memoir/Biography	Darnell L. Moore, No Ashes in the Fire: Coming of Age Black and Free in America	Alexander Chee, How to Write an Autobiographical Novel; Lillian Faderman, Harvey Milk: His Lives and Death; Casey Gerald, There Will Be No Miracles Here; DeRay Mckesson, On the Other Side of Freedom: The Case for Hope; Jeffrey C. Stewart, The New Negro: The Life of Alain Locke; Jerry Torre and Tony Maietta, The Marble Faun of Grey Gardens: A Memoir of the Beales, the Maysles Brothers and Jacqueline Kennedy; Edmund White, The Unpunished Vice: A Life of Reading
Gay Mystery	Marshall Thornton, Late Fees	John Copenhaver, Dodging and Burning; Bud Gundy, Somewhere Over Lorain Road; Joseph Olshan, Black Diamond Fall; David S. Pederson, Death Checks In; Neil S. Plakcy, Survival Is a Dying Art; Jeffrey Round, The God Game; Marshall Thornton, Boystown 11: Heart’s Desire
Gay Poetry	Justin Phillip Read, Indecency	Kazim Ali, Inquisition; Jonah Mixon-Webster, Stereo(TYPE); Brane Mozetič, Unfinished Sketches of a Revolution (tr. Barbara Jursa); Hieu Minh Nguyen, Not Here; Carl Phillips, Wild Is the Wind; Tommy Pico, Junk; Aldrin Valdez, ESL or You Weren’t Here
Gay Romance	S. C. Wynne, Crashing Upwards	Melanie Hansen, Point of Contact; Reesa Herberth and Michelle Moore, Detour; Jenny Holiday, Undue Influence: A Persuasion Retelling; Kris Jacen, Learn with Me; Christina Lee and Riley Hart, Of Sunlight and Stardust; Angela McCallister, The CEO’s Christmas Manny; Kayleigh Sky, No Luck
Lesbian Fiction	Larissa Lai, The Tiger Flu	Lucy Jane Bledsoe, The Evolution of Love; Nona Caspers, The Fifth Woman; Amber Dawn, Sodom Road Exit; Genevieve Hudson, Pretend We Live Here; Trifonia Melibea Obono, La Bastarda (tr. Lawrence Schimel); Sarah Schulman, Maggie Terry; Krystal A. Smith, Two Moons
Lesbian Memoir/Biography	Zahra Patterson, Chronology	Marusya Bociurkiw, Food Was Her Country: The Memoir of a Queer Daughter; Barrie Jean Borich, Apocalypse, Darling; Sandra Gail Lambert, A Certain Loneliness; Esther Newton, My Butch Career; Lindsay Nixon, nîtisânak; Julia Van Haaften, Berenice Abbott: A Life in Photography; Sarah Viren, MINE
Lesbian Mystery	Claire O'Dell, A Study in Honor	Joseph Fink, Alice Isn't Dead; Charlotte Greene, Gnarled Hollow; Ellen Hart, A Whisper of Bones; Gerri Hill, The Locket; Catherine Maiorisi, A Matter of Blood; A. Rose Mathieu, Secrets of the Last Castle; Linda J. Wright, Stolen
Lesbian Poetry	Nina Puro, Each Tree Could Hold a Noose or a House	Etel Adnan, Surge; Kristin Chang, Past Lives; T. Liem, Obits.; Jane Miller, Who Is Trixie the Trasher? And Other Questions; Eileen Myles, Evolution; Emilia Nielsen, Body Work; Marylyn Tan, Gaze Back
Lesbian Romance	Ann McMan, Beowulf for Cretins	Jenny Frame, Charming the Vicar; Jae, Just for Show; Lola Keeley, The Music and the Mirror; Aurora Rey, Autumn’s Light; Rachel Spangler, In Development; Sheri Lewis Wohl, The Talebearer; Erin Zak, Breaking Down Her Walls
LGBTQ Anthology	The Other Foundation, As You Like It: The Gerald Kraak Anthology, Volume II [fiction] Roxane Gay, Not That Bad: Dispatches from Rape Culture [nonfiction]	Lexie Bean, Written on the Body: Letters from Trans and Non-Binary Survivors of Sexual Assault and Domestic Violence; Peter Dickinson, C. E. Gatchalian, Kathleen Oliver and Dalbir Singh, Q2Q: Queer Canadian Performance Texts; Sadie Epstein-Fine and Makeda Zook, Spawning Generations: Rants and Reflections on Growing Up with LGBTQ Parents; Miah Jefra and Chad Koch, Foglifter Volume 3, Issue 1; Phyll Opoku-Gyimah, Rikki Beadle-Blair and John R. Gordon, Sista!: An Anthology of Writing By and About Same Gender Loving Women of African/Caribbean Descent with a UK Connection; Taneka Stotts and Sfé R. Monster, Beyond II: The Queer Post-Apocalyptic & Urban Fantasy Comic Anthology
LGBTQ Children's/Young Adult	Kacen Callender, Hurricane Child	Mark Oshiro, Anger Is a Gift; Angelo Surmelis, The Dangerous Art of Blending In; Adib Khorram, Darius the Great Is Not Okay; Ashley Herring Blake, Girl Made of Stars; Elizabeth Acevedo, The Poet X; Claire Legrand, Sawkill Girls; Kacen Callender, This Is Kind of an Epic Love Story
LGBTQ Drama	Mashuq Mushtaq Deen, Draw the Circle	Daniel Alexander Jones, Black Light; Jen Silverman, Collective Rage: A Play in Five Betties; Miranda Rose Hall, Plot Points in Our Sexual Development; Erin Markey, Singlet
LGBTQ Erotica	Blue Delliquanti and Kazimir Lee, Miles & Honesty in SCFSX!	Sacchi Green, Best Lesbian Erotica of the Year, Volume 3; Niki Smith, Crossplay; Matthew Bright, Gents: Steamy Stories from the Age of Steam; Tom Cardamone, The Lurid Sea
LGBTQ Graphic Novel	Tommi Parrish, The Lie and How We Told It	Mark Russell, Sean Parsons, Mark Morales, Howard Porter, Mike Feehan, Exit, Stage Left!: The Snagglepuss Chronicles; Paige Braddock, Love Letters to Jane’s World; Tillie Walden, On a Sunbeam; Eric Kostiuk Williams, Our Wretched Town Hall; Michelle Perez and Remy Boydell, The Pervert; Steve MacIsaac, Unpacking; Jeanne Thornton and Tara Madison Avery, We’re Still Here: An All-Trans Comics Anthology
LGBTQ Nonfiction	Imani Perry, Looking for Lorraine: The Radiant and Radical Life of Lorraine Hansberry	Ria Brodell, Butch Heroes; Charlene A. Carruthers, Unapologetic: A Black, Queer, and Feminist Mandate for Radical Movements; Avery Cassell, Resistance: The LGBT Fight Against Fascism in WWII; Piper J. Daniels, Ladies Lazarus; Martin Duberman, Has the Gay Movement Failed?; Jim Elledge, The Boys of Fairy Town: Sodomites, Female Impersonators, Third-Sexers, Pansies, Queers, and Sex Morons in Chicago’s First Century; C. J. Janovy, No Place Like Home: Lessons in Activism from LGBT Kansas
LGBTQ Science Fiction/Fantasy/Horror	Isaac R. Fellman, The Breath of the Sun	Margaret Killjoy, The Barrow Will Send What It May; J. Y. Yang, The Descent of Monsters; Sonya Taaffe, Forget the Sleepless Shores; Aliette de Bodard, In the Vanishers’ Palace; Clay AD, Metabolize, If Able; Fletcher DeLancey, Resilience; C. L. Polk, Witchmark
LGBTQ Studies	William T. Hoston, Toxic Silence: Race, Black Gender Identity, and Addressing the Violence Against Black Transgender Women in Houston	E. Patrick Johnson, Black. Queer. Southern. Women.: An Oral History; Lyndon K. Gill, Erotic Islands: Art and Activism in the Queer Caribbean; Myrl Beam, Gay, Inc.: The Nonprofitization of Queer Politics; Keridwen N. Luis, Herlands: Exploring the Women’s Land Movement in the United States; Andrew Billings and Leigh Moscowitz, Media and the Coming Out of Gay Male Athletes in American Team Sports; T. Jackie Cuevas, Post-Borderlandia: Chicana Literature and Gender Variant Critique; Anne Balay, Semi Queer: Inside the World of Gay, Trans, and Black Truck Drivers
Transgender Fiction	Casey Plett, Little Fish	Mattilda Bernstein Sycamore, Sketchtasy; Akwaeke Emezi, Freshwater; Calvin Gimpelevich, Invasions; Jordy Rosenberg, Confessions of the Fox
Transgender Nonfiction	Jules Gill-Peterson, Histories of the Transgender Child	Aren Z. Aizura, Mobile Subjects: Transnational Imaginaries of Gender Reassignment; Joy Ladin, The Soul of the Stranger: Reading God and Torah from a Transgender Perspective; Thomas Page McBee, Amateur: A True Story About What Makes a Man; Vivek Shraya, I’m Afraid of Men
Transgender Poetry	Raquel Salas Rivera, Lo Terciario / The Tertiary	Gwen Benaway, Holy Wild; Luna Merbruja, Heal Your Love; Sara Mithra, If the Color Is Fugitive; Ely Shipley, Some Animal
