= Sports analyst =

Sportscaster, color commentator and/or journalist reporting on sports

A sports analyst is a person looking through technical, tactical, physiological, and psychological performance metrics working with the sports coach and sports science team to improve athlete performance. They will often use video motion analysis to help with data collection. Sports commentators or journalists also analyze elements of sports performance, for media companies to use for tactical analysis.

A sports analyst may perform different jobs within the field and may even hold more than one position at once. A sports journalist reports to the public in the form of writing and includes information about sporting topics, events, and competitions. A sports commentator and sportscaster give play-by-play details of a specific sporting event and game. They also relay information necessary to understand the context of that specific sport. Notable sports commentators include Joe Buck, Brent Musburger, and Max Kellerman.

Sports analysts are typically former athletes and coaches from their respective sports. Sometimes, a sports analyst will cover a sport, even though they have not played that sport previously. An example is Brad Daugherty, who played professional basketball but covers NASCAR racing.

== History ==
=== Early 1800s to 1900s: Origins ===
Up until the early 1800s, sports journalism was reserved for the social elite. The high price of newspapers made it so only those of high economic status could afford it. Due to the invention of the penny press and the adoption of mass production throughout the United States, newspapers became more affordable. With newspapers more widely accessible, the demand for sports journalism quickly began to rise.

Henry Chadwick is one of the earliest recorded sports analysts. Chadwick is acknowledged for his many contributions to baseball statistics. He created box scores in addition to the statistics of batting average and earned run average (ERA).

Before his invention, sports columnists resorted to tallying runs scored. Chadwick’s baseball box score was based on the cricket scorecard. It debuted in an issue of the Clipper in 1859. The scorecard was a 9x9 grid. Chadwick had numbers representing defensive positions and this method of scorekeeping is present to this day.

=== 20th century: Rise of sports coverage ===
During the 1900s, baseball became the national pastime of the United States. Media coverage of sports rapidly increased, specifically in New York. The first newspapers with a reoccurring sports section and a dedicated sports department were the New York Herald and The New York respectively.

In the mid to late 1800s, newspapers only dedicated 0.4 percent of their page to sports or sports-related topics. A little over a half-century later, that percentage rose to 20 percent.

Advancements in print also contributed to the coverage of sports. Sports Illustrated was founded in 1954. Sports Illustrated’s release schedule allowed the writers to study the games thoroughly and host detailed interviews with players, coaches, and sports analysts.

=== Modern day ===
Technological advancements, such as the television and the internet, helped change the coverage of sports to statistical analysis instead of play-by-plays and general summaries. Player interviews also became more common.

== Education ==
A sports analyst's education may include a Bachelor of Journalism or sport communication and master's programs with concentrations in sports reporting. Common courses include news reporting, media ethics, sports psychology, and magazine writing.

== Types ==
There are two types of sports analysts, those who are employed by media companies, and other sports broadcast channels, and those who are hired by teams. The analysts on broadcast channels work with automated data feeds and use manual data entry to ensure the delivery of accurate, timely, and insightful sports data. Sports data analysts also are responsible for helping turn stats into digestible storylines. They must be able to recognize statistical events that help explain why a team won or lost.

The sports analysts who are hired by sports teams to help enhance performance collect and analyze training data from individual athletes. They then develop efficient training programs aimed at improving their performance. During a game or competition, a sports analyst will be assisting a coach with the proper decisions to make for the team’s best outcome.

== Salary ==
The salary of a sports analyst has a very large margin. The national average sat at $61,673 annually as of March 2023. Some sports analysts make as little as $21,000 a year while some make as much as $126,000 per year depending on their level and recognition.

Can the text below be removed or replaced? This is not about the US in general.

The number of sports analyst jobs is predicted by the Bureau of Labor Statistics to decrease by 9% between 2014 and 2024.

== See also ==
- Sports commentator
- List of sports announcers
- Sports analytics
- Sports journalism
- Sports radio
- Sports television
- Sports broadcasting
