= Naught (album) =

- Album cover art by Crab Scrambly

Studio album by Stolen Babies
- Released: October 16, 2012
- Recorded: The Wilderness, Drum Channel Studios, The Hovel, Polymorph Recording, The Lower Studio
- Genres: Experimental rock, dance-rock, progressive metal, experimental metal
- Length: 41:37
- Label: No Comment Records
- Producers: Ulrich Wild, Michael Iago Mellender, Stolen Babies

Stolen Babies chronology
There Be Squabbles Ahead (2006)	Naught (2012)

Professional ratings
Review scores
Source	Rating
Bloody Disgusting	favorable
Electronic Gaming Monthly	9/10 stars
Exclaim.ca	favorable

Naught is the second full-length album by Stolen Babies. Named by Rani Sharone, bassist for Stolen Babies, Naught represents hopelessness: all for naught. This album is darker than the prior album, There Be Squabbles Ahead. Many of the songs on Naught hit close to home for many of the members of Stolen Babies, and is a representation of their experiences at that time. The album was released on September 18, 2012, in digital download format and on October 16, 2012, in CD format through No Comment Records. On September 17, 2012, the album was made available for streaming on SoundCloud and Shockya.com. Naught was voted No. 1 in Revolver's "Album of the Week" readers poll on October 22, 2012 and No. 7 in The Village Voice Blog's "Ten Best Metal Albums of 2012" by Linda Leseman.

== Track listing ==
Naught album track listing adapted from Allmusic.

No.	Title	Writer(s)	Length
1.	"Never Come Back"	Dominique Lenore Persi, Rani Sharone	2:56
2.	"Splatter"	Dominique Lenore Persi, Rani Sharone	3:14
3.	"Second Sleep"	Dominique Lenore Persi, Rani Sharone	3:34
4.	"Behind The Days"	Dominique Lenore Persi, Rani Sharone	1:41
5.	"Mousefood"	Dominique Lenore Persi, Rani Sharone	2:41
6.	"Don't Know"	Dominique Lenore Persi, Rani Sharone	3:41
7.	"I Woke Up"	Dominique Lenore Persi, Michael Mellender, Rani Sharone	2:34
8.	"Swimming Hole"	Dominique Lenore Persi, Rani Sharone	3:29
9.	"Dried Moat"	Dominique Lenore Persi, Rani Sharone	3:42
10.	"Prankster"	Dominique Lenore Persi, Rani Sharone	3:46
11.	"Birthday Song"	Dominique Lenore Persi, Michael Mellender	2:30
12.	"Civil Disguise"	Dominique Lenore Persi, Rani Sharone	3:12
13.	"Grubbery (burnt to a crisp)"	Dominique Lenore Persi, Rani Sharone	4:37
Total length:			41:37

== Personnel ==
Naught album personnel adapted from the CD liner notes and Allmusic.

Stolen Babies

- Dominique Lenore Persi – lead vocals, accordion, piano (track 7), keyboards (11)
- Rani Sharone – bass, guitars, vocals, upright bass (tracks 7, 13), mandolin (8), banjo (8, 13), toy piano (8), programming, percussion
- Gil Sharone – drums, percussion
- Ben Rico – keyboards, percussion, vocals

Additional musicians

- Michael Iago Mellender – additional background vocals (tracks 4, 7, 11) trumpet (8) guitar & keyboards (7, 11) toy piano & typewriter banjo (7)
- Darling Freakhead – additional background vocals & guitar (track 11)
- Meredith Yayanos – violin (track 4)
- Brian Walsh – clarinet (tracks 4,8) bass clarinet (8)
- Patrick Surace – bugle
- Marz Richards -background vocals

Production

- Ulrich Wild – production, mixing, engineer
- Raider – mixing and recording assistant
- Stolen Babies – production (tracks 4, 7, 11, 13)
- Michael Iago Mellender – production (tracks 7, 11)
- Kevin Majorino – mixing, engineer, mastering at AMP Studios
