= Margaret Killjoy =

American author and musician

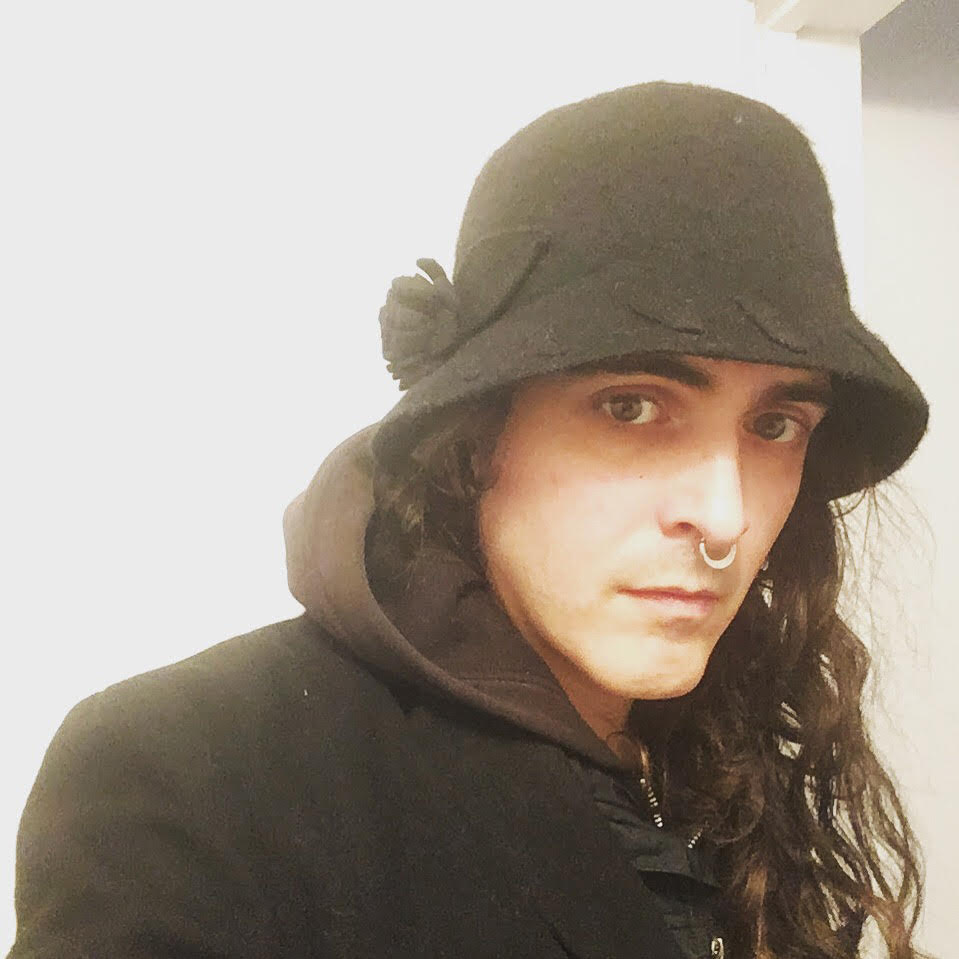
- Occupations: Author; musician; podcaster
- Writing career
- Genres: Fantasy; Folk horror; Young adult literature
- Notable work: Danielle Cain (series) The Sapling Cage
- Musical career
- Genres: Black metal; doom metal; electronica; neofolk
- Occupations: Singer; songwriter; instrumentalist
- Website: birdsbeforethestorm.net

Margaret Killjoy is an American author, musician, and podcast host. She is best known for her speculative fiction in the fantasy and folk horror genres, in particular for her three-book Danielle Cain series. Killjoy is involved in several musical projects across genres, including black metal, neofolk, and electronica. She founded the feminist black metal band Feminazgûl in 2018. She is a host of the anarchist and left wing history podcast Cool People Who Did Cool Stuff, and the survival and community preparedness podcast Live Like The World is Dying.

== Background and life ==
Killjoy is an anarchist, feminist, and anti-fascist. She is a transgender woman. Killjoy spent much of her early adult life as a "squatter and wanderer", then in the late 2010s began building a small cabin in the Appalachian Mountains on an anarchist land project.

== Career ==
=== Writing ===
Killjoy's fiction writing includes queer, anarchist fantasy and folk horror. Killjoy published What Lies Beneath the Clock Tower, a steampunk interactive novel, in 2011.

In 2017, Killjoy published the first of two books in the Danielle Cain series, which features a group of genderqueer, anarchist demon hunters in the American heartland. In the first novella, The Lamb Will Slaughter the Lion, the group is hunted by a demon that appears in the form of a stag. The second book in the series, The Barrow Will Send What It May, follows members of the same group as they run from the events of the first book. The Lamb Will Slaughter the Lion was nominated for a Shirley Jackson Award in 2017. The Barrow Will Send What It May was nominated in the 31st Lambda Literary Awards for the Lambda Literary Award for Speculative Fiction. A fundraiser has been announced for the third book to come in the series, The Immortal Choir Holds Every Voice.

Killjoy contributed the short story "We Won't Be Here Tomorrow" to A Punk Rock Future, a 2019 anthology of speculative science fiction and fantasy. In 2024, she published The Sapling Cage, the first book of a new medieval fantasy trilogy. The novel was shortlisted for the 2025 Ursula K. Le Guin Prize.

Killjoy has also edited and written non-fiction works, including the 2009 book Mythmakers & Lawbreakers: Anarchist Writers on Fiction (AK Press), a collection of interviews with anarchist authors of fiction including Ursula K. Le Guin and Alan Moore. In 2010, Killjoy published Take What You Need And Compost The Rest, in Dodgem Logic. She also was an editor of SteamPunk Magazine, which was in print from 2007 to 2016. In the magazine, Killjoy spoke about steampunk as a literary genre that challenges humanity's relationship with technology; she warned against technology separating humanity from its natural environment, which she believed to sacrifice diversity for efficiency.

=== Music ===
Killjoy founded the feminist black metal band Feminazgûl in 2018. She released the band's first EP, The Age of Men Is Over, as a solo project the same year. Joined by Laura Beach as lead vocalist and Meredith Yayanos as violinist and theremin player, the band released its first full-length album, No Dawn for Men, in 2020.

Killjoy is involved in several other musical projects: neofolk Alsarath, blackened doom Vulgarite, and electronica Nomadic War Machine.

=== Podcasting ===
Killjoy hosts the anarchist survivalist podcast Live Like the World Is Dying. She launched her history podcast Cool People Who Did Cool Stuff, described as highlighting "complex stories of resistance that offer lessons and inspiration for us today," on May 2, 2022 at IHeartRadio.

== Written works ==
=== Fiction ===
- What Lies Beneath the Clock Tower (2011)
- The Super-Happy Anarcho Fun Book (2013)
- A Country of Ghosts (2014)
- Everything that Isn’t Winter (2016)
- Into the Gray (2018)
- The Lamb Will Slaughter the Lion (Danielle Cain series #1, 2017)
- The Barrow Will Send What It May (Danielle Cain series #2, 2018)
- We Won't Be Here Tomorrow (2022)
- Escape from Incel Island (2023)
- The Sapling Cage (Daughters of the Empty Throne trilogy #1, 2024)
- The Immortal Choir Holds Every Voice (Danielle Cain series #3, 2025)

=== Non-fiction ===
- Mythmakers & Lawbreakers: Anarchists Writers on Fiction, editor (2009)
- Take What You Need And Compost The Rest: an introduction to post-civilized theory (2010)
- A Steampunk's Guide to the Apocalypse (2012)
- We Are Many: Reflections on Movement Strategy from Occupation to Liberation, editor (2012)
- Take What You Need and Compost the Rest: An Anarchist Introduction to Post-Civilization Theory (2013)

== Discography ==
=== Alsarath ===
- Come to Daggers (2020)

=== Feminazgûl ===
- The Age of Men Is Over (EP, 2018)
- No Dawn for Men (2020)

=== Nomadic War Machine ===
- I have a gun. Give me all the money in the register. (2010)
- Always /// Forever (2018)
- Every Breath Our Last (2019)
- Creatures of the Wind (2020)
- Are We Not Monsters (2020)

=== Vulgarite ===
- Fear Not the Dark Nor the Sun's Return (2020)
