= Andrew C. Billings =

American academic

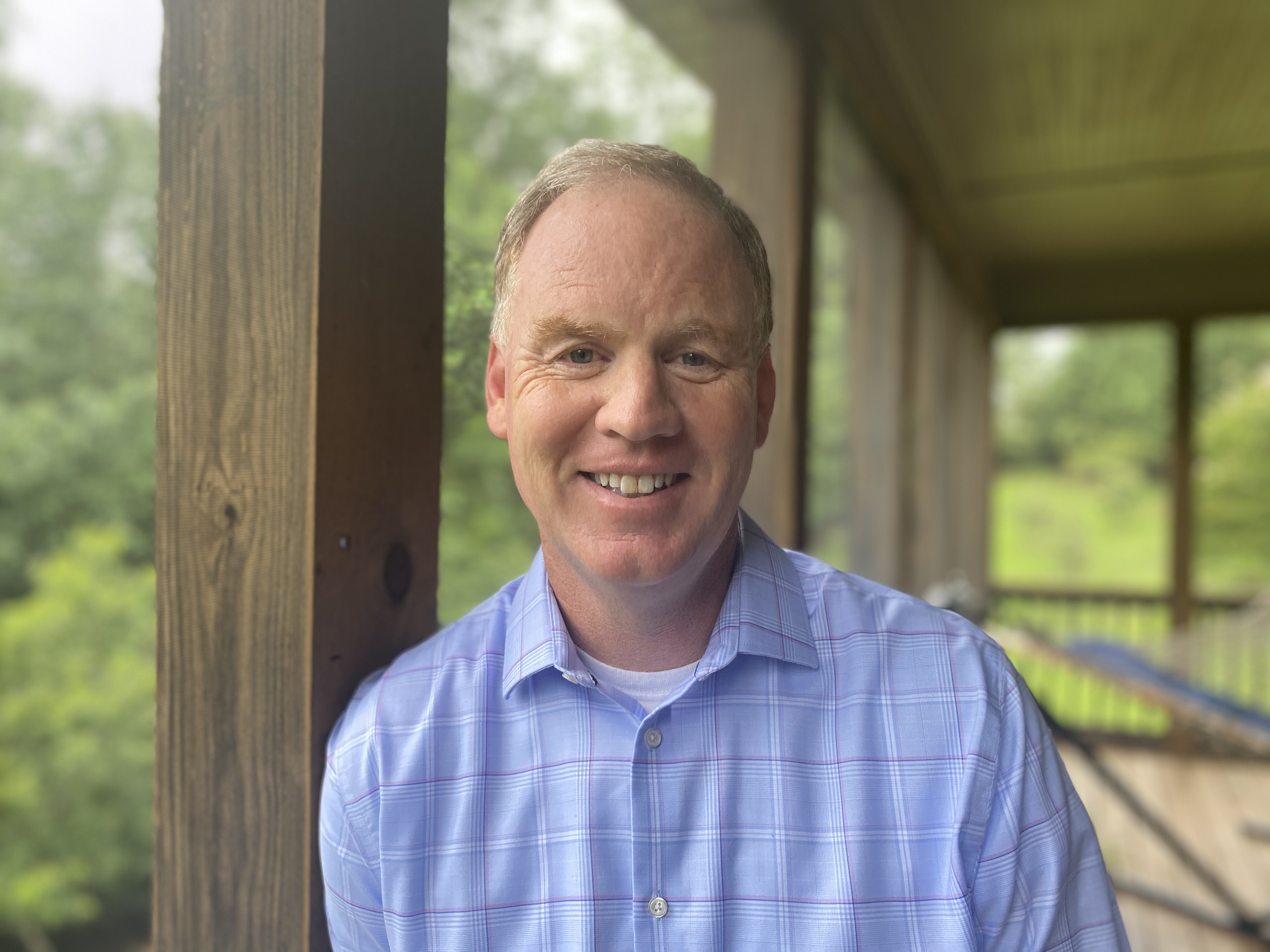
Dr. Andrew C. Billings

Andrew C. Billings is a professor and the Ronald Reagan Chair of Broadcasting in the Department of Journalism and Creative Media at The University of Alabama. He is the Editor-in-Chief for the journal Communication & Sport and works with the University of Alabama think tank, the Beyond Sports Initiative. His research primarily focuses on the study of Sport Communication. He was the founding chair of both the Communication and Sport Division of the National Communication Association and the Sport Communication Interest Group of the International Communication Association. A former Visiting Chair of Olympism at the Autonomous University of Barcelona, Billings is a Fellow of the International Communication Association and won the Broadcast Education Association's Lifetime Achievement in Scholarship Award in 2025.

His work has been cited over 13,000 times and, between his journal articles and book projects, he is the most published sports communication scholar in the world. His research often focuses on the intersection of sport, mass media, and how people interpret identity issues within sport when consuming sport content. He also focuses on elements surrounding spots contents, such as fantasy sport. Billings has won over 60 awards for his scholarship, including national and international awards from the National Communication Association, International Communication Association, Broadcast Education Association, and the Association for Education in Journalism and Mass Communication, and many book awards, which provides academic perspective to journalists on matters related to sport communication.

== Education ==
A graduate of Lakeland High School in Lagrange, Indiana, Billings received his PhD in Communication & Culture from Indiana University Bloomington in 1999.

== Research interests ==
Much of Billings' research focuses on various aspects of how American sports media covers and affects issues of gender, race, and identity. Two of his books, Olympic Media: Inside the Biggest Show on Television and Olympic Television: Broadcasting the biggest show on Earth analyze the production, content, and the effects of NBC's broadcast of the Olympic Games. In particular, he focuses on the topics of ethnicity, gender, and nationality, and how that is communicated to the public via the telecast. In 2009, Billings co-authored with Heather L. Hundley Examining Identity in Sports Media, focusing on how identity issues are communicated and shaped by sports media. More recent books have focused on a wider range of identity issues including Native American representations in sports (in his 2018 book with Jason Edward Black, Mascot Nation ) and the role of media in gay athlete coming out stories (in his 2018 book with Leigh Moscowitz, Media and the Coming Out of Gay Male Athletes in American Team Sports). A recent book with William Benoit, The Rise and Fall of Mass Communication, tackles sports along with all other forms of news and entertainment to advance axioms of media balkanization theory. His most recent book, Head Game: Mental Health in Sports Media, focuses on the role media can and should play in navigating athlete mental health disclosures.

== Selected publications ==
=== Books ===
Billings has authored 27 books. Notable texts include:

- Billings, A.C. (2008). Olympic media: Inside the biggest show on television. London: Routledge
- Billings, A.C, Angelini, J.R., & MacArthur, P.J. (2018). Olympic television: Broadcasting the biggest show on Earth. London: Routledge.
- Billings, A.C., & Black, J.E. (2018). Mascot nation: The controversy over Native American representations in sports. Champaign, IL: University of Illinois Press.
- Billings, A.C., & Moscowitz, L.M. (2018). Media and the coming out of gay male athletes in American team sports. New York: Peter Lang.
- Benoit, W.L., & Billings, A.C. (2020). The rise and fall of mass communication. New York: Peter Lang.
- Billings, A.C., & Parrott, S. (2023). Head game: Mental health in sports media. New York: Peter Lang.

=== Journal articles ===
Billings has approximately 310 published journal articles and book chapters. Notable early papers include:

- Eastman, S.T., & Billings, A.C. (1999). "Gender parity in the Olympics: Hyping women athletes, favoring men athletes." Journal of Sport and Social Issues. 23(2): pages 140–170.
- Eastman, S.T., & Billings, A.C. (2000). "Sportscasting and sports reporting: The Power of Gender Bias." Journal of Sport & Social Issues. 24(2): pages 192–213.
- Eastman, S.T., & Billings, A.C. (2001). "Biased voices of sports: Racial and gender stereotyping in college basketball announcing." Howard Journal of Communications. 12(4): pages 183–201.
- Billings, A.C., & Eastman, S.T. (2003). "Framing identities: Gender, ethnic, and national parity in network announcing of the 2002 Winter Olympics." Journal of Communication. 53(4): pages 569–586.
