= Danielle Cain =

American novella series

The Danielle Cain novels are a three-book series created by author and musician Margaret Killjoy. They concern the eponymous protagonist and her group of friends as they travel America's heartland in pursuit of magic, demons, and other supernatural events. The first novella, The Lamb Will Slaughter The Lion, was released in 2017 and was nominated for the Shirley Jackson Award. The second installment, The Barrow Will Send What It May, was released the following year and was nominated for the Lambda Literary Award. The Immortal Choir Holds Every Voice was published in 2025. The series has been praised for its portrayals of anarchism and its diverse cast of characters.

== Background ==
Killjoy is a self-proclaimed anarchist, feminist and anti-capitalist, all three being ideologies that bleed into her books. She claims that she simply set out to write a story that expresses what she believes, containing characters that she can see herself and her friends in, resulting in the Danielle Cain series.

== Plot ==
=== The Lamb Will Slaughter The Lion (2017) ===
The first book follows Danielle Cain, an anarchist who has spent her life travelling the US, as she tries to understand why her best friend, Clay, took his own life. Her search leads her to the fictional town of Freedom, Iowa - an abandoned town resurrected by anarchists where Clay had settled before his death. Here she meets his former friends - Vulture, Brynn, Thursday, and Doomsday - and discovers the darker side of the town; it's protected by a deer-like demon with three antlers known as Uliksi, a creature originally summoned to protect it from those who sought to harm its inhabitants and maintain peace in Freedom. However, on the same day that Danielle arrives, it murders one of its summoners. Driven by fear, curiosity, and determination to understand Clay's death, Danielle chooses to stay in town and help understand the reasoning behind Uliksi's change in behaviour and potentially save the town from his wrath. While unraveling the story behind Uliksi's summoning, and how it acts, Danielle finds herself becoming part of the group and growing especially close to Brynn, leading to her choosing to stay and defend them and the town when danger is imminent, and fleeing with them at the end of the novella.

=== The Barrow Will Send What It May (2018) ===
The second book sees Danielle and her friends on the run from the events of Lamb and heading towards Pendleton, Montana. After crashing their van on the way there, the group are picked up by a woman who casually mentions she was brought back from the dead - solidifying the group's decision to investigate. Once in Pendleton, they seek refuge in the town's library, managed by two like-minded anarchists - Heather and Vasilis - who also turn out to be connected to the mysterious resurrections around town, and former friends of Clay. They come into contact with a woman called Isola, who reveals she and her two friends were murdered as part of a ritual, and that she too had been resurrected. The story takes many twists and turns before the necromancer is revealed, and the group choose to leave Pendleton in search of more mysteries.

=== The Immortal Choir Holds Every Voice (2025) ===
The third covers Samhain night while Danielle and her friends are laying low in an Iowa forest. The veil between the worlds of the living and the dead are at their thinnest on Samhain, and as the sun sets the group begins to hear an ominous bellowing from the forest's depths. The group decide that remaining awake and keeping their campfire lit can likely keep the source of the noise away from them, regardless of whether or not it is supernatural. To keep one another awake, they begin to tell stories about magic, and the many forms that it can take.

== Characters ==
- Danielle Cain is the main protagonist of the series. She's a pale woman, who wears a military-style belt and uses a baton. Danielle frequently describes herself as both a punk and an anarchist, and has spent her life squatting and hitchhiking around America. She has a scar from a crowbar wound on her left shoulder and her right hand is soulless. She has an ankle tattoo of the ouroboros. Before his death, she considered Clay her best friend.
- Vulture is a former inhabitant of Freedom, Iowa where he lived with Brynn, Doomsday and Thursday. He is a heavily tattooed (the most notable being a goat's head on his chest) black transgender man, and was in a relationship with Kestrel. He frequently documents the group's adventures on his Instagram page, much to his friends' annoyance. He's the first person Danielle meets after arriving in Freedom.
- Brynn is a former inhabitant of Freedom, Iowa. She is a tall, muscular woman with a forehead tattoo, and a similar belt and baton to those owned by Danielle. She has a tattoo of Uliksi on her hand and is celibate. She is a tattoo artist, and has tattooed Thursday, Heather and Danielle.
- Thursday is a former inhabitant of Freedom, Iowa. He is a black man with a tattoo of Uliksi on the side of his neck, done by Brynn, and his own name tattooed across his knuckles. He is the long-term partner of Doomsday, and the two are known as 'The Days'. He took his name from the novel The Man Who Was Thursday. He has a tendency to assume the role of 'protector', especially when it comes to Doomsday, but considers himself a light-hearted, funny person when not under threat.
- Doomsday is a former inhabitant of Freedom, Iowa, where she fled after she murdered her husband in Alaska. She's a heavy-set white woman, with her own name tattooed across her knuckles. She is the long-term partner of Thursday, with whom she has a matching tattoo. Together, the pair consider themselves the responsible members of the group and tend to act in defence of their friends above all. She acted as the Innocent in the ritual to summon Uliksi, and was a pallbearer at Anchor's funeral.
- Vasilis is an inhabitant of Pendleton, and co-owner of the library. He is a white man with a thick, dark beard and a half-white moustache. He has a tattoo of a blue spade on his cheek. He is Greek, but has lived in Pendleton for twenty years. He is a well-studied magic user, despite not having a natural aptitude.
- Heather is an inhabitant of Pendleton, and co-owner of the library. She is a dark-haired woman with an undercut and a septum piercing. She has a simplified ouroboros tattoo on her arm, done by Brynn. She can sound out Greek but cannot speak it, a skill she learned to impress Vasilis, her partner.

== Reception ==
The novels have been received positively. Kirkus Reviews described Barrow as "an entertaining book filled with memorable characters who tread glibly through the realms of both the living and the dead". Publishers Weekly described Lamb as "full of suspense, intrigue, and a surprising amount of heart" as well as commending its concise nature and unique but human characters.
