= The Sapling Cage =

2024 novel by Margaret Killjoy

- Author: Margaret Killjoy
- Language: English
- Genre: Fantasy
- Publisher: Feminist Press
- Publication date: September 24, 2024
- Publication place: U.S.
- Pages: 352
- ISBN: 978-1-558-61331-7

The Sapling Cage is a 2024 fantasy novel by American writer Margaret Killjoy.

== Premise ==
Lorel grows up in a village where her best friend has been promised to the witches, a group that only takes girls. Everyone in the village sees Lorel as a boy, but she desperately wishes she were a girl and could join the witches, just as her friend would rather avoid the witches and become a knight. The friends trade places, and Lorel carefully hides their secret.

Rather than learning magic, Lorel and her peers learn to fight via weapons. The witches' focus is dominated by the colddead, a blight spreading through the land's forests. Knights and witches have always hated each other, but the witches face further danger when a duchess's armies spread rumors blaming the witches for the blight. The witches face increased persecution at the same time that the blight drains their magic, and Lorel's training is interrupted by fighting as the witches try to survive. Throughout this, Lorel spends a lot of time thinking about her own relationship to her gender and body, and remains distant from her peers while she tries to keep her body a secret. Lorel wants to help the witches fight but must grapple with her fear of being discovered and her desire to avoid killing.

== Creation ==
Killjoy read Tamora Pierce's Song of the Lioness books as a child, and the series had a profound influence on her. The protagonist, Alanna, disguises herself as a boy so she can train as a knight, but follows feminine gender expectations in other ways. Many queer readers saw partial representation of their childhood experiences in this story, but yearned for works with more direct representation of queer coming-of-age stories. Pierce reflected that she would write Alanna as genderfluid if she redid the series. These questions about queer representation in the story of Song of the Lioness inspired Killjoy's narrative in The Sapling Cage. Killjoy specifically wanted more media representation of the experiences of trans youth. Rather than portraying trans children as sure about their gender identity, she wanted media that reflected her own wandering journey of gender exploration.

Killjoy decided to invert the premise of Pierce's series by focusing on a youth who wants to become a witch but was assigned male at birth and thus must take on a disguise to join them. Additionally, the main character is trans but does not think of herself as a girl trapped in the body of a boy. Instead, her understanding of her gender evolves throughout the book along with her plans for the future. Killjoy based the protagonist on her own teenage experience, making her emotionally distant, rather than the common YA characterization of a highly emotional teenager.

The speculative fiction setting also allowed Killjoy to experiment with different political concepts by portraying the magical consequences of eating domesticated animals, the power structures of different societies, the multiple possible ways of performing magic, and varying degrees of acceptance of queerness. Many of these concepts were influenced by the research Killjoy had already done for her history podcast, Cool People Who Did Cool Stuff.

== Publication ==
Feminist Press published the book in September 2024 as the first volume in a trilogy, Daughters of the Empty Throne. Jackie Meloche narrated an audiobook version, released via Dreamscape Media the same month. The audiobook includes singing, chanting, and other sound effects.

Killjoy finished the original manuscript for The Sapling Cage in 2017, but did not find a publisher for the work for several years. She said that her book's unusual variations on YA standards made it harder to find a fit. The book was eventually marketed as a coming-of-age novel, and not specifically YA.

== Reception ==
The Sapling Cage won the 2024 Transfeminine Review Reader's Choice award in Outstanding Fantasy. It was also shortlisted with distinction for the overall category of Best Transfeminine Fiction.

Foreword gave the novel a starred review, with Jeana Jorgensen praising the depth of the story's characterizations and world-building. Publishers Weekly called the book a high fantasy with gender-bending, praising the characterization of the witches and their culture, but finding it hard to connect with the protagonist's inner emotions. Amal El-Mohtar, for The New York Times, praised the beauty of the book and its portrayal of relationships. Kirkus also noted the book's focus on relationships and quiet tone, calling the book "almost whimsical". Charlie Jane Anders praised the novel for The Washington Post, stating that simple first-person descriptions contrast with complicated underlying themes and a "subtle narrative that handles gender and identity with unusual grace".

Emily Price, for Paste Magazine, and Alex Brown, for Locus, enjoyed the book's fast-paced and entertaining plot and deeply-developed setting. Both reviewers disliked the book's choice to tell, rather than show, many events. Price thought that character personalities were underdeveloped, while Brown wanted the plot to feel more urgent, with higher-stakes action. Roseanna Pendlebury, for the Ancillary Review of Books, deemed the novel a fresh approach to fantasy that deeply dwelt on its protagonist's journey of self-understanding, which Pendlebury found compelling and challenging. Pendlebury appreciated the depth of the protagonist and setting, but found some descriptions jarring.

The novel was shortlisted for the 2025 Ursula K. Le Guin Prize in Fiction.

=== Audiobook ===
For Library Journal, Matthew Galloway praised Jackie Meloche's narration of the audiobook, especially for Meloche's characterization of Lorel. Booklist's Alex Richey appreciated Meloche's range of voices, from cranky witches to expression of Lorel's excitement at her changed life.
