= Comic Book Tattoo =

American anthology graphic novel

- Comic Book Tattoo cover. Art by Jason Levesque.
- Page count: 480 pages
- Publisher: Image Comics

Creative team
- Writers: Various
- Artists: Various
- Colourists: Various
- Editors: Rantz A. Hoseley

Original publication
- Date of publication: July 2008
- Language: English
- ISBN: 1-58-240964-1

Comic Book Tattoo is an Eisner and Harvey Award–winning anthology graphic novel made up of fifty-one stories, each based on or inspired by a song by American singer-songwriter Tori Amos, published by Image Comics in 2008. Rantz Hoseley, longtime friend of Amos, served as the book's editor. Together, Hoseley and Amos gathered eighty different artists to collaborate on the book. Comic Book Tattoo includes an introduction by another longtime friend of Amos, Neil Gaiman, creator of The Sandman series.

== Background ==
From the start, it was decided that Comic Book Tattoo would not contain comic book versions of music videos for Amos's songs, nor illustrations created from literal interpretations of Amos's lyrics. Of her role in the project, editor Hoseley said, "It was very important to [Amos] that she see how the different creators were treating 'her girls' (the songs), but at the same time, not tying the creator's hands or make them feel restricted in any way and making sure that they felt the freedom to tell the kind of story that they felt strongly about." When approached to contribute to the project, the graphic artists were asked to create a story that reflects that which the songs make them feel.

About the finished collection, Amos said, "I have been surprised, excited and pleasantly shocked by these comics that are extensions of the songs that I have loved and therefore welcome these amazing stories of pictures and words because they are uncompromisingly inspiring. It shows you thought is a powerful, formidable essence and can have a breathtaking domino effect."

The title of the book comes from a lyric in Amos' song "Flying Dutchman".

== Stories ==
Song	Album	Artist(s)
Flying Dutchman	Little Earthquakes*	David Mack
Bouncing off Clouds	American Doll Posse	Josh Hechinger, Matthew Humphreys
Girl	Little Earthquakes	Jonathan Tsuei, Eric Canete
Merman	From the Choirgirl Hotel*	Jason Horn, Dean Trippe
Take to the Sky	Little Earthquakes*	Sara Ryan, Jonathan Case
Mr. Zebra	Boys for Pele	Rantz A. Hoseley, James Stokoe
Little Earthquakes	Little Earthquakes	Tristan Crane, Atticus Wolrab
Marianne	Boys for Pele	Kako
Crazy	Scarlet's Walk	Nikki Cook
Programmable Soda	American Doll Posse	Drew Bell, Kevin Mellon, Mark Sweeney (C)
Toast	The Beekeeper	Jeff Carroll, Mike May
Jackie's Strength	From the Choirgirl Hotel	Jeremy Haun, Amber Stone (C)
Little Amsterdam	Boys for Pele	Leif Jones
Here. In My Head	Little Earthquakes*	Elizabeth Genco, Carla Speed McNeil, Mark Sweeney (C)
Suede	To Venus and Back	Kelly Sue DeConnick, Andy Macdonald, Nick Filardi(C), Kristyn Ferretti (L)
Sugar	Little Earthquakes*	Cat Mihos, Andre Szymanowicz, Gabe Bautista (C), Kristyn Ferretti (L)
Teenage Hustling	American Doll Posse	C. B. Cebulski, Ethan Young, Joey Weltjens & Lee Duhig For Guru Efx (C)
Father Lucifer	Boys for Pele	Omaha Perez
Snow Cherries From France	Tales of a Librarian	Irma Page, Mark Buckingham
The Waitress	Under the Pink	Rantz A. Hoseley, Ming Doyle, Mark Sweeney (C), Kristyn Ferretti (L)
Caught a Lite Sneeze	Boys for Pele	Mike Maihack
Winter	Little Earthquakes	John Ney Rieber, Ryan Kelly, Kristyn Ferretti (L)
Baker Baker	Under the Pink	Alice Hunt, Trudy Cooper
1000 Oceans	To Venus and Back	Jonathan Hickman
Space Dog	Under the Pink	Matthew S. Armstrong
The Beekeeper	The Beekeeper	Neil Kleid, Christopher Mitten, Kristyn Ferretti (L)
Siren	Great Expectations Soundtrack	Stephanie Leong, Sonia Leong
Iieee	From the Choirgirl Hotel	Peov
Silent All These Years	Little Earthquakes	Kelly Sue Deconnick, Laurenn McCubbin
Leather	Little Earthquakes	John Bivens
Gold Dust	Scarlet's Walk	Hope Larson
Precious Things	Little Earthquakes	Emma Vieceli, Faye Yong (C)
Glory Of The '80s	To Venus and Back	Chris Arrant, Star St.Germain
Honey	Under the Pink*	Mike Dringenberg
Crucify	Little Earthquakes	Paul Maybury
God	Under the Pink	Jim Bricker, Craig Taillefer
Pandora's Aquarium	From the Choirgirl Hotel	Dame Darcy
Scarlet's Walk	Scarlet's Walk	G. Willow Wilson, Steve Sampson
Beauty Of Speed	American Doll Posse	Neal Shaffer, Daniel Krall
I Can't See New York	Scarlet's Walk	Adisakdi Tantimedh, Ken Meyer Jr.
Upside Down	Little Earthquakes*	Mark Sable, Salgood Sam
Northern Lad	From the Choirgirl Hotel	Tom Williams
Roosterspur Bridge	American Doll Posse	James A. Owen
Cornflake Girl	Under the Pink	Seth Peck, Daniel Heard
Pirates	Y Kant Tori Read	Ivan Brandon, Callum Alexander Watt
Hey Jupiter	Boys for Pele	Leah Moore & John Reppion, Pia Guerra, Mark Sweeney, Kristyn Ferretti
Devils And Gods	American Doll Posse	Jessica Staley, Shane White
Past The Mission	Under the Pink	Ted McKeever, Chris Chuckry (C)
Sweet the Sting	The Beekeeper	Jimmie Robinson
Ribbons Undone	The Beekeeper	Lea Hernandez
Pretty Good Year	Under the Pink	Derek McCulloch, Colleen Doran, Jason Hanley (L)

* – Song is a B-side from aforementioned album
(C) – Artist served as a colorist
(L) – Artist served as a letterer

== Editions ==
Comic Book Tattoo was initially made available in three formats, with the addition of another special edition released in November 2008. The available versions are;

- Paperback

ISBN 1-58240-964-1

- Hardback

ISBN 1-58240-965-X

- Limited Edition Hardback (Leather bound encased, signed by Tori Amos and uniquely numbered)

ISBN 1-58240-966-8

- Special Edition Hardback (With a slipcase cover)

ISBN 1-60706-031-0

== Awards and recognition ==
- 2009:
  - Eisner Award for Best Anthology: Comic Book Tattoo: Narrative Art Inspired by the Lyrics and Music of Tori Amos, edited by Rantz Hoseley (Image)
  - Eisner Award nomination for Best Publication Design: Comic Book Tattoo, designed by Tom Muller, art direction by Rantz Hoseley (Image)
  - Harvey Award for Best Anthology: Comic Book Tattoo, edited by Rantz Hoseley

== See also ==
- Tori Amos: Little Earthquakes (Z2 Comics, 2022) also edited by Rantz Hoseley
- Put the Book Back on the Shelf (Image Comics, 2006)
