= Nadya Lev =

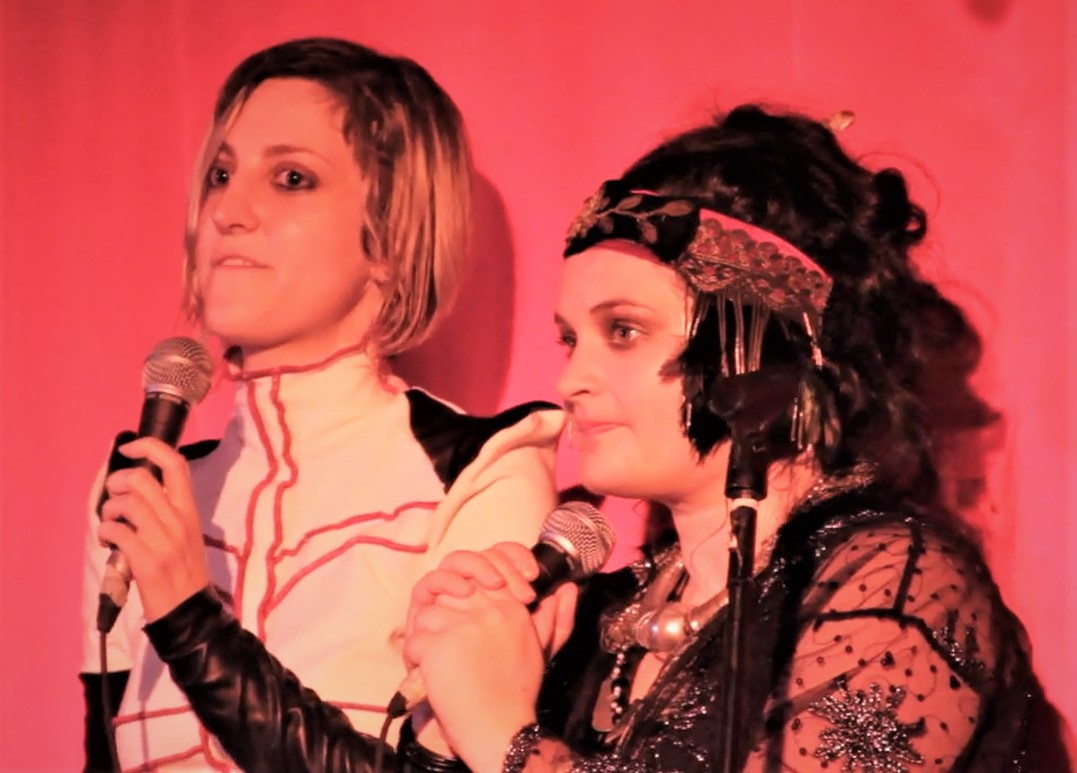
- Lev (left) with Meredith Yayanos in 2011
- Born: Надя (Надежда) Лев; Moscow, Russia
- Education: Temple University
- Occupations: Game designer, photographer, editor, publisher, and entrepreneur

Nadya Lev (born in Moscow, Russia) is a Russian-American photographer, editor, publisher, designer, and entrepreneur.

== Early life ==
Nadya Lev spent her childhood in the USSR, growing up in a Soviet dissident family.

== Career ==
=== Photography ===
Lev began her photography career at age 21, shooting the 50th anniversary cover for fetish fashion magazine Skin Two. Subsequently, her work was used by Vogue Italia, MTV, Dazed & Confused, Elle, Marie Claire, New York Magazine, Harper's Bazaar, The Museum at FIT and Nick Knight's SHOWStudio in features on alternative fashion. Lev's work has been described as sitting at the crossroads of portraiture and fashion, with her subjects possessing an "almost surreal combination of hollow power" and her work emphasizing "the model as storyteller rather than empty object." Seeking to understand photography from her models' perspective, Lev began posing as a subject for photographer colleagues. She has modeled for Clayton Cubitt, Allan Amato and Christopher Voelker.

In 2011, Lev became the second-youngest person in medical literature to be diagnosed with genetically-inherited PEX glaucoma. She lost a significant portion of her vision and underwent 15 eye surgeries. After adjusting to hallucination-like distortions in vision, Lev re-trained herself in photography and resumed publishing new work.

In 2013, Lev was appointed as general manager and later CEO of Zivity, an art patronage platform for models and photographers founded by Cyan Banister.

=== Print publishing ===
Lev is one of the co-founders of Coilhouse Magazine – a print and web art publication established in 2007, together with Meredith Yayanos and Zoetica Ebb. The magazine's tagline was "a love letter to alternative culture, in an era where alternative culture no longer exists." Coilhouse was widely acclaimed for thoughtful coverage of art, music, fashion, film, technology and literature. Coilhouse has also been praised for its high production value and original graphic design by creative director Courtney Riot. Lev's design for the original Coilhouse website, inspired by Merz Magazine and El Lissitzky, won L.A. Weekly's Best-Designed Site Aesthetic Award.

In 2017, Lev announced that she was working on a Japanese coffee-table art book titled Eros & Thanatos, together with Tokyo-based art magazine editor Masanao Amano.

=== Mixed reality ===
In 2016, Lev co-founded the technology company Aconite together with Star St.Germain. Lev describes Aconite as "a mixed reality storytelling platform." Lev and St.Germain define mixed reality stories as immersive experiences that sit at the intersection of adventure, narrative and gaming. The project draws on several gameplay, real-world exploration and storytelling traditions, including transmedia, psychogeography, escape rooms, and live-action roleplay.

Aconite's first prototype was Limberlost, a location-based game with a magical realist narrative written by Steen Comer, designed to be played at any bookstore or library in the world. The first playtest took place at Powell's Books during XOXO Fest 2016 in Portland. Players used their mobile phones to solve puzzles which led them through a sequence of physical books. Each book contained an illustration that acted as an augmented reality marker. When triggered, the markers displayed audiovisual data that provided clues for the next book in the sequence, and unlocked new parts of the game's narrative.

In 2019, Aconite came out of stealth mode and announced their first title, HoloVista.
