= Négar Djavadi =

Iranian-French novelist, screenwriter and filmmaker (born 1969)

- نگار جوادی
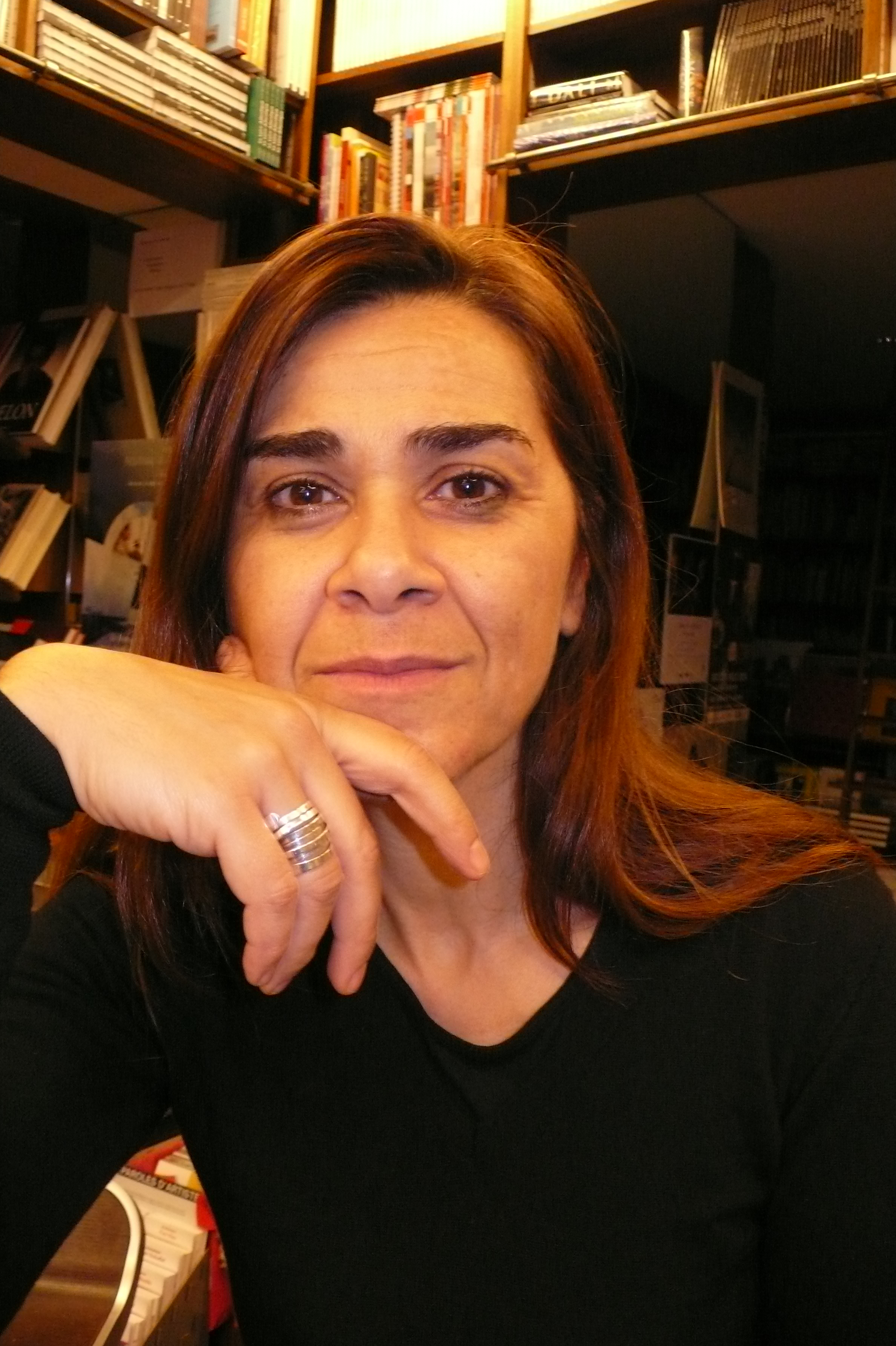
- Born: 1969 (age 56–57); Tehran, Pahlavi Iran (now Iran)
- Occupations: novelist, screenwriter, film director
- Relatives: Asghar Sayyed Javadi (father)
- Writing career
- Language: French
- Period: 1990s-present
- Notable work: Disoriental

Négar Djavadi (Persian: نگار جوادی; born 1969) is an Iranian-born French novelist, screenwriter and filmmaker, most noted for her 2016 novel Disoriental (Désorientale).

== Biography ==
Born in 1969, in Tehran, Pahlavi Iran (now Iran). Djavadi moved with her family to France shortly after the Iranian Revolution due to their opposition to the Ayatollah Ruhollah Khomeini. She studied film at the Institut national supérieur des arts du spectacle et des techniques de diffusion, and worked for a number of years as a screenwriter and film director. Her work in film included the short films L'Espace désolé (1995), Entre les vagues (1997), Comédie classique (2001) and Jeanne, à petits pas... (2005), the feature film 13 m² (2007) and the television film Né sous silence (2018).

Désorientale, her debut novel, was published in 2016, and Disoriental, its English translation by Tina Kover, was published in 2018. The original French edition won a number of literary awards in France and Belgium, including the Prix de L'Autre Monde, the Prix du Style, the Prix Emmanuel Roblès, the Prix Première, the Prix littéraire de la Porte Dorée and the Prix du Roman News. Its English translation by Tina Kover won the Lambda Literary Award for Bisexual Fiction at the 31st Lambda Literary Awards and the Van Cleef & Arpels Albertine Prize, and was shortlisted for the National Book Award for Translated Literature.
