= Coilhouse =

American magazine and blog

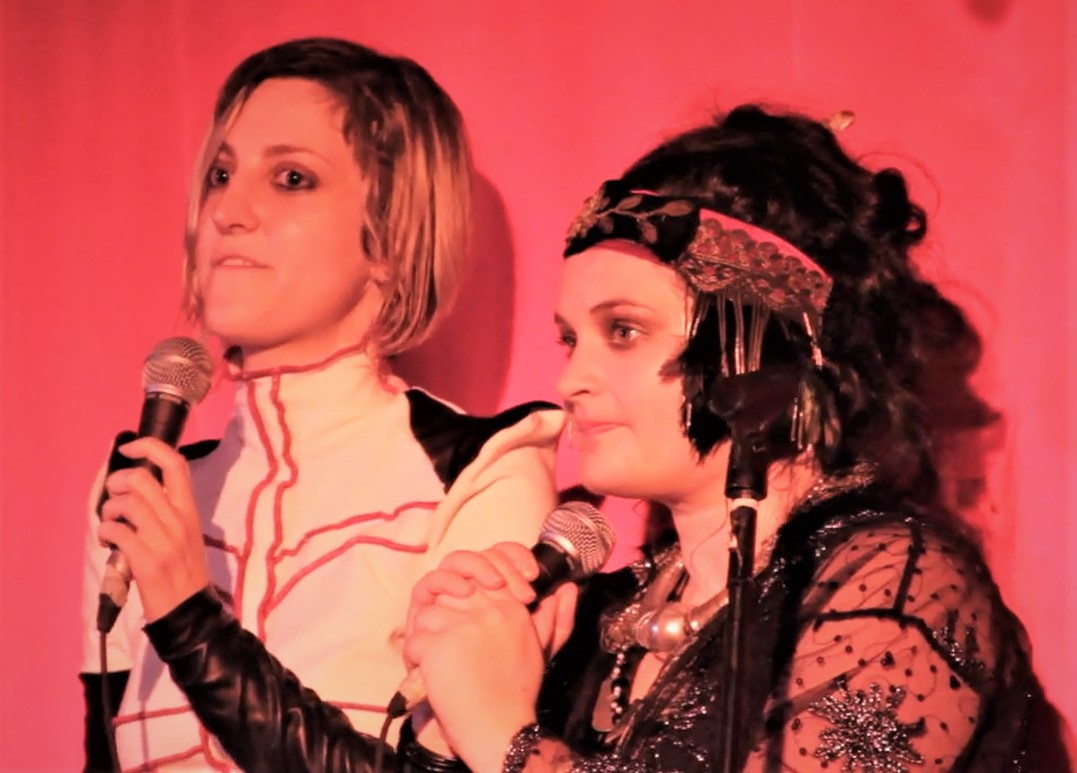
- Coilhouse founders Nadya Lev, Meredith Yayanos at the Coilhouse Black and White and Red All Over Ball, 2011
- Editor: Meredith Yayanos, Zoetica Ebb, Nadya Lev
- Frequency: Quarterly
- Publisher: Nadya Lev
- Founded: 2007
- Final issue: 2012
- Country: USA
- Language: English
- Website: coilhouse.net
- ISSN: 2151-416X

Coilhouse was an American digital and print magazine, and corresponding blog. It was founded in 2007 by Nadya Lev, Zoetica Ebb, and Meredith Yayanos, and carries the tagline, "A Love Letter to Alternative Culture." Regular contributors to Coilhouse included Ross Rosenberg, David Forbes, Angeliska Polacheck, and Jeffrey Wengrofsky.

The print and online editions of Coilhouse ended publication in 2012.
