= Hazel Bly and the Deep Blue Sea =

2021 children's book by Ashley Herring Blake

- Author: Ashley Herring Blake
- Language: English
- Genre: Middle grade fiction
- Publisher: Little, Brown and Company
- Publication date: May 25, 2021
- Publication place: United States
- Pages: 368
- ISBN: 978-0-316-53547-2

Hazel Bly and the Deep Blue Sea is a middle grade fiction written by Ashley Herring Blake and published on May 25, 2021, by Little, Brown. It tells the story of Hazel Bly and her family as they arrive at Rose Harbor, Maine, having moved towns several times prior. In this coastal town, Bly learns how to deal with the pain of having lost one of her mothers.

== Major theme ==
The central theme of Hazel Bly and the Deep Blue Sea is grief, more specifically the loss of a parent at a young age. Hazel Bly was traumatized by the death of her mother during a kayak accident, which she blames herself for, to the point she develops a fear of bodies of water.

== Reception ==
A starred review written by Publishers Weekly praised the characters written by Blake, and noted how emotional the story can be, as it deals with "grief, memory, and familial relationships." Another starred review, this time by the School Library Journal, said the author's writing and extensive character development "allow readers to empathize with Hazel."

Shoshana Flax, writing for The Horn Book, commented on Blake's ability at balancing "many plot elements, often serious ones, without overburdening the narrative" which led to a novel that focuses on the development of its characters. A review by The Booklist called Hazel Bly and the Deep Blue Sea "a moving story of grief and guilt," and noted the book is composed of both very sad as well as very uplifting moments. The reviewer concluded by saying the book "deals with loss in a way that feels accessible but never condescending."
