= Star St.Germain =

American game developer (born 1982)

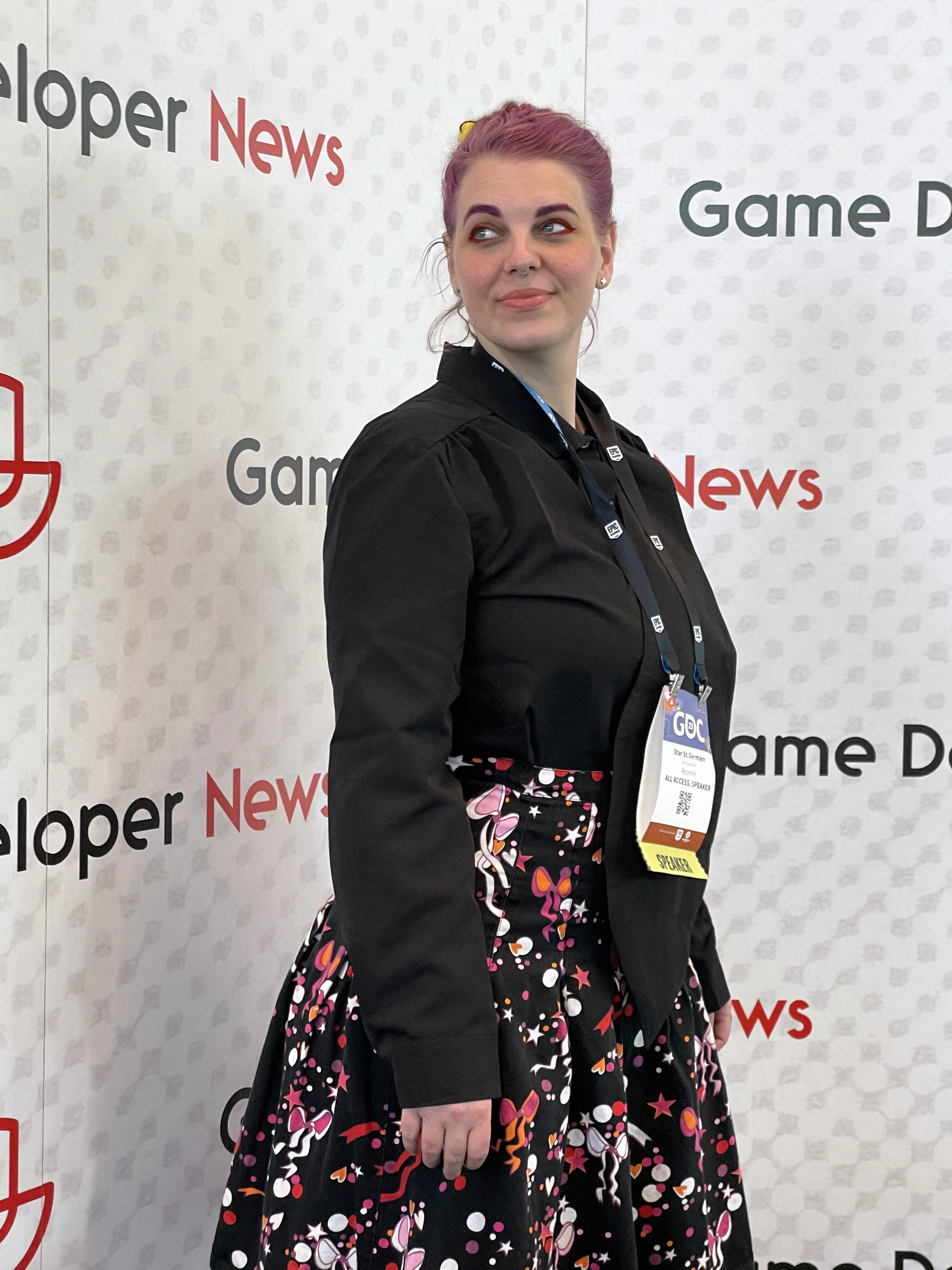
- Born: October 1, 1982 (age 44); Massachusetts, U.S.
- Education: Massachusetts College of Art and Design
- Occupations: Game developer, artist, designer, illustrator, musician
- Known for: HoloVista, Comic Book Tattoo, Bureau of Multiversal Arbitration

Star St.Germain is an American game developer, artist, designer, illustrator, and musician based in San Francisco, California. She is recognized for her work on the mixed reality game HoloVista, which won the Apple Design Award and the Webby People's Choice Award.

== Early life and career ==
Star St.Germain was born on October 1, 1982, in Massachusetts. She completed her Bachelor of Fine Arts at the Massachusetts College of Art and Design (MassArt) in Boston, after initially double-majoring in musical theater and scene design at another institution. At MassArt, she specialized in the Studio for Interrelated Media, studying various art forms including performance art, music, drawing, painting, animation, and video.

== Comics ==
St.Germain has been active in the comics industry as a writer, artist, colorist, and letterer. She has contributed to works published by Marvel, Image, and IDW Publishing. Among her notable contributions are Strange Tales, Girl Comics, and Womanthology: Heroic. She worked on Comic Book Tattoo, an anthology graphic novel based on the songs of Tori Amos that won both an Eisner and a Harvey Award.

== Music and performance ==
St.Germain is a musician who plays the electric cello. In 2003, she represented Boston at the National Poetry Slam. While residing in Los Angeles, she took up roles in acting and modeling. During 2006–2007, St.Germain collaborated with photographer David LaChapelle. She also appeared in music videos for Maroon 5 ("Won't Go Home Without You") and Beirut ("Elephant Gun"). In 2009, she founded the band This Can't End Well, where she contributed as a lead songwriter, singer, guitarist, cellist, and electronic drummer.

Noteworthy songs include the haunting & emotionally charged "Elephant" told from the perspective of Topsy the elephant who, after enduring circus abuse and killing an abusive handler who fed her a lit cigarette, was deemed too dangerous to keep & subsequently was publicly executed on January 4, 1903, at Coney Island's Luna Park, by feeding her cyanide-laced carrots before electrocuting her with 6,600 volts of alternating current in front of a crowd & afilm crew from Thomas Edison's company.

Noteworthy songs include the haunting & emotionally charged "Elephant" told from the perspective of Topsy the elephant who, after enduring circus abuse and killing an abusive handler who fed her a lit cigarette, was deemed too dangerous to keep & subsequently was publicly executed on January 4, 1903, at Coney Island's Luna Park, by feeding her cyanide-laced carrots before electrocuting her with 6,600 volts of alternating current in front of a crowd & afilm crew from Thomas Edison's company.

She was featured on the 2020 Negativland album The World Will Decide.

== Game development ==
In 2016, St.Germain co-founded mixed reality game studio Aconite together with Nadya Lev. Aconite's initial prototype, Limberlost, was designed as a location-based augmented reality game playable in bookstores or libraries worldwide.

In 2020, Aconite released HoloVista for iOS platforms. The game received attention for its innovative gameplay mechanics, visual style, and narrative. The gameplay involves exploring 360-degree panoramic scenes, taking photographs, and solving puzzles. The game received generally favorable reviews according to review aggregator Metacritic and won several awards, including the Apple Design Award, Indiecade Best Narrative Award, and Pocket Gamer's Most Innovative Game of the Year. St.Germain's background in theatrical set design and comics influenced her art direction for the game's environmental design. She has cited the concept of the memory palace the book House of Leaves, and the artwork of J. H. Williams III as inspirations for the game's environments.

In 2022, Aconite released the Bureau of Multiversal Arbitration, a multiplayer Discord game utilizing generative AI to facilitate collaborative storytelling. The game was distinguished for being the first of its kind and won the Breakthrough in Storytelling Award from the Columbia University School of the Arts' Digital Storytelling Lab and a nomination at A Maze.
