= Disoriental =

2016 novel by Negar Djavadi

- First edition
- Author: Négar Djavadi
- Original title: Désorientale
- Translator: Tina Kover
- Language: French
- Published: 2016
- Publisher: Éditions Liana Levi
- English publication date: 2018 (Europa Editions)
- ISBN: 2867468345

Disoriental (French: Désorientale) is a French-language novel by French-Iranian author Négar Djavadi, published by Éditions Liana Levi in 2016. Tina Kover translated the book into English, and this version was published by Europa Editions in 2018. It was the first novel written by the author.

The book is narrated by Kimiâ Sadr, who at age 10 flees Iran and goes to exile in Paris. She feels disoriented from her lack of status in the society, and the novel's title is a combination of the words "désorienter" and "oriental". Disoriental describes the history of her family, including her two older sisters, her six uncles, and her parents. Her father Darius, who does political advocacy, accommodates the narrator's tomboyish nature. Kimia is a bisexual person. Her mother Sara is also an activist.

Kimiâ's second uncle, a gay man, lives in a country where homosexuality is illegal and has a heterosexual marriage that produced children. The other characters see him as the family mythologist.

Foreshadowing is a common device in Disoriental.

== Reception ==
Azarin Sadegh of the Los Angeles Review of Books stated that the French original has a "rich, deep, lyrical, with cinematographic quality" while this aspect disappears in the English translation.

Dalia Sofer of The New York Times described this as a "rich" novel. She criticized the lengthy descriptions of Iranian history, arguing the passages are "weighing down" the content.

Robin Yassin-Kassab of The Guardian stated that "this novel compels the reader’s attention as consistently as it entertains."

The English translation of Disoriental was shortlisted for the 2019 Albertine Prize and the Warwick Prize for Women in Translation, and won the Lambda Literary Award for Bisexual Fiction at the 31st Lambda Literary Awards.
