= Girl Made of Stars =

2018 novel by Ashley Herring Blake

- Author: Ashley Herring Blake
- Cover artist: Whitney Leader-Picone
- Language: English
- Genre: Young adult fiction
- Publisher: Houghton Mifflin Harcourt
- Publication date: May 15, 2018
- Publication place: United States
- Media type: Print (hardcover, paperback), e-book
- Pages: 295
- ISBN: 9781328778239 (Hardcover)
- OCLC: 994534300
- Dewey Decimal: [Fic]
- LC Class: PZ7.1.B58 Gi 2018

Girl Made of Stars is a 2018 young adult fiction novel by Ashley Herring Blake that was published May 15, 2018 by Houghton Mifflin Harcourt. Girl Made of Stars is Blake's fourth novel. The novel focus on Mara, a student from Pebblebrook High School, who finds herself in a tense situation after her twin brother, Owen, is accused of sexual assault by his girlfriend, Hannah. Consequently, Mara's relationship with her brother deteriorates as she does not know who she should believe in this situation. In addition, Mara is crestfallen after splitting up with her long time girlfriend, Charlie, and attempts to reconcile with her after she broke up with her.

Upon release, Girl Made of Stars was positively received by critics. They praised the novel for the difficult themes that Blake tackles such as gender identity and the liveliness of both primary and secondary characters. Critics took exception to the amount of topics that Blake covered in her novel, arguing that the confluence of so many themes hurt the overall structure of the novel. In 2019, Blake's novel was included on the Amelia Bloomer book list, an annual list compiled by the American Library Association to recognize books aimed at teenagers that contain strong female characters and feminist messages. In the same year, Girl Made of Stars was nominated in the LGBTQ Children's and Young Adult Literature category at the 31st Lambda Literary Awards.

== Plot ==
Twin siblings Mara and Owen attend a weekend party with their peers from Pebblebrook High School. There, Owen meets up with his girlfriend, Hannah. Mara sees Charlie, her former girlfriend, holding another girl's hand, which bothers her. She asks Owen's best friend, Alex, to drive her home. Alex seeks out Owen, but returns with a pallid expression on his face, which arouses suspicion in Mara.

At school, Mara finds out that Owen missed his classes. Back home, she sees her brother sobbing and her parents inform her that Hannah has accused Owen of rape. Thereafter, Mara visits Charlie and go to the bowling alley. Mara inquires about Charlie's personal life and Charlie reveals that she identifies as genderqueer. Mara describes Charlie as her best friend, which makes Charlie storm off.

When Hannah returns to school, her peers affront her. Charlie and Mara try to protect her therefrom and Mara attacks a student who maligned Hannah. The principal witness the attack and suspends her. Mara's parents ground her for the entirety of the suspension, but they let her attend a school fundraiser. There, she works with Charlie and apologizes to her for their strained relationship. She opens up to Charlie about Mr. Knoll, a professor who fabricated reports of cheating against her to make sexual advances on her. The confession catches Charlie off guard and Mara leaves the event distraught and in tears.

Owen reveals that prosecutors have dropped the charges against him. Charlie visits Mara and apologizes for her reaction to her confession. Once night falls, Mara climbs on the roof to gaze at the stars with her brother. Owen starts telling a story and Mara concludes the story by retelling her interaction with Mr. Knoll. With the support of her brother and Charlie, Mara tells her parents about Mr. Knoll.

== Characters ==
Alex: Owen's long time best friend. He witnesses Owen's assault on Hannah and this strains their friendship. He develops a bond with Mara, which turns into a sexual relationship. He agrees to end the relationship as he and Mara find the relationship to be unhealthy since he admits that he used the relationship to temporarily forget about his problems.

Charlie: Mara's long-time girlfriend and main love interest. She reveals to Mara that she identifies as genderqueer; however, she fears that revealing this to her parents will disappoint them. She plays guitar and sings and ends up playing at a club where she invites Mara. She admits to Mara that she never lost interest in her and always wanted to re-establish their relationship. As Mara struggles to cope with Owen's actions and her encounter with Mr. Knoll, Charlie lends her support. Charlie also witnesses the assault on Hannah and attempts to help her recover therefrom.

Greta: A member of Mara's Empowerment student club at Pebblebrook. She used to have feelings for Owen. She votes for Mara to step down as president of the student club to avoid a conflict of interest. Greta picks up Mara as she trudges home alone after an argument with Charlie and apologizes for her actions in the student club.

Hannah: Owen's former girlfriend who winds up a victim of sexual assault. When she returns to school, she encounters a barrage of insults directed at her. She is the first person in whom Mara confides her encounter with Mr.Knoll. She is a long time friend of Mara. She is reluctant to press charges against Owen; however, once the case is set in motion, she testifies, but the prosecutors rebuke her testimony nevertheless.

Mara: the main protagonist of the novel. She leads the Empowerment student club, a club that publishes a paper whose goal is to address the gender inequalities that women face. She identifies as bisexual and dated Charlie for a while. She ends the relationship as she felt uncomfortable dating a friend and at the thought of having a sexual relationship. As a result of Mr. Knoll's actions, she is traumatized and only opens up once she is in the company of Charlie and Hannah. She shared a close bond with Owen and the two enjoyed gazing at the stars. Her relationship becomes strained with Owen as she does not lend credence to his retelling of the sexual assault; however, by the end of the novel, she attempts to repair their relationship.

Mr. Knoll: Mara's Grade 8 Math teacher. He fabricated a report of cheating against Mara to speak to her privately. Once he pulls her aside, he exposes himself to her and threatens to fail her if she does not perform a sexual act on him.

Owen: Mara's twin brother. After becoming intoxicated at the Pebblebrook weekend party, he sexually assaults Hannah. Instead of fessing up to his actions, he spreads rumors around Pebblebrook that besmirched Hannah's character. The charges against him are ultimately dropped.

== Critical reception ==
Girl Made of Stars received generally favorable reviews. Mary Cosola of Common Sense Media gave the novel a rating of four stars out of five, praising Mara's character, which readers can relate to since she has to overcome numerous hurdles. Although Cosola admires the breadth of issues that Blake attempts to address in the novel, she argues that the multitude of themes ultimately winds up overwhelming the reader. Kirkus Reviews praised the novel's representation of Charlie and Mara's sexualities, which represents a genuine depiction of their struggles. Leighanne Law of the School Library Journal praised the way in which the novel progress and the myriad of themes it broaches, considering the novel as a "must-read young adult book."

== Banned Book Controversy ==
The book was formally challenged in Escambia County Public Schools, Florida and is temporarily banned, pending investigation. In Florida, the ban is also proposed in Clay County School District, Collier County Public Schools, and Okaloosa County School District.
