= There Be Squabbles Ahead =

Studio album by Stolen Babies
- Released: October 3, 2006 (US)
- Recorded: Polymorph Recording, Oakland, California
- Genre: Avant-garde metal, progressive metal, alternative metal, dance-rock, experimental rock
- Length: 47:06
- Label: The End Records; No Comment Records
- Producer: Dan Rathbun; Stolen Babies

Stolen Babies chronology
There Be Squabbles Ahead (2006)	Naught (2012)

Professional ratings
Review scores
Source	Rating
About.com	3.5/5 stars
Allmusic	3.5/5 stars
Sea of Tranquility	4/5 stars
Sputnikmusic	4.5/5 stars
Stylus Magazine	B+
Ultimate Guitar	8.5/10 stars

There Be Squabbles Ahead is the first full-length album from Stolen Babies.

The album has received almost unanimously positive reviews, and has helped to expand their fanbase massively.

== Track listing ==
All songs written by Dominique Lenore Persi and Rani Sharone, except where noted.

1. "Spill!" – 3:21
2. "Awful Fall" – 3:44
3. "Filistata" – 3:17
4. "A Year of Judges" – 3:20
5. "So Close" – 4:21
6. "Tablescrap" – 3:54
7. "Swint? or Slude?" (Sharone) – 2:16
8. "Mind Your Eyes" – 4:04
9. "Lifeless" – 5:56
10. "Tall Tales" – 3:41
11. "Push Button" – 4:07
12. "Gathering Fingers" – 5:20
13. "The Button Has Been Pushed" – 1:45

== Info ==
- Additional background vocals on tracks 3, 7 and 12 performed by Dan Rathbun
- Additional tuba on track 7 performed by Dan Rathbun
- Violin on tracks 7 and 11 performed by Carla Kihlstedt
- Trumpet on tracks 3, 7 and 12 performed by Michael Iago Mellender
- Acoustic guitar on track 11 performed by Davin Givhan
- Recorded and mixed by Dan Rathbun
- Album artwork by Dominique Lenore Persi and Crab Scrambly

== Notes ==
- According to bassist Rani Sharone in an interview with Music Street Journal, track number seven obtained its title from some creative wordplay:

"It all started with the word "Interlude," the song's original title. Interlude...Int er lude...Swint er Slude...Swint or Slude...Swint or Slude?...there ya go... the metamorphosis of the word interlude. Loosely inspired by a Jeopardy category."

- "Filistata" is the name for a genus of spiders native to Eurasia and Northern Africa.
- "Push Button" was previously recorded and produced by John Avila.
