= HoloVista =

- Developer: Aconite
- Publisher: Aconite
- Platform: iOS
- Release: WW: September 30, 2020
- Genre: Exploration game
- Mode: Single-player

HoloVista is an augmented reality exploration game developed and published by Aconite. It was released for iOS in September 2020.

== Plot ==
Carmen is a young architect who is hired to take photographs of a mansion, only to discover there's more than it appears to be at first.

== Gameplay ==
In HoloVista, the players are using their phones to navigate through the mansion, often searching for particular items by looking around and solving puzzles. Carmen can post her images to social accounts or chat to other in-game characters. There are several rooms for every day of the week, where each day represents a new, separate chapter. By entering a room, the game lists three different objects, similar to hidden object games, to find and then take a picture. The players can either move around directly or swipe and scroll. When an item is found, the list replaces it with a new one until the players find every one of them. Several hints can be used in each level, which lead to one of the objects remaining.

== Development ==
HoloVista's development was led by Nadya Lev and Star St.Germain. Following the success of Pokémon Go, they founded Aconite as a part of their goal to create mixed reality projects with storytelling. With an experience in art and design, Lev and St. Germain wanted to present an aesthetic that would be usually seen in fashion spreads. Aconite worked with lead designers Jay Treat and Scott Jon Siegel, lead artist Blake Kathryn, narrative designer Whitney "Strix" Beltrán and DESKPOP composer Mariode. The team opted against developing the support for virtual reality, citing accessibility. The idea was to explore themes such as capitalism, maintaining authenticity and permanent storage of information on the Internet.

Lev got an inspiration for HoloVista after reading an article about the former Facebook executive, Chamath Palihapitiya, which got her thinking about how video games and social media could intersect. Several prototypes have been developed before HoloVista took on its current form. Aconite scrapped the story concept that was centered around an intern getting cancelled on social media for an article she wrote, while being thrown under the bus by her editors. The players would have been able to choose between two different photos to post on a simulated Instagram. Depending on the choices, the story would diverge in different ways. The team felt it was too close to real life, knowing the audience would want to see different things while playing a social media simulator. Another issue was that the players weren't able to figure out that each choice would have a consequence. One thing that was positively received was the way the phone would be used as a camera, which led the developers to pay a close attention to the user interface. When it was decided that the main character would be an architect, St. Germain used her theatre design background to create a memory palace which connected environments with thoughts and memories.

== Reception ==
HoloVista received "generally favorable" reviews, according to review aggregator Metacritic. During the 24th Annual D.I.C.E. Awards, the Academy of Interactive Arts & Sciences nominated HoloVista for "Mobile Game of the Year".
