= Feminazgûl =

American feminist black metal band

- Origin: North Carolina, U.S.
- Genres: Black metal; atmospheric black metal
- Years active: 2018–present
- Members: Margaret Killjoy; Laura Beach; Meredith Yayanos
- Website: www.feminazgul.com

Feminazgûl is an American black metal band from North Carolina. Their music is noted for themes relating to feminism, anti-fascism, anarchism, mythology, and fantasy. Founded by Margaret Killjoy in 2018, Feminazgûl released their debut EP, The Age of Men Is Over, the same year. The band released their first full-length album, No Dawn for Men, in 2020.

== History ==
Feminazgûl was founded by Margaret Killjoy, a transgender anarchist author, in 2018. She created the band's debut EP, The Age of Men Is Over, as a solo project the same year. The band was also included in the 2018 Worldwide Organization of Metalheads Against Nazis (W.O.M.A.N.) compilation album. In 2020, the band released their first full-length album, No Dawn for Men, with the addition of Laura Beach as lead vocalist and Meredith Yayanos as violinist and theremin player. Lars Gotrich writing for NPR described the album as "a viciously beautiful piece of feminist black metal". In 2021, Feminazgûl released a split album with Awenden.

Feminazgûl has been described as black metal and atmospheric black metal. The band has been noted for their feminist, anti-fascist, and anarchist beliefs. These beliefs come through in their music, which also often incorporates quotes and themes from mythology and fantasy.

Feminazgûl's name is a portmanteau of feminazi, a derogatory term for feminists, and Nazgûl, a group of wraiths controlled by Sauron in J. R. R. Tolkien's Middle-earth. Both of the band's album titles, The Age of Men Is Over and No Dawn for Men, are quotes from The Lord of the Rings.

== Band members ==
- Margaret Killjoy – multiple instruments, backup vocals
- Laura Beach – harsh vocals
- Meredith Yayanos – violin, theremin, backup vocals

== Discography ==
=== Studio albums ===
- No Dawn for Men (2020)

=== EPs ===
- The Age of Men Is Over (2018)

=== Singles ===
- "A Mallacht" (2021)

=== Other albums ===
- Worldwide Organization of Metalheads Against Nazis (compilation album, 2018)
- Awenden/Feminazgûl (split album with Awenden, 2021)
