= The Pervert =

2018 graphic novel

- Date: May 1, 2018
- Publisher: Image Comics

Creative team
- Writers: Remy Boydell and Michelle Perez
- ISBN: 978-1-5343-0741-4

The Pervert is a 2018 graphic novel by Remy Boydell and Michelle Perez about the experiences of a transgender escort in Seattle. The story is illustrated largely in watercolors, and is presented as loosely connected vignettes at various points in the main character's life. The novel was published by Image Comics in May 2018. Perez' contributions were informed by her own experiences as a transgender woman in the sex work industry.

== Plot ==
The Pervert's story is told through a series of vignettes, starting with the main character, a transgender woman, having sex with the manager of a McDonald's after closing time. While in the ball pit, she considers the consequences for killing him, but discards the idea after the thought of being placed in a men's prison arises. Much of the story takes place in Seattle.

The main character relates experiences seeking out sexual partners as a way of making money, particularly with relation to the challenges she faces due to not being openly transgender. One vignette shows her having lunch with her girlfriend, who she later breaks up with after a vacation to Portland, Oregon. Another establishes her relationship with Tom, a client who becomes increasingly interested in providing the main character with a stable home, which she is reluctant to accept. Her relationship with an older man, whose late wife was transgender, is also depicted; his descent into depression appears in panels interspersed later on in the novel.

Relationships between the main character and other sex workers are depicted in The Pervert; in many cases, those she connects with appear to have more put-together lives and are more careful with how they choose their clients. Graphic sex scenes are depicted frequently, though the main character doesn't attach significant emotion to them.

The main character's name, Felina Love, is only mentioned once towards the end of the novel, while she is in the airport having her last conversation with Tom. She hangs up, stating that she sees him as a friend, but that he still paid to have sex with her, and boards a flight to Detroit, Michigan, where she reunites with her father, acknowledging that whatever life she leads there is a "faint imitation" of what she had before.

== Reception ==
In The Comics Journal, on The Pervert, Carta Monir wrote: "If you want a happy reading experience, this isn’t it. But if you want to read something fucking real - like, almost too fucking real - this is the book of the decade."

The novel was a finalist for the Los Angeles Times Book Prize for Graphic Novel/Comics, and for the Lambda Literary Award for LGBTQ+ Graphic Novels in the award's 31st year. It was ranked seventh in Vulture's list of the best comics of 2018.
