= Stolen Babies =

American rock band

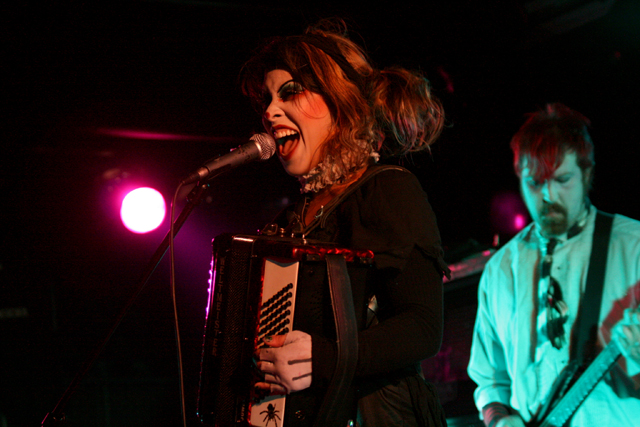
- Budapest, 2008

Background information
- Origin: California, United States
- Genres: Experimental rock, progressive metal, avant-garde metal, alternative metal, dance-rock, dark cabaret
- Years active: 2001–present
- Labels: No Comment, The End
- Members: Dominique Lenore Persi; Rani Sharone; Gil Sharone
- Past members: Ben Rico; Davin Givhan; Darling Freakhead; Arleena DeLaCruz
- Website: stolenbabiestheband.com

Stolen Babies is an American experimental rock band consisting of vocalist/accordionist Dominique Lenore Persi, the twin brothers Rani Sharone (bassist/guitarist) and Gil Sharone (drummer).

== History ==
Stolen Babies formed from a 12+ member high school performance troupe named The Fratellis; the band takes its name from one of the skits performed by the group during this period (written by Dominique Persi and her older brother, animator Raymond S. Persi). Stolen Babies released their first demo CD through their own label, No Comment Records.

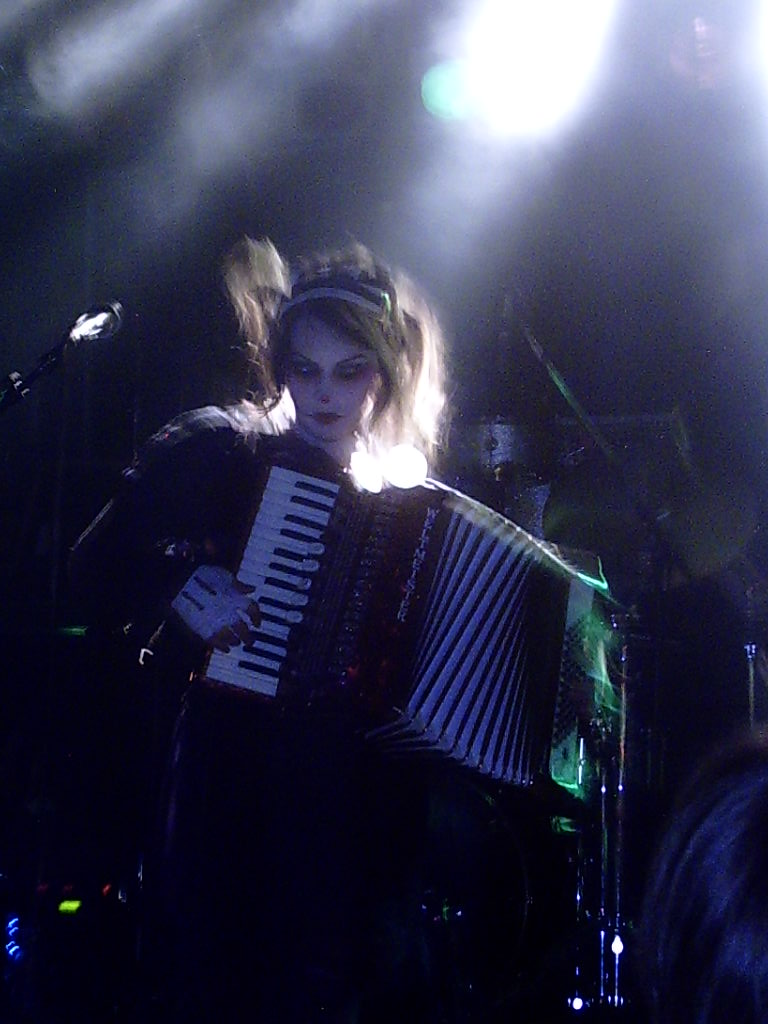
Dominique Lenore Persi (Munich, 2008)

Among the band's many musical influences are groups such as Oingo Boingo, Mr. Bungle, Cop Shoot Cop, and Fishbone (with whom Gil Sharone has performed). Stolen Babies are known for their unclassifiable odd rock and heavy, energetic performances. Except for the earliest demo, each album has featured artwork by indie comic artist Crab Scrambly.

There Be Squabbles Ahead, the band's debut full-length album (featuring remixed versions of "A Year of Judges" and "Push Button" from the 2004 demo), was released early in 2006 through the band's website, but was re-released on October 3 through The End Records. This album was produced by Dan Rathbun, member of the similarly "avant garde" experimental rock group Sleepytime Gorilla Museum, who also provides instrumentation on track 7 (tuba) as well as various background vocals on tracks 3, 7, and 12. Carla Kihlstedt (from Sleepytime Gorilla Museum) also contributed violin on tracks 7 and 11. The re-release also featured a music video for the song "Push Button" directed by Erik Tillmans. This album also marked the departure of Davin Givhan, the band's former guitarist. Guitarist George Earth, formerly of Switchblade Symphony, took Givhan's place during the international tour that followed.

They supported Lacuna Coil alongside Within Temptation and The Gathering on their The Hottest Chicks in Metal Tour 2007 featuring female-fronted metal bands.

According to an interview with Vampire Freaks their new album titled "Naught" was released October 16, 2012. From September 4 to 24, the band participated in the Epic Kings & Idols tour, supporting Devin Townsend, Katatonia, and Paradise Lost. They also participated in the "With a Vengeance" tour, in support of Otep, alongside New Years Day and Lydia Can't Breathe. The tour began on September 20, 2013 in Fresno, California, and ended on November 9 in Los Angeles, California.

On July 3, 2020, Stolen Babies released the single "Stolen Babies" on Bandcamp. It was their first new song released in eight years.

On October 30, 2021 they released a cover of the theme song to the stop-motion animated film Mad Monster Party? on Bandcamp.

== Line-up ==
=== Current members ===
- Dominique Lenore Persi – lead vocals, accordion
- Rani Sharone – bass, guitar, upright bass, backing vocals
- Gil Sharone – drums, percussion

=== Former members ===
- Ben Rico – keyboards, percussion, backing vocals
- Davin Givhan – guitar
- Darling Freakhead – guitar
- Arleena DeLaCruz – drums

== Discography ==
=== Studio albums ===
- 2006: There Be Squabbles Ahead
- 2012: Naught

=== Extended plays ===
- 2002: Stolen Babies EP

=== Singles ===
- 2010: Splatter
- 2011: Grubbery (Cooked to Perfection)
- 2020: Stolen Babies
- 2021: Mad Monster Party

=== Demos ===
- 2002: Album Demos
- 2004: The 2004 Demo

=== Music videos ===
- 2006: Push Button
- 2012: Second Sleep

== Side projects ==
Dominique Lenore Persi has played with indie pop-folk polka artist Horace Weintraub, and has lent her accordion-playing skills to many of his recordings.

Gil Sharone was a replacement drummer for +44 on their tours of Europe, Australia and Japan in early 2007.

Dominique Lenore Persi and Rani Sharone are participants in the Immersion Composition Society. They are members of the Los Angeles sect, Lodge of 1,000 Names.

Gil and Rani Sharone have played with Puscifer, the side project of Tool's frontman, Maynard James Keenan. In 2013, Rani Sharone remixed "The Green Valley" for Puscifer's "All Re-Mixed Up" remix album. The song features Rani as well as Gil on drums and Dominique on accordion.

Gil Sharone handled drum duties for the album Ire Works by The Dillinger Escape Plan, following the departure of Chris Pennie (who left to join Coheed and Cambria; with whom he has since parted ways). Gil Sharone was the permanent drummer for The Dillinger Escape Plan from 2007 to 2008 but left the band to have time for his other projects including a DVD on Reggae drumming and Stolen Babies.

Gil Sharone was/is the drummer of Marilyn Manson from 2014 to 2019 and 2024 to present. He played drums on the Marilyn Manson albums The Pale Emperor (2015) and Heaven Upside Down (2017).

Dominique Lenore Persi appeared on the album Z² by Canadian musician Devin Townsend, the Radioactive Chicken Heads' 2017 album Tales from the Coop, the soundtrack to the 2019 Richard Elfman movie Aliens, Clowns, & Geeks, as well as Los Angeles band Circle of Sighs' 2021 single "His Box."

Rani Sharone was involved in a solo project called Thrillsville, and the 2020 EP Say Goodbye to the Light features Persi on the tracks "So Close" and "Second Sleep," both of which being covers of Stolen Babies' previous works, as well as "The Fever." Sharone now has a solo project called And It Was Night, on which every single released so far has had Persi on backing vocals.

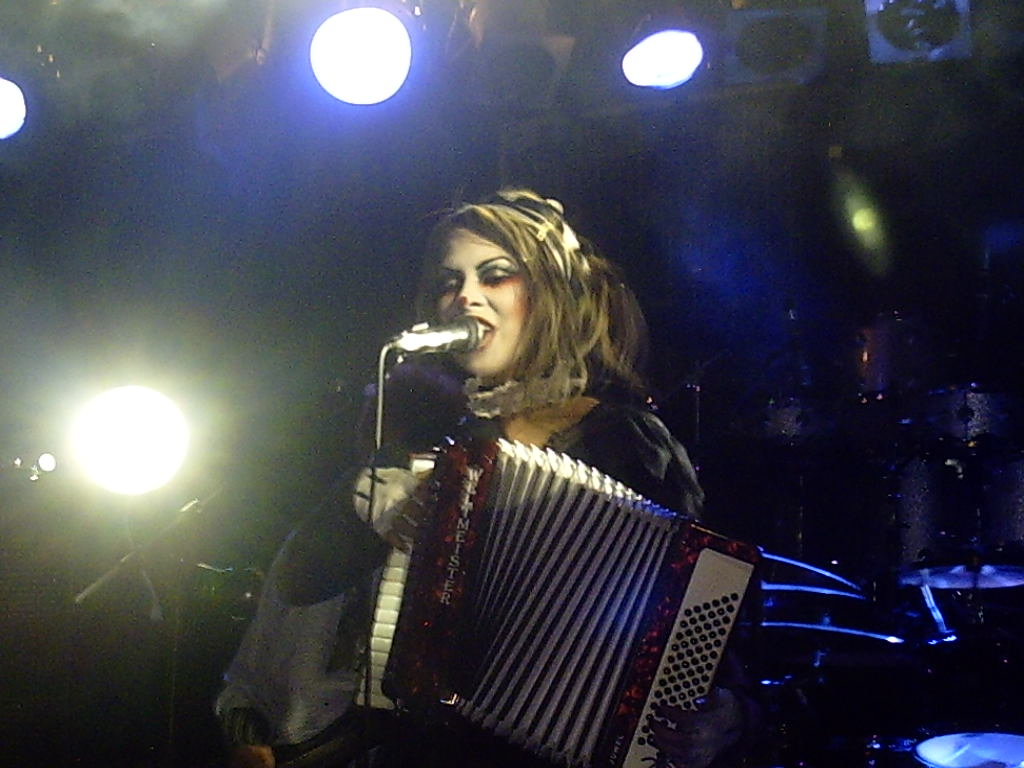

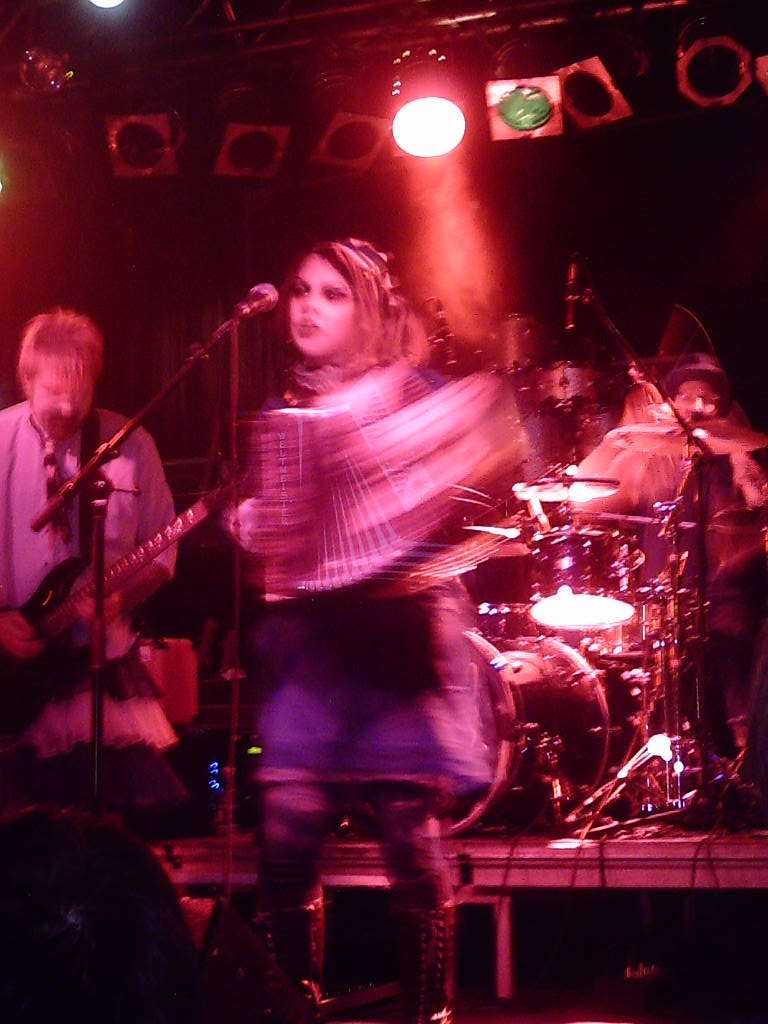
