= Ashley Herring Blake =

American author of children's fiction

- Education: Master's Degree in Teaching
- Alma mater: Berry College
- Children: 2
- Writing career
- Language: English
- Years active: 2016-now
- Genre: Young adult fiction
- Notable works: Ivy Aberdeen's Letter to the World, Girl Made of Stars
- Notable awards: Stonewall Honor 2019
- Website: ashleyherringblake.com

Ashley Herring Blake is an American author of children's, young adult, and adult fiction, best known for her Stonewall Honor Book Award-winning middle grade debut Ivy Aberdeen's Letter to the World and Girl Made of Stars.

== Personal life ==
She enrolled in college as a voice major, but changed it before the first semester. Blake has a master's degree from Berry College. Prior to becoming an author, Blake worked as a bookseller, teacher, and ABA therapist. She lives in Nashville, Tennessee, with her family. She is openly bisexual.

== Selected works ==
In 2019, her middle grade debut Ivy Aberdeen's Letter to the World, about a 12-year-old who is struggling with her attraction to girls in the wake of a natural catastrophe, was chosen as a Stonewall Honor Book. Her third young adult novel Girl Made of Stars, about a bisexual teen whose brother gets accused of having raped her best friend, was a finalist for a Lambda Literary Award.

== Bibliography ==
Young adult fiction

- Suffer Love (HMH, 2016)
- How to Make a Wish (HMH, 2017)
- Girl Made of Stars (HMH, 2018)

Middle grade fiction

- Ivy Aberdeen's Letter to the World (Little, Brown Books for Young Readers, 2018)
- The Mighty Heart of Sunny St. James (Little, Brown Books for Young Readers, 2019)
- Hazel Bly and the Deep Blue Sea (Little, Brown Books for Young Readers, 2021)

Adult fiction

- Delilah Green Doesn't Care (Berkley Books, 2022)
- Astrid Parker Doesn't Fail (Berkley Books, 2022)
- Iris Kelly Doesn't Date (Berkley Books, 2023)
- Make the Season Bright (Berkley Books, 2024)
- Dream on, Ramona Riley (Berkley Books, 2025)
- Get Over It, April Evans (Berkley Books, 2026)

== Awards ==
- Winner, Stonewall Honor Book in Children's and Young Adult Literature for Ivy Aberdeen's Letter to the World
- Finalist, Lambda Literary Award for LGBTQ Children's/Young for Girl Made of Stars
- 2022 - New York Public Library Best Books for Adults 2022 – Delilah Green Doesn't Care
