= Meredith Yayanos =

American musician

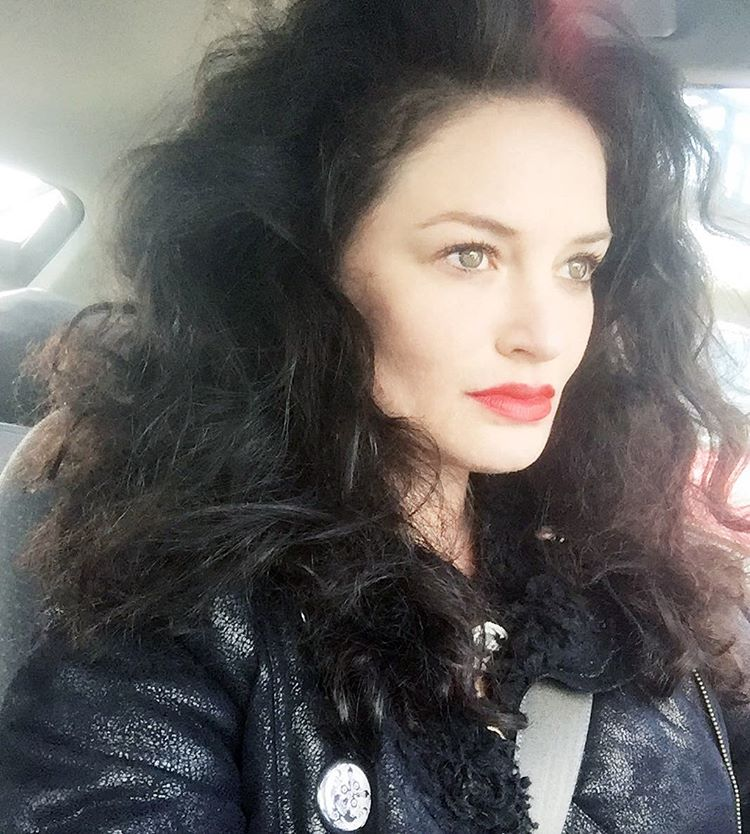
Self portrait of Yayanos in 2017

Meredith Anne Yayanos (born abt 1976) is a California-based violinist, vocalist, theremin player, and photographer. She was previously a member of the band Faun Fables and, since 2021, she has been a member of the band Feminazgûl. Her music has featured on the tracks of numerous other artists. Yayanos is also a founding member of the alternative magazine Coilhouse.

== Early life and education ==
Yayanos grew up in Solana Beach, California. When she was 7, one of her illustrations was printed in the paper. Two years later, she scored one of two late-game goals to help the Solana Beach Panthers win the U10 Country Cup Championships.

== Career ==
In 1991, she played at the Torrey Pines Music Festival near Solana Beach.

In 2001, Yayanos was a contributing artist to the comic book project 9-11: Emergency Relief, created to benefit the American Red Cross in the wake of the September 11 attacks.

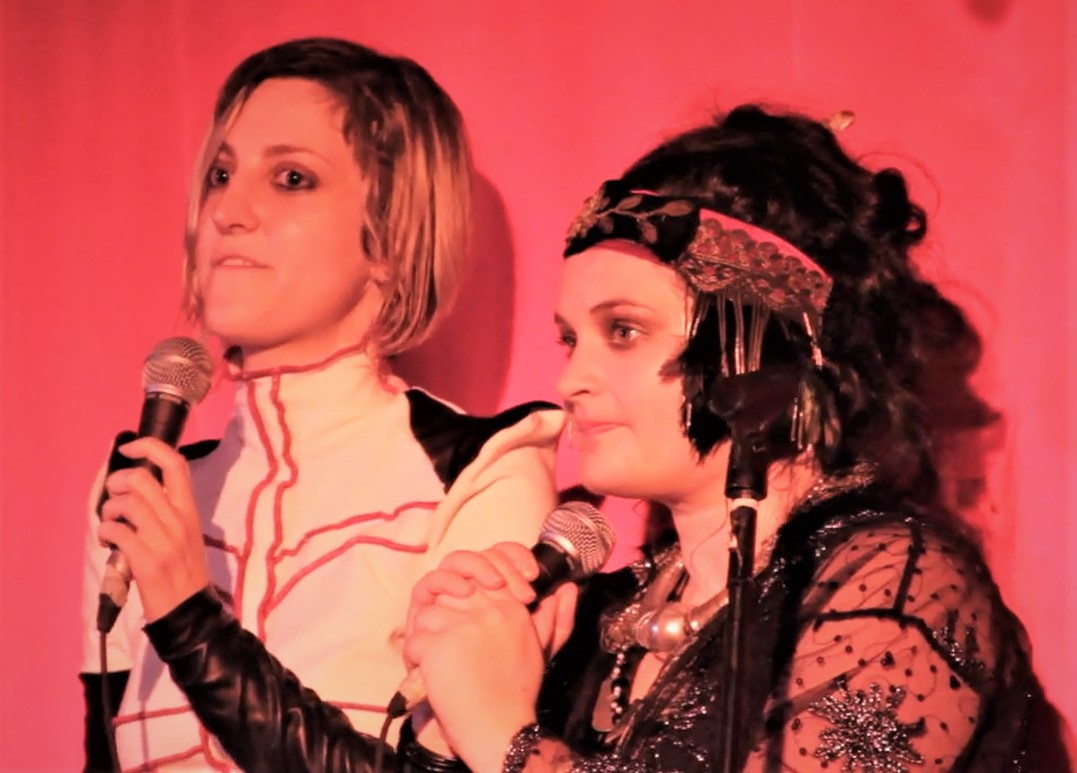
Yayanos (right) with Nadya Lev at the Coilhouse Black and White and Red All Over Ball, 2011

In 2010, Yayanos was playing violin in the band Faun Fables, including on the EP "Light of the Vaster Dark". Since 2021, Yayanos has been a member of the feminist black metal band Feminazgûl.

Her work has been featured on tracks with artists including The Dresden Dolls, The Vanity Set, Revue Noir, David Garland and The Walkmen. In 2021, she collaborated with Beverly Johnson and Wren Polansky to tell the stories of pioneer San Diego women using three media: dance, music, and art.

Yayanos was also the inspiration for a comic book character named Melanctha, appearing in the 21st issue of Planetary by Warren Ellis and John Cassaday.

== Critical reception ==
Of the Faun Fables, including Yayanos, the Staten Island Advance said "The quartet has a wealth of musical talent, quite capable of spinning out inventive arrangements played with panache..

Of the Yayanos playing on the band's fifth album "A Table Forgotten", the paper continued: "With its eerie theramin [sic]... and jittery, gypsy-tinged violin, the wistful title track bemoans the lost ritual of gathering around the kitchen table."

Of the song on the album "Hear the Grinder Creak" Pitchfork said: "a tune that turns the humdrum toil of flour-milling into a sort of survivalist mantra. Listen closely, though, and note the countering undercurrents: Heavily syncopated with handclaps and big drums, the song feels sexually suggestive. But ghastly harmonies and the moaning violin of Meredith Yayanos add a surfeit of foreboding, as though the labor wears on the singer with each cycle of the song."

== Discography ==
The following is a partial list of albums featuring Yayanos:

- 2001 – Raz Mesinai: Before the Law
- 2002 – Kings County Queens: Big Ideas
- 2002 – Love Life: Here Is Night, Brothers, Here the Birds Burn
- 2002 – The Vanity Set: Little Stabs at Happiness
- 2002 – The Walkmen: Everyone Who Pretended to Like Me Is Gone
- 2002 – Thomas Truax: Full Moon Over Wowtown
- 2003 – Piñataland: Songs From the Forgotten Future
- 2003 – David Garland: On the Other Side of the Window
- 2003 – Mike "Sport" Murphy: Uncle
- 2004 – Aaron English Band: All the Waters of This World
- 2004 – Barbez: Barbez
- 2004 – The Dresden Dolls: A Is for Accident
- 2004 – White Hassle: The Death of Song
- 2005 – Dame Darcy: Dame Darcy's Greatest Hits
- 2005 – Amiel: Accidents By Design
- 2005 – Botanica: Botanica vs. the Truth Fish
- 2005 – Parker and Lily: The Low Lows
- 2005 – Thomas Traux: Audio Addiction
- 2005 – Revue Noir: Projekt Presents: A Dark Cabaret
- 2006 – Various Artists: Brainwaves (song: "The Lovers" with Amanda Palmer
- 2008 – Faun Fables : A Table Forgotten
- 2009 – Elegi: Varde
- 2009 – Beats Antique: Contraption (EP Vol. 1)
- 2012 – Stolen Babies : "Naught" (song "Behind the Days")
- 2020 – Feminazgûl: No Dawn For Men
- 2021 – Feminazgûl: A Mallacht
