= Angelo Surmelis =

- Born: Angelo Surmelis; Bonn, Germany
- Occupations: Television Host, Designer
- Years active: 1995-Present
- Website: www.angelohome.com

Angelo Surmelis is a German-born Greek-American professional designer who resides in Los Angeles. He has been a professional designer since 1995. His clients included entertainment companies (Playboy), television shows (VH1's Flab to Fab), as well as private individuals. His company name is angelo:HOME. Surmelis was a designer on the TLC program Clean Sweep, the Lifetime program Merge, and the Style Network program My Celebrity Home. He then was host and designer on HGTV's 24 Hour Design for four seasons and then three seasons of the HGTV series Rate My Space with Angelo Surmelis. He has appeared in the book Conquer the Clutter.

Surmelis owns the brand angelo:HOME and is currently selling an upholstered furniture line at QVC, Overstock, Costco, CSN Stores, Kittles and Amazon.

Surmelis has appeared on NBC's The Today Show, CNN, Good Morning America, Extra (TV series), The Tyra Banks Show, and Good Day Live.

Surmelis, a Greek national, grew up in Greece. His family immigrated to Chicago when he was six and later he attended Columbia College there. He was a stage and screen actor in Chicago, New York City, and Los Angeles. As an actor Surmelis has appeared on Saturday Night Live, Port Charles, General Hospital, and Angel.
