= Sport communication =

Academic discipline

Sports communication is a field of communication studies that specializes in the elements of communication in sports. Sports communication can be defined as "a process by which people in sport, in a sport setting, or through a sport endeavor, share symbols as they create meaning through interaction".

== Sports communication studies ==
Sports communication is an area of communication studies that specializes in sports settings. Communication has become "a key factor for the efficient management of sports organizations, leading to the implementation of increasingly professionalized communication processes". The amount of research on the impacts of sports communication has grown exponentially since the 1980s. The communication offices of sports organizations have become more professionalized, allowing them to interact with their target audiences without needing traditional media. Therefore, they have been one of the fastest growing departments, given their work in social networks, internet, and institutional event management. Corporate communication allows sport entities to create and disseminate their own identity.

It encompasses the study of interpersonal and organizational communication (both verbal and non-verbal) between participants within a sport (e.g. players, coaches, managers, referees, and trainers), fans, and the media; and the way that sports are represented and communicated in the media. Sports communication is not restricted to professionals only, it is something that happens at different levels of play, ranging from preschool to college level.

One of the most popular areas of sports communication studies is finding the best way for teams to communicate better. Communication works best with people who are willing to work well as a team and is vital for the success of a program. Studies have found that communication in sports can be both positive and negative due to evidence that links communication and group cohesion. Coaches also play an integral role, and how they interact with their players greatly determines the athletes' responsiveness, motivation, and ability to learn. When coaches cultivate prosocial relationships with their players, such as confirming positive athlete behavior and addressing their potential, there is greater self-confidence and cohesion amongst the players. This field of study also examines how coaching strategies can adapt throughout a season or several seasons. For example, research suggests that positive instructional and structured coaching techniques that lead to more autocratic allowance by the end of a season can be highly effective in athlete development.

Another important avenue of sports communication study is gender and race equity. This applies to sports communication careers such as the media and organizational positions and representation of minority sports. For example, sports broadcasting has largely been dominated by male broadcasters. Although there has been a significant increase in opportunities for women as broadcasters, they are consistently seen as less authoritative than male reporters. This bias highlights gender stereotypes, gender pay gaps, misogyny, and further communication study can provide more insight. Sports communication research has also sought to improve opportunities for women and minority groups to reach roles like senior broadcaster and leadership in sports. One of the primary tools suggested is encouraging those with such roles already to provide mentorship and sponsorship for those looking to enter the field.

Non-verbal communication

Non-verbal communication is when two or more people express communication using anything besides words. This can be facial movement, reading posture, eye contact, or the tone of one's voice. Participants in sports use non-verbal communication when verbal communication cannot be used. Players and teams use non-verbal communication to connect coordination and share information or upcoming tactics. Effective non-verbal communication uses only necessary movement, as excessive movement can decrease effectiveness and coordination of the team.

== Interpersonal Sports Communication ==
Interpersonal communication in sports refers to the two-way exchange of verbal and non-verbal information, emotions, and meanings between two or more individuals within an athletic or sporting context.

Sports is not just a physical competition. It's fundamentally a web of human relationships. Sports consist of a multi-level network. Many people are connected to each other. Such as athletes, coaches, opponents, officials, fans all exist and interact within sport. Sports multi-level network also means these connections happen at different layers. Athlete to athlete, athlete to coach, team to team, coach to team, and etc. Every connection makes up various very diverse interpersonal relationships. However, people aren't just what make up sports' multi-level network. Competition, support, conflict resolution, and the creation of new contacts are also factors continuously converging in sports. New ways everyone relates in their relationships are created, generating even more different and diverse interpersonal relationships. For example, a captain and a coach may interact differently if they are discussing the team's strategy compared to when the captain is talking about a personal issue with the coach. Two people can have different relationships depending on the situation.

=== Coach-Athlete Communication ===
Athletes are motivated by two-way communication, particularly with coaches. The influence that coaches have on athletes is significant in sports. How coaches communicate with their athletes can affect athlete motivation. Athletes not only carry out their coach’s instructions but also think about what they’re told. They’re expected to understand and reflect on what the coach says. Coaching athletes involves giving commands as well as a mental exchange between coach and athlete.

Systematically in sports, coaches have more power than athletes. It’s their say over any player on what’s chosen within the team. They pick lineups, give feedback, among other responsibilities. Formally, coach-athlete interaction may be based on authority or rules. Although the relationship is unequal in power, it still functions like any other interpersonal relationship. Because of this, coaches may need to earn athletes’ commitment. Coaches may need to persuade rather than just order, build a relationship, and create a supportive team environment. For coaches, power alone may not be sufficient. Athletes may also challenge coaching decisions.

==== Positive Coach-Athlete Communication ====
Prosociality is considered important to positive interaction and communication between coaches and athletes. In this context, prosocial behavior refers to coaches and athletes both displaying voluntary behavior intended to benefit each other and the whole team. These actions and language are helpful, supportive, and cooperative. Examples in coaching include constructive feedback, active listening, encouragement, and acknowledging effort as well as results. Relationship building in sports involves coaches and athletes treating each other in positive and supportive ways. Some researchers describe coach–athlete relationships in terms of closeness, commitment, and complementarity. When coaches give athletes support and consider their input, their motivation tends to be higher. Offering choices and explaining the reasons for instructions can be very influential. Then athletes well-being, participation, and performance is aided, providing satisfaction for coaches as well.

==== Negative Coach-Athlete Communication ====
Negative communication between coaches and athletes is often characterized by criticism, punishment, intimidation, or limited feedback. This refers to an autocratic coaching style. This coaching style negatively impacts athletes’ attitudes toward several aspects of sport. This includes a poor response to the sport itself, their teammates, and the coach. This occurs when the coach gives athletes little input, support, or consideration when making decisions and gives orders. These negative tactics of controlling communication in sport often include using threats, extra conditioning, conditional approval. This has been associated with lower player motivation, anxiety, burnout, and dropout in athletes.

== Careers ==
=== Photojournalism ===
The various occupations that make up the field of sports communication involve covering, delivering, publicizing, financing, or shaping sports. Photography is key to the current state of sports communication. Sports fans often enjoy decorating with pictures of athletes. Photographers will also take live-action shots to capture movement or emotional stakes in the game. Professionals in sport communication craft and alter their work depending on the tone and what their audience needs or desires. Photography projects a feeling for a viewer, transmitting an emotional response. Photojournalists face challenges in the industry too, since they must negotiate selective access to sporting events, and must be well-versed in commercial licensing and image rights.

Although positions vary in both nature (e.g., management, publicity, writing) and scope (e.g., traditional print, television, radio, online), the various career paths in the field all hinge on the ability to communicate with key audiences. Audiences often consist of whatever constituencies are deemed most valuable to the organization. Key audiences may include fans, members of the public, politicians, owners and investors, athletes, and even other members of the media.

Sports marketers help communicate information about a sports event or market products through specialized promotions. People post on social media about games, new players, new coaches, and other important news on their team. Education careers that relate to sports communication can also be found via sports administrative degrees and the professors who teach in the discipline. Sports communication can be considered linguistic, but other communication types, such as body movement and mannerisms can be formally taught. Administrative communication is also vital to the success of programs and student progress. Sports administration can often lead to roles in related professions, such as broadcasting and marketing.

- Agents and Business Managers of Artists, Performers, and Athletes.
- Communications Teachers, Postsecondary.

Career topics

Careers in the entertainment industry that involve sports communication include the following: blogger, media relations expert, event planner, producer, and director.

Some of the best opportunities in sport communication involve behind-the-scenes occupations, many of which exist in the production and operations sides of the industry. Examples include equipment technician, audio engineer, sport videographer, graphic designer, and technical writer. Some sport arena and stadium jobs can be electronic technician, master control operator, public address announcer, and video engineer.

Careers in entertainment

Movies and TV shows contain many examples of communication about sports. Sports documentaries show the significance of the historical events. Shows like 30 for 30 by ESPN allow the viewer to quickly be informed about their interests and current events. Some related fields include:

- Entertainers and Performers, Sports and Related Workers, All Others.
- Public Relations Specialists.
- Radio and Television Announcers.
- Reporters and Correspondents.

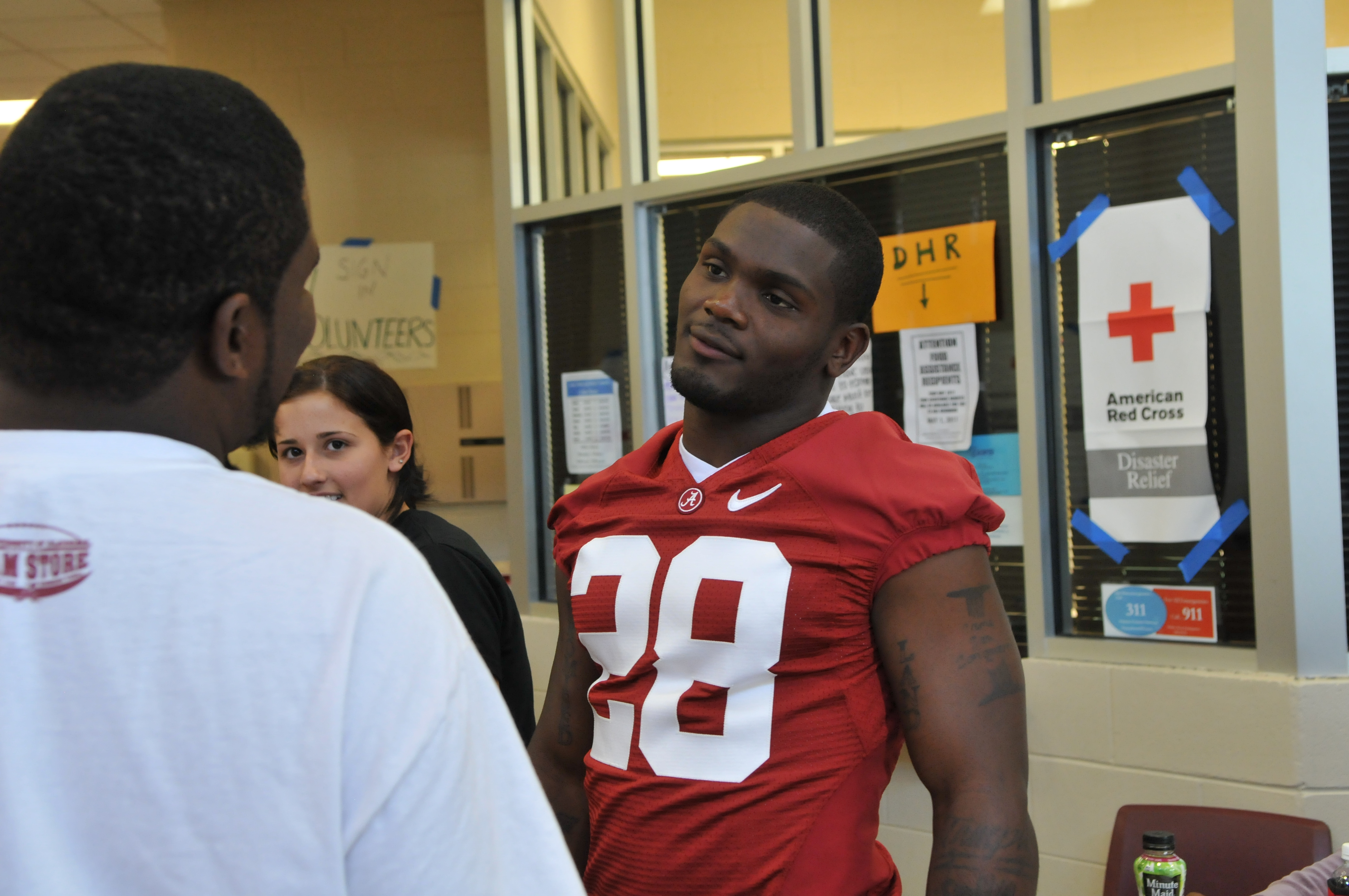
Former Alabama football player Javier Arenas at a Red Cross volunteer event following Tornado of 2011 in Tuscaloosa, Alabama

== Public interaction ==
There are many ways a professional athlete or sports team can interact with the public. The most common is through media coverage and marketing, but organizations might also develop a social media brand to drive engagement on social media. Social media communications have been statistically proven to have a significant effect on sports involvement and online community engagement. A case study of digital spaces and brands in the National Basketball Association also provides evidence of the importance of social media in branding through a Cleveland Cavaliers study on brand development, brand communication, and brand discussion. The increase in social media presence can directly lead to fan engagement with the team, leading to higher ticket and merchandise sales.

Sponsorship is a big way sports organizations create an image for their team. For example, many athletes publicly speak to children or act as motivational speakers. In tough situations, such as the aftermath of natural disasters, well-known athletes can lift the morale of an affected community. Sports writer Lars Anderson wrote in his book The Storm and The Tide about how local athletes at the University of Alabama helped unite a town after a disastrous tornado. A big part of public interaction is dealing with the fans. There are examples everywhere of positive and negative interactions between players and fans. Sports communication theories allow for the analysis of many facets of communication such as gender, race, identity, culture, and politics.

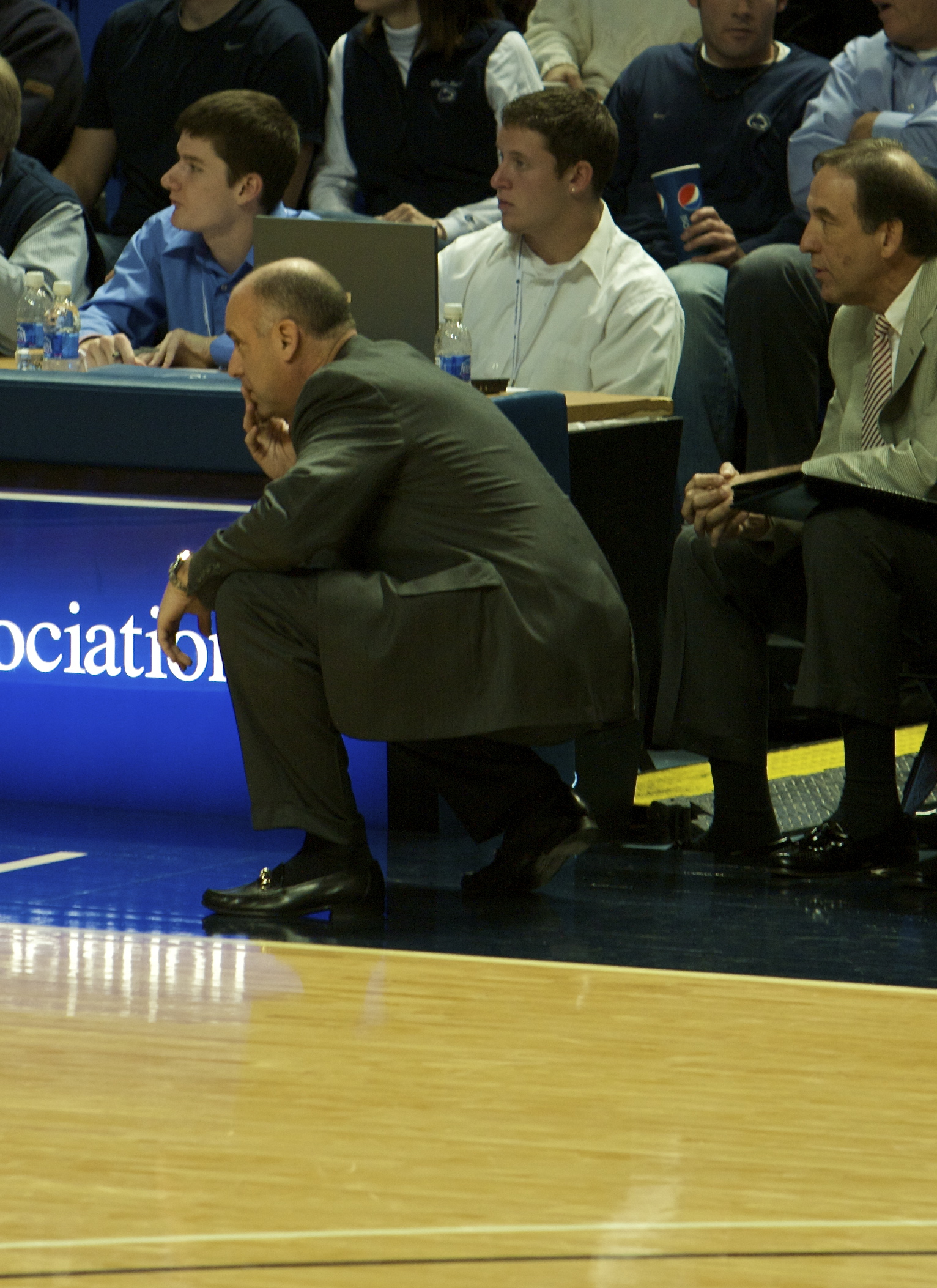

Sports communication varies vastly between individual sports. An example of sports communication and its effects on players, organizations, and media was the well-documented conflict involving two players for the Miami Dolphins. Inappropriate, discriminatory, and abusive interactions between Richie Incognito and Jonathan Martin led to the release of Richie from the team, organizational issues, and an abundance of media coverage. Another example is the recent "deflategate" scandal involving the New England Patriots allegedly deflating the footballs during half-time of the AFC Championship game against the Indianapolis Colts. Head coach Bill Belichick claims that any wrongdoing was done by the team's equipment manager and ball boy, and no communication had occurred between them at any point in the game. The media coverage led to a widespread and highly publicized scandal that could have jeopardized the Patriots' participation in the Super Bowl. The way an organization is portrayed by the media, true or not, can also greatly alter the way the public perceives them.

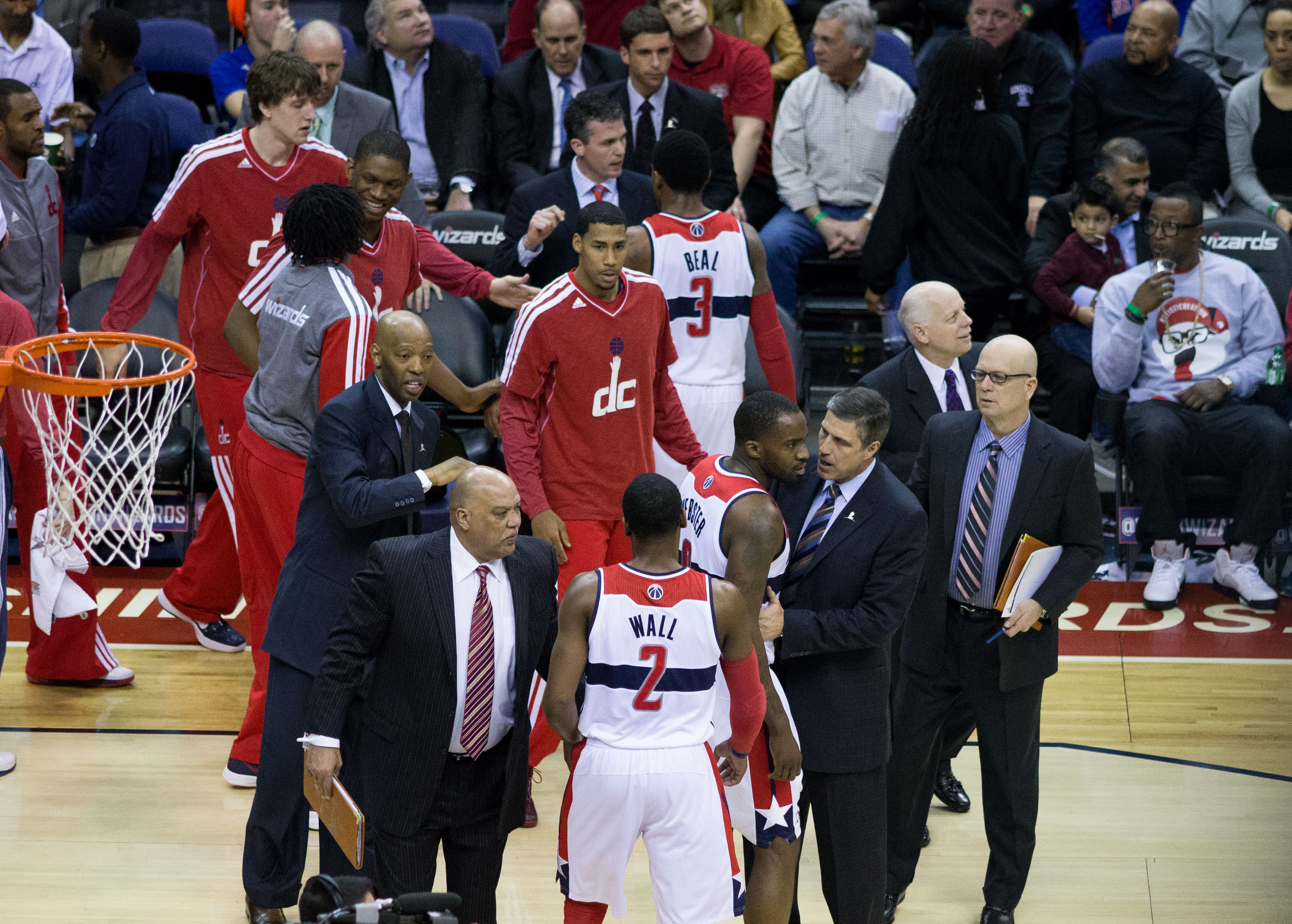

Connections sports communication also focuses on interpersonal relationships between coaches, players, referees, athletic trainers, and other people who work for the team. Reporters will ask these personnel questions often about a player, team, or someone who is injured, and write reports back to their network for a published article. Most outlets need photographers to take pictures of players for either magazines or their social media pages. These photos are used on "Rookie Cards" that are also valued by fans, sometimes being traded for large amounts of money.
