= 1920 in art =

Events from the year 1920 in art.

== Events ==
- February 1 – The National Art Gallery of Georgia opens in Tbilisi.
- March 17 – The Edith Cavell Memorial, by George Frampton, is unveiled in London.
- March 27 – Society of Wood Engravers founded in the United Kingdom.
- May 3 – The Royal Academy Exhibition of 1920 opens at Burlington House in London
- June 30–August 25 – The first Dadaist Fair is held in Berlin (Tempelhof). The Cologne group is formed by Jean Arp, Max Ernst and Alfred Grünwald.
- August 5 – Publication of the 'Realistic Manifesto', a Constructivist text, by Naum Gabo with his brother Anton Pevsner in Moscow.
- November 7 – The "mass action" The Storming of the Winter Palace, directed by Nikolai Evreinov, is staged outside the Winter Palace in Petrograd.
- unknown dates
  - Katherine Dreier, Man Ray and Marcel Duchamp form Société Anonyme.
  - Bernard Leach and Shoji Hamada set up the Leach Pottery in St Ives, Cornwall.
  - The Heckscher Museum of Art is established in Huntington, New York.
  - The Latvian Museum of Foreign Art is established in Riga.
  - Droit de suite is introduced in France.

== Works ==
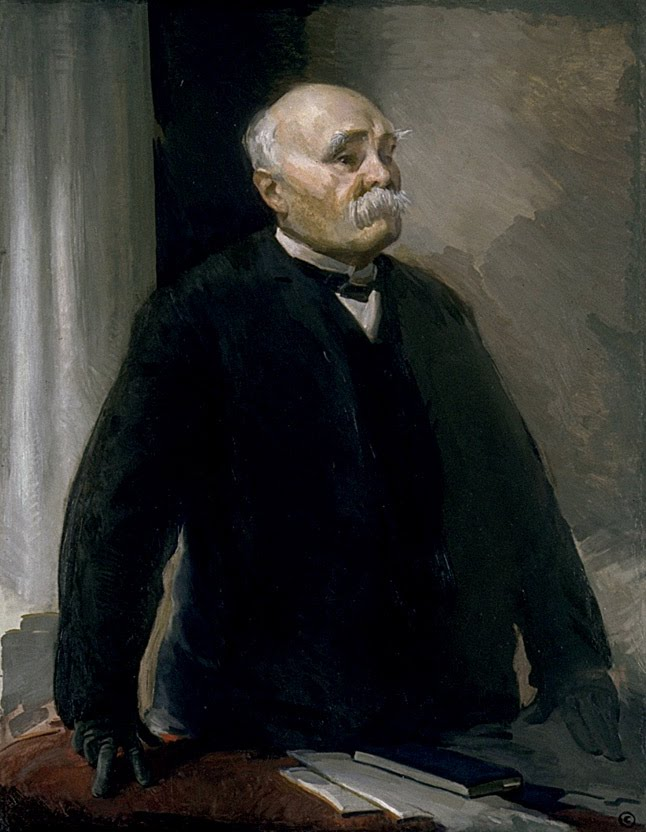
Georges Clemenceau by Cecilia Beaux

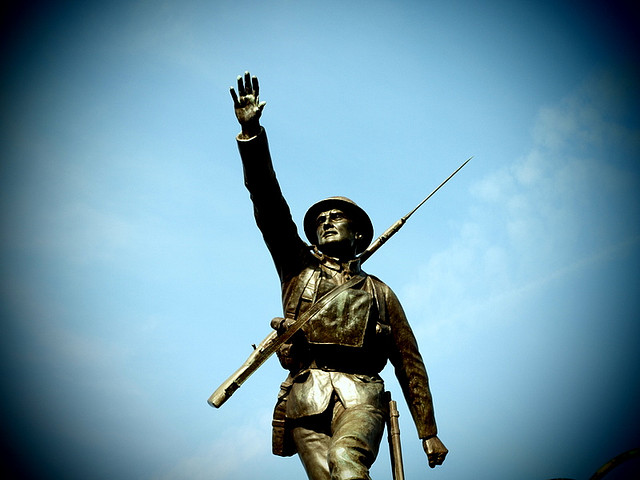
War memorial at Bridgnorth, England by Adrian Jones

- Hans Baluschek – City of Workers
- Cecilia Beaux – portrait of Georges Clemenceau
- Thomas Hart Benton – People of Chilmark
- Pierre Bonnard – Normand Landscape
- Alexander Stirling Calder – Swann Memorial Fountain (Philadelphia)
- Sydney Carline – The Destruction of the Turkish Transport in the Gorge of the Wadi Fara, Palestine
- Giorgio de Chirico – Self-portrait
- Lovis Corinth – Flowers and Wilhelmine
- Charles Demuth – Machinery (drawing)
- Otto Dix
  - The Skat Players
  - The Match Seller
  - Prague Street
- Max Ernst
  - The Hat Makes the Man (collage and gouache)
  - Murdering Airplane (collage)
- James Earle Fraser – Frederick Keep Monument (Washington, D.C.)
- Daniel Chester French
  - Abraham Lincoln (statue in Lincoln Memorial, Washington, D.C.)
  - Dupont Circle Fountain (Washington, D.C.)
  - Wisconsin (statue on Wisconsin State Capitol)
- Albert Gleizes – Woman with Black Glove
- J. W. Godward – A Red, Red Rose
- George Grosz
  - Daum marries her pedantic automaton George in May 1920, John Heartfield is very glad of it
  - Republican Automatons
- Richard Jack – The Passing of the Chieftain
- Goscombe John – Equestrian statue of the Viscount Wolseley (London)
- Einar Jónsson – Thorfinn Karlsefni (bronze statue, Philadelphia)
- Eric Kennington – The Victims (retitled The Conquerors)
- Winifred Knights – The Deluge
- Boris Kustodiev
  - Blue House
  - The Bolshevik
  - Portrait of Isaak Brodsky
  - Trinity Day
- George Washington Lambert – A Sergeant of the Light Horse
- Fernand Léger – The Tugboat
- Edwin Lutyens
  - The Cenotaph, Whitehall, London (stone version)
  - with Alfred Munnings (sculptor) – Equestrian statue of Edward Horner, St Andrew's Church, Mells, Somerset, England
- Paul Klee
  - Angelus Novus (worked copper plate)
  - Camel (in Rhythmic Landscape with Trees)
- Stanton Macdonald-Wright – Airplane Synchromy in Yellow-Orange
- Henri Matisse – Interior at Nice
- Joan Miró
  - Horse, Pipe and Red Flower (Caballo, pipa y flor roja)
  - The Spanish Playing Cards (Les cartes espagnoles)
- Alfred Munnings – Tagg's Island
- C. R. W. Nevinson – The Soul of the Soulless City (originally New York – an Abstraction)
- William Nicholson
  - Gertrude Jekyll
  - Miss Jekyll's Gardening Boots
- Kuzma Petrov-Vodkin – 1918 in Petrograd (Petrograd Madonna)
- Victor Rousseau – Bronze figure group for Anglo-Belgian Memorial, London
- Charles Marie Louis Joseph Sarrabezolles – L'Âme de la France (plaster version)
- Georg Scholz – Industrial Farmers (Von der Heydt Museum, Wuppertal)
- Charles Sheeler – Church Street El
- Mario Sironi – Truck
- Stanley Spencer
  - The Last Supper
  - Christ Carrying the Cross
- Lorado Taft – Fountain of Time (Chicago)
- Aston Webb (architect) and Alfred Drury (sculptor) – London Troops War Memorial

== Publications ==
- Daniel-Henry Kahnweiler – Der Weg zum Kubismus ("The Rise of Cubism").

== Births ==
=== January to June ===
- January 12 – Bill Reid, Canadian artist (d. 1998).
- January 17 – Georges Pichard, French comics artist (d. 2003).
- January 30 – Patrick Heron, English painter, writer and designer (d. 1999).
- February 22 – Rocco Borella, Italian painter (d. 1994).
- March 3 – Ronald Searle, English cartoonist (d. 2011).
- March 14 – Hank Ketcham, American cartoonist (d. 2001).
- March 19 – Kjell Aukrust, Norwegian poet and artist (d. 2002)
- March 27 – Robin Jacques, English illustrator (d. 1995).
- April 8 – Hans Coper, German-born studio potter (d. 1981).
- April 24 – Paul Wonner, American painter (d. 2008).
- April 26 – Maynard Reece, American painter (d. 2020)
- May – Hans Josephsohn, German-born sculptor (d. 2012).
- May 8
  - Saul Bass, American graphic designer and filmmaker (d. 1996).
  - Tom of Finland, Finnish fetish artist (d. 1991).
- May 10 - Erna Viitol, Estonian sculptor (d. 2001).
- June 4 – Alejandro Obregón, Colombian painter, muralist, sculptor and engraver (d. 1992).
- June 24
  - John Coplans, British-born painter and photographer (d. 2003)
  - Jimmy Ernst, German-born American painter (d. 1984).
- June 29
  - Ray Harryhausen, American-born British stop-motion animator and sculptor (d. 2013).
  - Armin Hofmann, Swiss graphic designer (d. 2020).

=== July to December ===
- July 20 – Arthur Boyd, Australian painter and sculptor (d. 1999).
- July 21 – Constant Nieuwenhuys, Dutch painter, one of the innovators of Unitary Urbanism (d. 2005).
- August 1 – Ken Bald, American comic book artist and illustrator (d. 2019)
- August 5 – George Tooker, American figurative painter (d. 2011).
- August 9 – Gerda Schmidt-Panknin, German painter (d. 2021)
- August 15 – Judy Cassab, born Judit Kaszab, Austrian-born Australian portrait painter (d. 2015).
- August 22 – Gene Davis, American painter (d. 1985).
- August 26
  - Mauri Favén, Finnish painter (d. 2006).
  - Brant Parker, American cartoonist (d. 2007).
- August 30 – Leonid Shvartsman, Soviet and Russian animator and artist (d. 2022).
- October 13 – Elaine Hamilton, American painter (d. 2010).
- October 31 – Helmut Newton, German-born photographer (d. 2004).
- November 15 – Wayne Thiebaud, American painter (d. 2021)
- November 30 – Walter Chandoha, American cat photographer (d. 2019).
- December 14 – Claire Fejes, American artist (d. 1998).
- December 18 – Enrique Grau, Colombian painter and sculptor (d. 2004).
- December 21 – Bob Bindig, American illustrator (d. 2007)

=== Full date unknown ===
- Adrian Heath, Burmese-born English painter (d. 1992).
- Raymond Moore, English landscape photographer (d. 1987).
- Daniel O'Neill, Irish painter (d. 1974).

== Deaths ==
- January 24 – Amedeo Modigliani, Italian-born painter and sculptor (b. 1884)
- January 26 – Jeanne Hébuterne, French artist, Modigliani's mistress and model (suicide) (b. 1898)
- March 3 – Theodor Philipsen, Danish painter (b. 1840)
- March 13 – Mary Devens, American pictorial photographer (b. 1857)
- March 15 – Edith Holden, English nature artist and art teacher (b. 1871)
- March 26 – Samuel Colman, American painter and designer (b. 1832)
- April 20 – Briton Rivière, British painter (b. 1840)
- April 27 – Jacob Ungerer, German sculptor (b. 1840)
- May 7 – Hugh Thomson, British illustrator (b. 1860)
- May 12 – Georges Petit, French art dealer (b. 1856)
- July 5 – Max Klinger, German painter and sculptor (b. 1857)
- July 14 – Albert von Keller, German painter (b. 1844)
- July 17 – Sir Edmund Elton, 8th Baronet, English studio potter (b. 1846)
- August 4 – C. G. Finch-Davies, British bird painter (b. 1875)
- August 6 – Edward Francis Searles, American interior designer (b. 1841)
- August 12 – Walter W. Winans, American sculptor, painter, marksman and horse-breeder (b. 1852)
- August 22 – Anders Zorn, Swedish portrait painter (b. 1860)
- September 24 – Peter Carl Fabergé, Russian-born jeweller (b. 1846)
- November 13 – Luc-Olivier Merson, French painter (b. 1846)
- date unknown – Edith Corbet, Australian-born British landscape painter (b. 1846)
