= Machinery (disambiguation) =

Machinery refers to mechanical machines.

Machinery may also refer to:

- Agricultural machinery, machinery used in agriculture
- Cotton-spinning machinery, machinery used to spin cotton
- Stage machinery, mechanical devices used in stage productions
- Machinery of government, processes of government
- Machinery (Demuth), a 1920 drawing by Charles Demuth
- Machinery Records, a German record label
- "Machinery", a 1982 single by Sheena Easton
- "p:Machinery", a 1985 single by Propaganda
- The Machinery, a Swedish television series

== See also ==
- Machineri
