= Signing the Register =

Painting by Edmund Blair Leighton

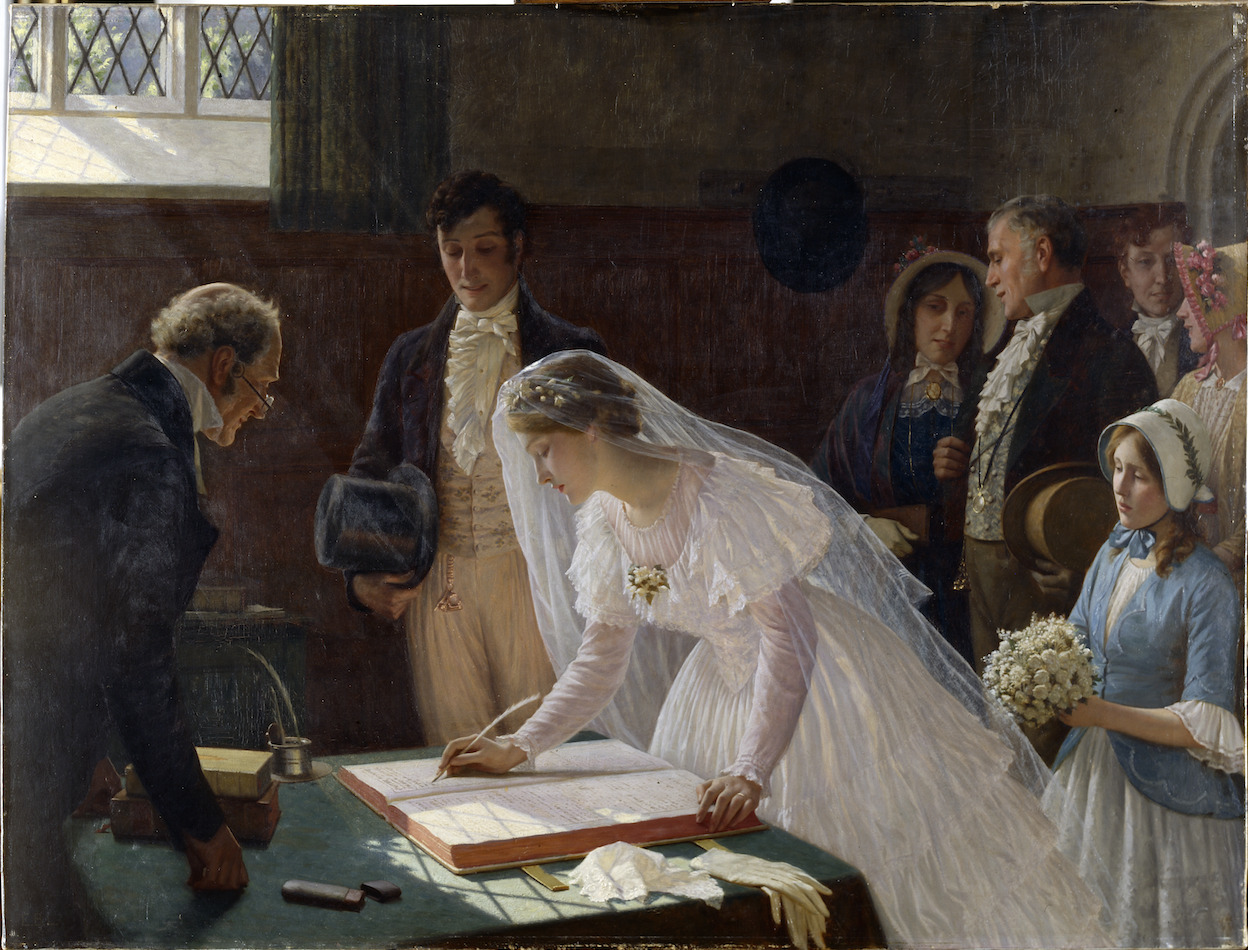
- Artist: Edmund Blair Leighton
- Year: 1920
- Medium: Oil on canvas
- Dimensions: 91.4 cm × 118.5 cm (36.0 in × 46.7 in)
- Location: Bristol Museum & Art Gallery, Bristol

Signing the Register, also known as The Wedding Register or Mated, is a painting by Edmund Blair Leighton associated with 1920 due to its exhibition at the Royal Academy Exhibition in that year, making it one of Leighton's later paintings, which is reflected in the skills displayed in its creation.

It is displayed at Bristol City Museum & Art Gallery, where it has been since it was gifted by Lady Lennard in 1948. The preliminary sketch is on sale at Simonis & Buunk Fine Art Dealers for €22,500.

== Description ==
The painting depicts a Regency-era couple in the middle of legalising their marriage. They stand before the state official, the witnesses to their signing. The young bride is centred in the painting, poised over the wedding register as she signs it with a sense of significance. She is dressed in a white bridal gown with a long veil, detailed to reflect the period's fashion. Her groom stands beside her, further in the background, dressed in a dark suit and holding his hat as he observes the act with a contemplative expression. Additional figures, the newlyweds' family members and guests, gather behind the couple, engaging in quiet conversation or observing the ceremony; this crowd includes a little girl who leans over to watch the bride sign the register, perhaps contemplating her own wedding day. The background is a room with dark wood panelling and a window that allows some daylight to illuminate the scene, "casting gentle shadows and highlighting the intimate atmosphere".

This subject and atmosphere is true to form for Leighton.

== Interpretation ==
Signing the Register highlights the couple's contractual commitment to one another; the painting to be a positive reflection of the customs of the time. The social dynamics and expectations of the time are displayed in their postures: the groom stands erect beside the bride as her representative in society; the bride is bent forward in "loving submission", her white dress representing her purity. The women in the background turn towards their husbands, who stand tall facing forward yet gaze at their wives. Dawson Vásquez writes in Evolving Portraits of the Marriage Liturgy that in Leighton's painting "[t]he relationship between couple and society is defined by law, and the obligations are clear".
