= The Straw Ride =

Painting by Lucy Kemp-Welch

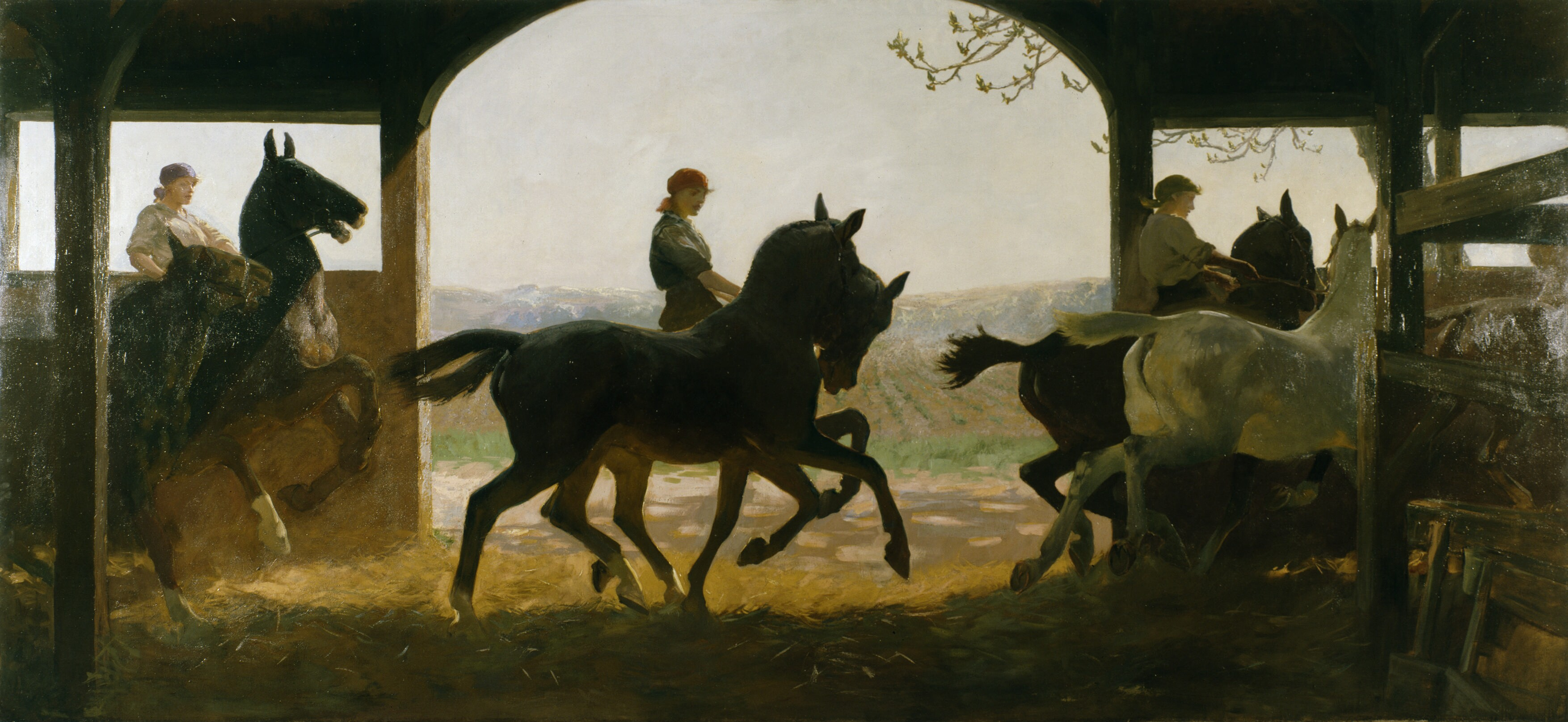
- Artist: Lucy Kemp-Welch
- Year: 1919
- Type: Oil on canvas, war art
- Dimensions: 182.8 cm × 396.2 cm (72.0 in × 156.0 in)
- Location: Imperial War Museum, London

The Straw Ride is a 1919 oil painting by the British artist Lucy Kemp-Welch. It depicts a scene at Russley Park, a historic racing stables in Wiltshire. During the First World War it was used to train remounts for the British Army. Three woman are shown putting the horses through their paces, each riding one and leading another.

Along with Alfred Munnings Kemp-Welch was one of the most celebrated painters of horses at the time. The painting was displayed at the Royal Academy Exhibition of 1920 held at Burlington House in Piccadilly. Today it is in the collection of the Imperial War Museum.

== Bibliography ==
- Caramello, Charles. Riding to Arms: A History of Horsemanship and Mounted Warfare. University Press of Kentucky, 2022.
- Messum, David. The Life and Work of Lucy Kemp-Welch. Antique Collectors' Club, 1976.
- Wortley, Laura. Lucy Kemp-Welch, 1869-1958: The Spirit of the Horse. Antique Collectors' Club, 1996.
