= Royal Academy Exhibition of 1920 =

1920 art exhibition in London

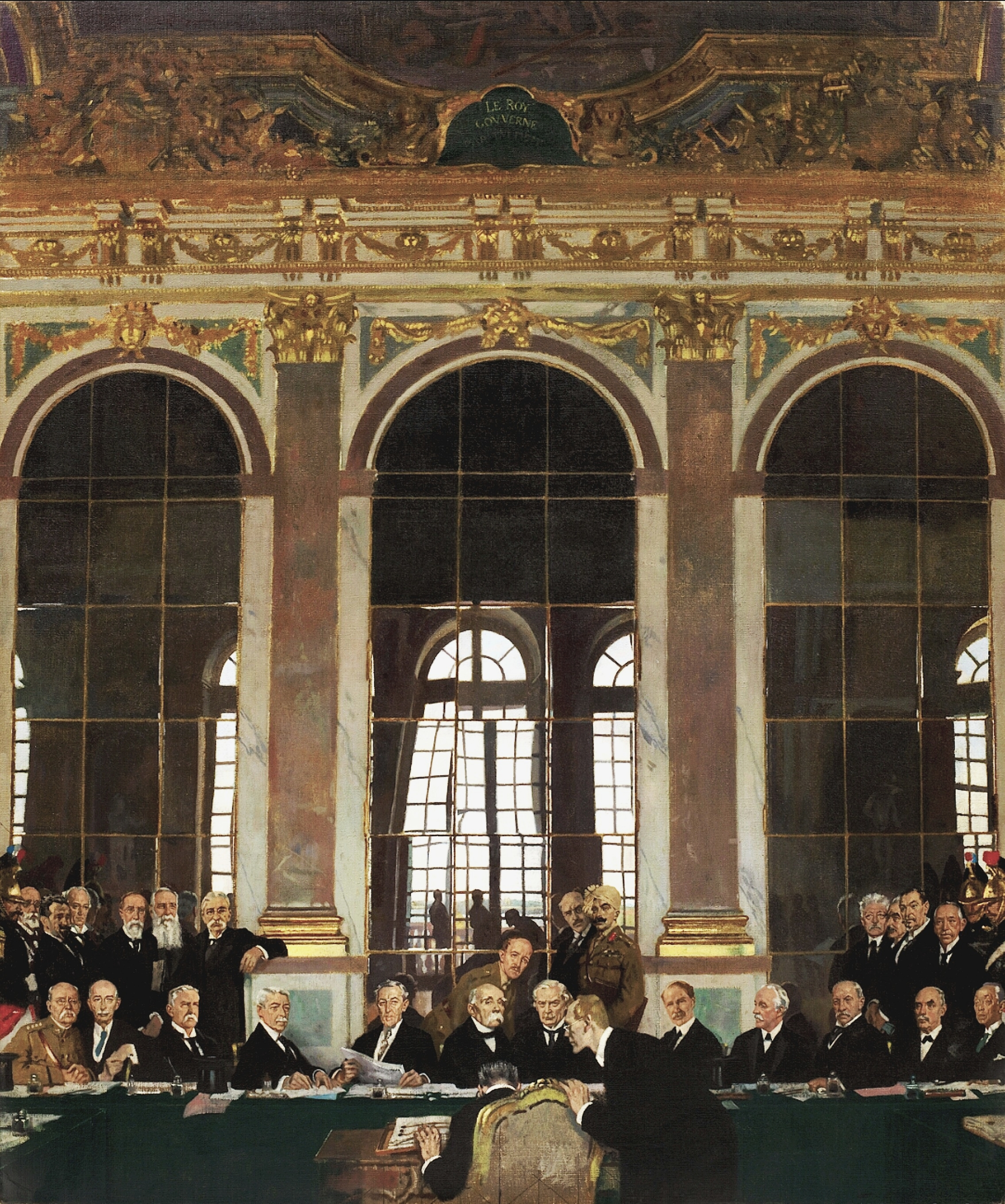
The Signing of Peace in the Hall of Mirrors by William Orpen

The Royal Academy Exhibition of 1920 was the hundred and fifty second annual Royal Academy Summer Exhibition and was held at Burlington House in London's Piccadilly from 3 May to 7 August 1920. It was the second to be held since the end of the First World War and the first of the Roaring Twenties, and attracted 167,000 visitors.

It followed after an exhibition held at Burlington House, The Nation's War Paintings, which had showcased war art. By contrast the subsequent Royal Academy exhibition was seen as a return to pre-war traditions and was described by The Guardian as "no change", although a major alteration was made in the way paintings were displayed by removing the top two lines of pictures. The Irish artist William Orpen exhibited several pictures including two, A Peace Conference at the Quai d'Orsay and The Signing of Peace in the Hall of Mirrors, that had been commissioned by the Imperial War Museum to mark the Paris Peace Conference. Frank O. Salisbury's The National Peace Thanksgiving at St. Paul's was a large mural panel designed for the Royal Exchange, which was prominently displayed.

Bernard Gribble's Scapa Flow, 21 June 1919 showed a scene from the Scuttling of the German fleet at Scapa Flow. Alfred Munnings produced Epsom Downs - City and Suburban Day which was acquired by the Chantrey Bequest. His Impressionistic Tagg's Island shows a champagne picnic on the River Thames, capturing the new post-war spirit. Mark Fisher and Adrian Scott Stokes both displayed their diploma works for their election as Royal Academicians. In portraiture James Jebusa Shannon showed a full-length depiction of Oswald Stoll the theatre impresario and controller of Stoll Pictures film company.

== Gallery ==
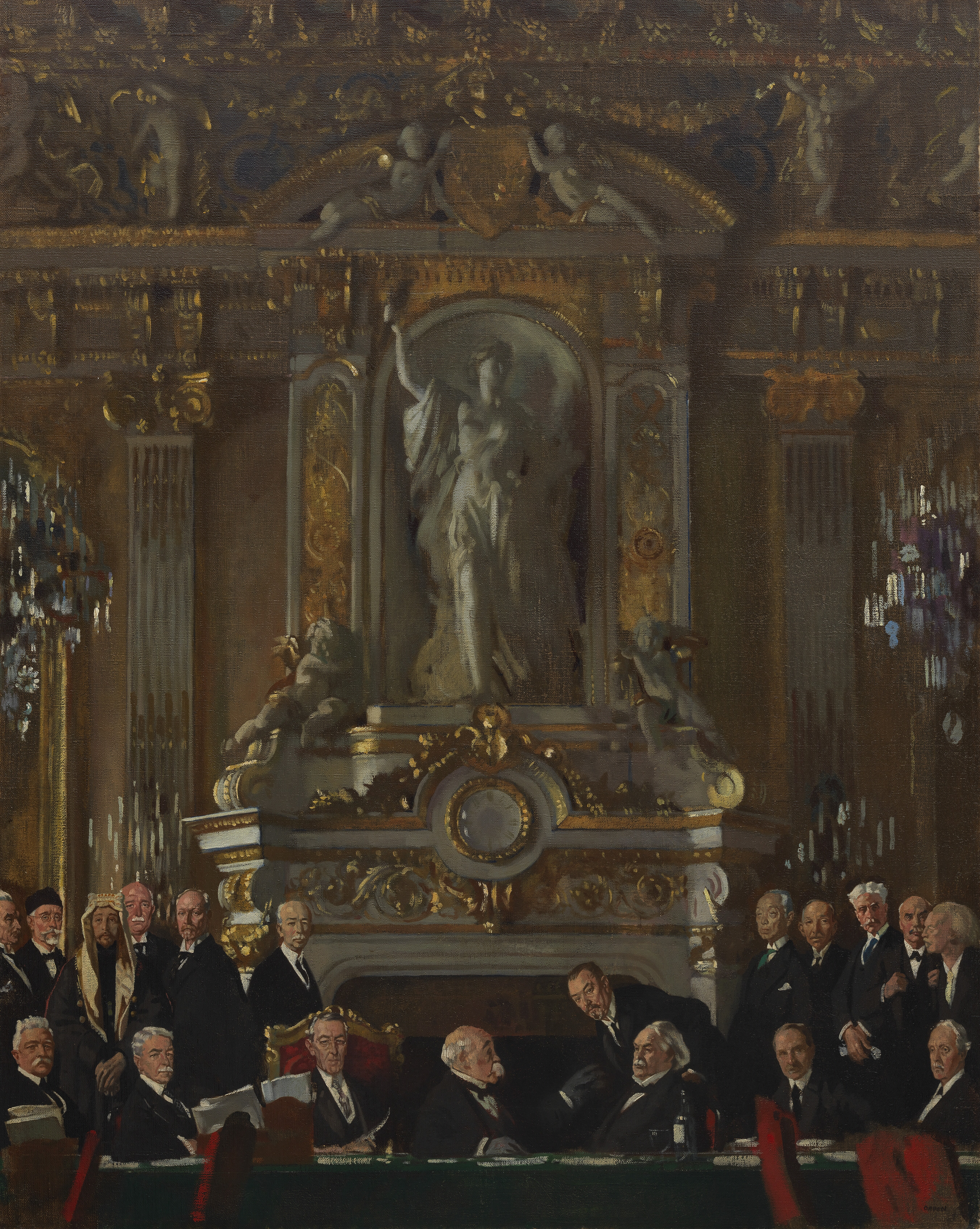
A Peace Conference at the Quai d'Orsay by William Orpen

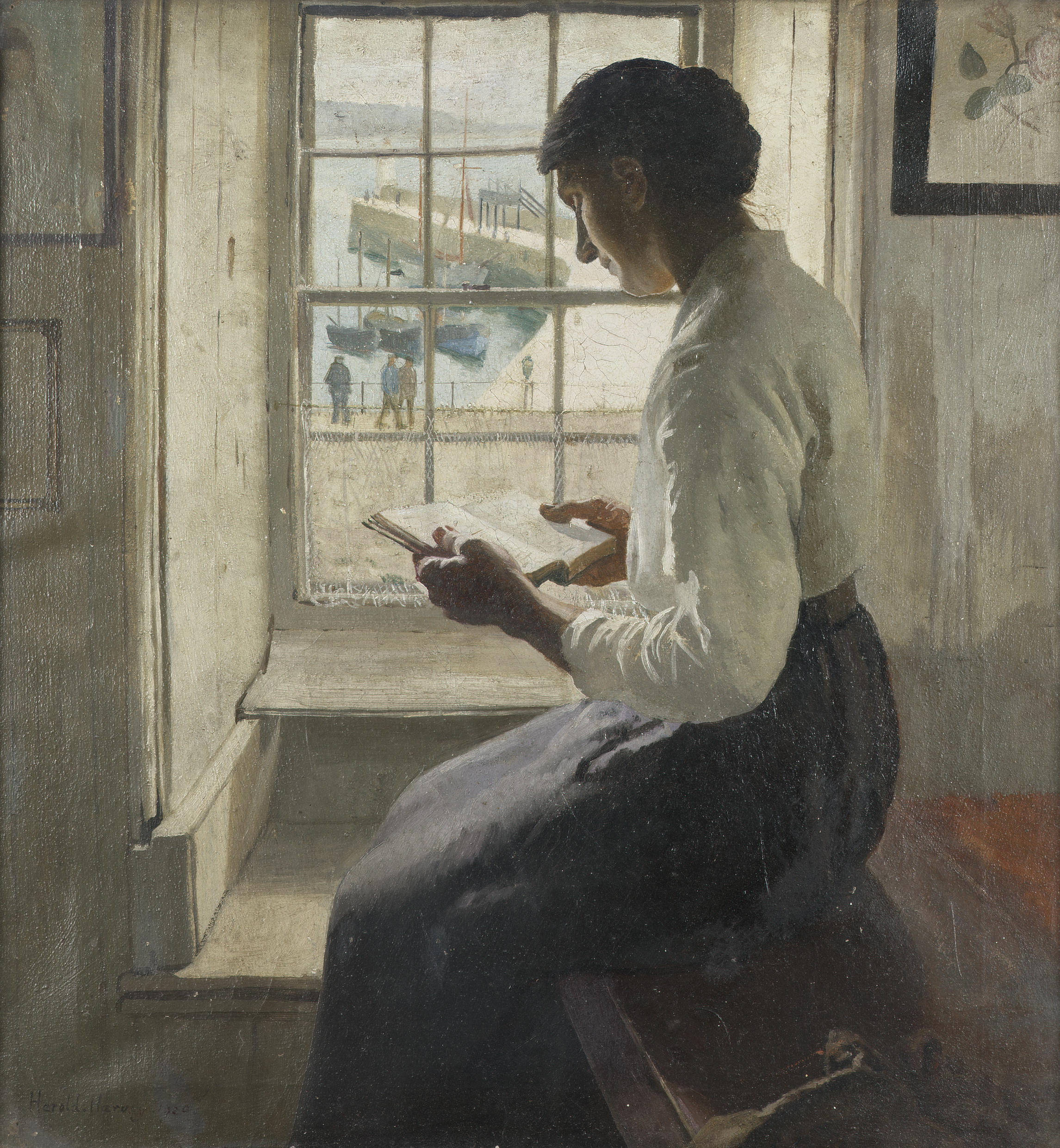
The New Book by Harold Harvey

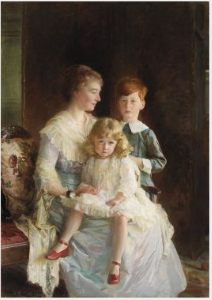
Mrs Milo Talbot with Her Children by William Carter

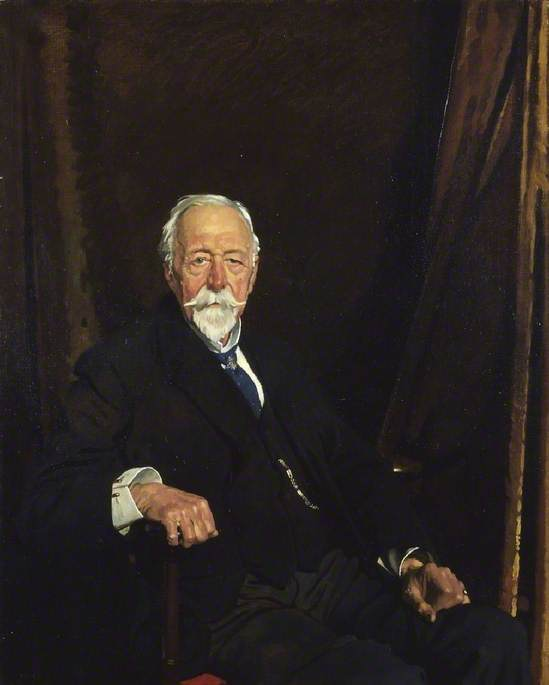
Portrait of Clifford Allbutt by William Orpen

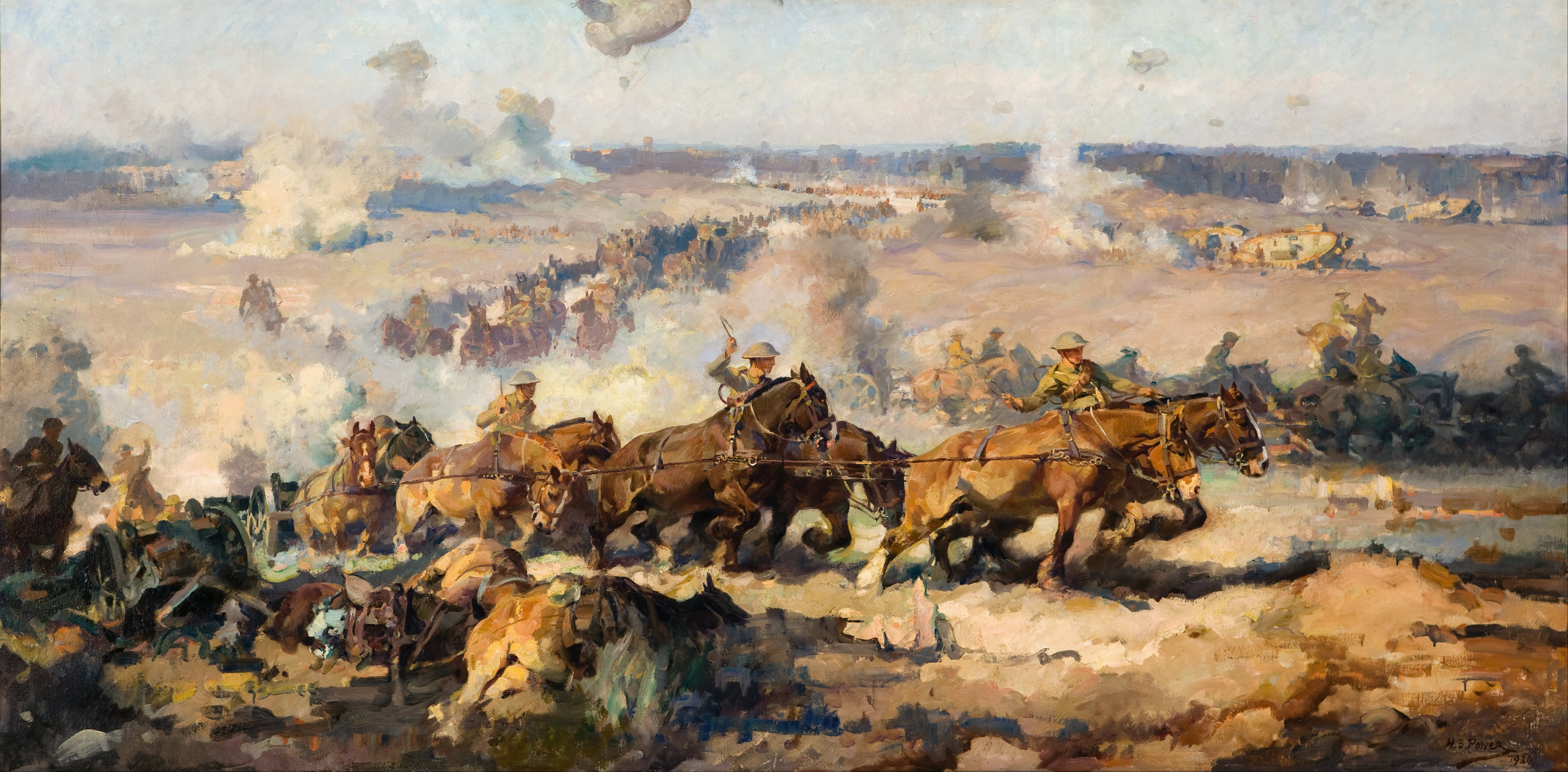
The Battle Before Villers-Bretonneux by Harold Septimus Power

A Provençal Forge by Henry Herbert La Thangue

His Majesty's Mail, Kilnsey Crag by Bertram Priestman

The Voluntary Aid Detachments, Peace Procession by George Harcourt

Yachts Racing In Bad Weather by Alice Maud Fanner

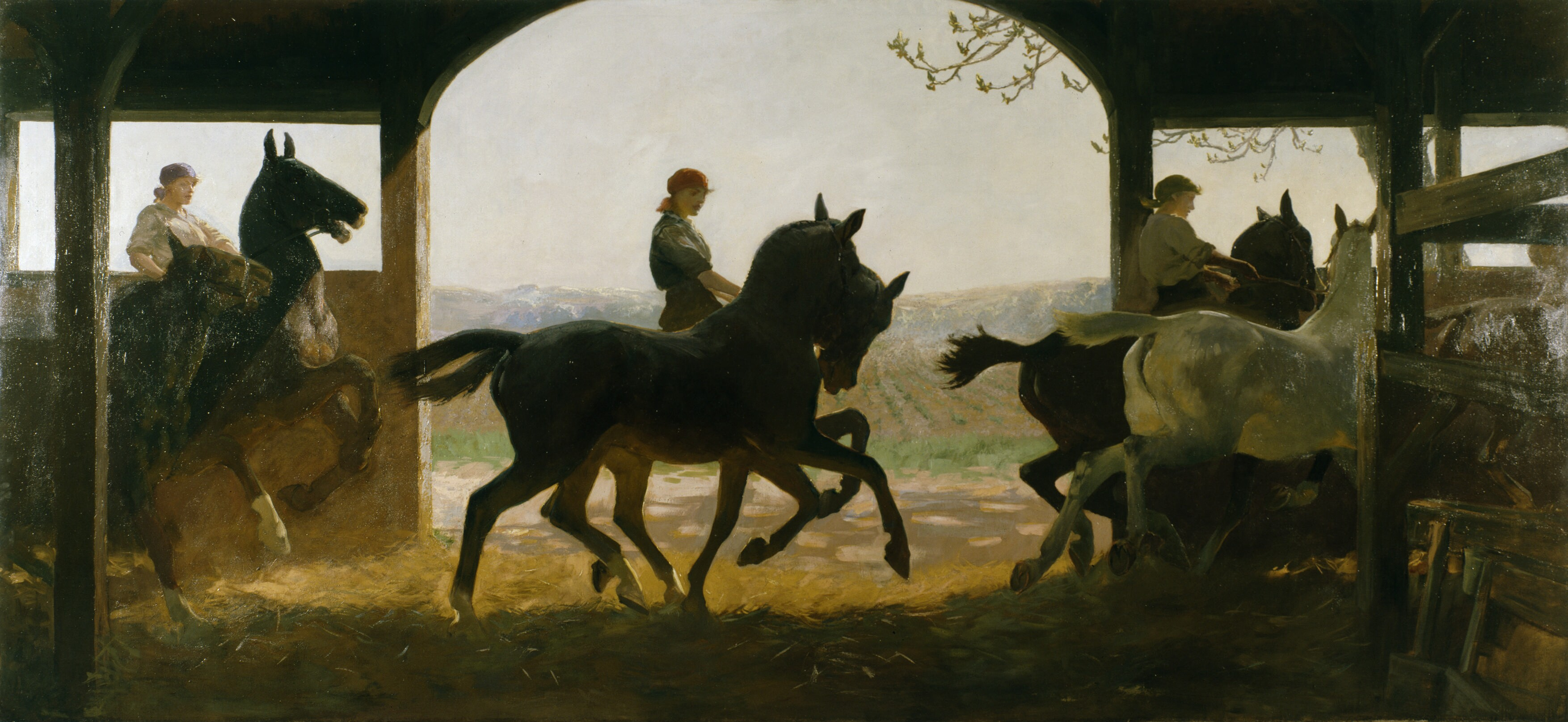
The Straw Ride by Lucy Kemp-Welch

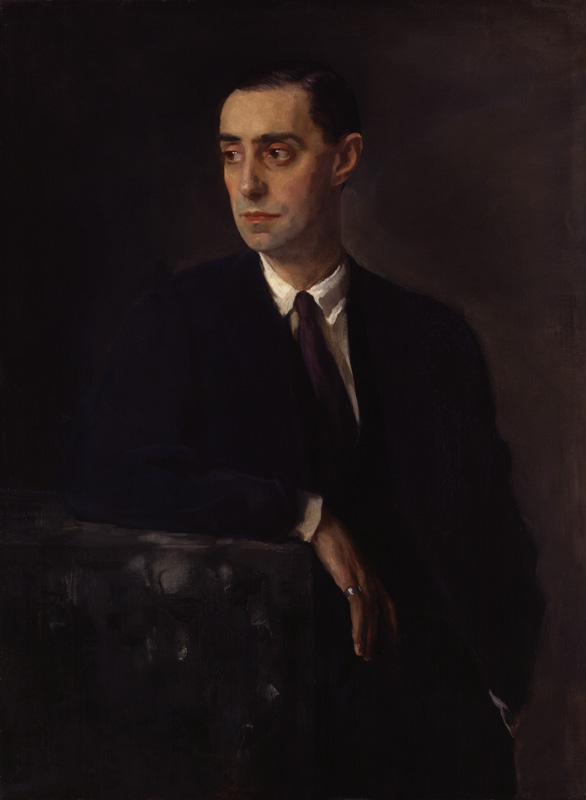
Portrait of Glyn Philpot by Oswald Birley

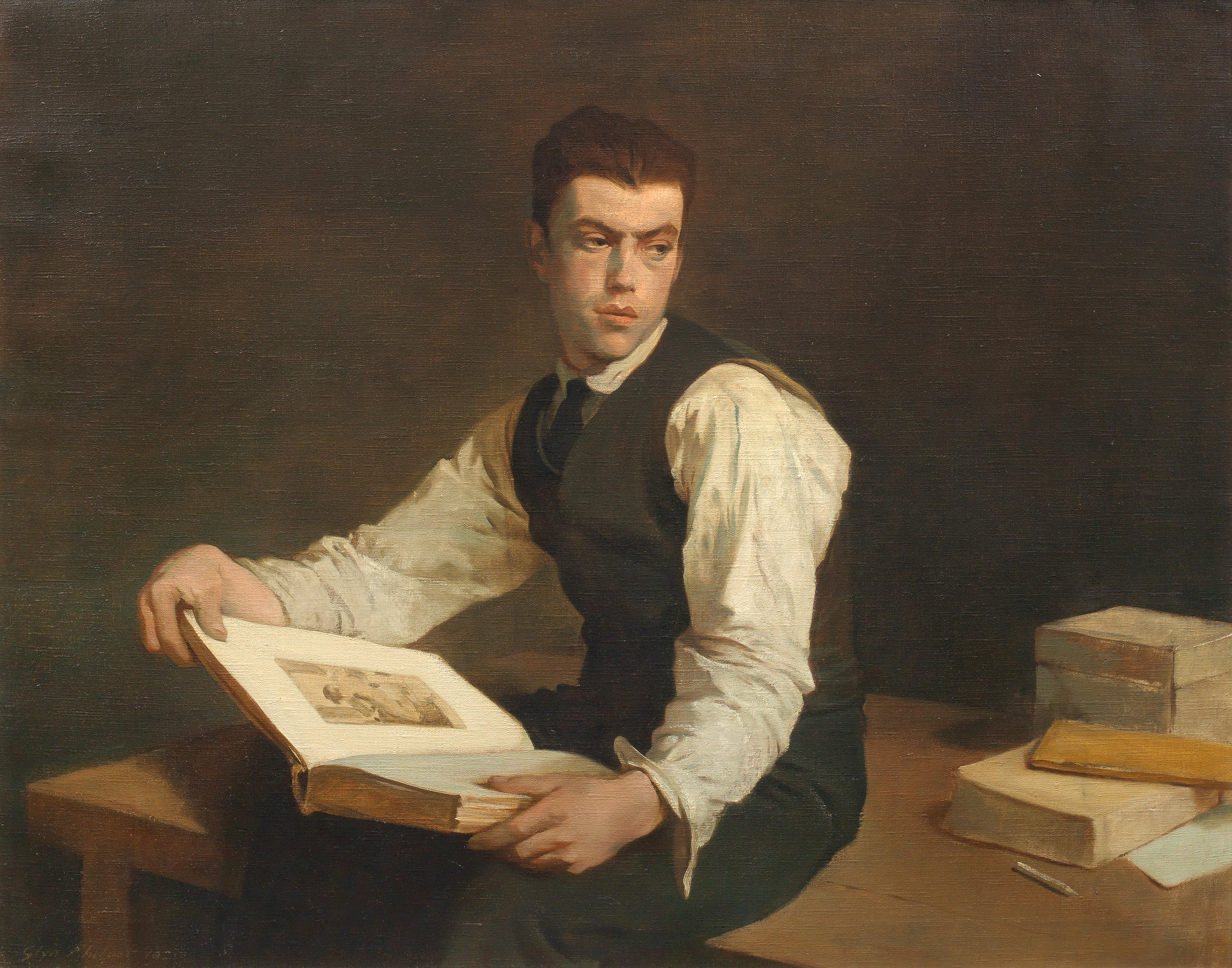
Student with a Book by Glyn Philpot

Recruiting in the Guildhall, London by Fred Roe

August Morning by John Arnesby Brown

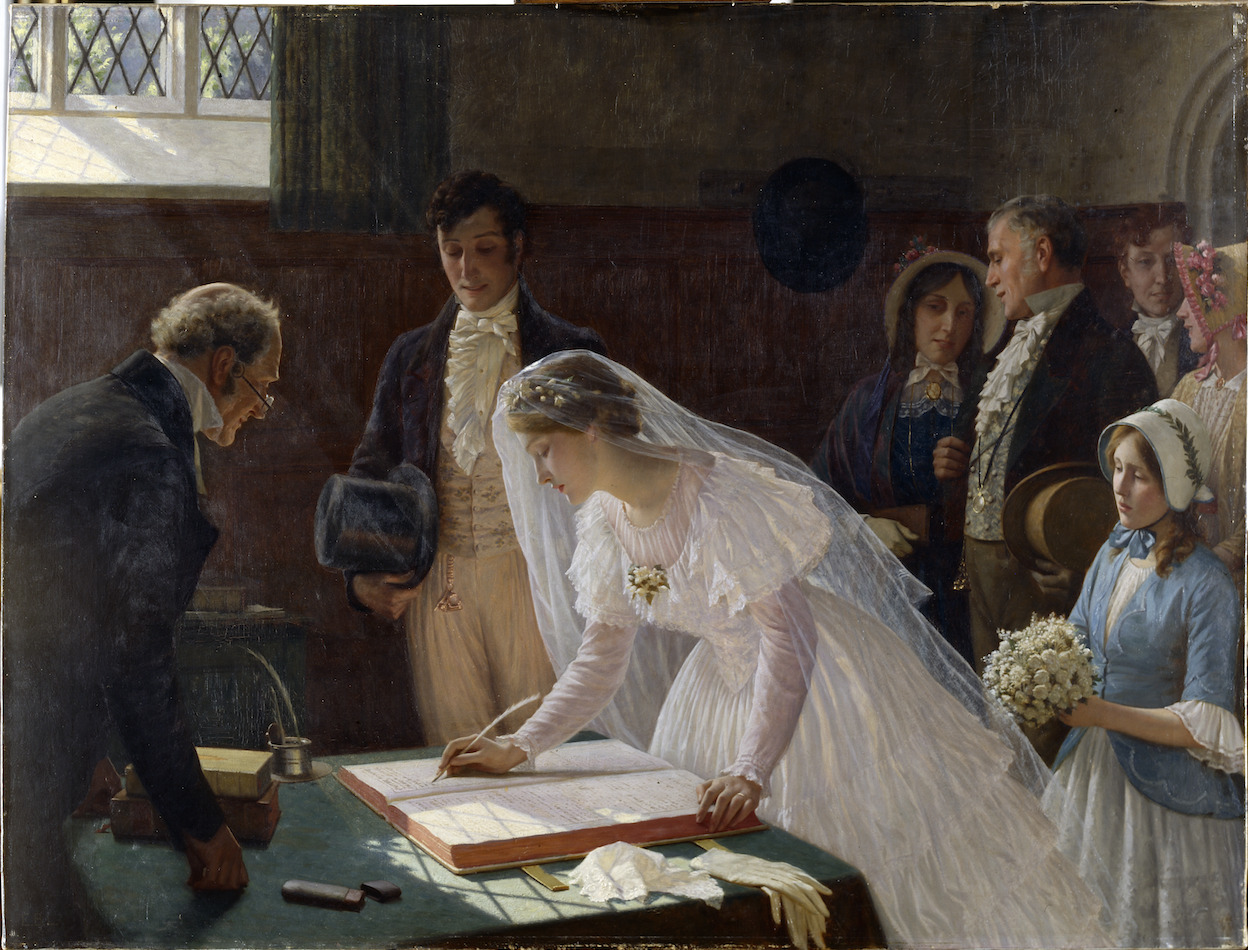
Signing the Register by Edmund Blair Leighton

The Saffron Cake by Stanhope Forbes

An Orchard in Spring by Mark Fisher

The Eve of St Agnes by Frederick George Swaish

The Destruction of HMS Invincible at the Battle of Jutland by William Lionel Wyllie

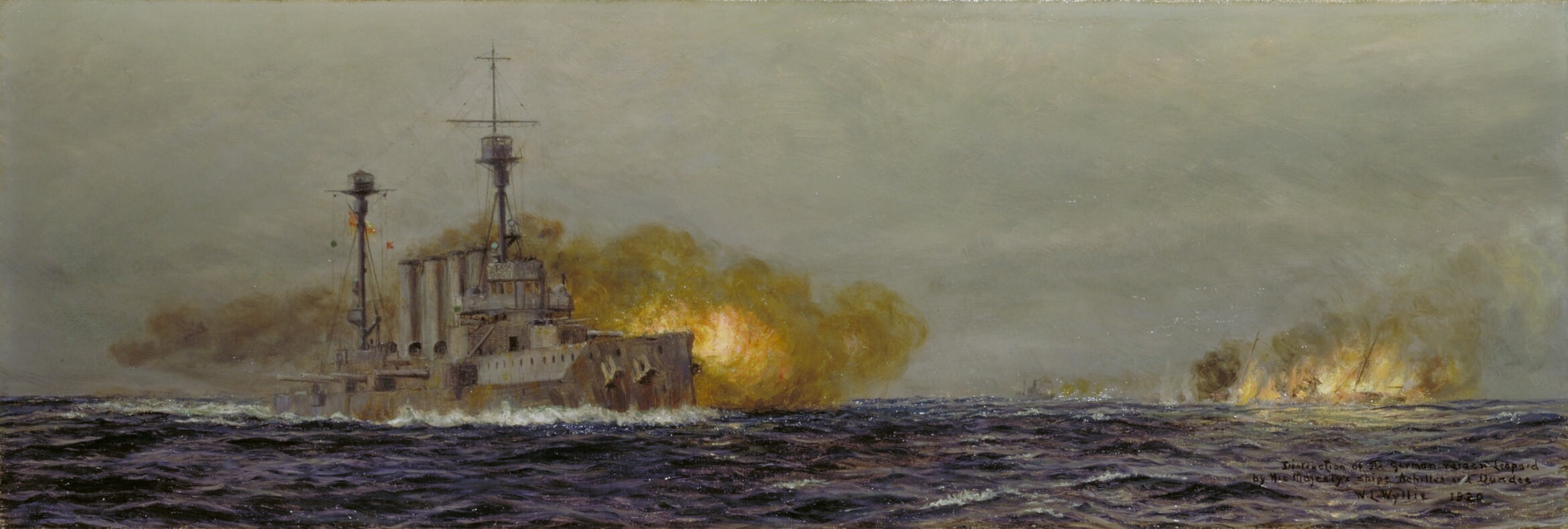
The Descruction of the German Raider Leopard by William Lionel Wyllie

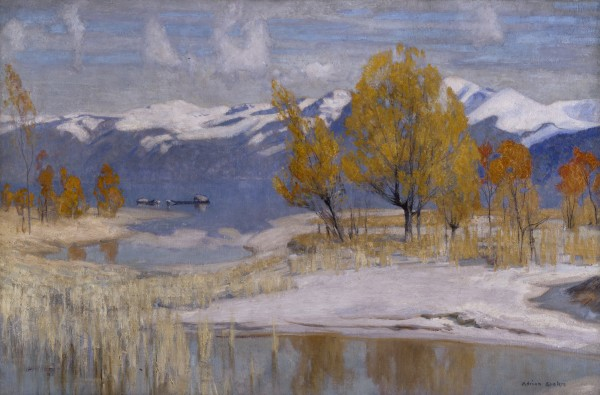
Lago Maggiore by Adrian Scott Stokes

October Morning by Algernon Talmage

A Relieved Platoon of the Gloucestershire Regiment at Hebuterne by Fred Roe

The Sun Fast Sinking in the West by Joseph Farquharson

The Garden, Finzean House by Joseph Farquharson

The Consecration of Reading Abbey by Thomas Becket by Stephen Reid

The Women Stood Afar off Beholding These Things by Robert Anning Bell

Three Wise Kings by George Spencer Watson

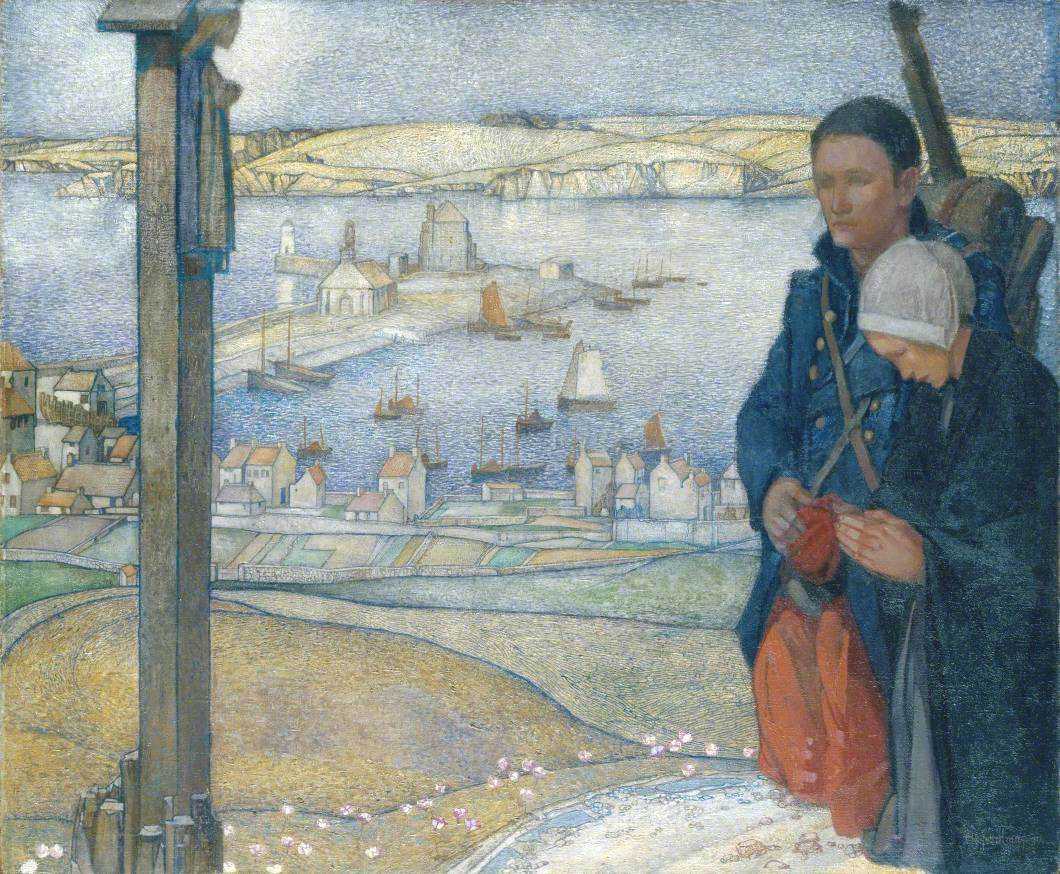
Brittany, 1914 by Edward Reginald Frampton

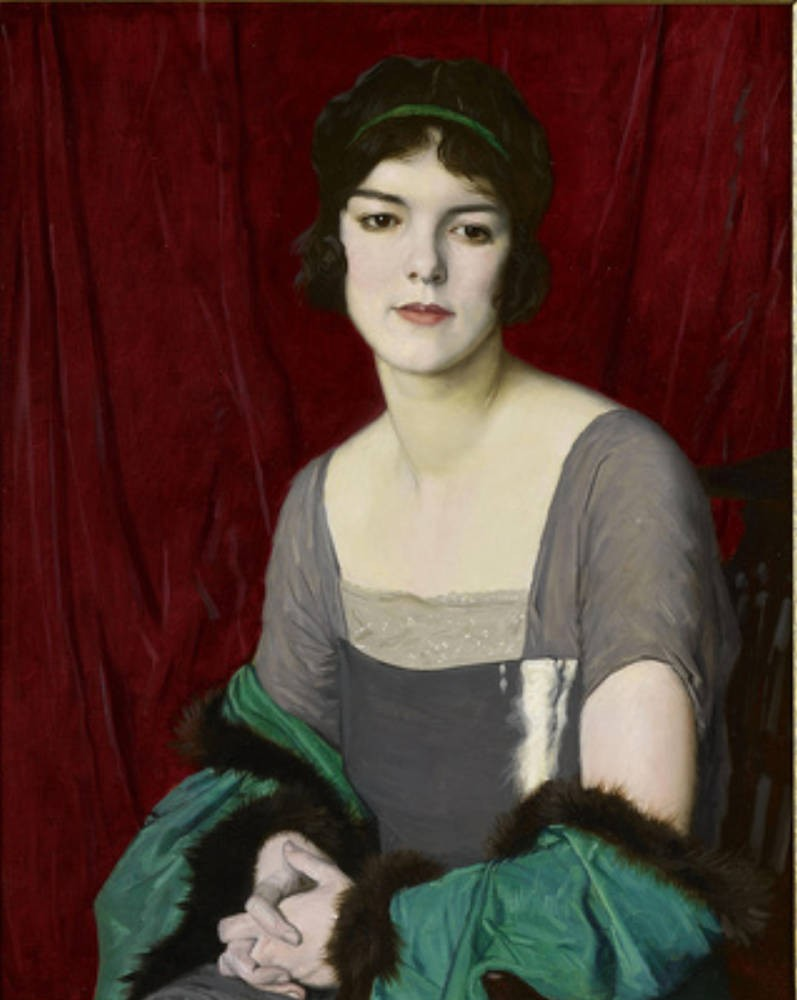
The Green Cloak by William Strang

The Feather Fan by William Strang

Interior of Durham Cathedral by David Young Cameron

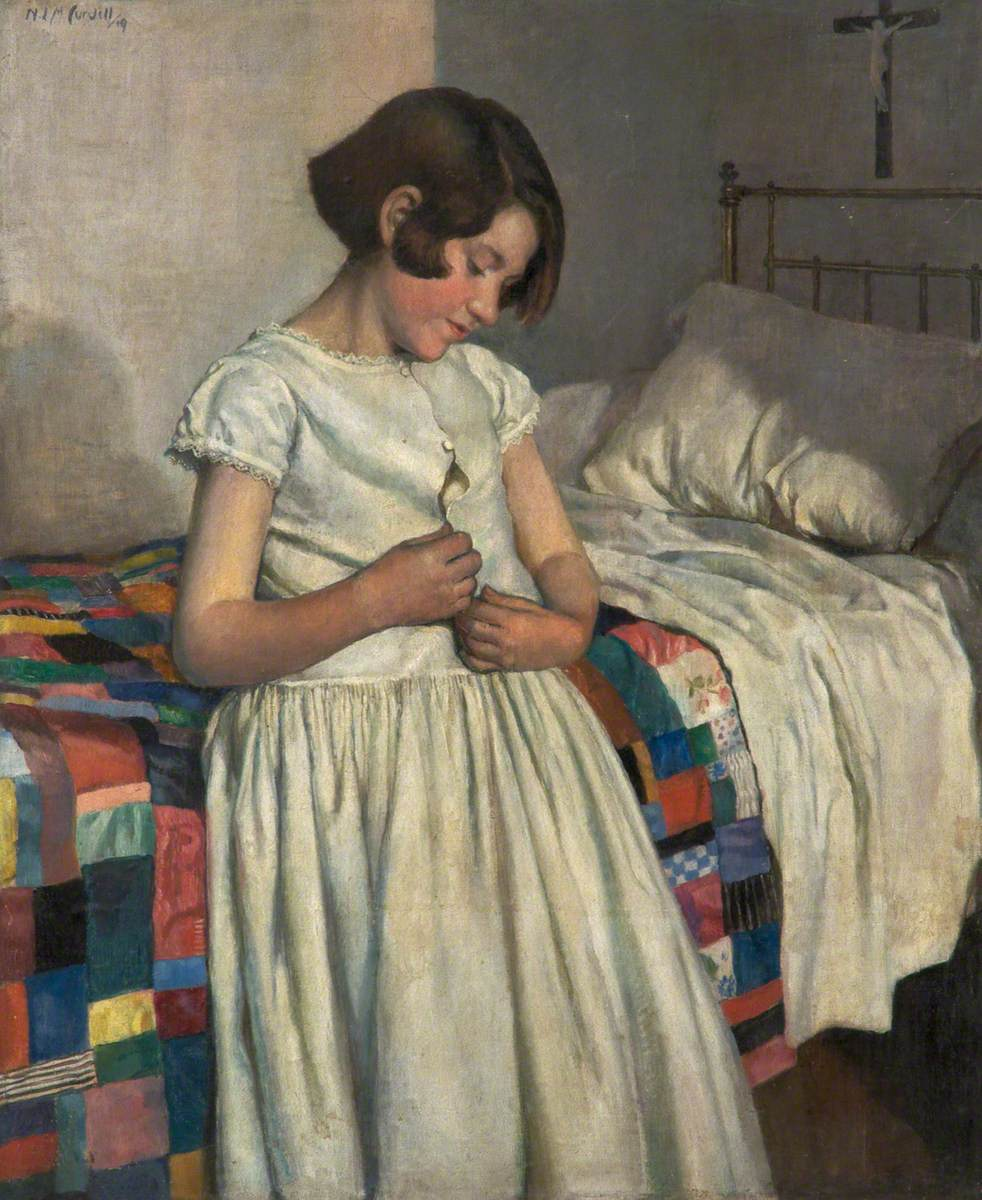
The Patchwork Quilt by Nora Cundell

Scandal by Edgar Bundy

Love Tunes the Shepherd's Reed by Richard Jack

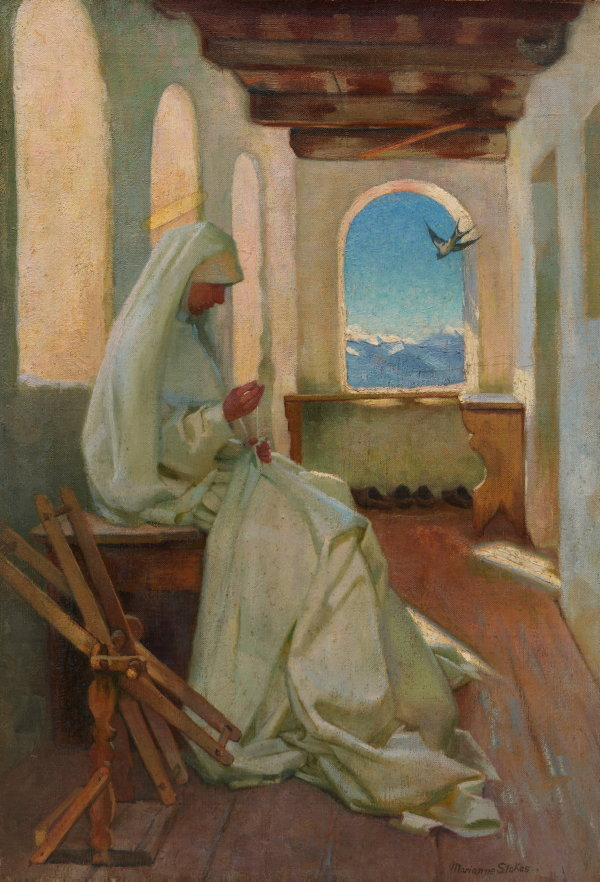
Saint Elizabeth Working for the Poor by Marianne Stokes

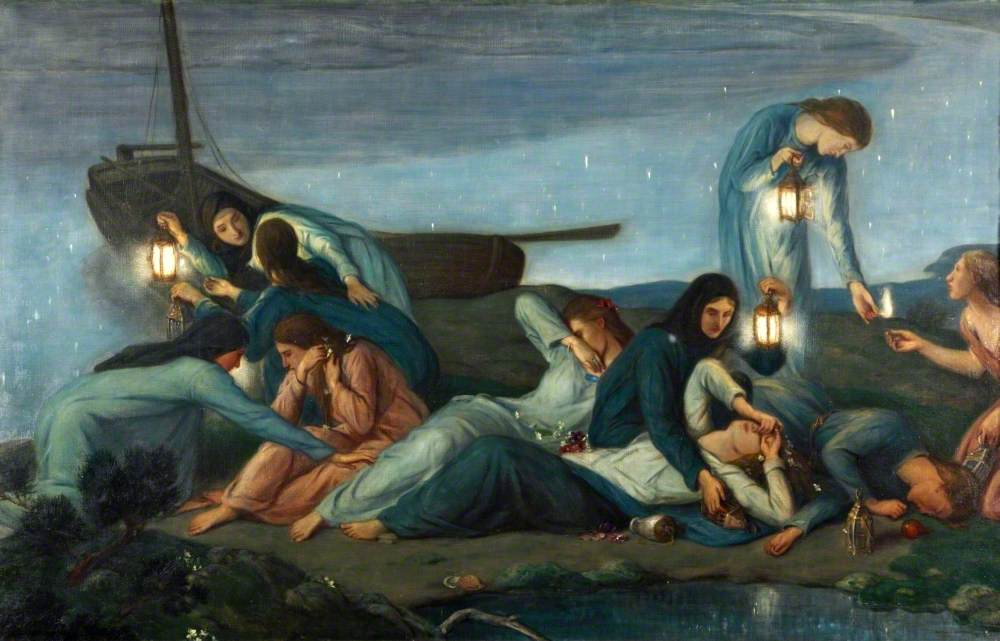
The Wise and Foolish Virgins by Charles Haslewood Shannon

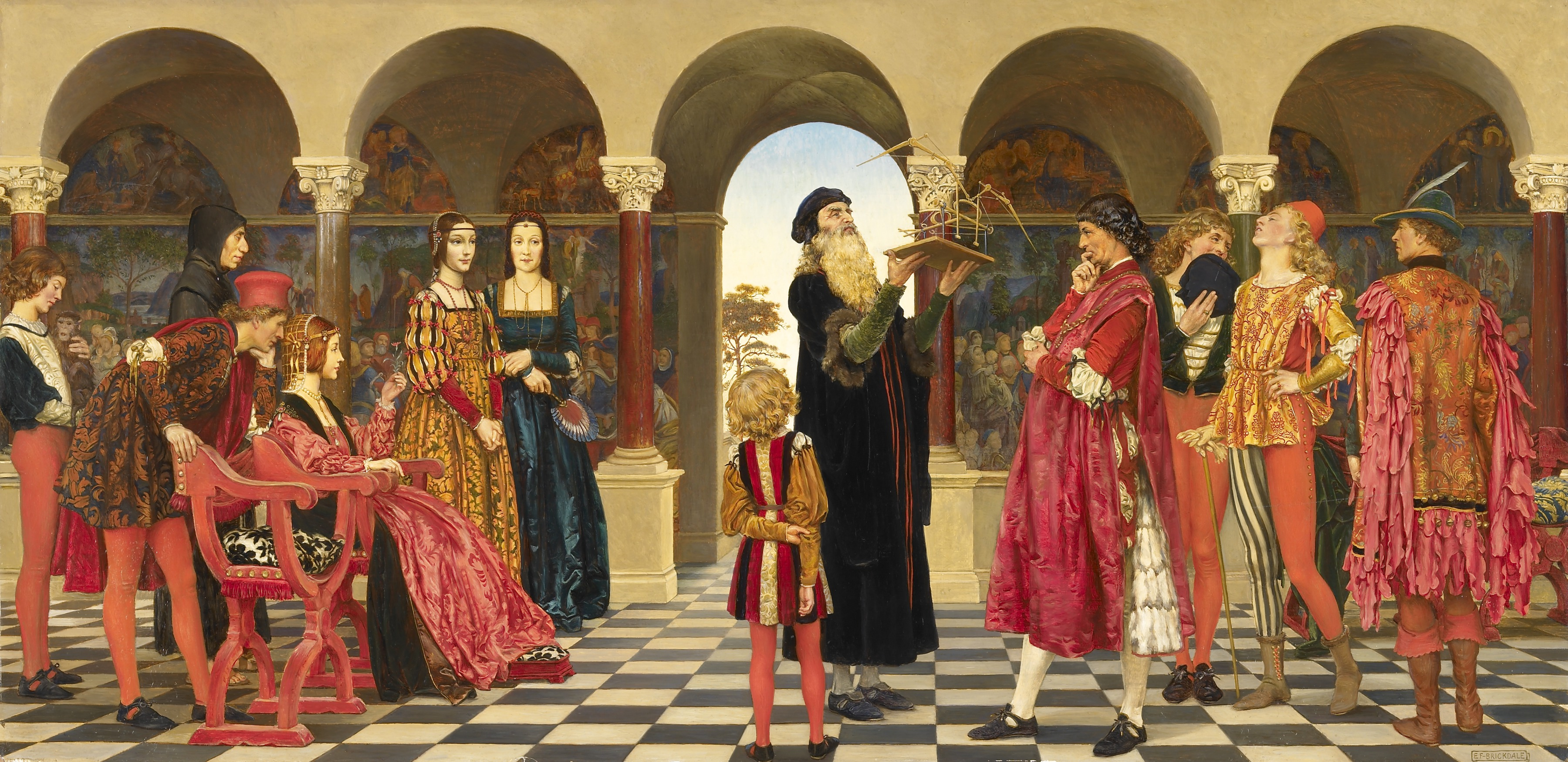
The Forerunner by Eleanor Fortescue-Brickdale

The Royal Horse Guards Retreat from Mons, 1914 by Elizabeth Thompson

Sumer Is Icumen In by Ernest Board

Michael and the Unfinished Sheepfold by Briton Riviere

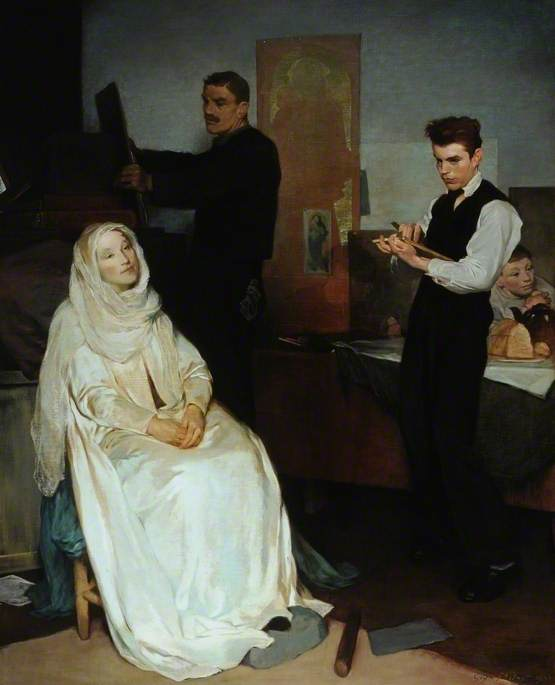
The Rice Family by Glyn Philpot

Mr Minney by Walter Westley Russell

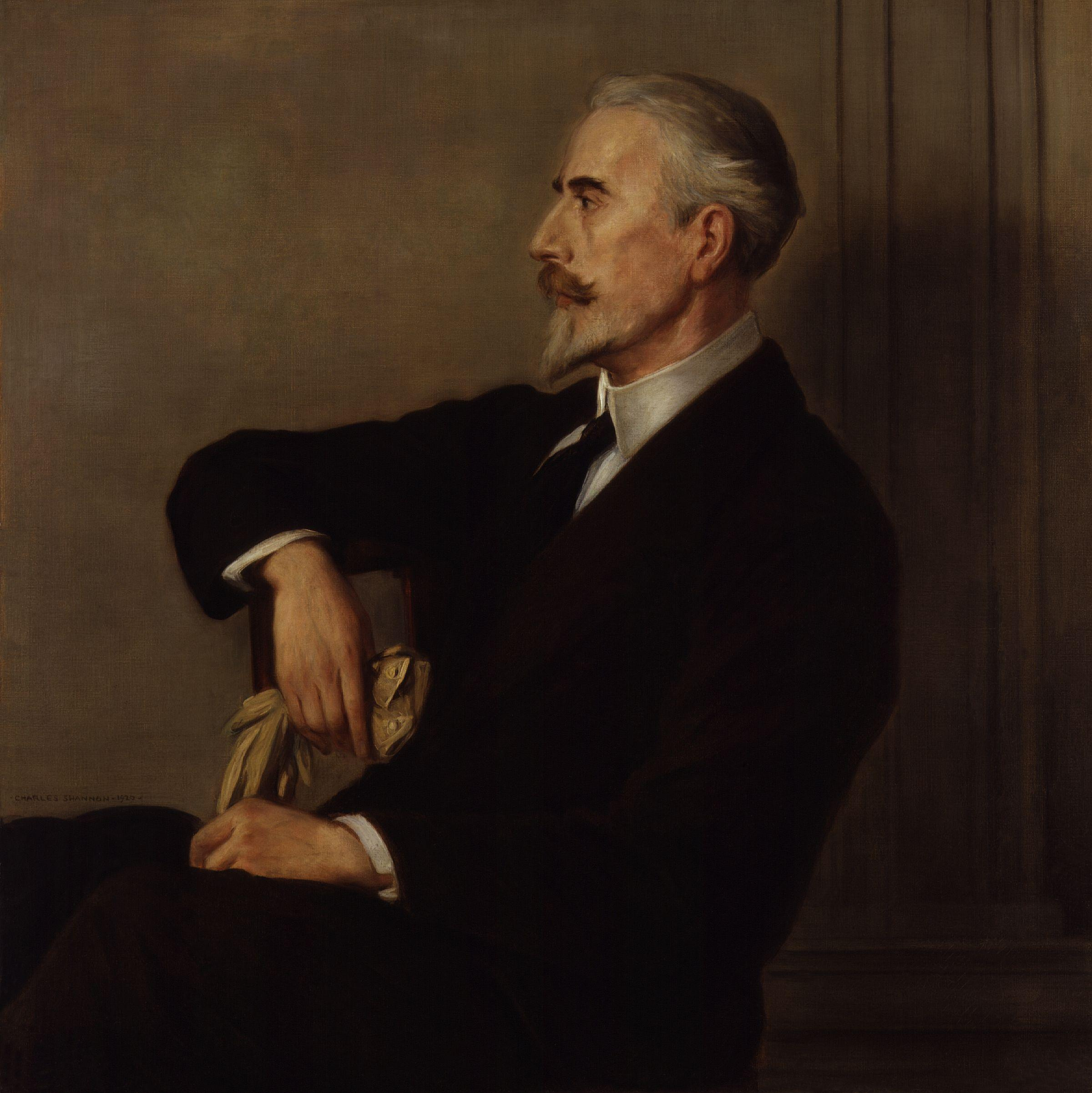
Portrait of Henry Wickham Steed by Charles Haslewood Shannon

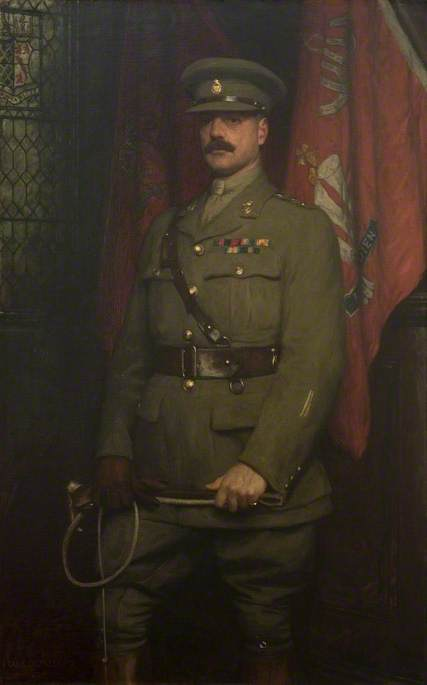
Portrait of Francis Whitmore by Frank Dicksee

Portrait of Percy Dean by Edgar Bundy

Portrait of John Monash by Isaac Cohen

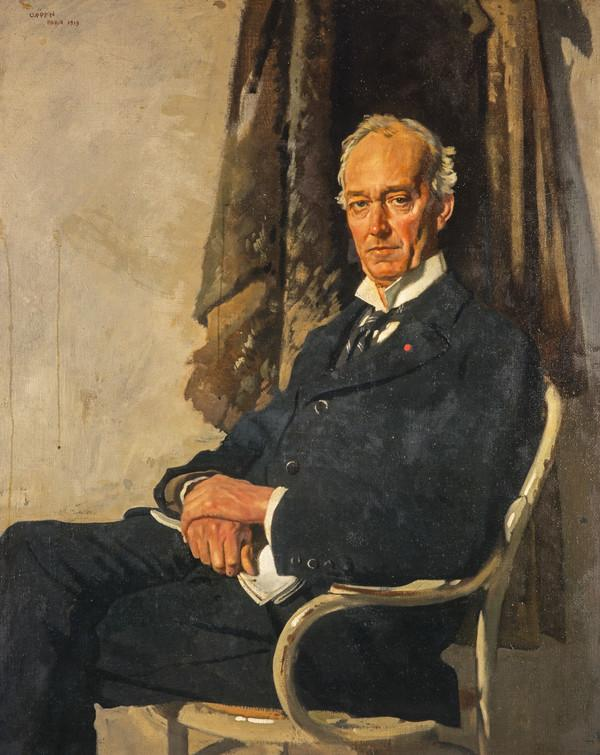
Portrait of Lord Riddell by William Orpen

Portrait of Vivian Hugh Smith by William Orpen

Portrait of Lady Parmoor by John Lavery

Portrait of Lord Kensington by Samuel Melton Fisher

Portrait of Andrew Beauchamp-Proctor by Cowan Dobson

== Bibliography ==
- Spalding, Frances. The Real and the Romantic: English Art Between Two World Wars. : Thames and Hudson, 2022.
- Upstone, Robert & Jenkins, David Fraser. William Orpen: Politics, Sex & Death. Philip Wilson, 2005.
