= Gerda Schmidt-Panknin =

German artist (1920–2021)

- Born: 9 August 1920; Lüchow, Schleswig-Holstein, Prussia, Germany
- Died: 5 March 2021 (aged 100); Kappeln, Germany
- Education: Bremen Art Academy
- Occupation: Painter

Gerda Schmidt-Panknin (9 August 1920 – 5 March 2021) was a German painter. The artist lived and worked in Kappeln. She studied at the Bremen art academy in the 1940s.

== Works ==
Painting was the main media of Gerda Schmidt-Panknin. She preferred to combine oil or acrylic painting with other techniques like crayon. In the paintings of the 1960s to the 1980s she mixed sand and other materials into the paint. Since the 1950s and her first travels to Greece these travel experiences (later to USSR, Scandinavia, Iceland and Greenland) were the main inspiration for her work.

== Influence ==
Due to her practice as art teacher, Schmidt-Panknin influenced many younger artists like Peter Nagel or Nicolaus Schmidt.

== Exhibitions (selection) ==
- 1961 City Museum, Flensburg
- 1962 Stegi Kalon Technon, Athens
- 1969 Städtisches Gustav-Lübcke-Museum, Hamm
- 1969 Apenrade Museum, Apenrade
- 1972 Otto-Pankok-Museum, Hünxe
- 1983 Senderjyland Arts Museum, Tondern
- 1984 National Museum, Reykjavik
- 1985 Kunstsalen, Fredericia
- 1986 Art Gallery Gloria, Nicosia, Cyprus
- 1986 Atatürk Center, Nicosia, Cyprus
- 1990 Art Forum, Kappeln/Schlei
- 1991 Art Museum, Murmansk, USSR
- 1993 Ontario Goethe Society, Toronto, Canada
- 1998 Kunstcentrum "TweeWezen", Enkhuizen, Netherlands
- 2003 Gallery of BASF Schwarzheide
- 2020 Nordfriesland Museum Nissenhaus, Husum (on the occasion of her 100th birthday)
