= Rocco Borella =

Italian painter (1920–1994)

Rocco Borella (22 February 1920 – 23 September 1994) was an Italian painter. He was one of the most famous Italian painters of the avant-garde Italian Art movement from 1950 to 1970. He was also considered a master of color like Mark Rothko. Borella experimented with informal art, minimalism, and rationalism.

Borella was born in Genoa, Italy. He exhibited worldwide. In 1951, 1965, and 1973 Borella exhibited at the Rome Quadriennale; in 1951 and at the São Paulo Biennale; in 1956 at the XXVIII Venice Biennale; in 1964 in New York.

Different masterpieces of Borella's are in VAF Collection, at the Trento and Roverto Museum of Contemporary Art, and at the Contemporary Art Museum of Villa Croce in Genoa.

Since 1946, Borella's art has been exhibited in scores of solo and joint exhibits at galleries throughout Italy, Europe and the United States. The "Rocco Borella" Archive has its headquarters in Genoa. The president is Prof. Giuseppe Martucciello.
