= Murdering Airplane =

Collage by Max Ernst

- Artist: Max Ernst
- Year: 1920
- Type: Photo-collage
- Dimensions: 5.8 cm × 14.3 cm (2.3 in × 5.6 in)
- Location: The Menil Collection, Houston, Texas, USA

Murdering Airplane (1920) is a collage by the German dadaist Max Ernst. Early publications identify this piece as simply Untitled collage. One book, in which Max Ernst made some contributions, identifies the piece as "Untitled or The Deadly Female Aeroplane (L'avionne meurtrière)".

It depicts a monstrous aircraft with human arms flying over an open field. In the lower right-hand corner two soldiers are carrying a third wounded soldier. The Dada movement was created partly as a critical response to World War I. This had a special significance to Ernst who served in the war. This work was a statement on the advent of aerial warfare that occurred in that war.
