= The Tugboat (Léger) =

Painting by Fernand Léger

- Artist: Fernand Léger
- Year: 1920
- Medium: Oil on canvas
- Dimensions: 114.5 cm × 145 cm (45.1 in × 57 in)
- Location: Museum of Grenoble, Grenoble

The Tugboat, painting by Fernand Léger

The Tugboat (French: Le Remorqueur) is an oil on canvas painting by French painter Fernand Léger, from 1920. It is held at the Museum of Grenoble, which purchased it from the artist, in 1928.

== History and description ==
Léger was impressed by the universal exhibitions of the early 20th century. Like Marcel Duchamp, he was inspired by the machines that he saw at the fourth exhibition of aerial locomotion, which took place in Paris just before the First World War.

In December 1919, Léger wrote to his dealer, Daniel-Henry Kahnweiler: “I have used a lot, these two years, of mechanical elements in my paintings. I find there an element of variety and intensity, modern life is full of events for us, we have to know how to use them".

Léger uses an abstraction of colored areas and geometric shapes nested within each other to represent a tugboat. Three men appear in the image, being small and painted in grayscale, they blend into the ship and its environment. One of them, accompanied by his dog, is drawn from tubular shapes. The composition is both vertical and horizontal and no hierarchy is shown: it is a fragmented and colorful vision of the world which seeks to symbolize modernity and technical progress.

As is often the case in the work of Léger, in this painting industrial landscapes are translated into cubic, cylindrical or tubular shapes in bright colors, agreeing with the principles of futurism without sharing its extravagance. The painting Le Remorqueur is an illustration of his desire to use the machine as a potential art medium . Without being futuristic, the work is not cubist either: it represents a narrative subject, retains a third dimension and color has real importance.

In this painting, Léger responds to the monotony of blue-collar work with an attempt to sublimate urban and industrial reality. In the painting, modern man blends into his industrial landscape, an image of the perfect symbiosis between man and the objects that he mass-produces. Léger uses very colorful advertising posters as a model to “give happiness to men by making visible the beauties of the modern world”, playing on the contrast between bright colors and very rigorous geometric shapes.
