= Claire Fejes =

American artist

Claire Specht Fejes
- Born: December 14, 1920; New York City, USA
- Died: October 1998

Claire Specht Fejes (December 14, 1920 – October 1998) was an American artist.

== Early life ==
She was born in New York to parents from Poland and Austria.

== Education and career ==
She trained in anatomy, stone-carving, and sculpture at the Newark Museum, Newark Fine Arts School, and the Students' Art League through the Works Progress Administration.

She married Joe Fejes in 1942 and moved with him to Fairbanks, Alaska in 1946 where her husband took up gold mining. Fejes sketched and painted Alaska Native people, Inupiat and Athabascans. She also wrote books about her travels and life in Alaska. They had a son, Mark (also an artist), and a daughter, Yolande.

Her work is held in several museums, including the Anchorage Museum, Frye Art Museum, the University of Michigan Museum of Art, the Blanton Museum of Art, the Anchorage Museum, the University of Alaska Museum of the North, and the National Portrait Gallery. Her artwork is also on display at the Fairbanks North Start Borough Public Library.

== Later life ==
In her last decade, Fejes spent her winters in New York City and San Diego, and her summers in Fairbanks.

== Bibliography ==
- Cold Starry Night: An Alaskan Memoir. 1996. Epicenter Press.
- Enuk My Son. 1969. Pantheon Books.
- The Eskimo Storyteller. 1999. Edwin S. Hall, illustrated by Claire Fejes. University of Alaska Press.
- People of the Noatak. 1966. Alfred A. Knopf. 1994, re-released by Volcano Press.
- The Villagers: Athabaskan Indian Life Along the Yukon River. 1981. Random House.
