= Daum Marries Her Pedantic Automaton "George" in May 1920 =

Painting by George Grosz

Daum Marries Her Pedantic Automaton "George" in May 1920. John Heartfield is very glad of it.
- Artist: George Grosz
- Year: 1920
- Medium: Mixed media on canvas
- Dimensions: 42 cm × 30.2 cm (17 in × 11.9 in)
- Location: Berlinische Galerie; Berlin

Daum Marries Her Pedantic Automaton "George" in May 1920. John Heartfield is very glad of it. is a painting created by using the combination of pencil, pen, brush and ink, watercolor and collage, by the German artist George Grosz, in 1920. The painting does have an original English title. It is held at the Berlin Landesmuseum fur Moderne Kunst, in the Berlinische Galerie.

== History and description ==
Grosz married Eva Peters on 22 May 1920. This painting reflects his Dada artistic tendency of the time, and is an ironic take on his recent marriage. His wife had been nicknamed by him as Maud, and the title Daum is an obvious anagram of that short form. The scene takes place having an irrealistic urban background that seems inspired by the work of Giorgio de Chirico. His wife is largely undressed, still wearing her hat, appearing reluctant near her husband, Grosz, who appears in a half-human, half-machine form, as a robot or automaton. This is a reference to the dadaist concept of the artist as a kind of machine. The title also mentions ironically fellow Dada artist John Heartfield.

The concept of the painting was explained by Grosz publisher Werner Herzfeld who said that marriage "comes between the bride and groom like a shadow, this fact that, at the very moment when the wife is allowed to make known her secret desire and reveal her body, her husband turns to other soberly pedantic arithmetical problems..."
