= Jacob Ungerer =

German sculptor

Jacob Ungerer (13 June 1840 – 27 April 1920) was a German sculptor and Professor of Fine Arts.

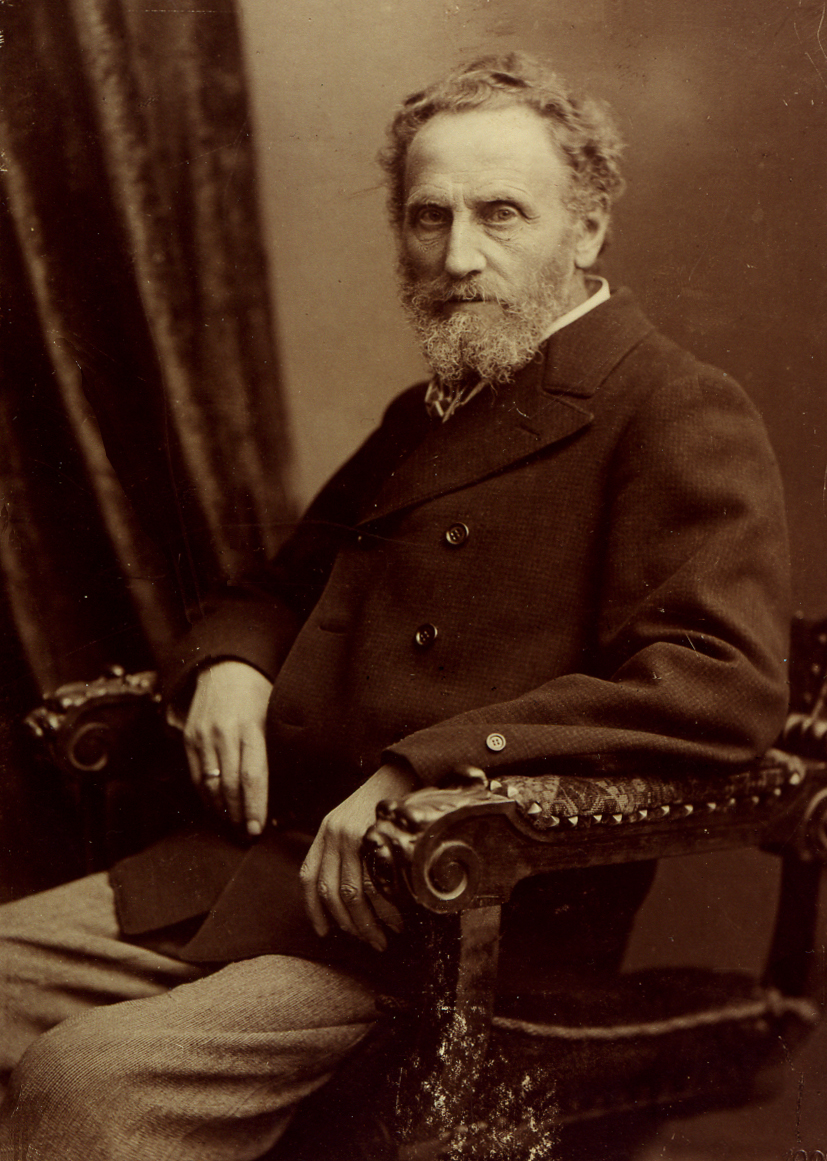
Jacob Ungerer, c. 1900

== Life ==
Jacob Ungerer was born and died in Munich. On his father's side he descended from a family of Munich Cafetiers and brewery owners who had grown rich in the 19th century and who had become technical pioneers (for example, Jacob Ungerer's nephew August Ungerer who in 1886 installed the first Munich Tram Line). Jacob Ungerer's mother came from a glass blower family from Zwiesel.

After leaving school Jacob Ungerer started, in 1858, to study art in the Antique Class of the Royal Academy of Fine Arts in Munich, which he completed in 1864. (Matriculation number 1510). His teacher was the sculptor Max von Widnmann. From 1864 till 1866 he took a study trip to Italy, including a longer stay in Rome. After his return in 1866 he moved into his sculpto studio.

In 1890 he became Professor for Sculpture at the Royal Academy of Fine Arts in Munich. Ungerer died 17 April 1920 in Munich. Almost all his artistic estate, among them many models, paintings and drawings, was destroyed in World War II during an air raid on Chemnitz.

Ungerer's Matriculation register at the Royal Academy of Fine Arts in Munich 1858

== Work ==
=== The Mende Fountain in Leipzig ===
In 1883 in Leipzig, Ungerer created the neo-Baroque figures for the monumental Mende Fountain which was donated by Marianne Pauline Mende. She was a rich widow said to have had a dubious establishment in Leipzig. The Mende Fountain is an allegory of the element Water, depicted as figures from Greek Mythology. The outer basin symbolises the Ocean, the dolphins on the edge are the mouths of rivers which let the water flow into the ocean. The Hippocamps - fable beings half horse, half fish - show the threatening and forceful sides of water. They are kept under control by the Tritons, the sons of Poseidon. The Nereids symbolise the peaceful relationship between water and humans - as a fruitful exchange, as a sign of the usefulness of water for humans. The obelisk as well as the Putti point up to the sky which grants water, in the form of rain, to Earth.

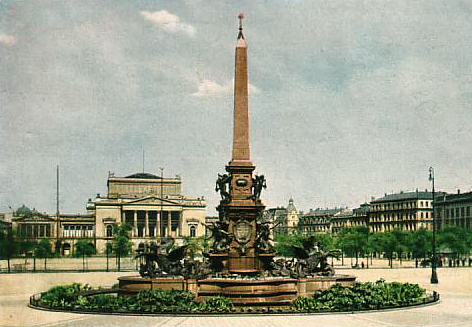
Mende fountain, old view around 1900

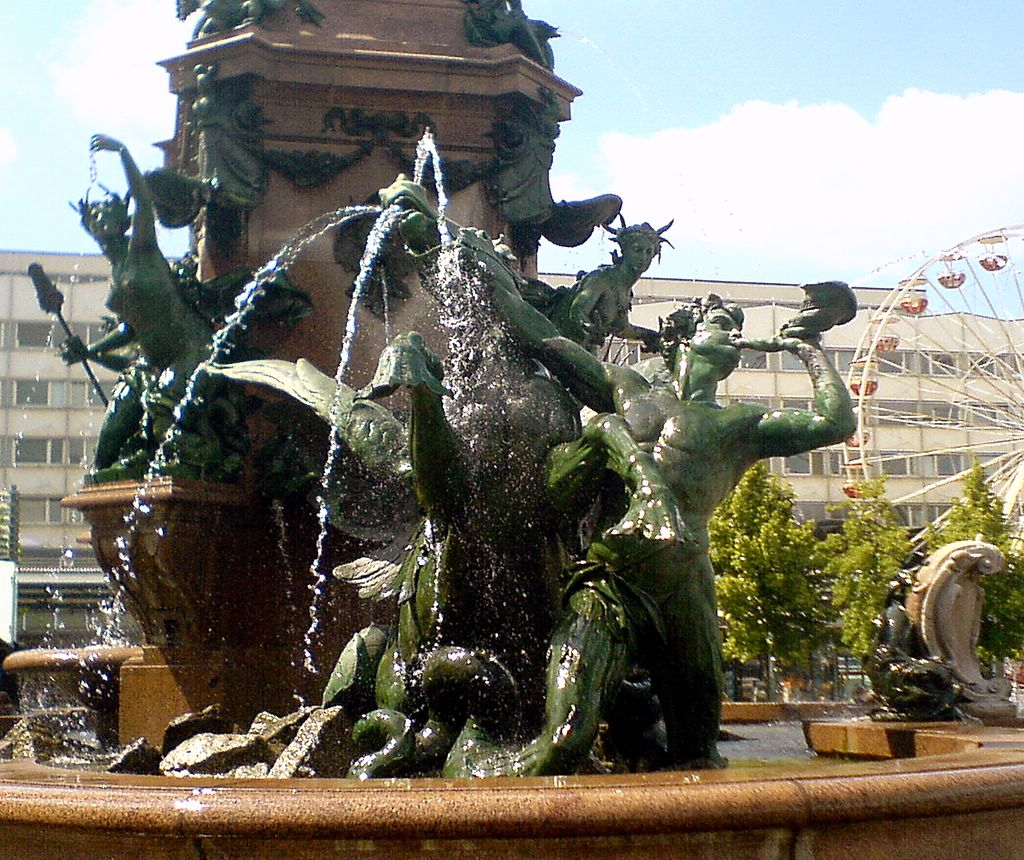
Mende fountain in today's setting

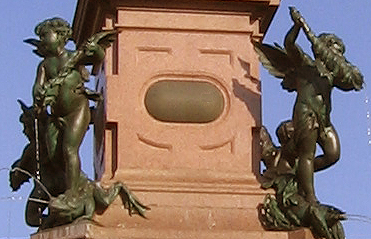
Mende fountain, the Putti
at the base of the Obelisk

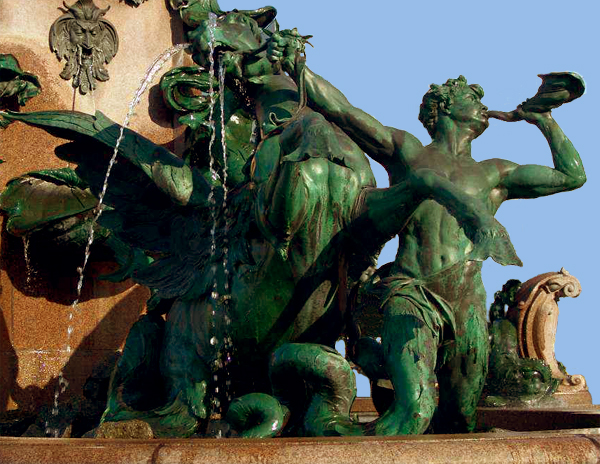
Mende fountain, Triton and Hippocamp

During the time of the Mende Fountain Ungerer also created other sculptures in Leipzig: the sculptures for the Museum of Visual Arts, for the Städtische Gewerbeschule ( today College for Technology. Economy and Culture, Leipzig), for the Royal Conservatory of Music (today the College of Music and Theatre "Felix Mendelssohn Bartholdy" Leipzig) and for the old Grassi-Museum.

=== The Hamburg City Hall Sculptures ===
Martin Haller, architect of the Hamburg City Hall, asked Ungerer in a letter dated 1893 to create "a decorative, richly structured portal, the so-called Bride Gate, to serve young couples as the entrance to the Registrar's Office, should they wish to take the first step into marriage in a more magnificent setting than that offered by our modest Registry Offices which are housed in dirty blocks of flats." Under the God of Marriage Hymen, carrying two torches, there was to be, on the right of the entrance, Adam with his faithful dog and, on the left side Eve with the snake offering the apple. The whole was to be crowned by two turtle doves. Adam and Eve were to be shown “naturally in paradisical nakedness. As the genitals would then be at the eyelevel of onlookers it is recommended that these parts would be covered with a branch as in the naive manner of the Middle Ages." (Source: STAHH 322-1RBK 149). The plans to install also "heads of Bluebeard and Xantippes with the insignia of knife and slipper", as a reminder to the couples, had to be dropped however. "The completion of this work which had been already started by the mason, was denied to us in the strongest terms because images of such horrors might have a negative influence on young couples, perhaps putting them off marriage altogether and would therefore be disadvantageous to the desired increase in the Hamburg population." (Source: Martin Waller, about the building or the Hamburg City Hall, lecture held in the Society for Art and Science on 8th Nov. 1897, Hamburg). The figures for the Bridal Gate were completed in 1896. Apart from that Ungerer also created the statue of Charles V, Holy Roman Emperor, for the Emperors Gallery for the facade of Hamburg City Hall. Plans for a Registry Office in the City Hall were, however, turned down by the Hamburg Senate. Therefore, no bride ever walked through the Bridal Gate.

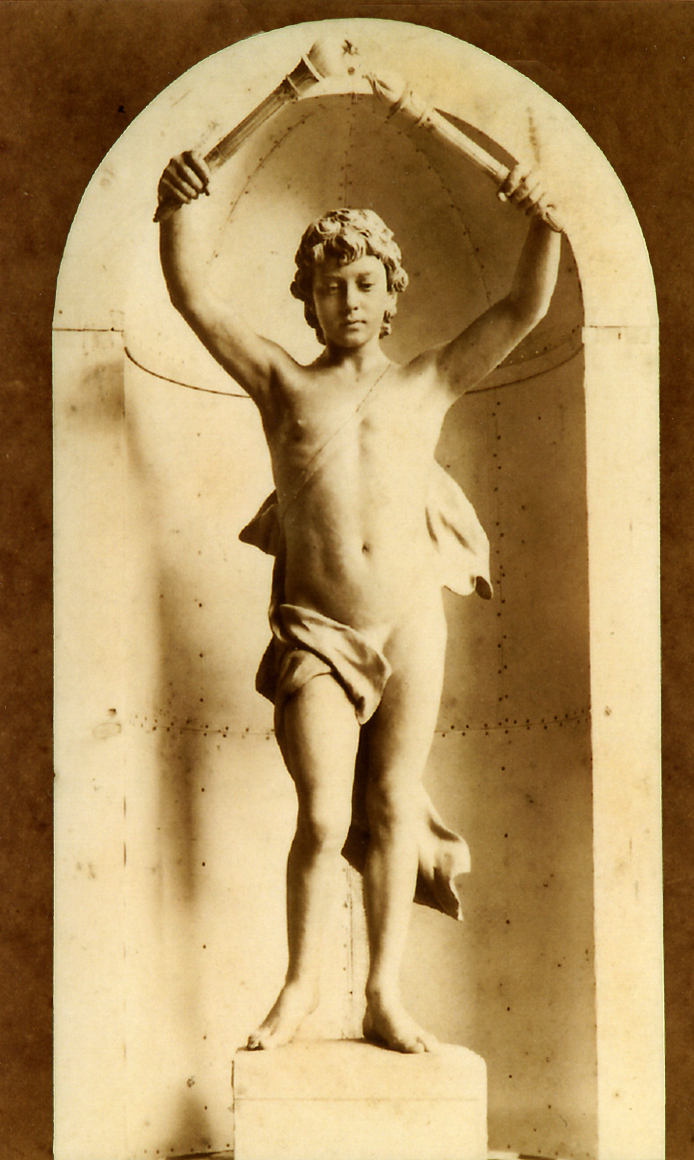
Hymen (Bridal Gate, City Hall Hamburg)

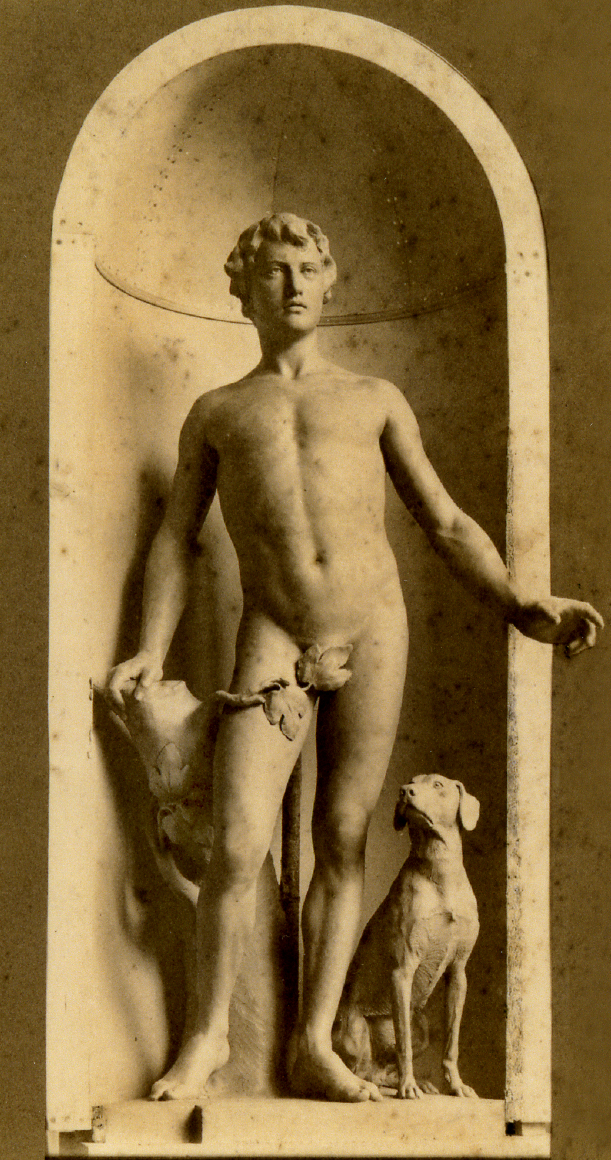
Adam (Bridal Gate, City Hall Hamburg)

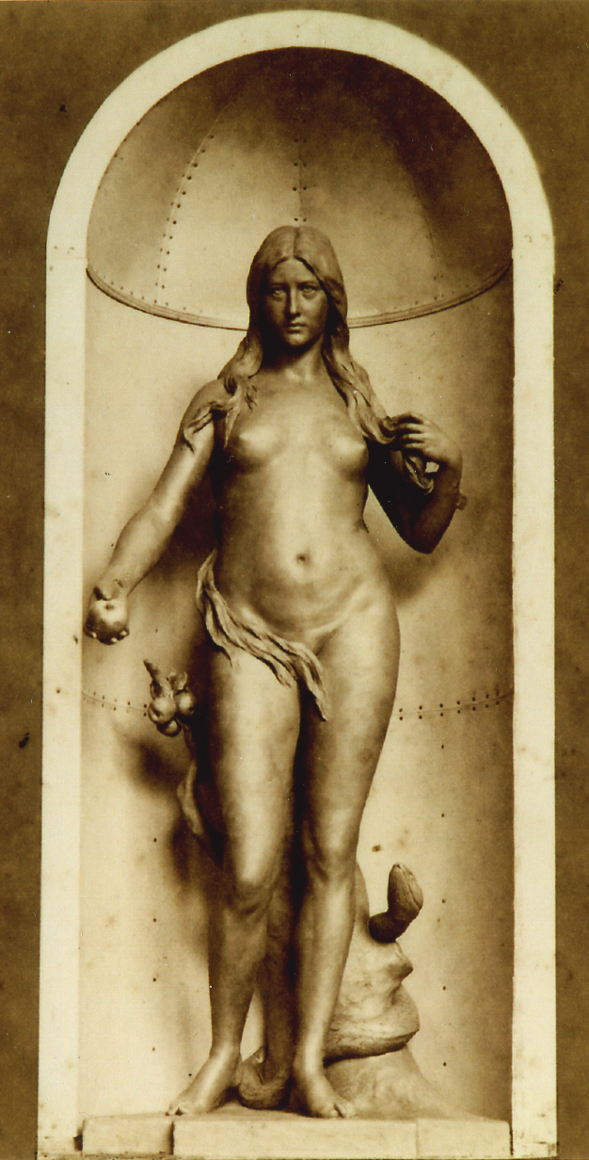
Eve (Bridal Gate, City Hall Hamburg)

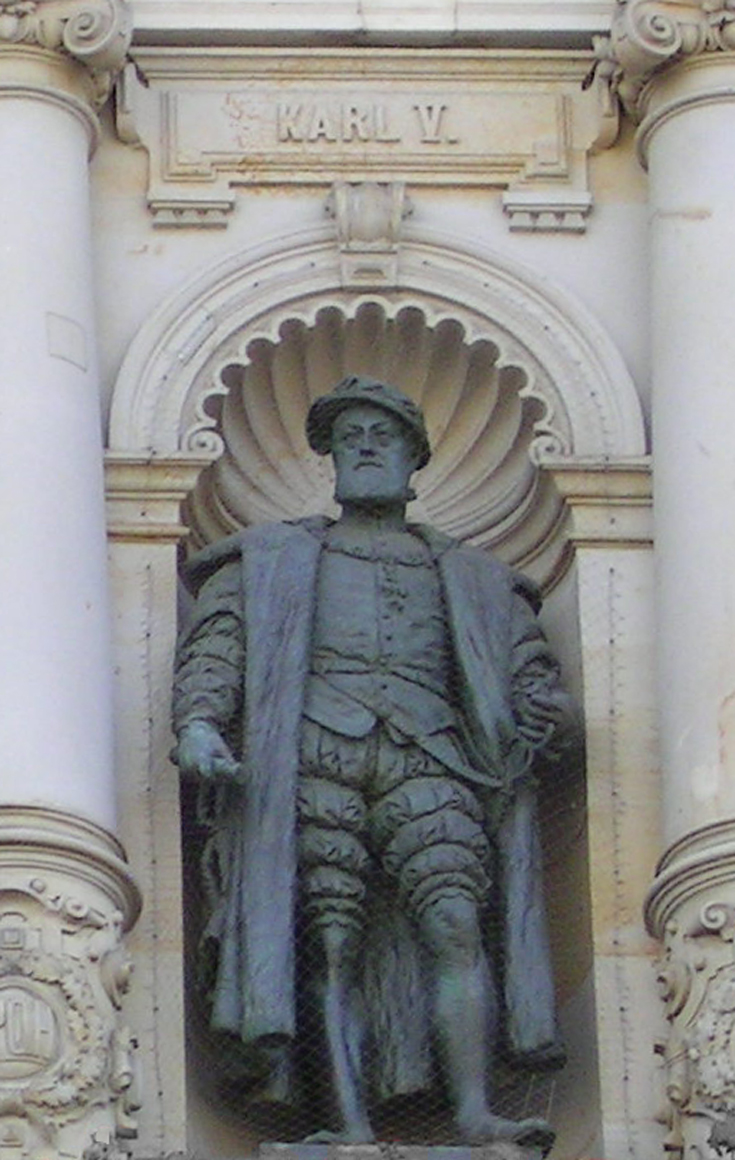
Charles V (Emperors Gallery, City Hall Hamburg)

=== Works in Munich and in Linderhof Castle ===
Ungerer also created figures for various public buildings in Munich such as the Palace of Justice, erected by Friedrich von Thiersch (1897), 4 Apostles for the altar of St. Ursula church. No details are known about the works by Ungerer for Linderhof Castle.

=== Works for the Porcelain Manufacture in Meissen ===
For the Porcelain Manufacture in Meissen, Ungerer designed several figures in 1902, such as the "Gardener Girl with Dog", "Gentleman with Dog", "Gentleman with Field glasses and Walking Stick", "Elegant Lady with Fan", "Lady with Cat" and "Goose Girl”.

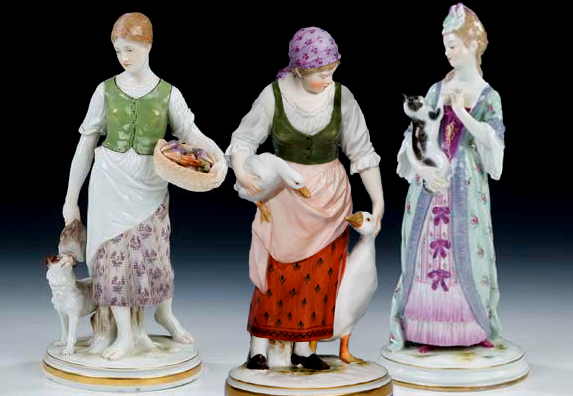
Figurines by Jacob Ungerer: „Gardener Girl with Dog“, „Goose Girl“, „Lady with Cat“, 1902

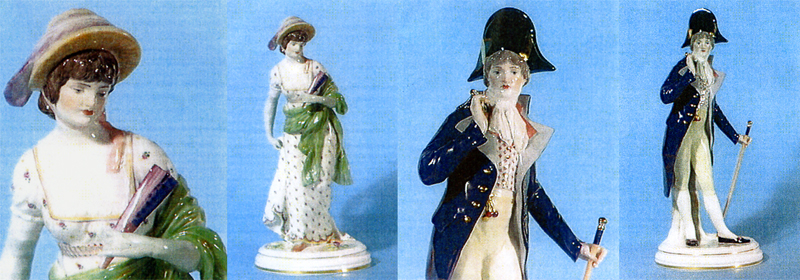
Figurines by Jacob Ungerer: „ Elegant Lady with Fan“, „Gentleman with Field glasses and Walking Stick", 1902

== Honours ==
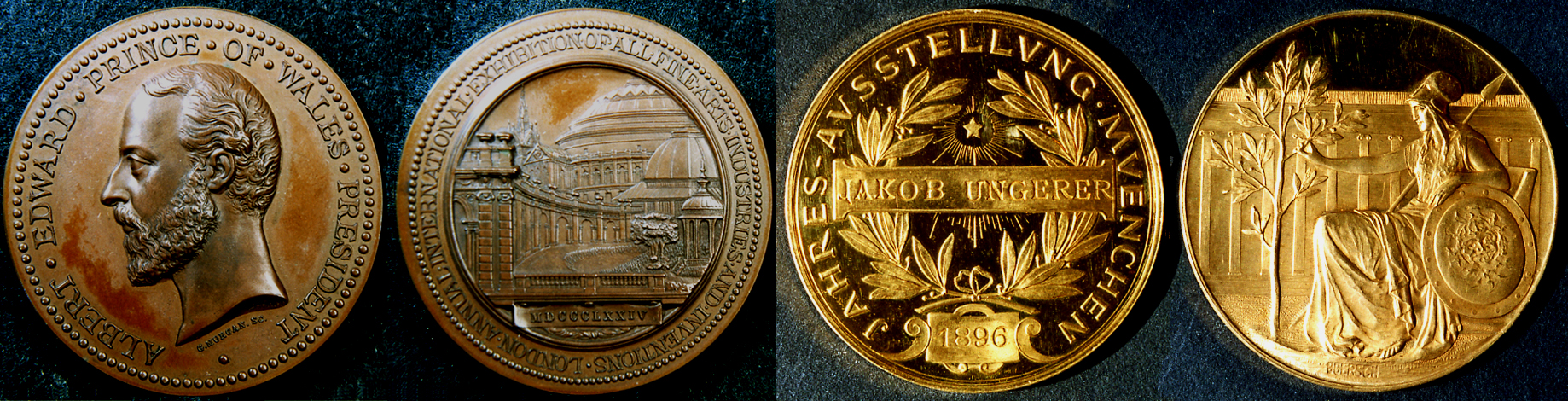
Prize Medals

- 1874 Ungerer participated in the International Exhibition of all Fine Arts, Industries and Inventions in London and received a Prize Medal from the President, Albert Edward, Prince of Wales.
- 1896 Ungerer received a gold medal in the Yearly Exhibition of Munich Artists.
