= Fred Roe =

British artist (1864–1947)

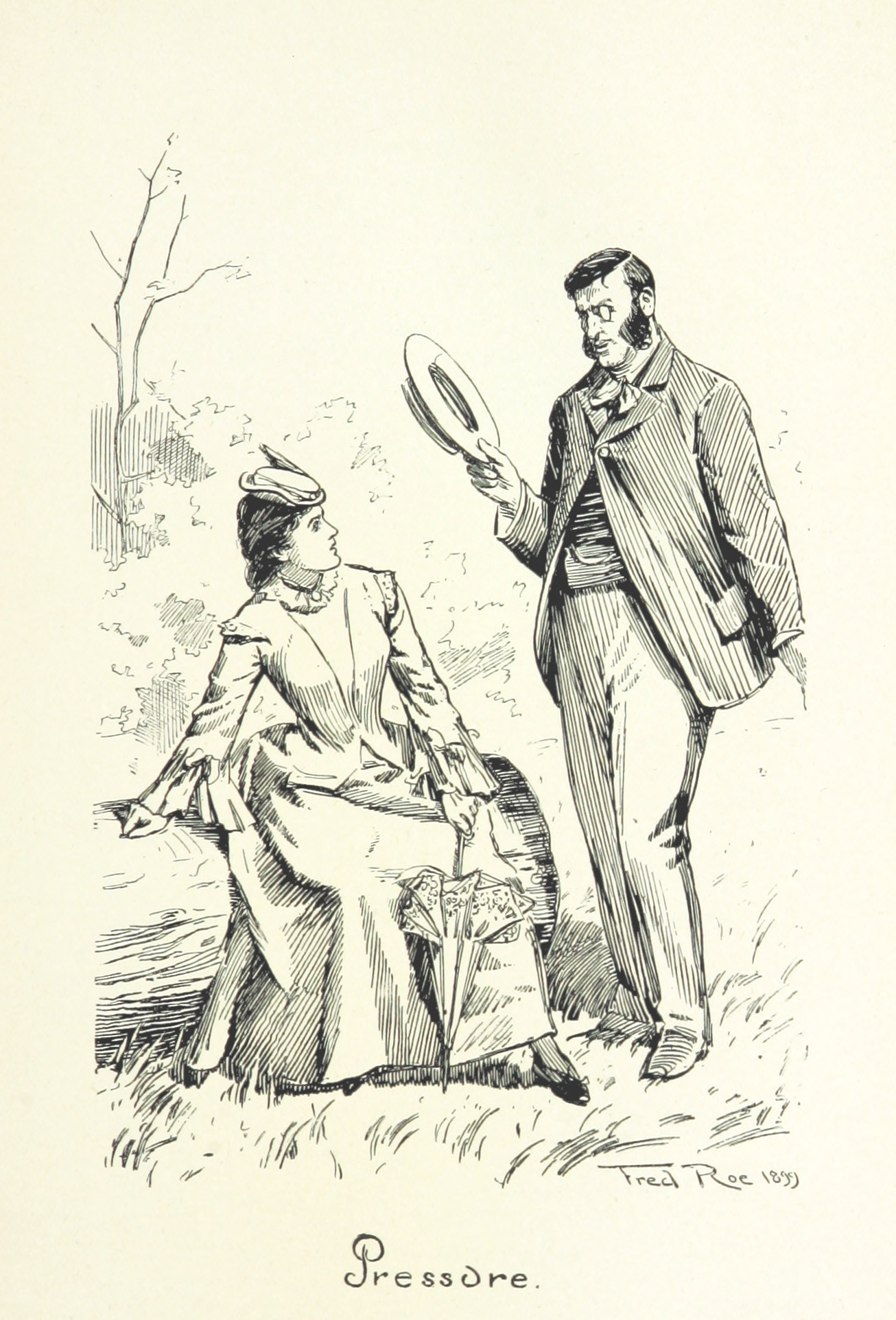
Pressure

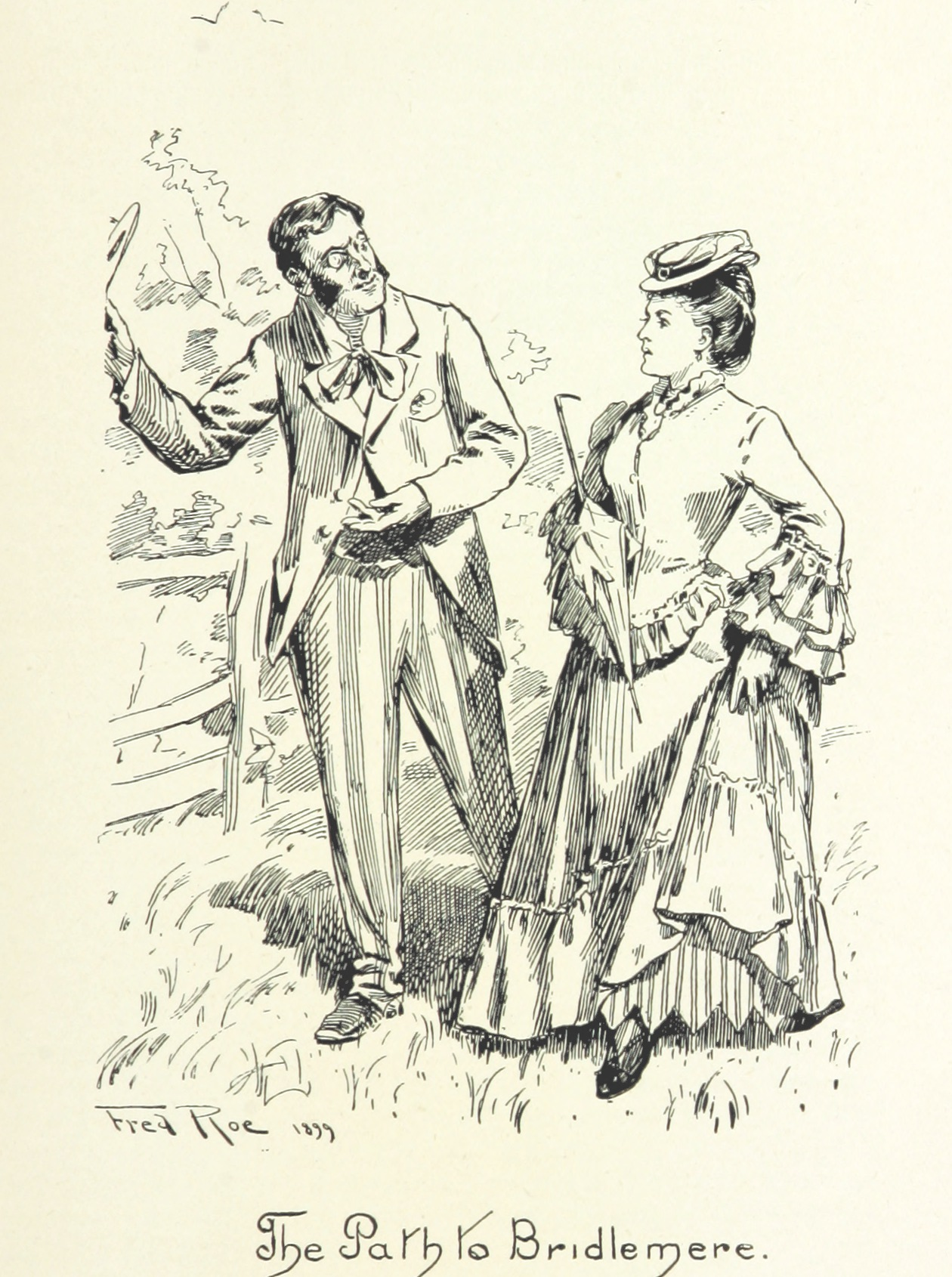
The path to Bridlemere

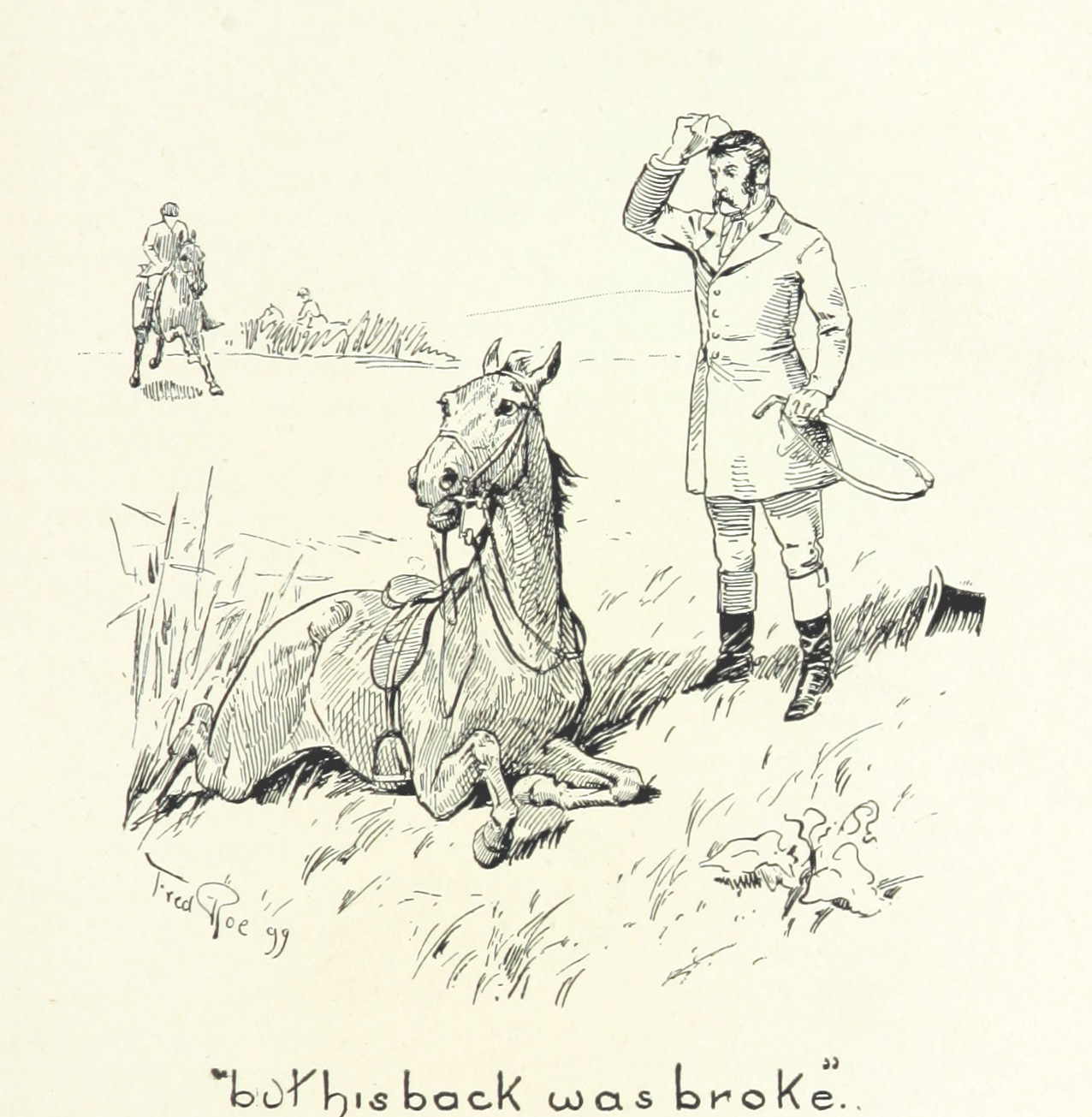
But his back was broke

Frederic 'Fred' Roe (1864 – 16 August 1947) was a genre artist and illustrator, best known for his paintings of landscapes, portraits and military scenes.

== Life and work ==
Alfred Frederic Roe was born in Cambridge, England, the son of Robert Henry Roe, painter and engraver; He went on to study at Heatherley School of Fine Art under Seymour Lucas. Roe first exhibited at the prestigious Royal Academy in 1877, was elected to the RBA in 1895, then to the Royal Institute of British Painters in 1909. He spent many years living in London being recorded in the 1901 census as living in Hampstead with his wife and son, Frederic Gordon Roe (1894–1985), who became an art critic.

Roe developed a successful career as a painter of historical genre subjects, often connected with the Tower of London. He painted several pictures of Joan of Arc, and also some showing incidents in the life of Nelson. He was an accomplished portrait painter and his work can be found in many public collections including the National Portrait Gallery in London. During his career, Roe was best known for his large historical compositions set in period costumes. He is known to have worked in oils and occasionally watercolour.

He later became a leading expert and collector of antique furniture. His book Ancient Coffers and Cupboards (1902) is an "admirable illustrated volume" on English medieval furniture. He was the author of several other reference books: A History of Oak Furniture (1920) and Ancient Church Chests and Chairs (1929). He also illustrated Vanishing England by P. H. Ditchfield and other books.

== Gallery ==
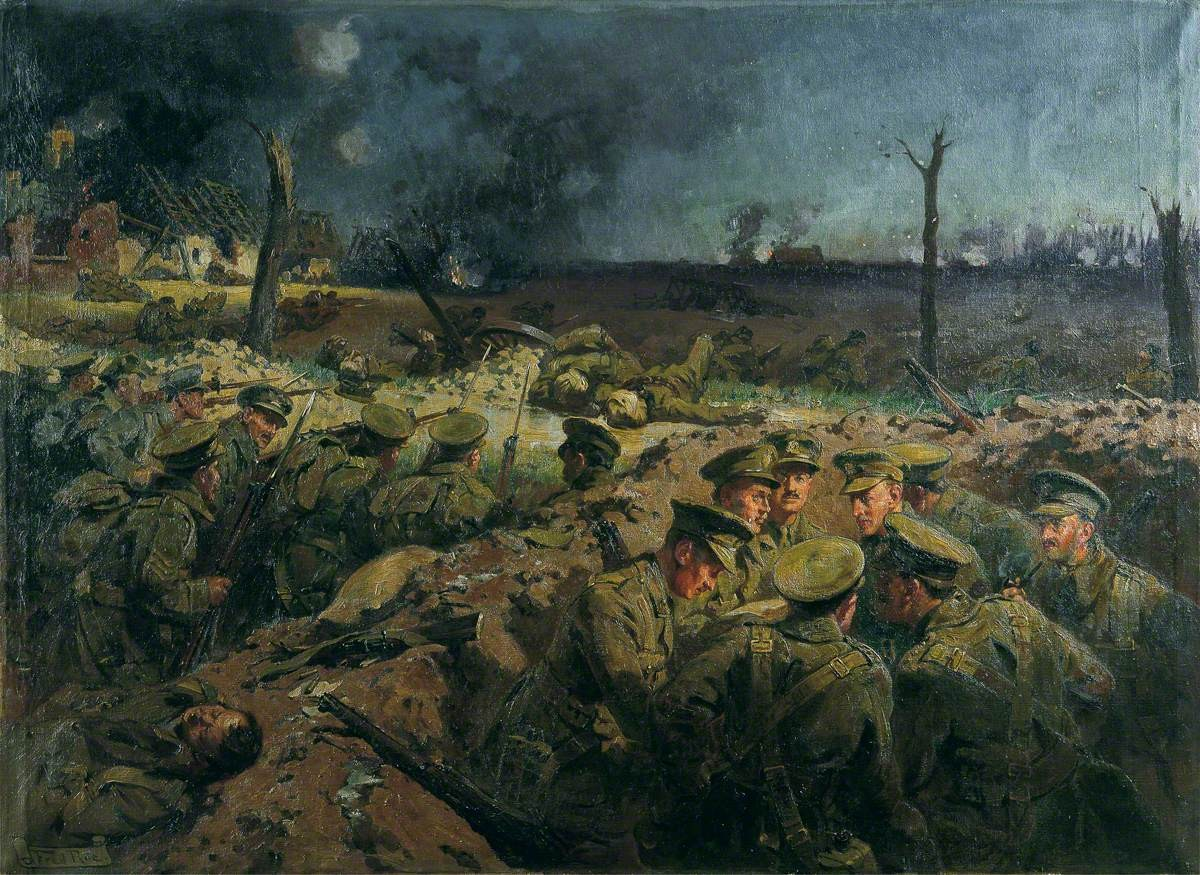
4th Suffolks at Neuve Chapelle, 1918

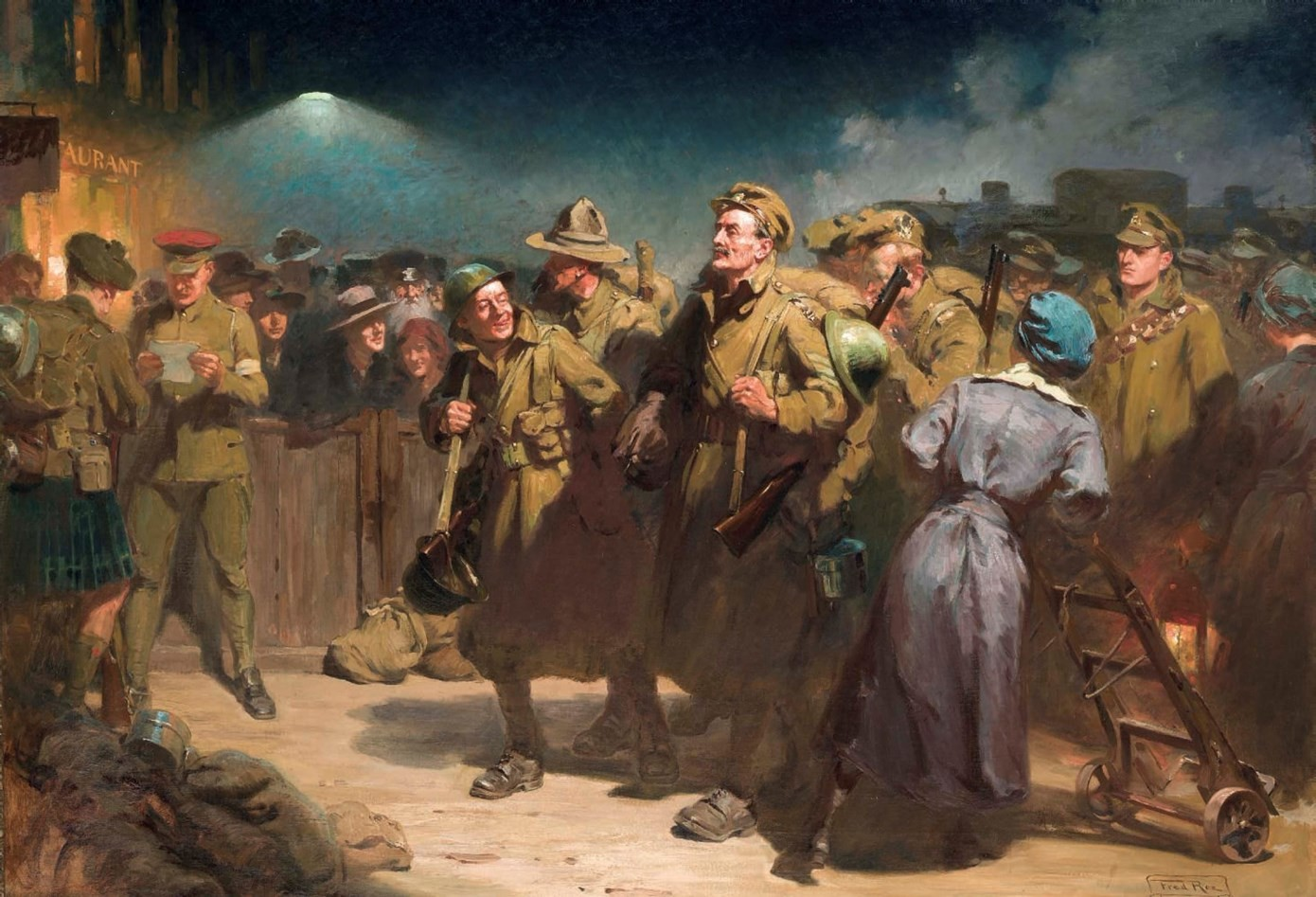
The Return of the Victors, Waterloo Station, 1919

Recruiting in the Guildhall, London, 1920

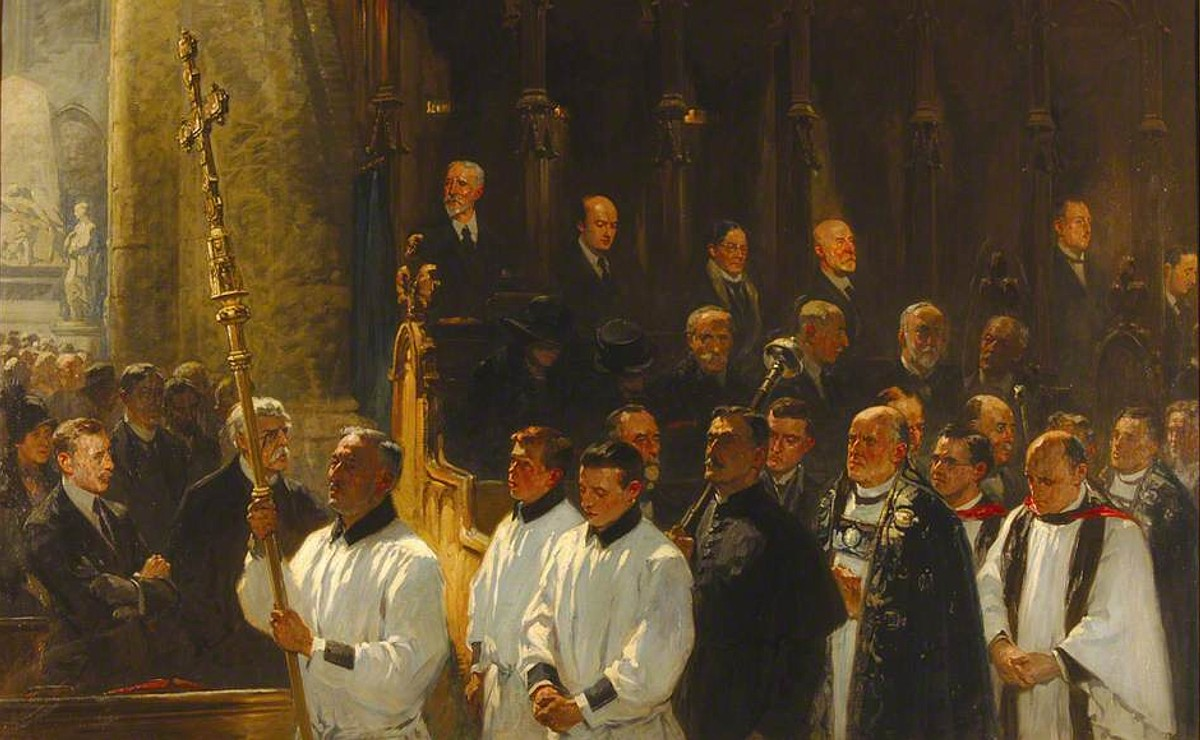
The Passing of John Singer Sargent, 1926
