= Tagg's Island (painting) =

Painting by Alfred Munnings

- Artist: Alfred Munnings
- Year: 1920
- Type: Oil on canvas, genre painting
- Dimensions: 88.9 cm × 127 cm (35.0 in × 50 in)
- Location: Munnings Museum, Dedham

Tagg's Island is a 1920 oil painting by the British artist Alfred Munnings. It shows a picnic taking place on Tagg's Island, an ait in the River Thames not far from Hampton Court to the west of London. It was inspired by a trip Munnings and his friends had gone on in 1919, showing three male artists and four female models with champagne.

It features Munnings' characteristic Impressionist style, while capturing the spirit that would mark the Bright young things at the beginning of the Jazz Age. The picture was displayed at the Royal Academy Exhibition of 1920 held at Burlington House in London. Today it is part of the collection of the Munnings Museum in Dedham having been purchased in 1973. Munnings had produced a smaller version the previous year, which is now in the Potteries Museum and Art Gallery.

== Bibliography ==
- Goodman, Jean. AJ: The Life of Alfred Munnings. Erskine Press, 2019.
- McConkey, Kenneth. The New English: A History of the New English Art Club. Harry N. Abrams, 2006.
