= Machinery (Demuth) =

Drawing by Charles Demuth

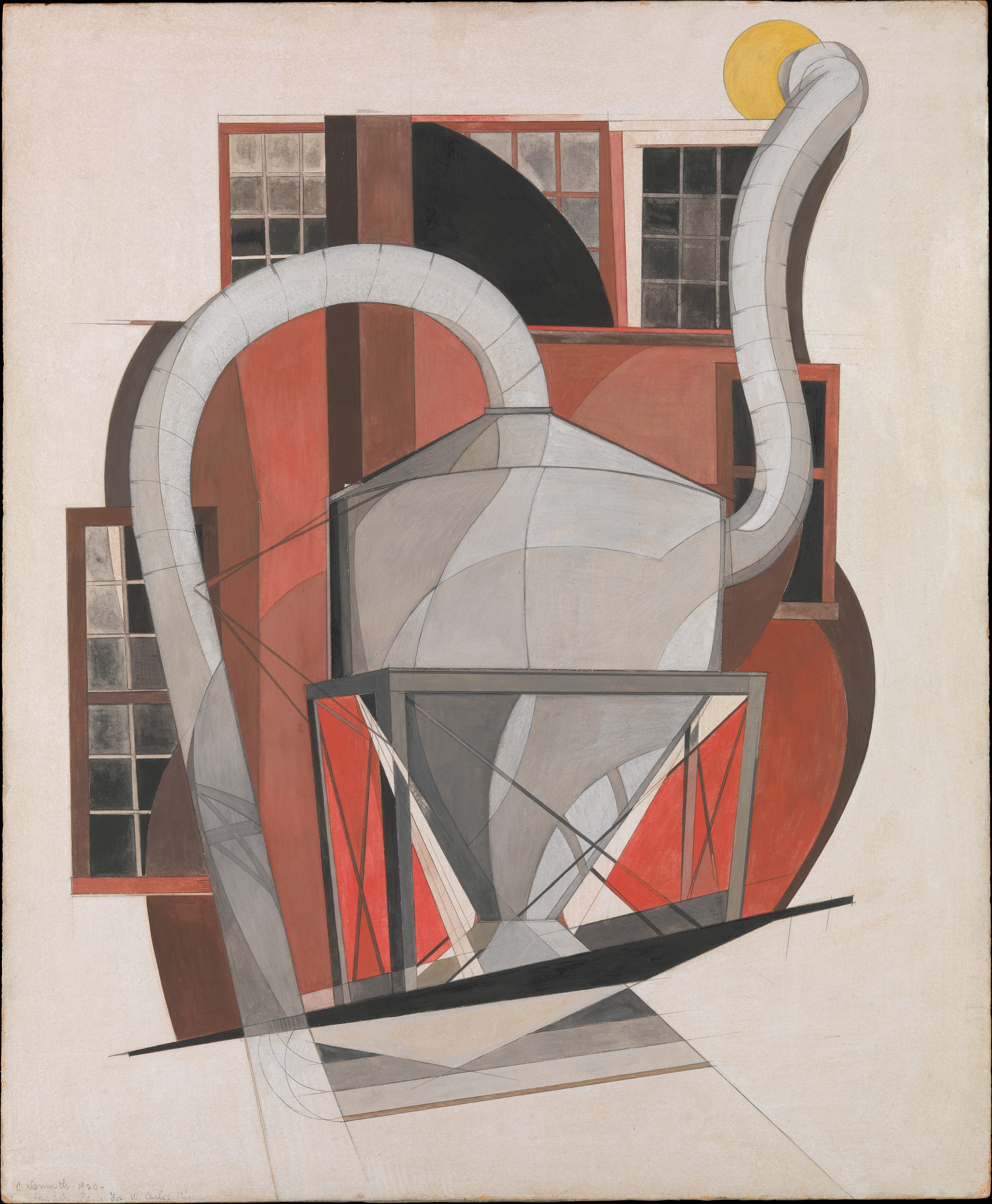
- Artist: Charles Demuth
- Year: 1920
- Medium: Graphite and gouache on paper
- Dimensions: 61 cm × 50.5 cm (24 in × 19.9 in)
- Location: Metropolitan Museum of Art; New York

Machinery is a 1920 drawing by American artist Charles Demuth. The drawing depicts a piece of industrial machinery in his hometown of Lancaster, Pennsylvania. The work is currently in the collection of the Metropolitan Museum of Art.

== Description ==
A principal member of the Precisionist art movement, Charles Demuth's work was often concerned with structures, machines, and logos. This interest is reflected in his 1920 work Machinery, which depicts a piece of industrial equipment in his hometown of Lancaster, Pennsylvania. Demuth dedicated the drawing to his friend, American poet William Carlos Williams.

The drawing itself depicts a cyclone separator set in front of a factory wall. The detail of Machinery exemplifies many aspects of Precisionism; the background and the machine's body are made of hard-edged lines, while the machine's tubing is more fluid, seemingly flexible. Demuth uses the shadows cast by the centrifuge to add depth to the painting and to emphasize the roundness of the machine. In addition, the various shades of gray seen on the metal contrast the red and brown of the background, while also complementing the gray, white, and black of the wall's windowpanes. A singular spot of yellow is used to draw the viewer to the progression of the machine's feeding tubes, which serve a dual purpose; the light metallic tubes tie the drawing together, while at the same time segregating the darker windows from the lighter red of the brick.
