= Samuel John Hodson =

British artist (1835–1908)

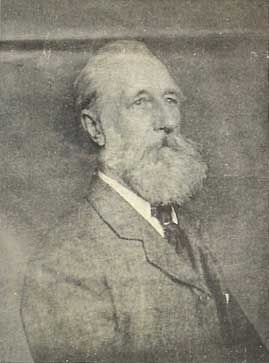
Samuel J Hodson

Samuel John Hodson (14 October 1835 – 5 July 1908) was a British watercolour artist who mainly produced landscape paintings of European towns and buildings with figures. He was a member of the Royal Watercolour Society.

== Life and works ==
In 1850 (aged 15) Hodson became an apprentice to Edmund Hardy, card-maker for a period of 7 years within the Goldsmiths’ Company and on completion became a member of the Goldsmiths and a Freeman of the City of London. While still an apprentice in 1851 he was articled, as a printer, to Charles Blair Leighton, artist and father of the oil painter Edmund Blair Leighton. This was where he learned the process of lithography. He also learned about aquatinting and drawing on wood under Josiah Wood Whymper (wood-engraver, illustrator and watercolourist). Hodson found he preferred the creativity of water colours to that of printing and from 1858 worked as a professional artist after studying at Leigh’s Academy, The School of Design, Somerset House and later at the Royal Academy.

Very early in his career as an artist, in 1859, Hodson was commissioned to paint Queen Victoria opening Parliament. In 1860 he exhibited work at the Royal Academy. and the Royal Society of British Artists. He became an associate member of the Royal Watercolour Society (RWS) in 1882 and a full member in 1890. Intermittently. he was a member of the RWS's council and in 1896/97 was its temporary secretary. He was also a member of Royal Society of British Artists from 1890.

Hodson taught drawing and watercolour painting for 12 years at the Crystal Palace School of Art (no longer in existence). He travelled extensively throughout Europe painting landscapes and townscapes. His paintings were often of bustling market squares and busy streets. His style was delicate and impressionistic. Examples of his work can be found at the British Museum, the V&A, Haworth Art Gallery in Accrington and in the Knohl Collection. He has two paintings in the Royal Collection archives – market scenes of Bonn and Abbeville. His paintings have sold through Christie’s, Sotheby’s, Bonhams and other auction houses.

In 1871 Hodson invented a sophisticated form of chromolithography (but did not patent it). The idea for a new colour-printing process came about following a conversation with his friend Edward Whymper (son of Josiah Whymper). Edward Whymper is known as a mountaineer and the first person to climb the Matterhorn; he was also a writer and illustrator. With his background in printing, Hodson devised an aquatint method. This chromographic process of colour printing (that used four or five plates for each colour rather than the standard three) was used by The Graphic magazine where he worked from 1874 to 1898.

While working at The Graphic he met fellow artists Hubert von Herkomer, John Ruskin and William Callow and their influence may be seen in Hodson’s work. He became good friends with William Callow. Callow was 23 years older than Hodson but they died within months of each other. Shortly after their deaths, Hodson’s wife moved into the house at Great Missenden with William Callow’s widow for a while.

When London Underground celebrated its 150th anniversary in 2013, London Transport used two of his chromolithographs of Baker Street Underground in their publicity and one of them was used on a special edition set of postage stamps.

== Personal ==
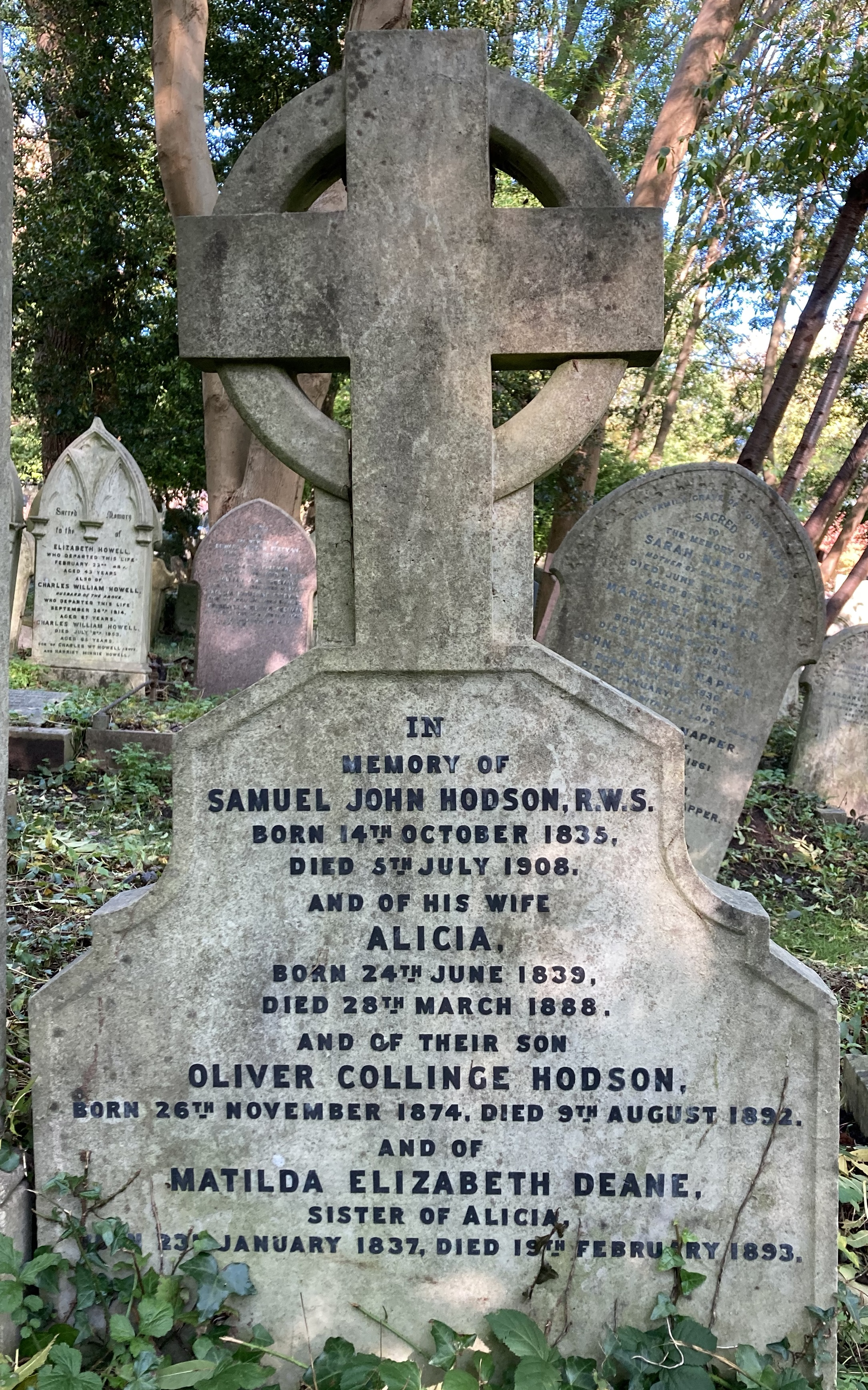
Family grave of Samuel John Hodson in Highgate Cemetery

Samuel Hodson was the ninth child of James Shirley Hodson (printer) and Mary Ann Hodson (nee Wilson). James Shirley Hodson was the first secretary to the Printers’ Pension Corporation, a charitable organisation founded in 1827 that supported alms-houses and orphanages.

Samuel lived in London throughout his life – he was born and spent his childhood in Hatton Garden and as an adult lived at various addresses in central London. He lived in Islington at the time of his death.

Samuel married Alicia Deane (born in Ireland in 1839) on 16 August 1871 and had three children. Only one child survived to adulthood and married but did not have any surviving children. After Alicia died on 28 March 1888 he married Edith Mosley on 27 July 1893. Edith (born 6 Feb 1849) was an excellent amateur artist herself and accompanied Samuel on his trips abroad.

They had one child, Eric Mosley Hodson, on 3 October 1894. Samuel was almost 59 and Edith 45 when Eric was born. Eric was 13 when Samuel died. Edith was a widow for 41 years. Aged 80 she moved to Farnborough, Kent to live with Eric, his wife Helen (Whyte) and family. She died in 1949, shortly before her 101st birthday.

Samuel was buried on the eastern side of Highgate Cemetery with his first wife, son and sister-in-law.

== Gallery ==
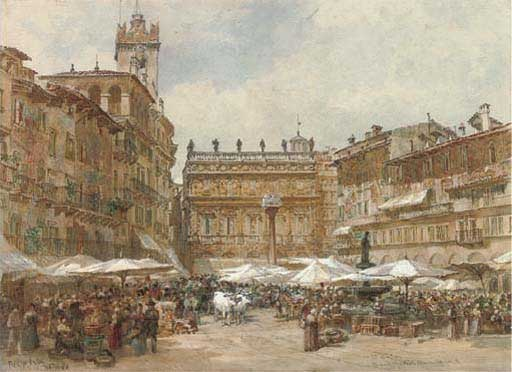
Painting of Verona by Samuel John Hodson

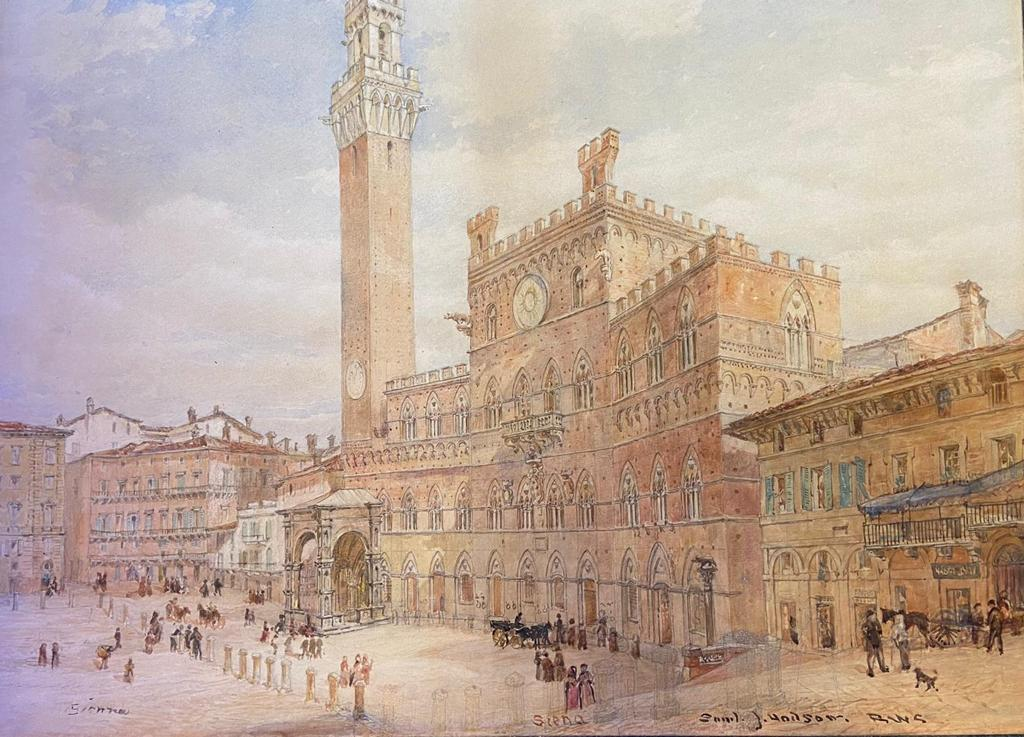
Painting of Siena by Samuel John Hodson c 1888

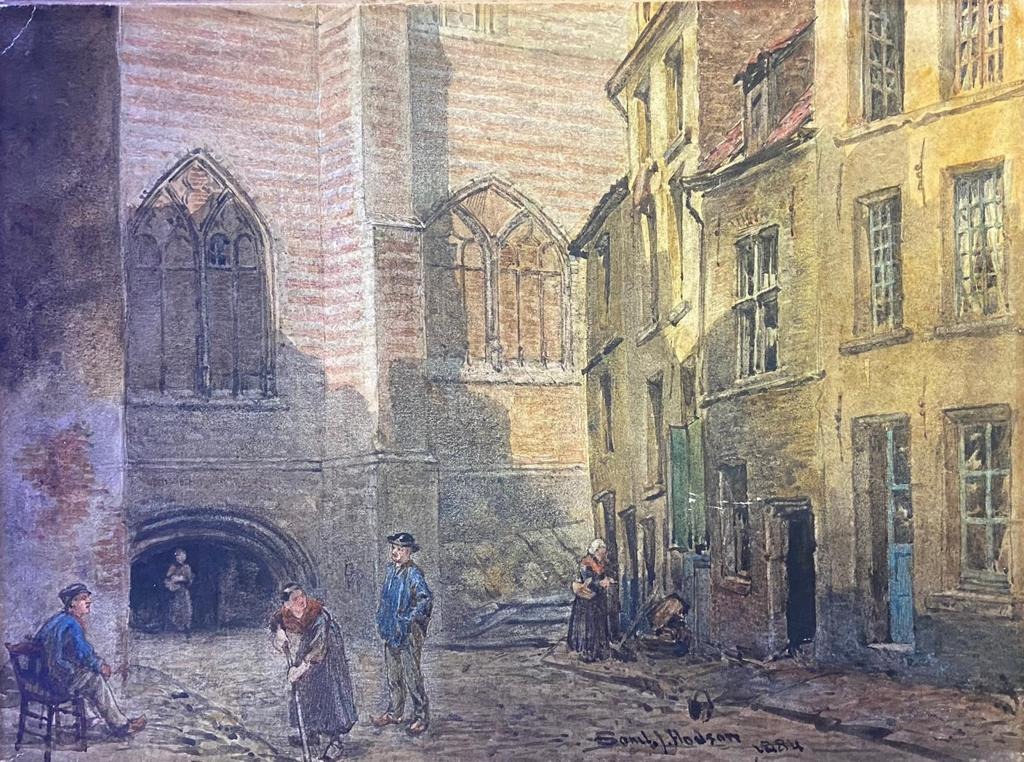
La Boucherie, Old Antwerp signed and dated 1884 and exhibited at the RWS in 1885

== Bibliography ==
- The Magazine of Art. Feb 1893. "Lucerne" illustration and mention of it in the article
- History of the Old Water-Colour Society. J L Roget 1891. List of members in 1891. p430
- Noble's Colour Printing 1881. Chromographic Process
- Colour Printing 1910. Article on Hodson’s Chromographic Process. R M Burch

== Dictionary listings ==
- A Dictionary of Artists from 1760-1893. Algernon Graves
- Dictionary of British Artists Working 1900-1950. Grant M Waters
- The Dictionary of British Artists 1880-1940. J Johnson and A Greutzner
- British Watercolour Artists up to 1920. H Mallalieu
- Dictionary of Victorian Painters. Christopher Wood
