= The End of the Song =

1902 oil painting by Edmund Blair Leighton

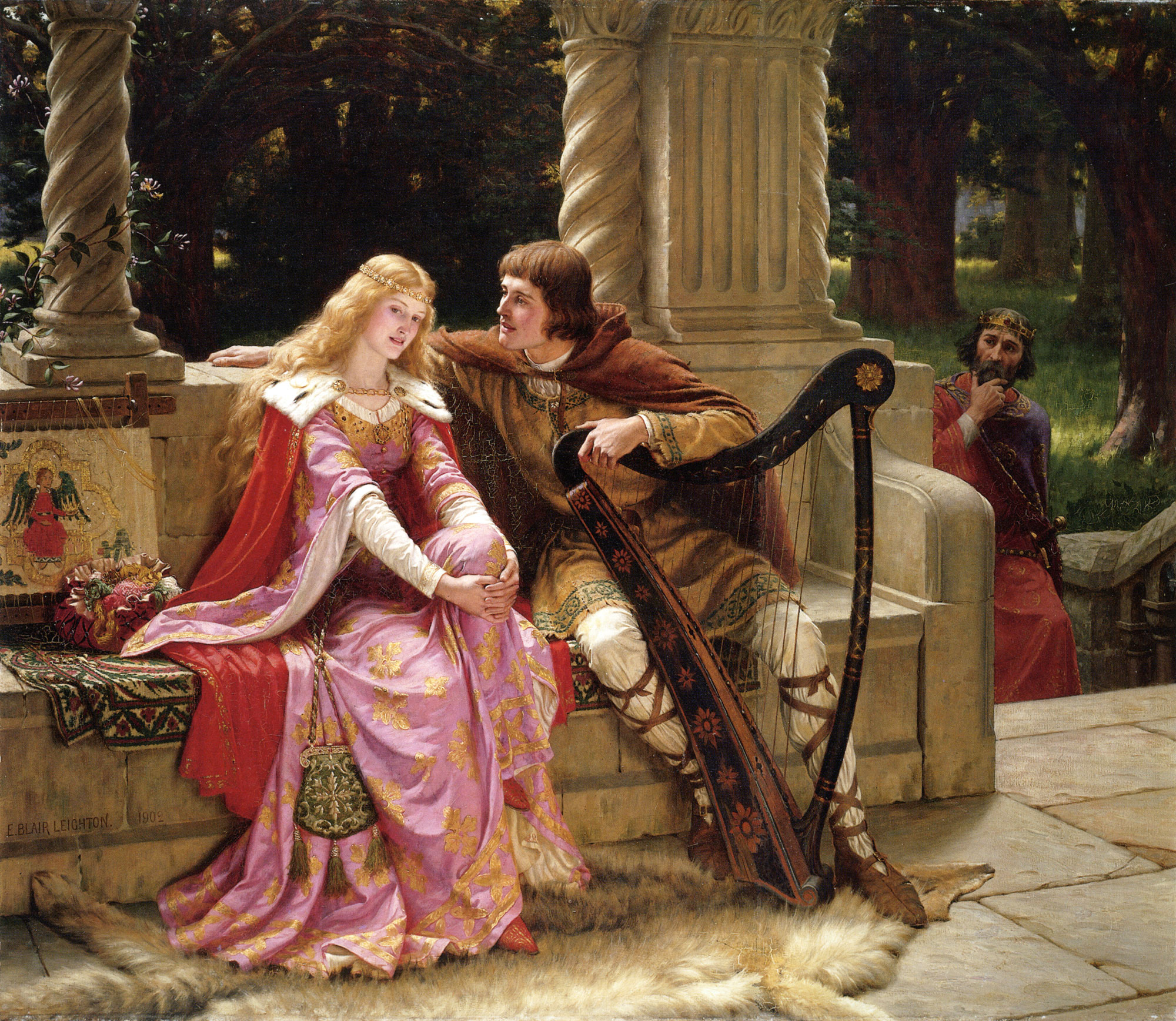
- Artist: Edmund Leighton
- Year: 1902
- Medium: Oil on canvas
- Movement: Pre-Raphaelite
- Dimensions: 128.4 cm × 147.3 cm (50.6 in × 58.0 in)
- Owner: Private collection

The End of the Song is an oil on canvas painting by the English artist Edmund Blair Leighton, from 1902. It is held in a private collection.

== Description ==
The painting depicts a young pair sitting on the veranda of a palace. A harpist who has just finished playing a song and now flirts with a fair princess. Her embroidery is set aside as she engages shyly. In Academy Notes (1902), their outfits are described: "The princess wears a lilac gold-embroidered robe with scarlet and ermine mantle; the minstrel has a yellow tunic and red-brown cloak." Honeysuckle, symbolising 'love, happiness, and new opportunities' along with 'generous and devoted affection', ascends the column on the right of the princess.

A crowned figure, evidently the king and the princess' father, walks up the steps from the forest, witnessing the scene. He strokes his beard in contemplation of the young couple who are unaware of his approach.

The young musician's harp was likely modeled after one in Leighton's possession. In Leighton's Who's Who entry, it's said he was a 'collector of old musical instruments.' They appear in many of his pictures; other examples are My Heart and Lute (1885), Fame (1889), and How Lisa loved the King (1890).

== Theme and context ==
While The End of the Song does not intend to depict a specific tale, it recalls two well-known couples: Tristan and Iseult and Paolo and Francesca.

=== Tristan and Iseult ===
Tristan and Iseult is a medieval tale set in the day of King Arthur. The Irish princess Iseult was the wife of King Mark of Cornwall, the Cornish knight Tristran's uncle. The love between Tristan and Iseult occurs during Tristan's mission to escort Iseult on a sea voyage back to Cornwall to marry his uncle King Mark when they both mistakingly drink a love potion, beginning their love affair.

Leighton depicted the couple Tristan and Iseult in a painting exhibited at the Royal Academy in 1907 (that is now apparently lost), furthering the thematic connection. The interpretation of this painting as presenting a moment from the tale of Tristan and Iseult is so popular that it is used as an alternate title. The revised final version can be interpreted in favour of the story of Tristan and Iseult. Several elements of the legend appear in the painting. There is an episode in which King Mark attacks Tristan while he is playing the harp for Iseult. But it is also told that King Mark and Tristan do love and revere each other, and that because the love between Tristan and Iseult was induced by a love potion it absolves them of some responsibility and complicates King Mark's response. So both the violent episode and the ambiguous context are true to the story. The use of honeysuckle also feeds into this interpretation, '...Love sometimes unites a timid girl to a proud warrior.'

=== Paolo and Francesca ===
Francesca da Rimini was married to Giovanni Malatesta, but she fell in love with her brother-in-law, the also-married Paolo Malatesta, while reading a romance about the Arthurian hero, Sir Lancelot. Their affair continued for some ten years until they were discovered by Giovanni and both murdered by him. Their tale became a popular story in the 19th century due to Dante referring to it in his Divine Comedy. This popularity inspired many works which may have also influenced Leighton's paintings.

== Overpainting ==
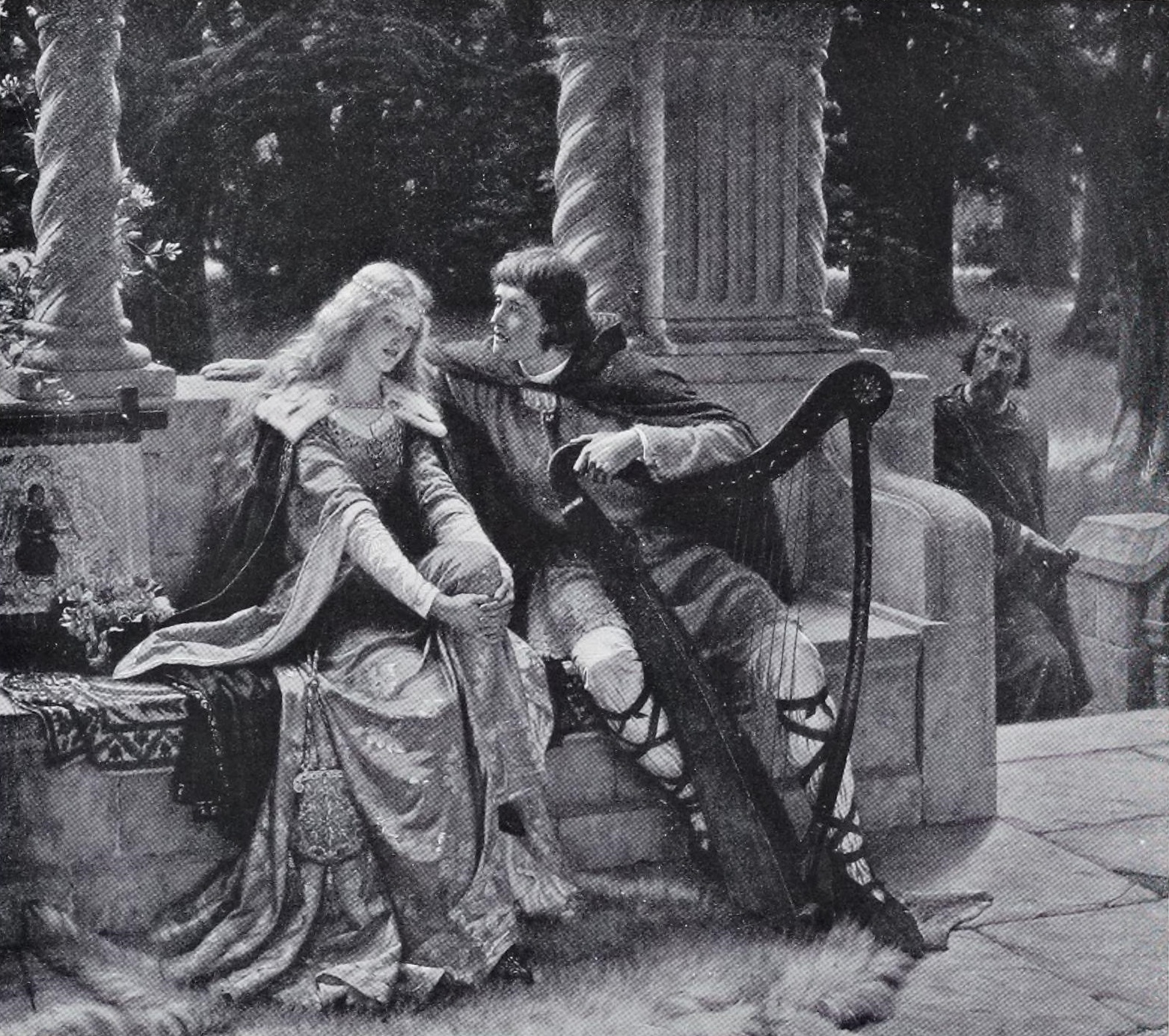
The End of the Song by Edmund Blair Leighton, first version

The final version of the painting has a different mood than the original, for there was an earlier version which was overpainted, depicting the king reaching for his sword to threaten violence or even kill the young man, a musician who the king would not wish to see his daughter flirting with. Christie's Lot Essay considers the painting to be "as much about class distinction and the social status of the artist as it was about amorous dalliance and the capacity of music to be [...] 'the food of love'."

Christie's presumes that this change may have been because an earlier owner of the painting must have found the first version too disturbing and asked Leighton alter it, a not-uncommon event at the time. Evidence shows that the most likely course of events and the timeline would be that a patron had requested the changes when he bought the picture in 1902. The true reason for changing the scene in this way is ultimately up for interpretation.

While attending the painting class at Heatherley School of Fine Art, Mr. Heatherley himself told Leighton, "In art it is never too late to alter your work if it is wrong." This advice is clearly something he took to heart.

== Provenance ==
The End of the Song was exhibited, like many of Leighton's paintings, in the Royal Academy of Arts in London upon its completion in 1902. The first known owner was R. Schumacher when he bought the painting in 1913. From then, it presumedly stayed in his ownership until it was acquired by the auction house Christie's. The painting was estimated by Christie's at GBP 250,000–350,000, but was ultimately sold for GBP 240,250 at an auction that closed 14 June 2000, joining a private collection.

== Related works ==
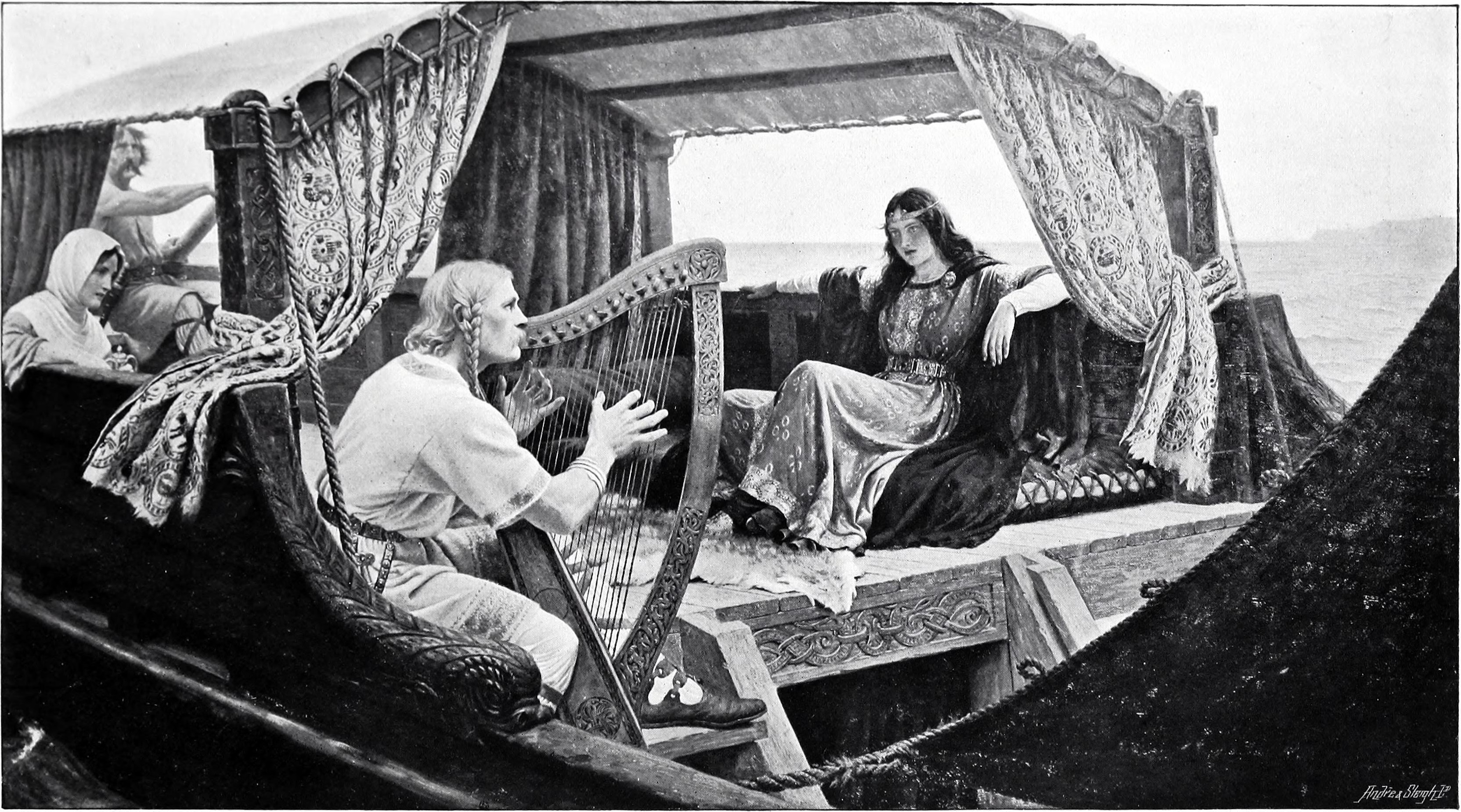
Photo of the lost painting Tristram and Isolde by Edmund Blair Leighton, as exhibited at the Royal Academy in 1907

Another version of this painting exists titled The song is ended, was sold by Sotheby's in Billingshurst on 30 January 1996 for GBP 1,700. It is an oil-on-panel painting and only 15 x 20 cm. (5.9 x 7.9 in.).

Another oil-on-panel painting by Leighton titled Tristram and Isolde, was sold from Christie's in London on 13 December 2017 with a pre-sale estimated value of GBP 20,000–30,000. The dimensions are 15.2 x 27.3 cm.

The Hostage (1912) by Leighton also possibly depicts a moment from the tale of Tristan and Isolde.

== See also ==
- Royal Academy Exhibition of 1902
- List of Pre-Raphaelite paintings
- The Meeting on the Turret Stairs, 1864 romantic medieval painting
