= The Accolade (painting) =

1901 painting by Edmund Leighton

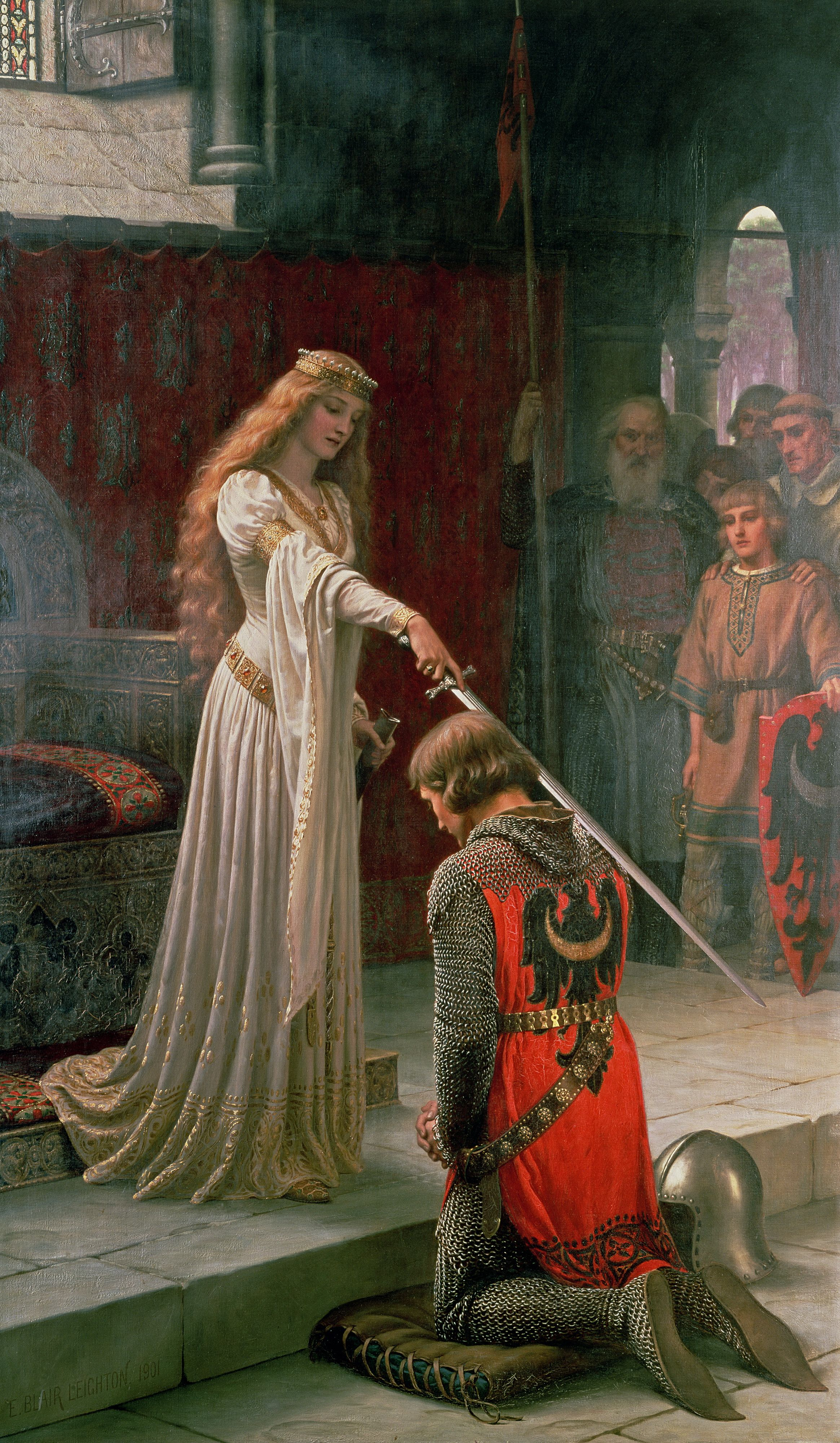
- Artist: Edmund Leighton
- Year: 1901
- Medium: Oil on canvas
- Movement: Pre-Raphaelite
- Dimensions: 182.3 cm × 108 cm (71.8 in × 43 in)
- Owner: Private collection

The Accolade was painted in 1901 by Edmund Leighton.

Accolade refers to "a touch on a person's shoulders with a sword at the bestowing of a knighthood" — it is part of a ceremony to confer knighthood. The man being knighted is likely meant to be the Polish Duke Henry VI the Good, as shown by the coat of arms on his back and on the shield being held by a young boy in the background.

The Accolade is one of many paintings by Leighton on the subject of chivalry, with others including God Speed and The Dedication. It is among Leighton’s most recognisable paintings and one he himself liked.

Inspirations for the work came from the romanticised medieval revival during the Victorian era and French work on chivalry 'which mentioned that even ladies occasionally conferred the order of knighthood on worthy men'.

== Description and Interpretation ==
The ceremony is performed by a young queen who is the protagonist of the painting, highlighted by the pure white and gold of her dress, and the moral symbolism of her long, loose, blonde hair. She is representating a feminine ideal that corresponds to the courtly midons originating from the Arthurian narrative then filtered through the post-Romantic author Alfred Tennyson and his reinterpretation of Le Morte d'Arthur.

The knight, her vassal — their dynamic further evoked by her standing above him on a platform, and symbolically elevated by her white attire — is bowed before her in a show of fealty, his head respectfully uncovered. The knight's clasped hands evoke prayer, Christianising the scene. The relationship between the queen and knight is likely sensual, for the vassal homage could be used to subtly implicate sensual attitudes and situations, stemming from the couple's physical closeness and their single point of contact.

An audience is gathered on the queen’s left, serving as witnesses to the ceremony as was social custom.

The painting does not depict a king. Due to this dynamic, this painting is sometimes used to refer to the knighting of Lancelot by Queen Guinevere despite the attributed arms not resembling that of Lancelot's.

Everything in this painting is seeped in intentional symbolism, from the queen's sapphire ring, the window which allows light to halo her form, to the use of the colour red, etcetera. Leighton balances the spiritual beauty of the inherently Christian ceremony, and entertainment-oriented beauty which overrides historical accuracy in clothing and scenery.
