= My Lady Passeth By =

1914 painting by Edmund Blair Leighton

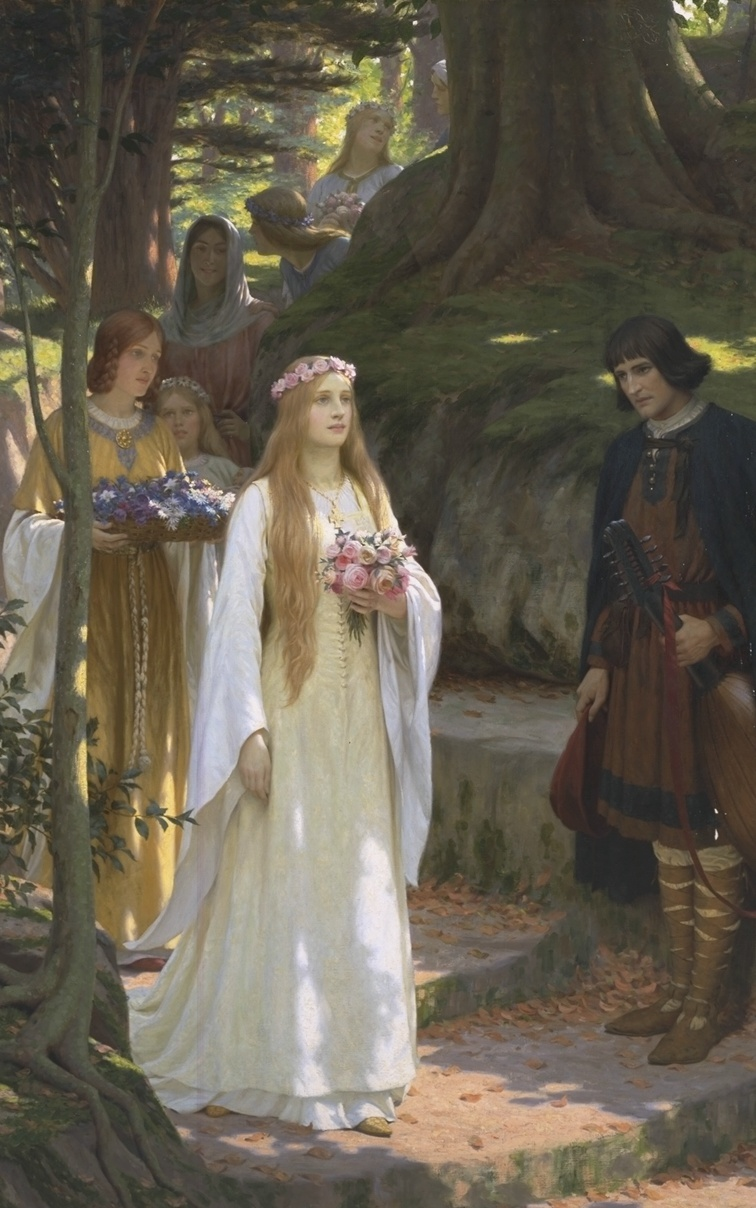
- Artist: Edmund Blair Leighton
- Year: 1914
- Medium: Oil on canvas
- Movement: Pre-Raphaelite
- Dimensions: 170.2 cm × 110.5 cm (67.0 in × 43.5 in)
- Owner: Private collection

My Lady Passeth By, also commonly known as My Fair Lady, was painted by Edmund Blair Leighton in 1914.

The painting depicts a serene medieval scene set in a wooded area. The central figure is a woman with blonde hair, wearing a white gown and floral headdress, and carrying a bouquet of pink roses. She has a procession of attendants, young ladies of various ages carrying flowers and looking curious or happy. A man, possibly a troubadour based on his instrument, stands aside in the shade with his head bare in respect, gazing directly at the passing lady. It is a romantic and idyllic scene typical of Leighton.

The Western Daily Press describes My Lady Passeth By as part of Leighton's 'long sequence of picturesque, historical compositions' and dates the setting to the 14th century.

== Provenance ==
By September 1973, the painting was with Reading Fine Art Gallery, Ltd. It was acquired in an anonymous sale from Phillips, London, on 13 December 1976 under the name My Lady Fair. On 2 November 1995, it was sold anonymously by Christie's in New York by the name My Fair Lady to Simon Bonython.

The painting was then acquired directly from Bonython on 28 October 2019 by the present owner via Christie's, where it had been estimated at US$100,000–150,000, with a realised price of US$187,500. It is now "Property of an Important Collector".
