= In Time of Peril =

1897 painting by Edmund Leighton

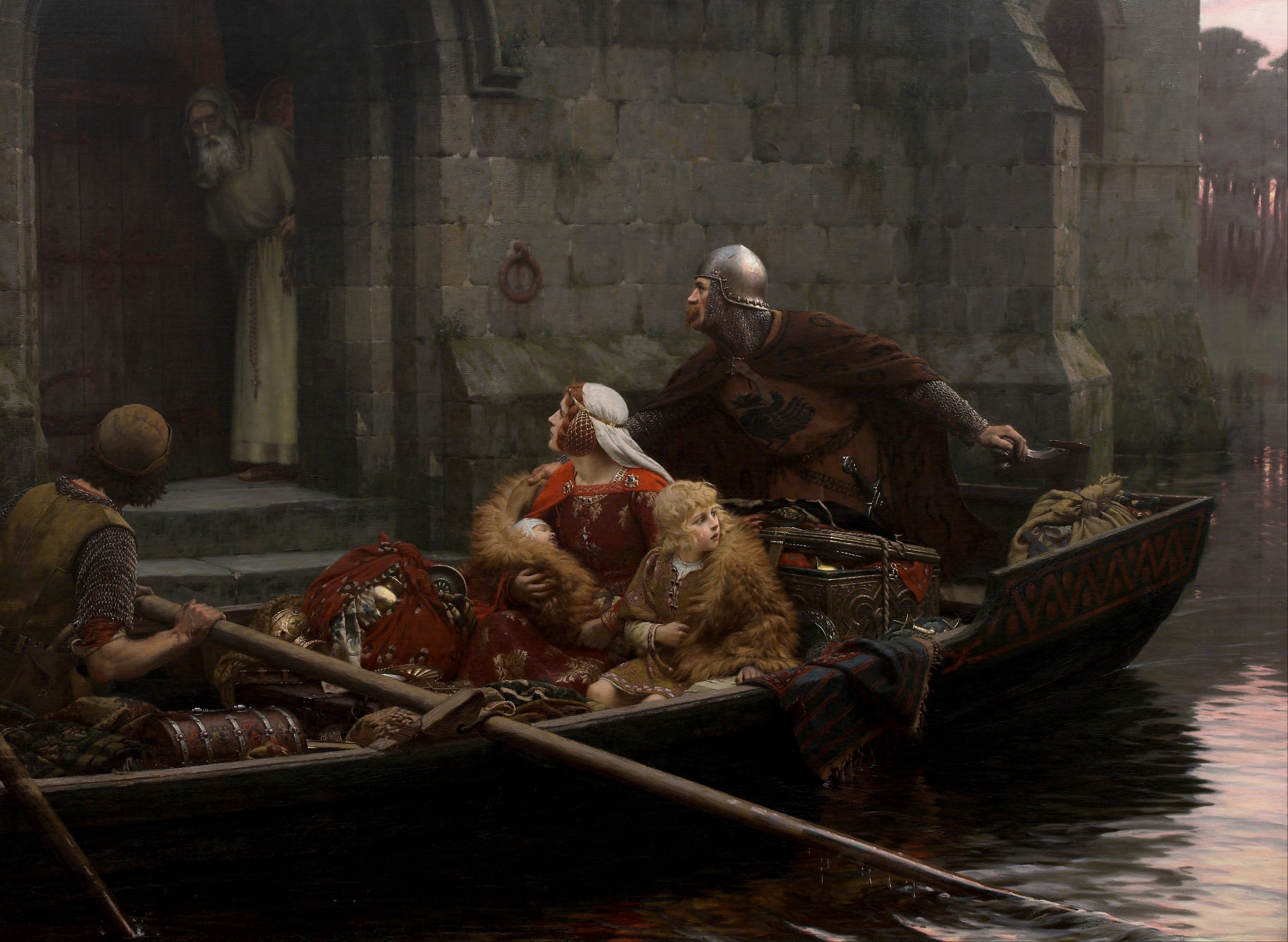
- Artist: Edmund Leighton
- Year: 1897
- Medium: Oil on canvas
- Movement: Pre-Raphaelite
- Dimensions: 124.5 cm × 168.9 cm (49.0 in × 66.5 in)
- Location: Auckland Art Gallery, Auckland

In Time of Peril is an oil on canvas painting by English artist Edmund Leighton, from 1897.

== History and description ==
The painting depicts two young princes who have been spirited away from danger: a young boy who looks back with fear and an infant in his mother's arms. They are huddled under furs with their luxuriously-dressed mother. The royal refugees arrive at a monastery seeking sanctuary, escorted by two men in chainmail (at least one of them a knight, indicated by his coat of arms) and travelling with an assortment of treasure. Leighton himself had once described the scene in a letter: "laid at the water gate of a monastery in the fourteenth century; the outcome of reading of the shelter afforded by such places to the women, children and treasure, of those who were hard driven, and in danger."

According to the Auckland Art Gallery, "it was a canny choice of subject, for dynastic anxieties inevitably lurk in the wake of aging monarchs." This is referring to Queen Victoria and her Diamond Jubilee, the 60th anniversary of her reign, for which Leighton as an Englishman would have been surrounded by celebrations.

== Provenance ==
In Time of Peril debuted at the Royal Academy exhibition of 1897. This painting was acquired by the Mackelvie Trust Collection for the Auckland Art Gallery, New Zealand, before 2001. It is not on display as of March 2026.

The oil-on-panel study for In Time of Peril was given to the Leighton's daughter, Sophie Helen Blair Harding, and from that time passed down by descent until its next known provenance: sold at auction from Christie's in London on 12 March 2014.
