= Charles Blair Leighton =

English painter

Charles Leighton
- Born: Charles Leighton; 6 March 1823
- Died: 6 February 1855 (aged 31)
- Known for: Painting

Charles Blair Leighton (6 March 1823 – 6 February 1855) was an English painter. He was the father of painter Edmund Blair Leighton (1853–1922).

== Biography ==
Charles Leighton was born to Stephen Leighton and Helen Blair. He was apprenticed to a silver-engraver between ages 14–21 but abandoned engraving and became a student of the Royal Academy. He painted portraits and figure-pieces, and was an occasional exhibitor at the Royal Academy.

He married Caroline Boosey, daughter of music publisher Thomas Boosey, in April 1849 and they had two daughters and a son, the painter Edmund Blair Leighton.

He died on 6 February 1855, aged 31.
