= The Hostage (painting) =

1912 painting by Edmund Leighton

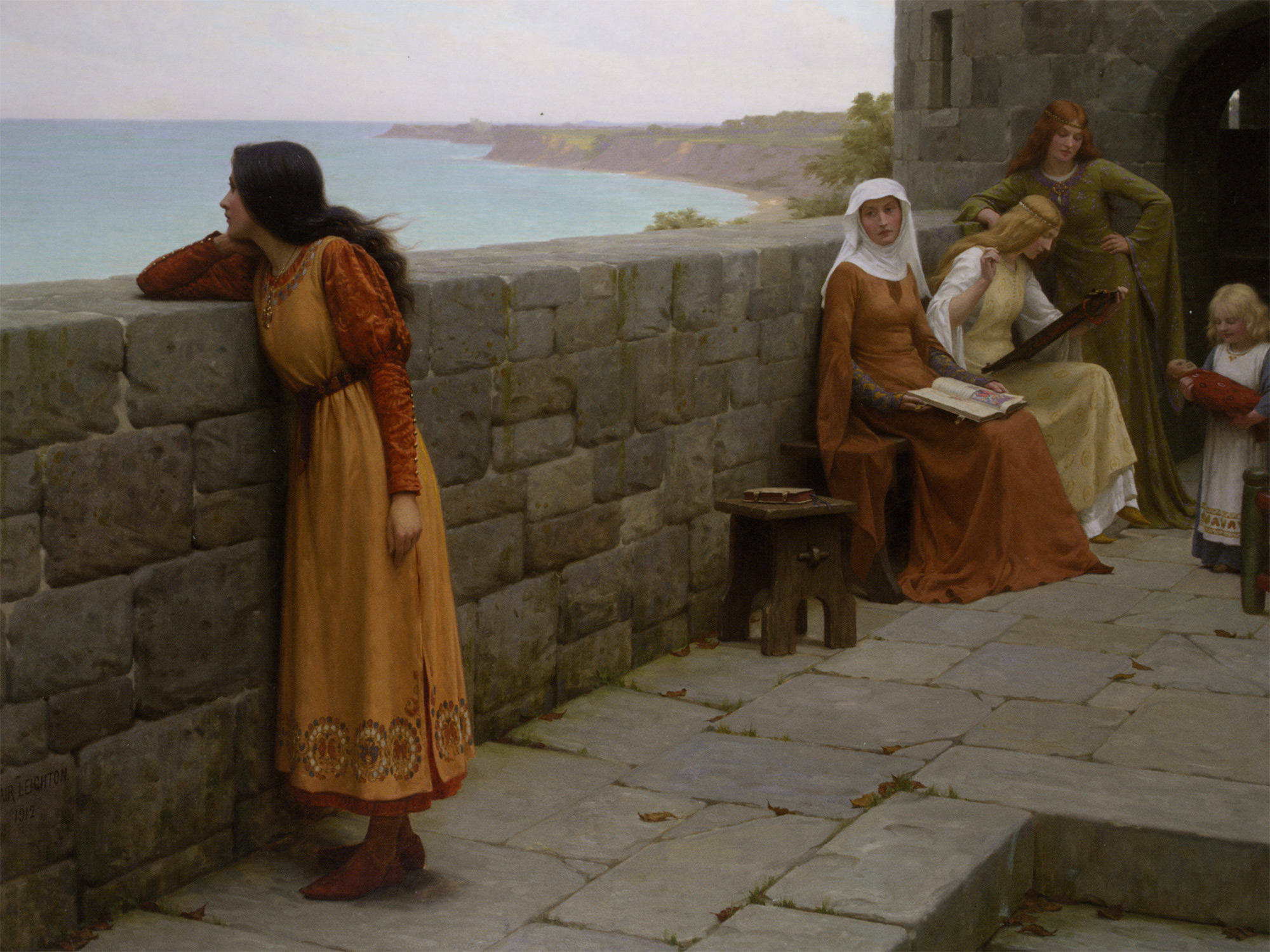
- Artist: Edmund Leighton
- Year: 1912
- Medium: Oil on canvas
- Movement: Pre-Raphaelite
- Dimensions: 111.75 cm × 149.75 cm (44.00 in × 58.96 in)
- Owner: Private collection

The Hostage is an oil on canvas painting by English artist Edmund Blair Leighton, from 1912. It was exhibited in Royal Academy in 1912.

== History and description ==
The Hostage is an example of Leighton's usual subject matter of medieval women. It depicts a young woman leaning on the battlements of a castle, staring longingly at the horizon across the sea, the only subject visibly impacted by the sea breeze. It is unclear if the title of the painting refers to the subject's literally being a hostage of whoever rules this castle by the shore, or her emotional/mental state. She is emotionally and physically removed from the scene near her, where three other women and a child communally engage in different activities. One of the women is veiled, indicating that she is married, and looks up from what she is reading to regard the lone woman.

The subject of the painting may be linked to the story of Tristan and Iseult. There are two women named Iseult in the romance: Iseult the Blonde, an Irish princess; and Iseult of the White Hands of Brittany. Leighton's figure is unlikely to be Iseult of the White Hands, Tristan's jealous wife who told him that his lover Iseult the Blonde was dead, resulting in his own death. More likely is that the painting depicts Iseult the Blonde in her father's castle in Ireland, awaiting Tristan to take her to Cornwall to marry his own uncle, King Mark.

There is an oil-on-panel sketch of The Hostage which is almost identical to the final painting, differing only in minor details. It was sold by Sotheby's in New York on 7 June 1995.

== Provenance ==
The Hostage was bought from Leighton himself by Mr R. Laidlaw by 1913, after which it ended up in Antwerp with Guillaume Campo. The last known location of the painting is in British Galleries of London, before it was auctioned by Sotheby's on 27 November 2003 for £173,600 to join a private collection.
