= Faded Laurels =

1889 painting by Edmund Leighton

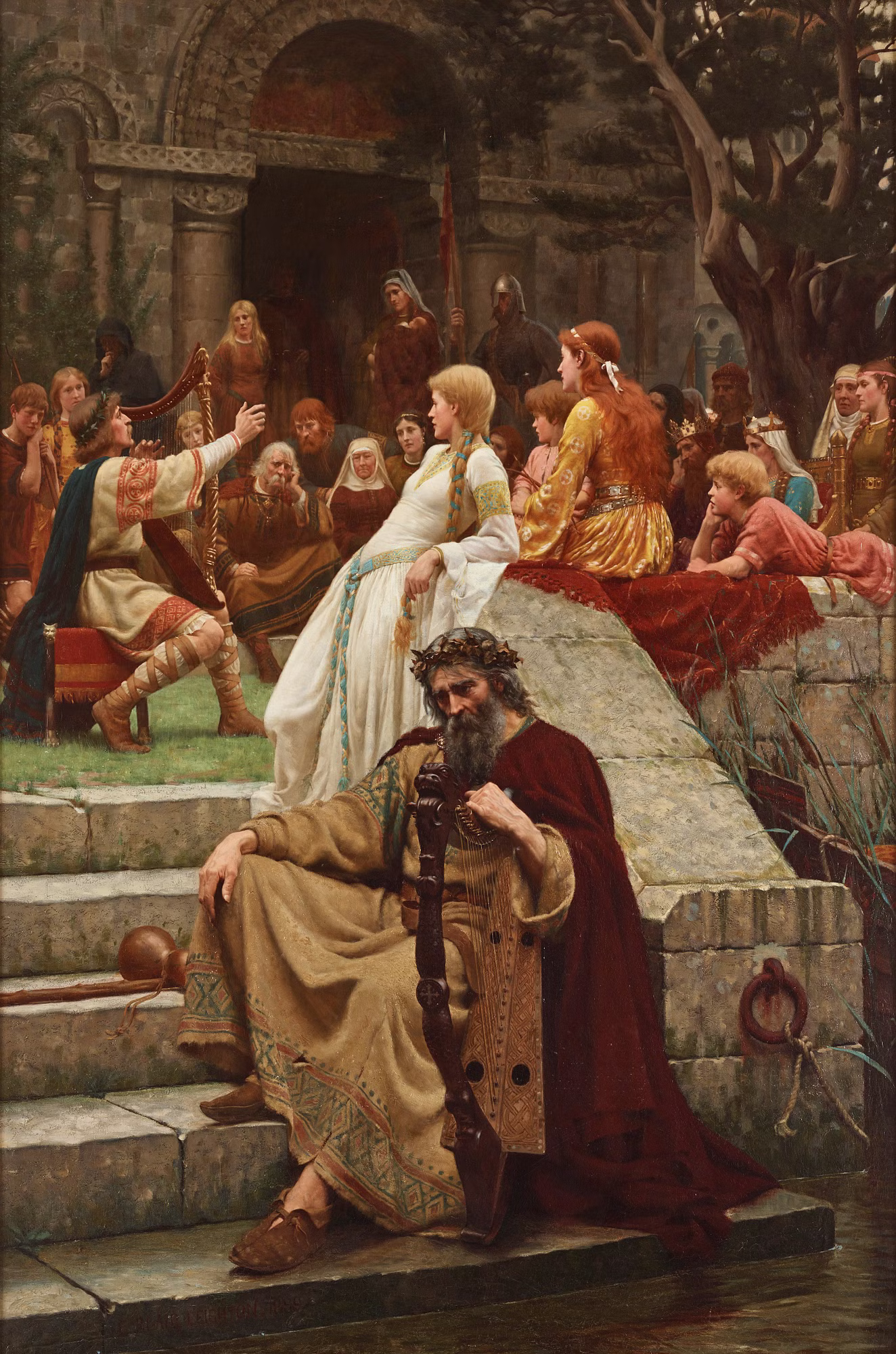
- Artist: Edmund Blair Leighton
- Year: 1889
- Medium: Oil on canvas
- Movement: Romanticism
- Dimensions: 178 cm × 119 cm (70 in × 47 in)
- Owner: Swedish private collection

Faded Laurels, also known as Fame, is a painting by Edmund Blair Leighton from 1889. It is held in a private collection, in Sweden.

== Description ==
The painting depicts an aged harpist whose fame has faded and is being overshadowed by a younger colleague, the dichotomy made obvious by their contrasting crowns of laurels. The older harpist is sitting slumped on the steps in the foreground of the image which lead down to water, and behind him a crowd is gathered outside the church to listen to the younger musician. Even the King and Queen are attending the concert, among people of various ages. According to Bukowskis, in Faded Laurels, Leighton "deals with the eternal theme of the rise and fall of fame."

== Reception ==
Faded Laurels was first exhibited at the Royal Academy of Arts in London in 1889, under the title "Fame". The painting did not receive a positive reception from art academia of the time. In Issue 3214 of the Athenaeum from 1 June 1889, in review of the Royal Academy's 1889 exhibition, one contributor says that Leighton "wastes his energies" on this "sentimental anachronism", praising the artist but judging the work negatively.

While currently unsold, the painting has an estimated value of 2,000,000–2,500,000 SEK (221,000–277,000 USD). The only known provenance of Faded Laurels is as part of a Swedish private collection, and it is currently open for bidding at the auction house Bukowskis.

== See also ==
- The Meeting on the Turret Stairs, 1864 romantic medieval painting
