= Edmund Blair Leighton =

British painter (1852–1922)

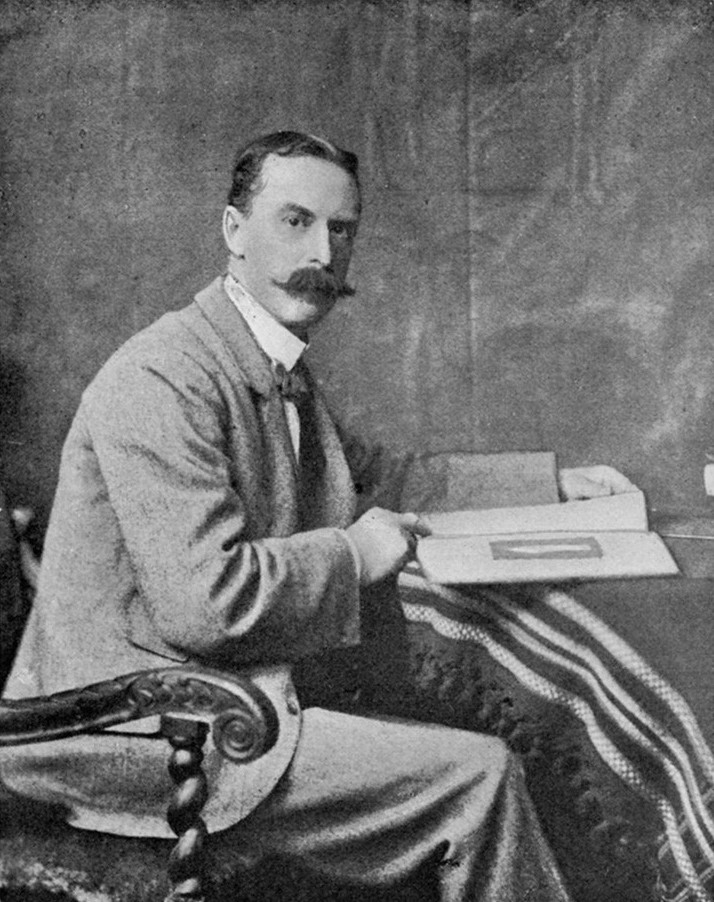
- Leighton in 1900
- Born: 21 September 1852; London, England
- Died: 1 September 1922 (aged 69); London, England
- Known for: Painting

Edmund Blair Leighton ROI (21 September 1852 – 1 September 1922) was an English painter of historical genre scenes, specialising in Regency and medieval subjects. His art is associated with the Pre-Raphaelite movement of the mid-to-late nineteenth and early twentieth centuries, though his artwork is less stylised and much more naturalistic.

== Biography ==
Leighton was the son of the artist Charles Blair Leighton (1823–1855) and Caroline Leighton (née Boosey). He was educated at University College School, leaving at 15 to work for a tea merchant. Wishing to study art, he went to evening classes in South Kensington and then to the Heatherley School of Fine Art in Newman Street, London. Aged 21, he entered the Royal Academy Schools. Among his first commissions were monochrome illustrations for Cassell's Magazine and its Book of British Ballads. His first painting to be exhibited at the Royal Academy was A Flaw in the Title in 1874; it sold for £200. He soon gave up "black and white" illustrations, working for the rest of his career in oil on canvas. He married Katherine Nash in 1885; they had a son, the painter Eric John Blair Leighton, and a daughter, Sophie Helen Blair Leighton. He exhibited annually at the Royal Academy until 1920.

Leighton was a fastidious craftsman, producing highly finished, decorative historical paintings. These were romanticised scenes, often of chivalry and women in medieval dress with a popular appeal. It would appear that he left no diaries, and though he exhibited at the Royal Academy for over forty years, he was never an Academician or an Associate.

== Works ==
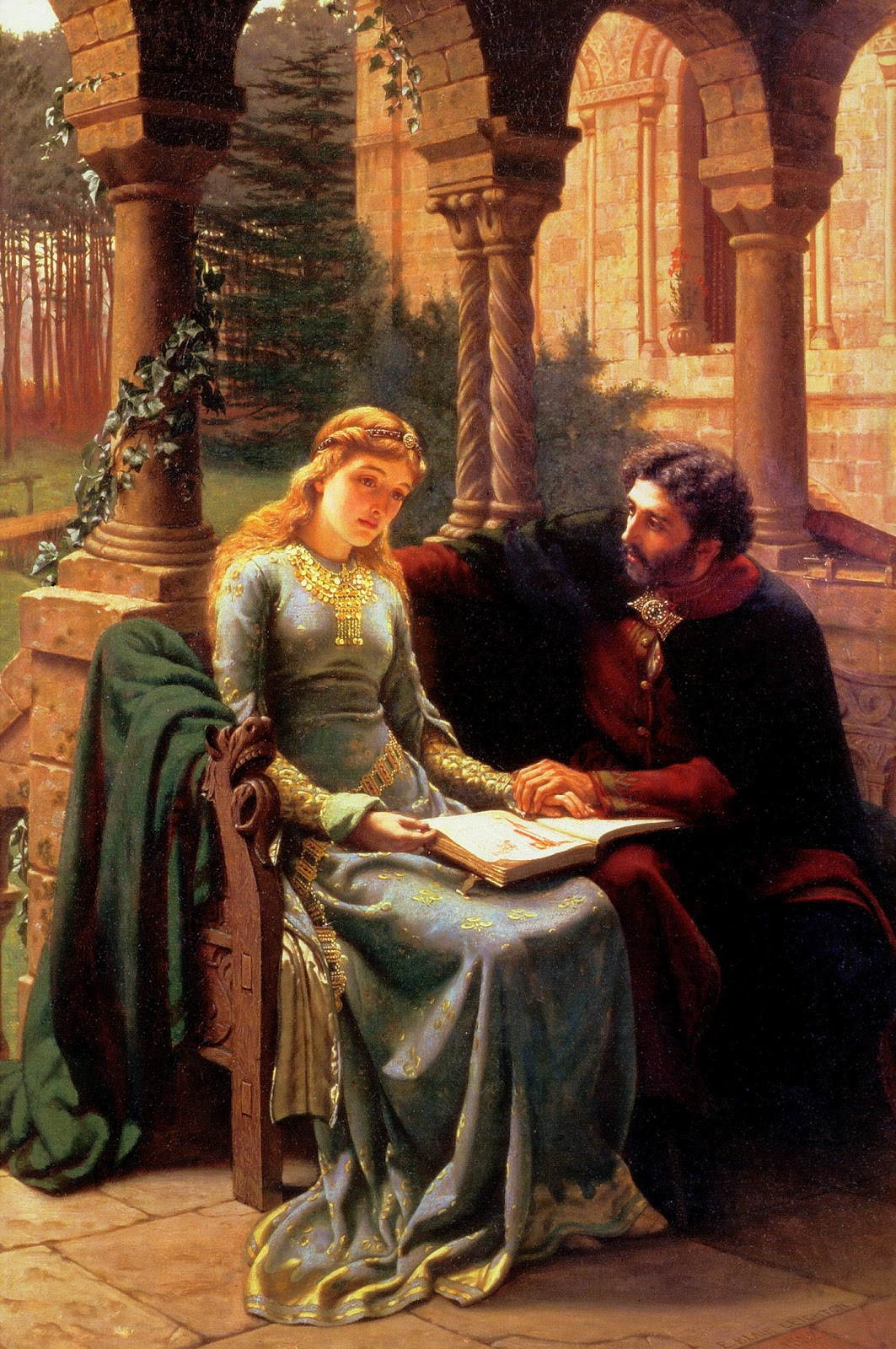
Abelard and His Pupil Heloise (1882)

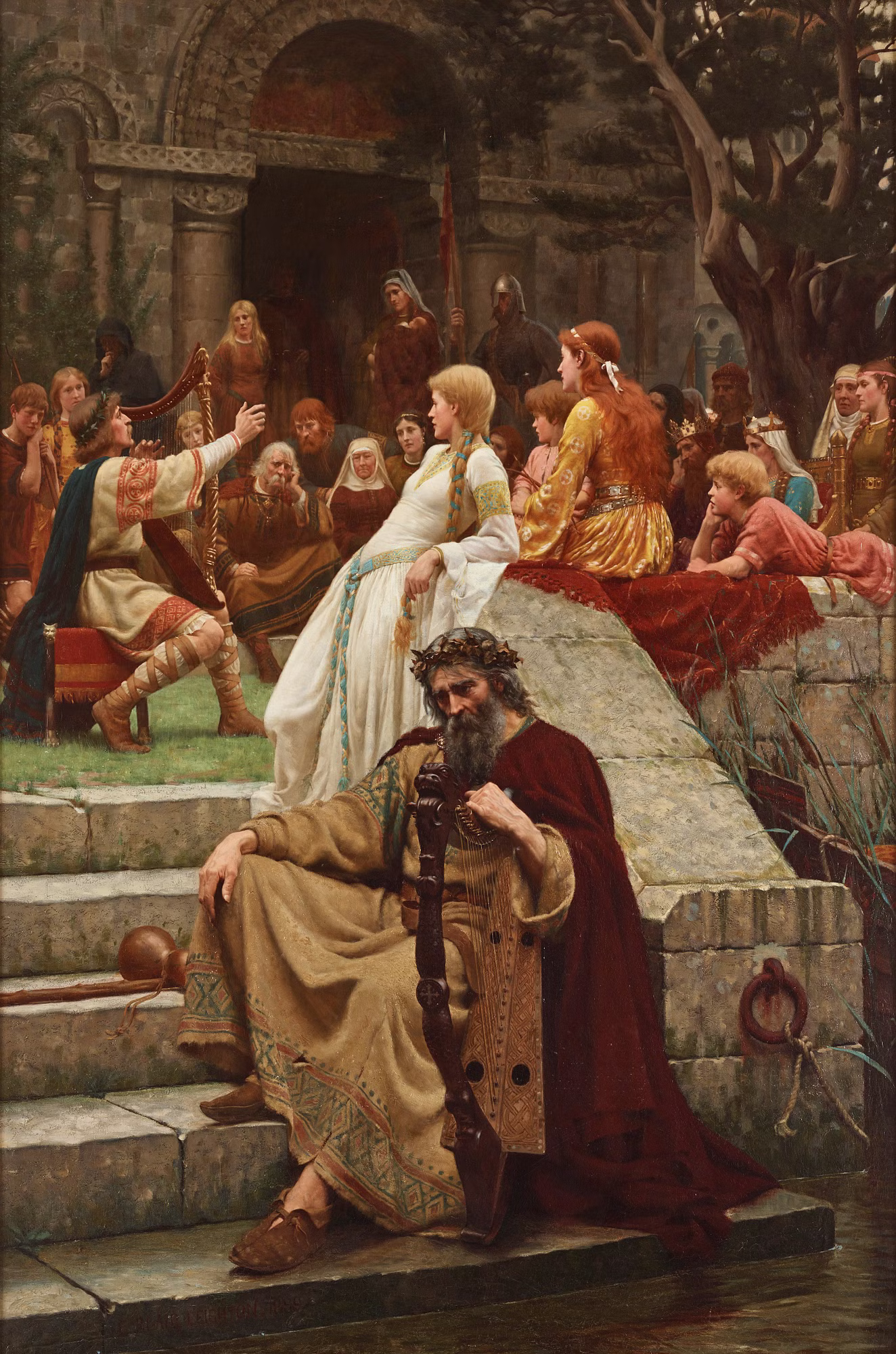
Faded Laurels (1889)

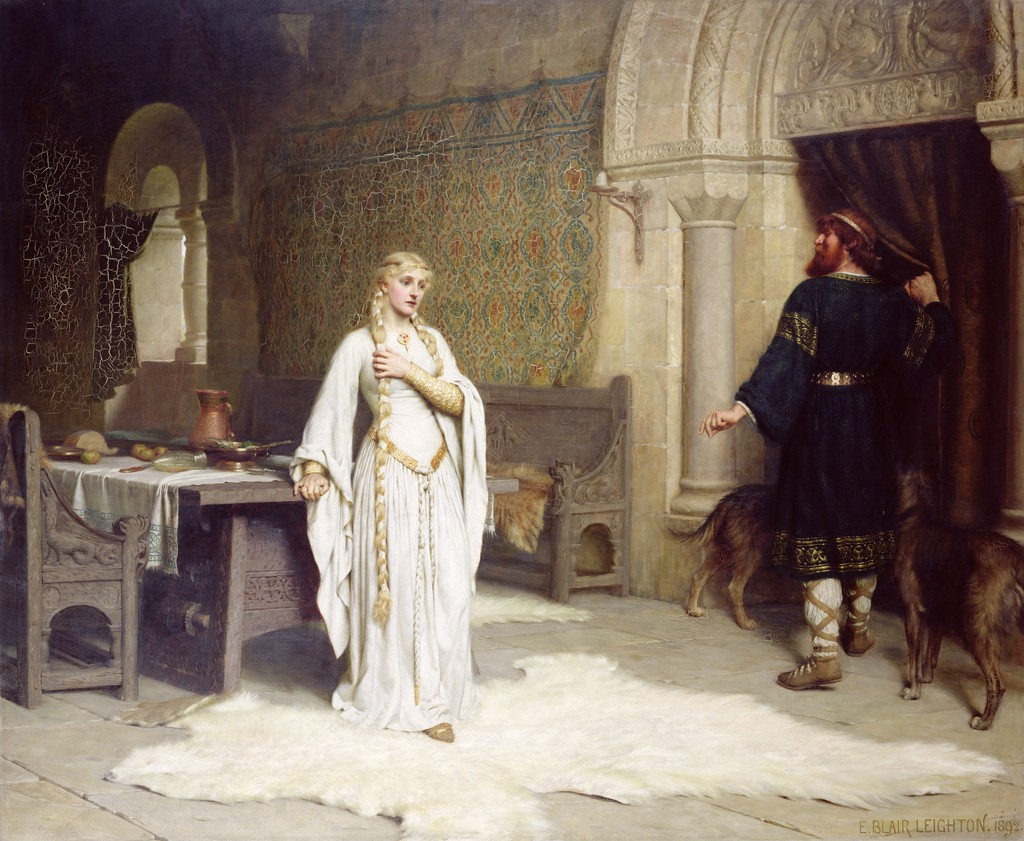
Lady Godiva (1892)

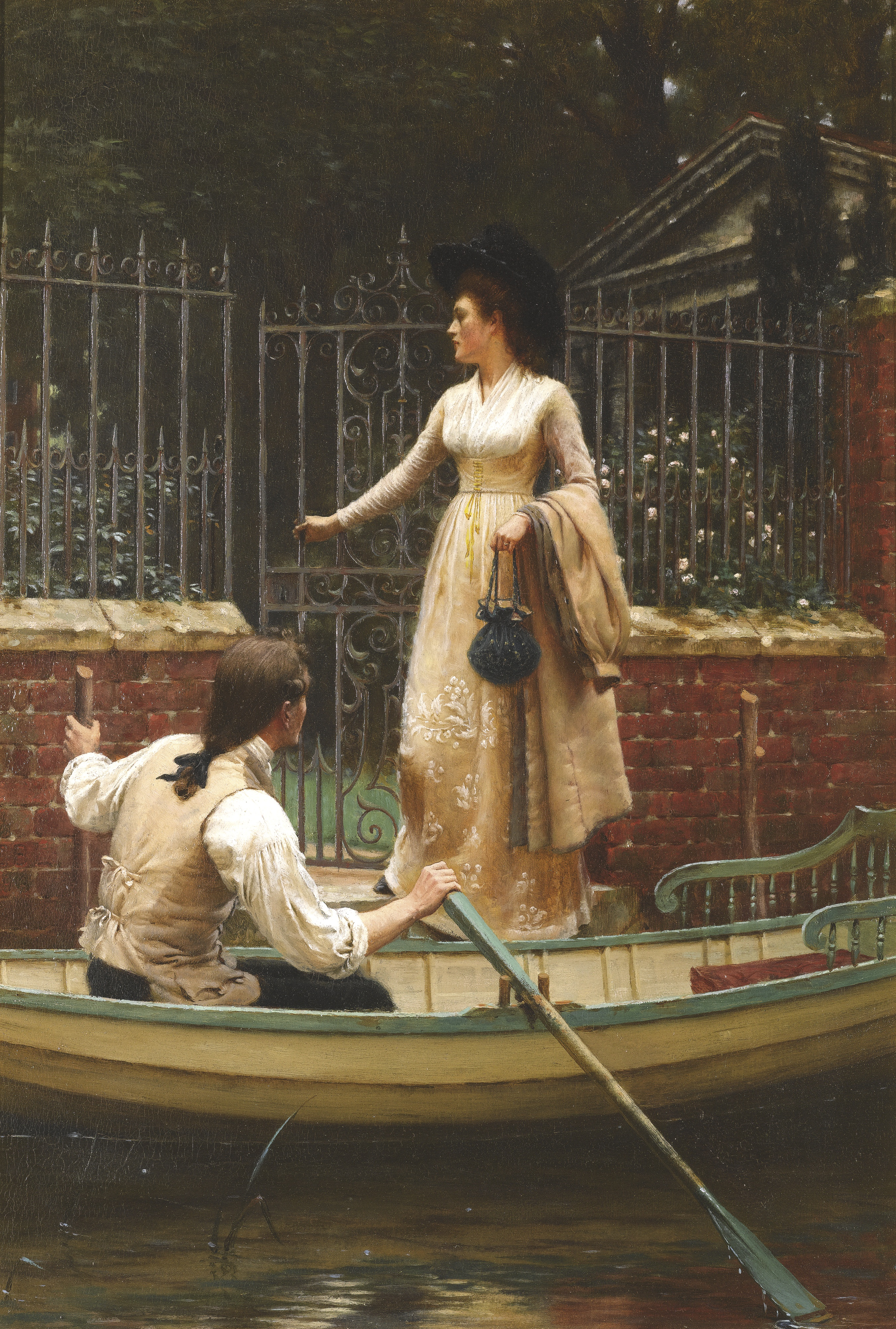
The Elopement (1893)

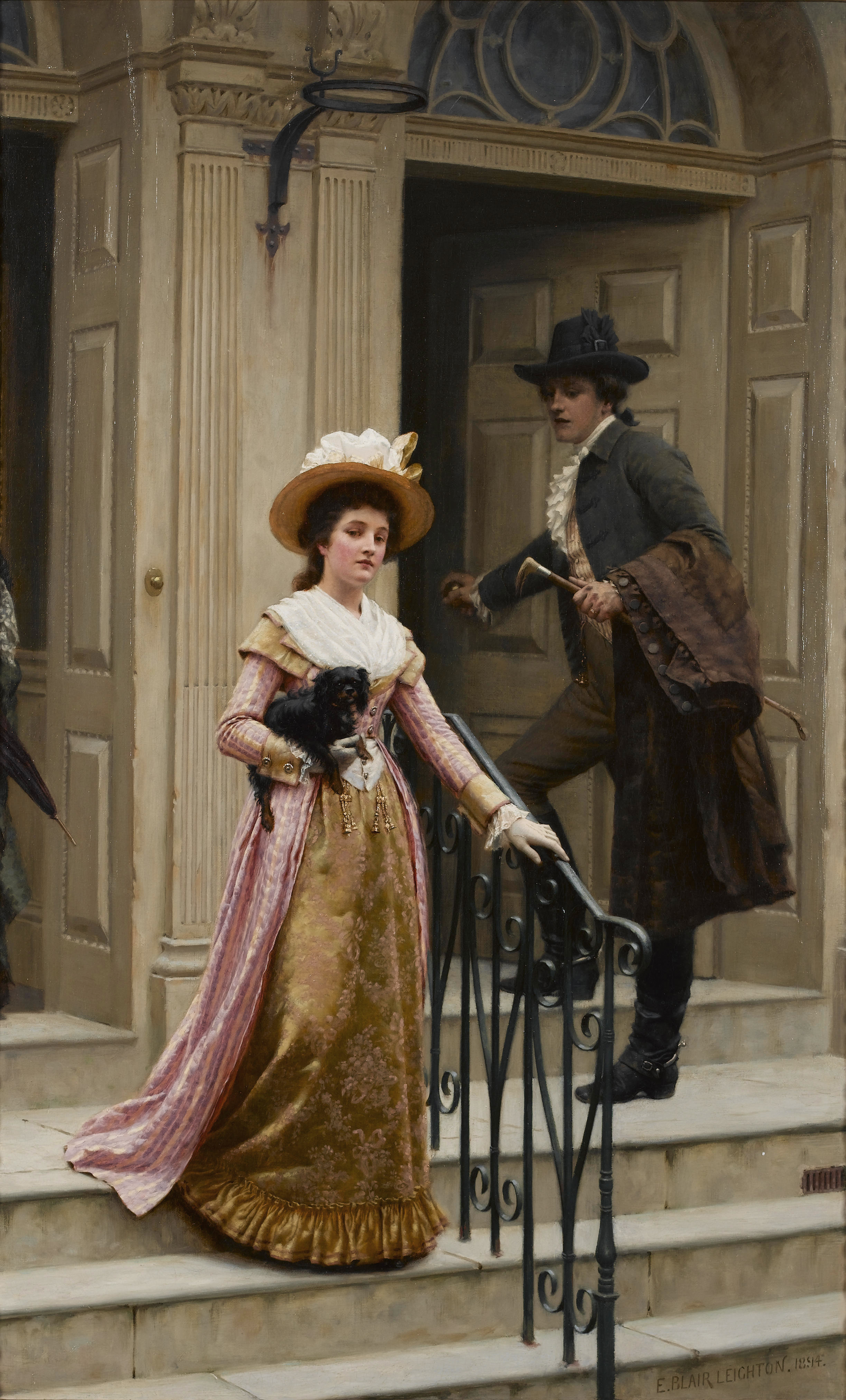
My Next-Door Neighbour (1894)

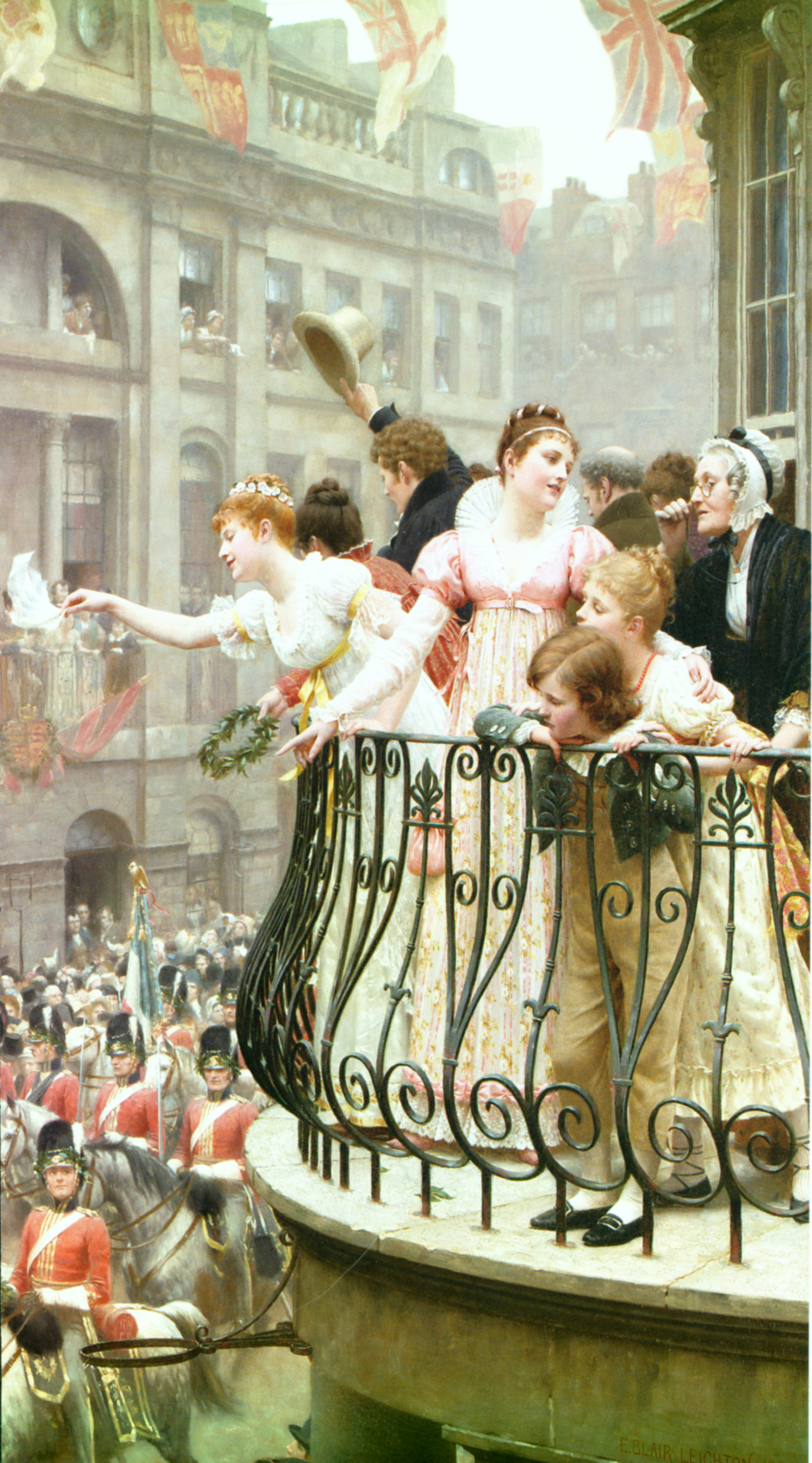
In 1816 (1895)

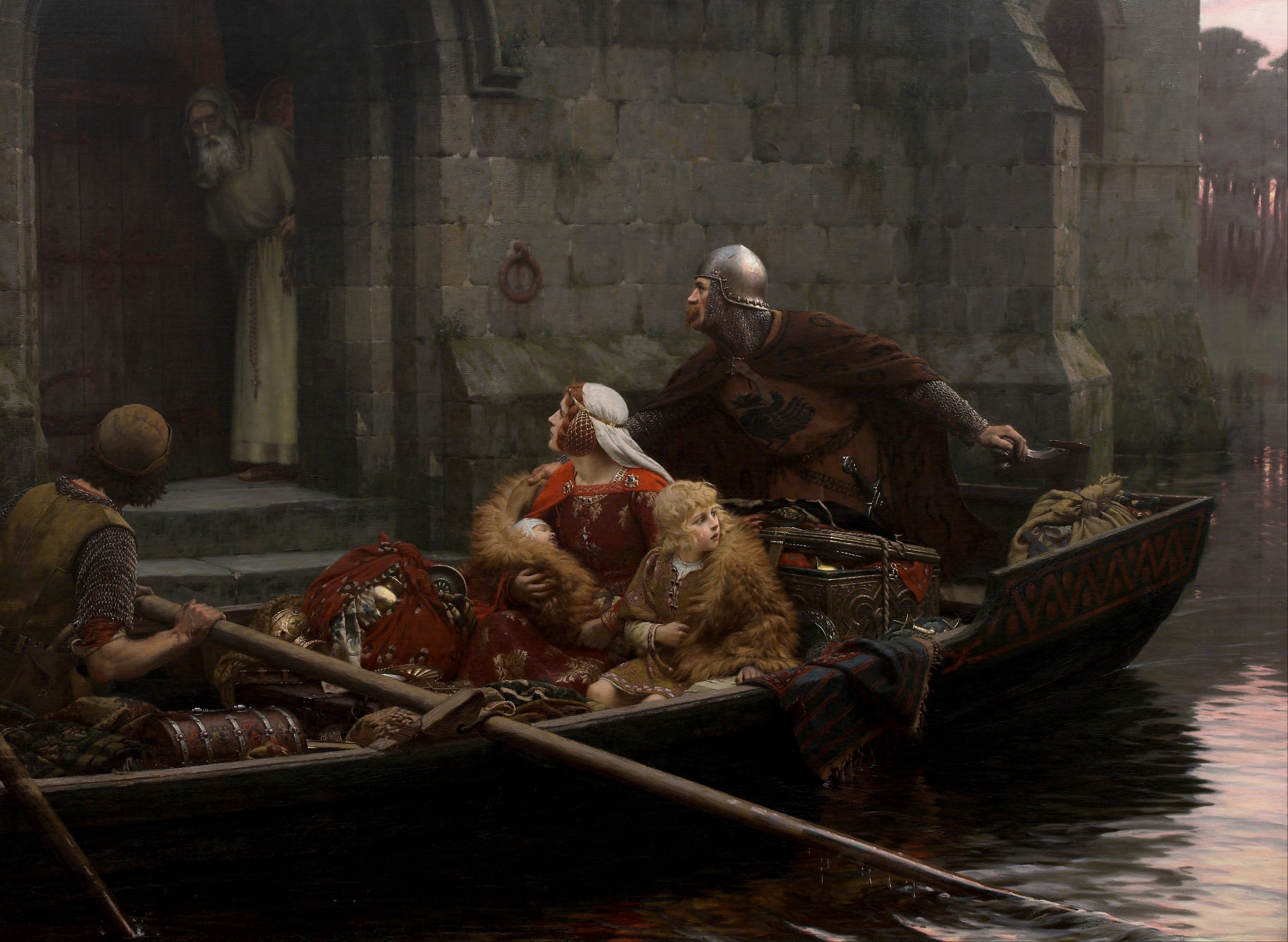
In Time of Peril (1897)

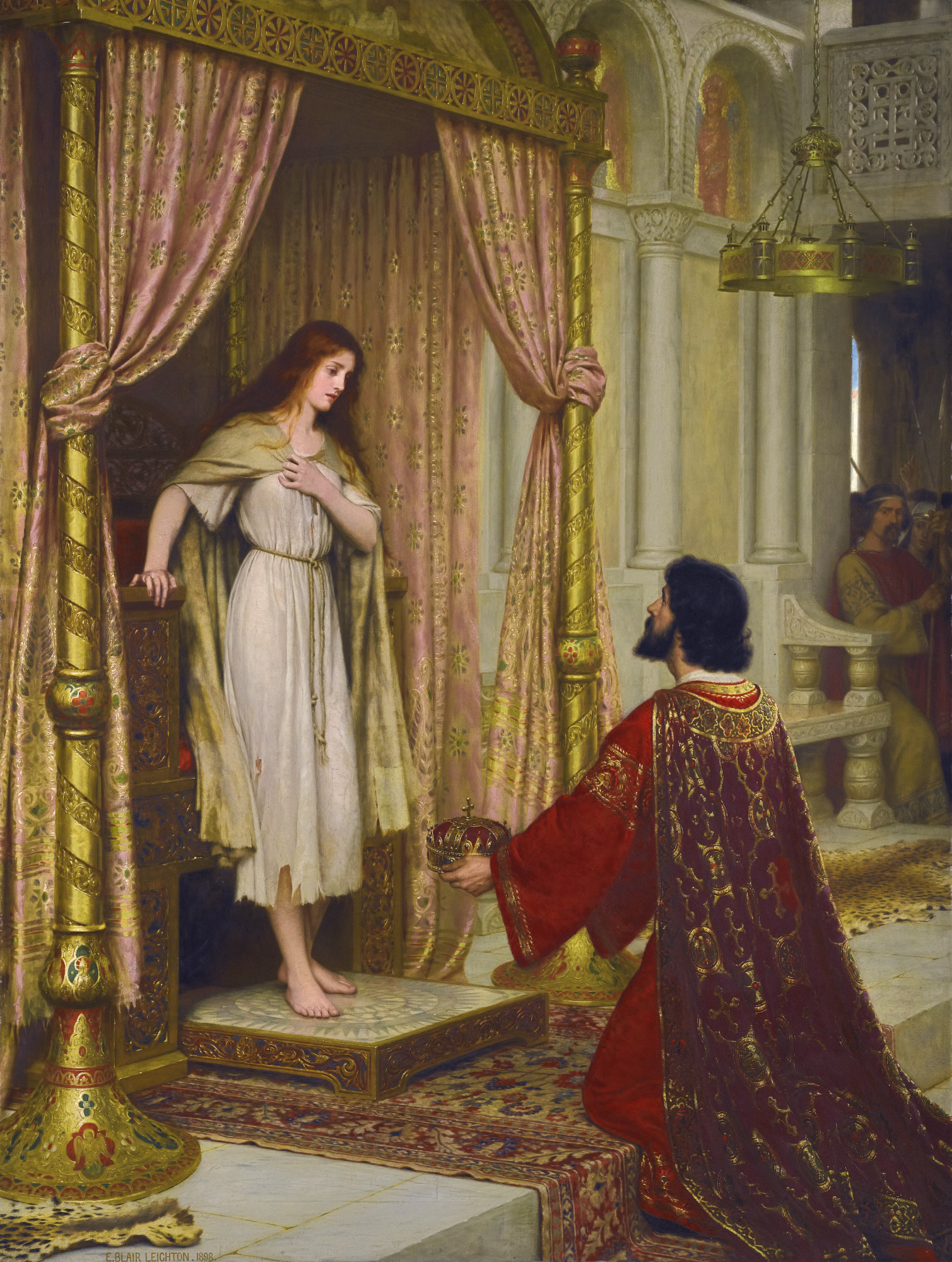
The King and the Beggar-maid (1898) (legend)

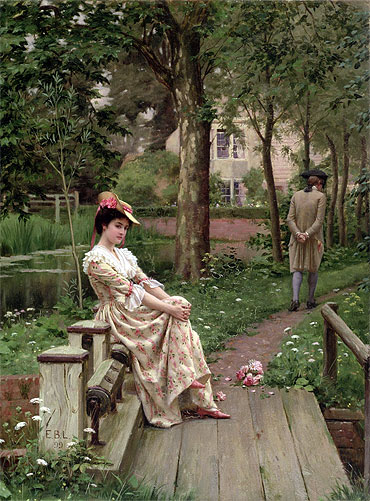
Off (1899)

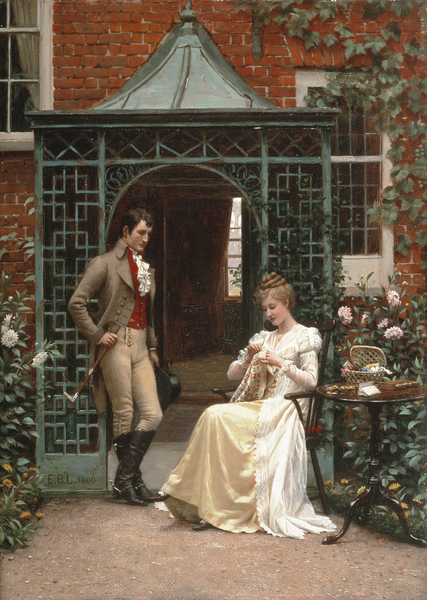
On the Threshold (1900)

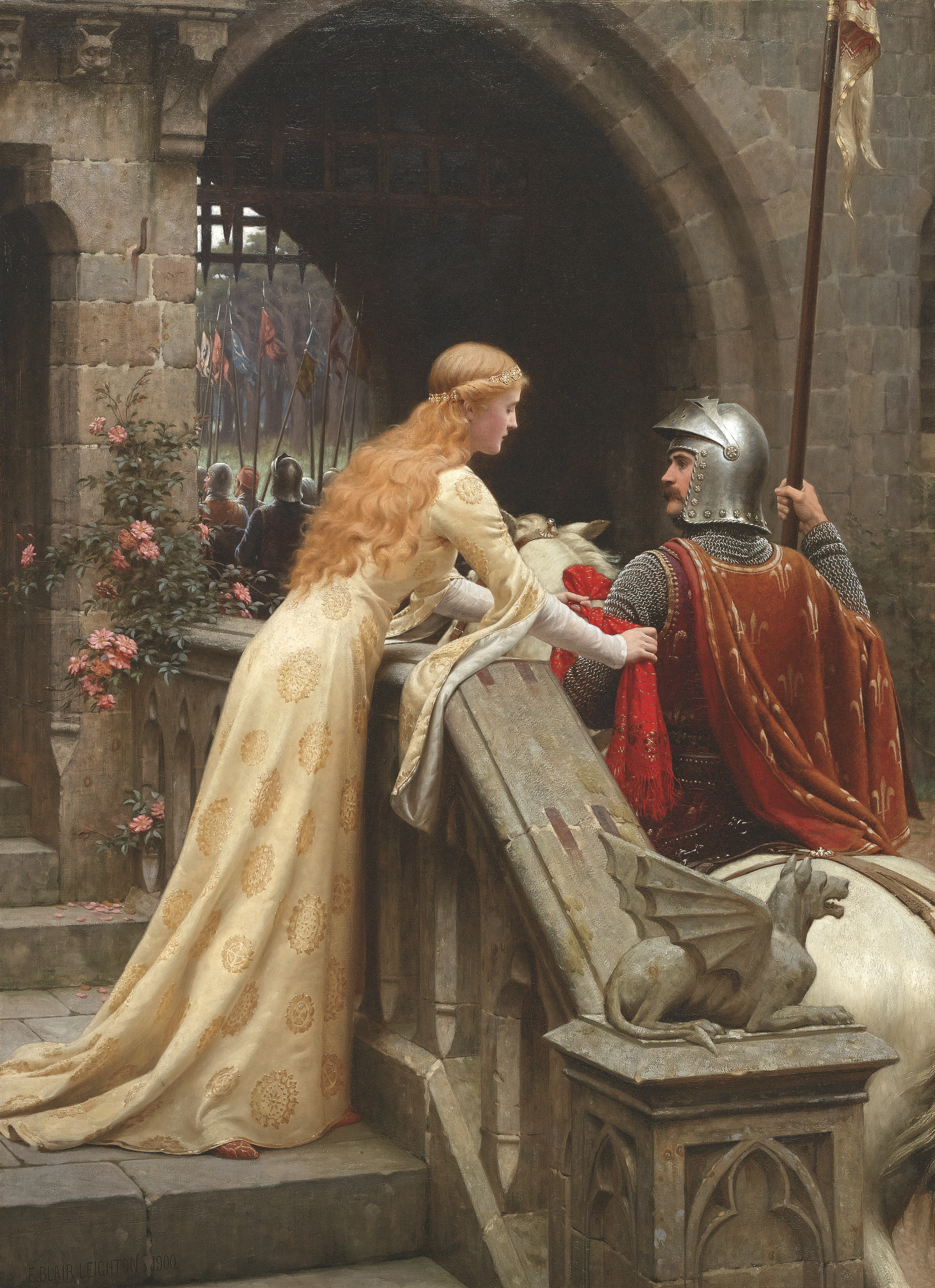
God Speed! (1900)

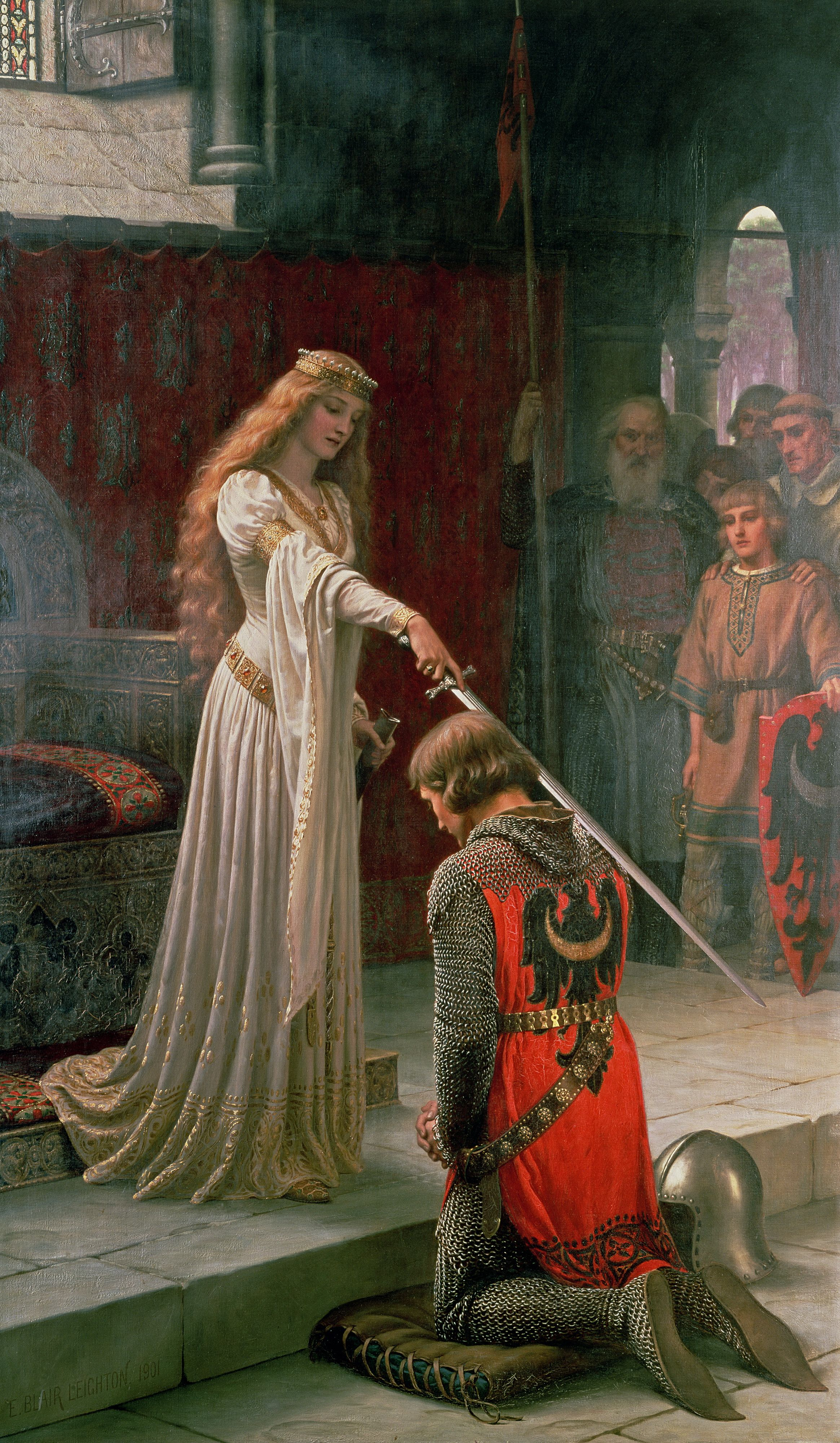
The Accolade (1901)

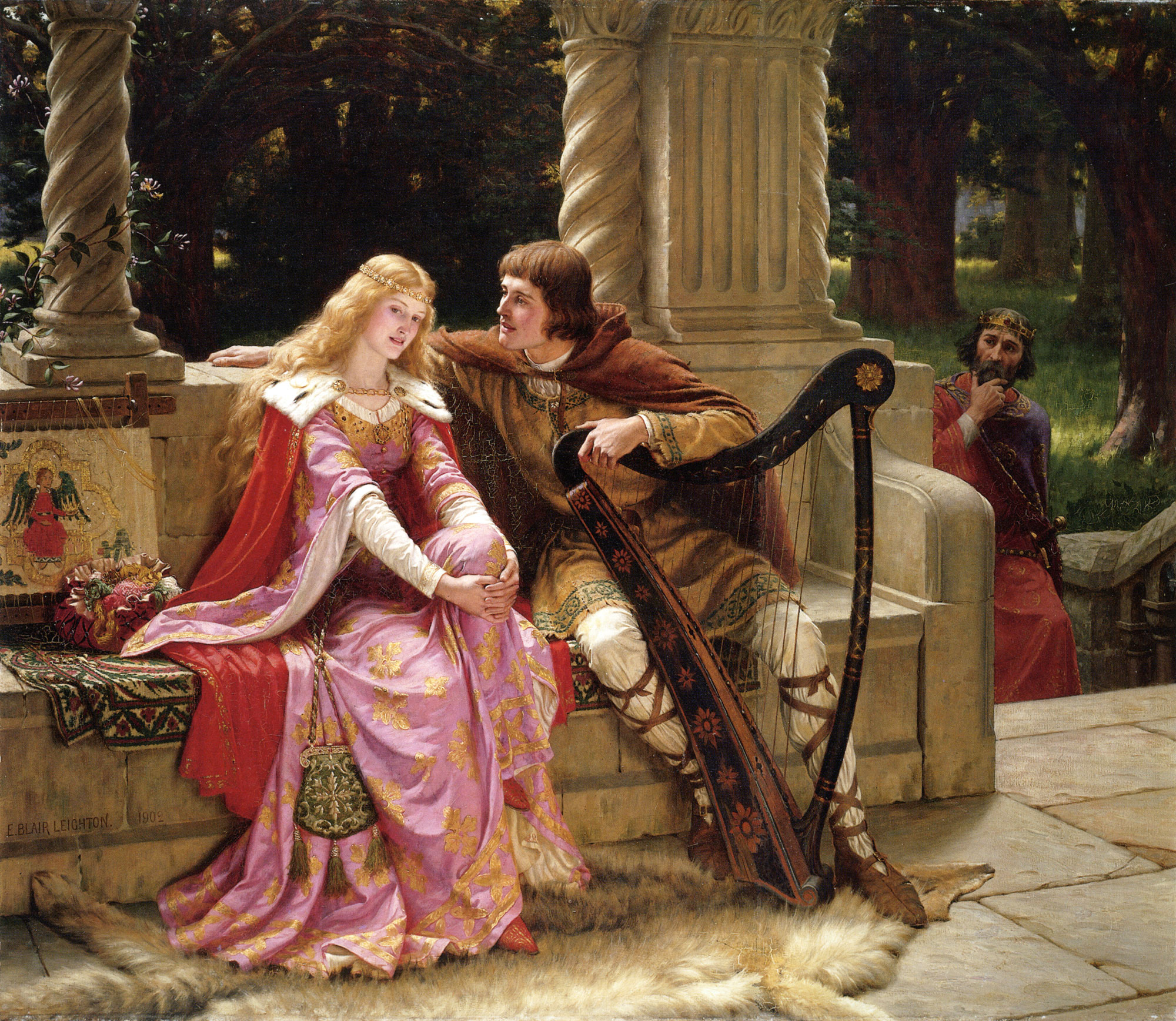
Tristan and Isolde or The End of the Song (1902)

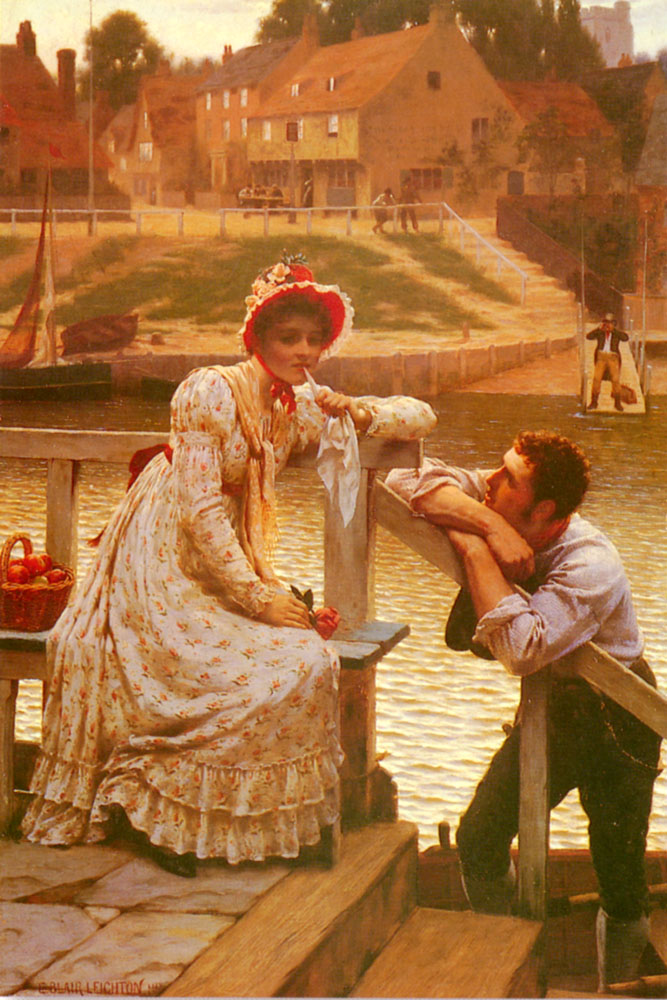
Courtship (1903)

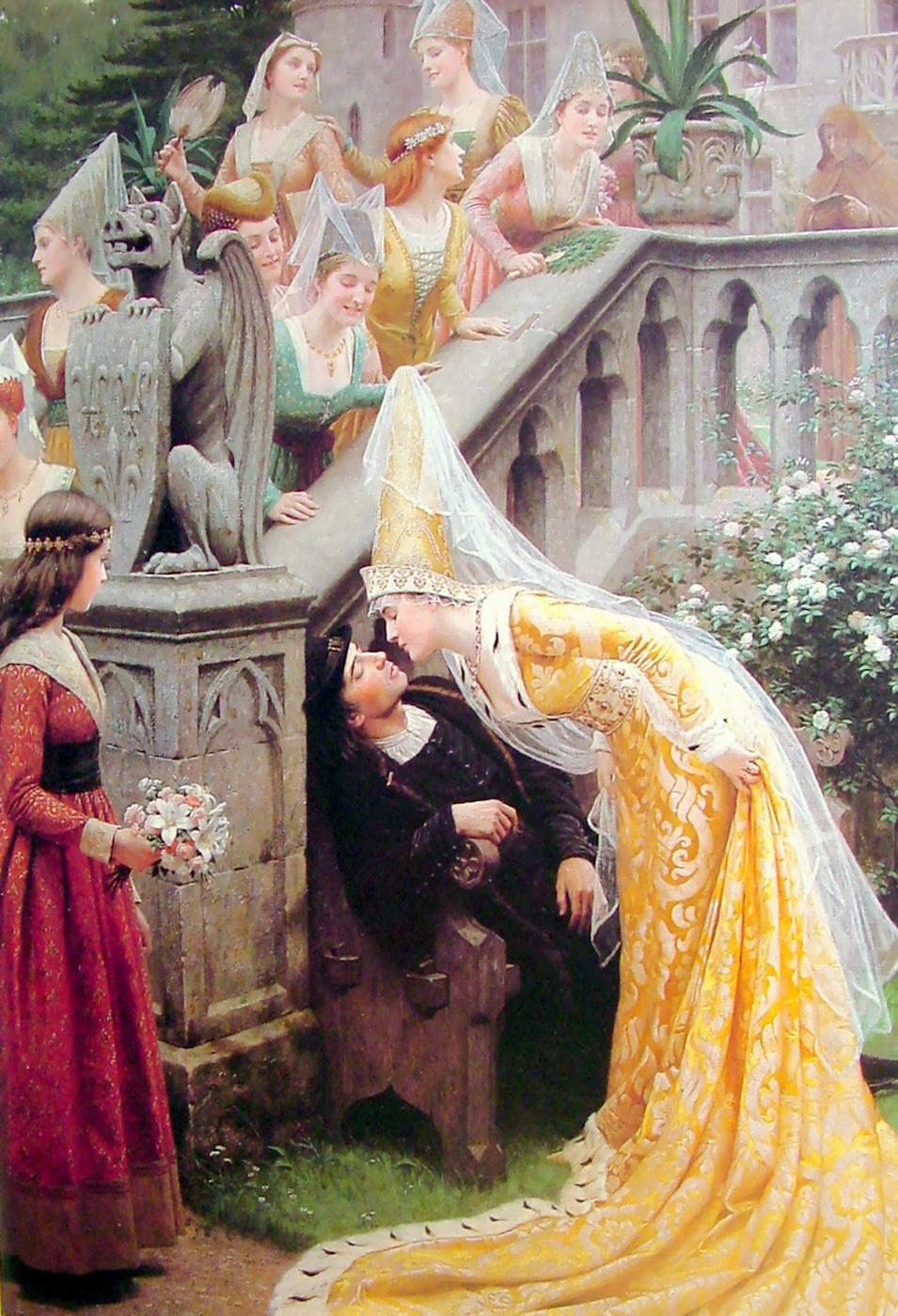
The Queen Kisses the Sleeping Poet Alain Chartier (1903)

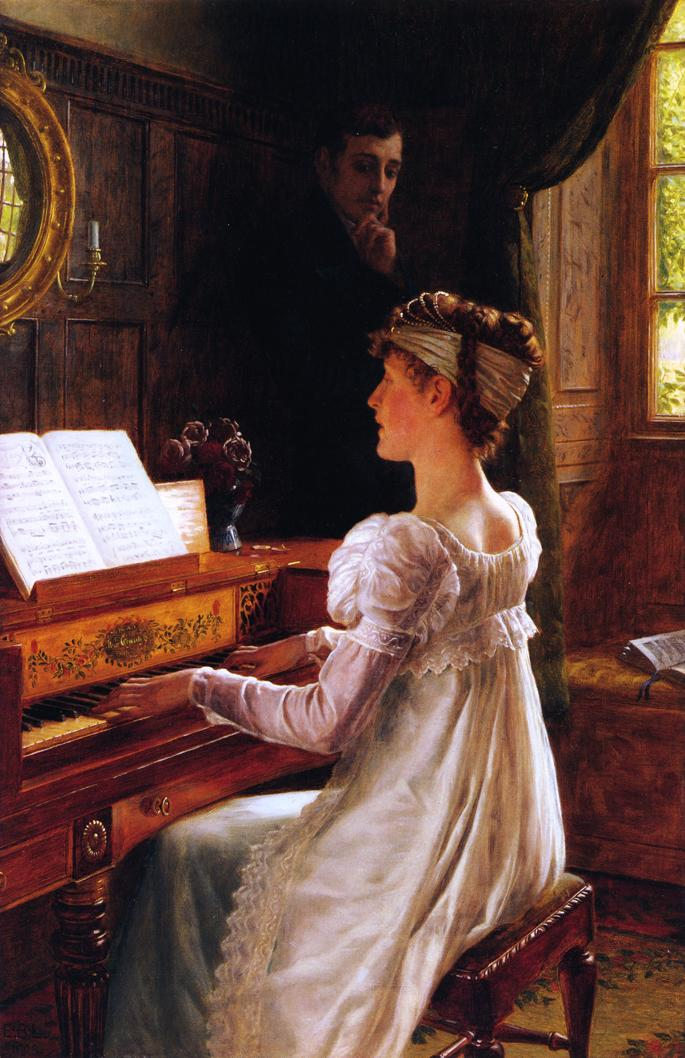
Courtship by the Piano (1903)

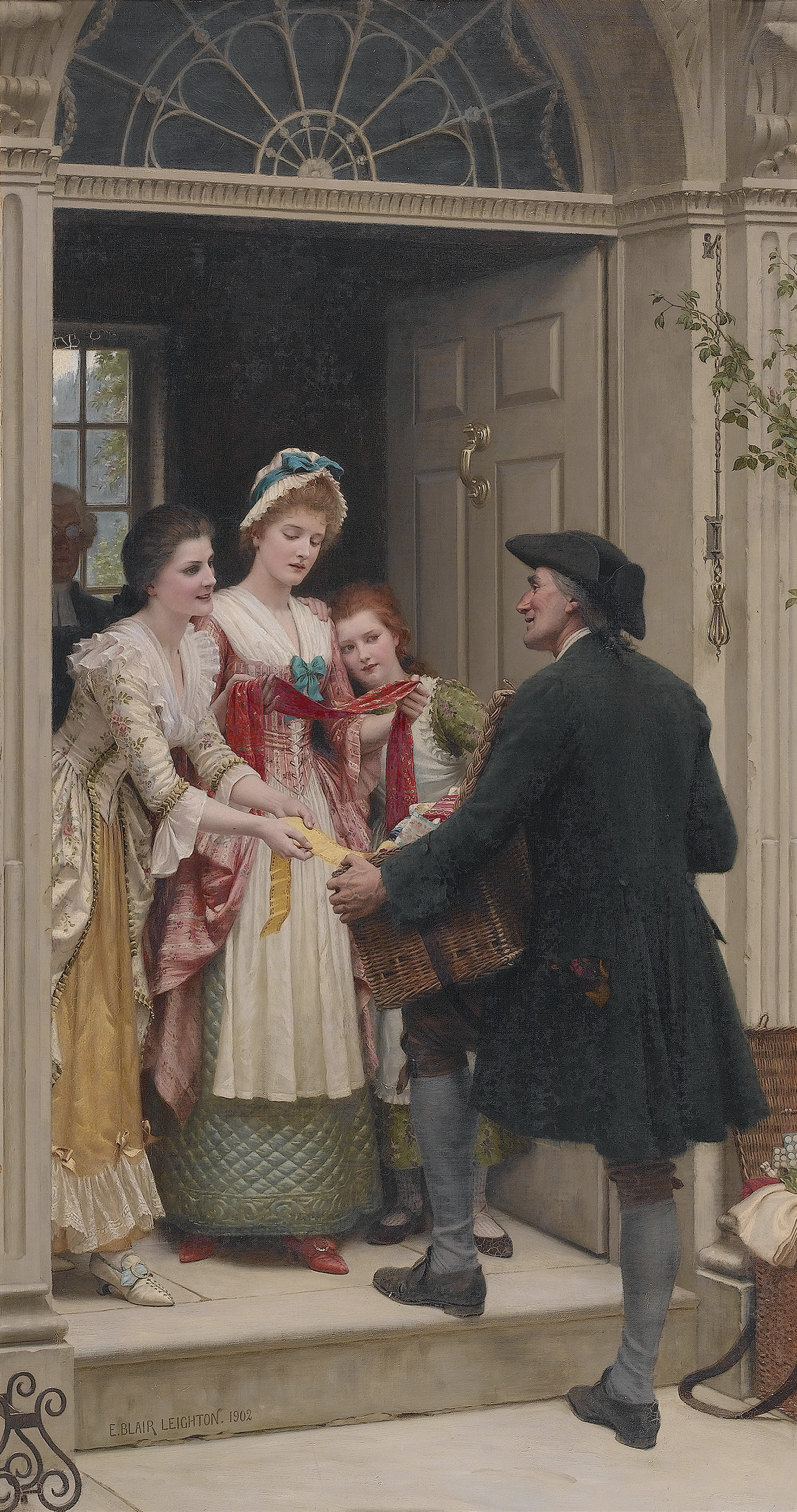
Ribbons and Laces for Very Pretty Faces (1904)

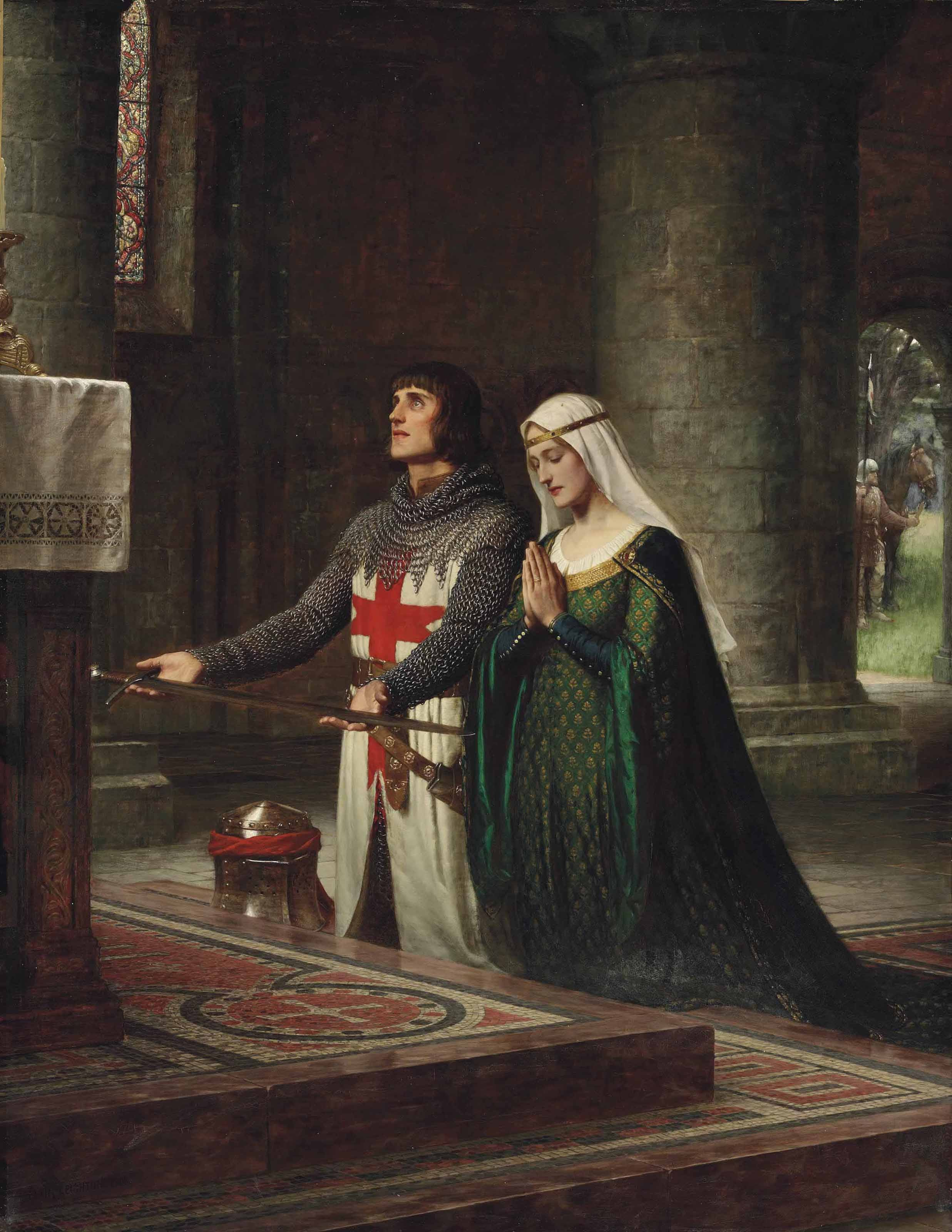
The Dedication (1908)

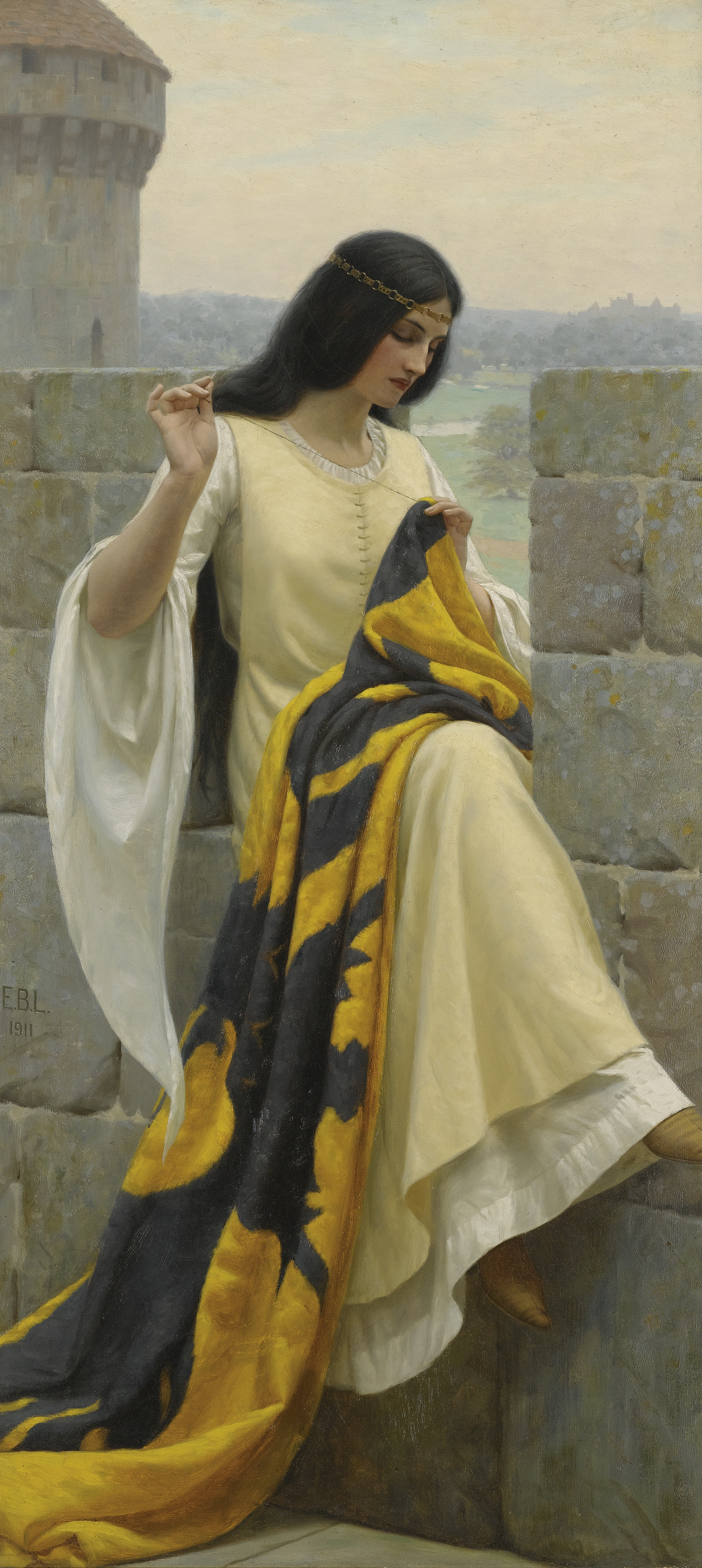
Stitching the Standard (1911)

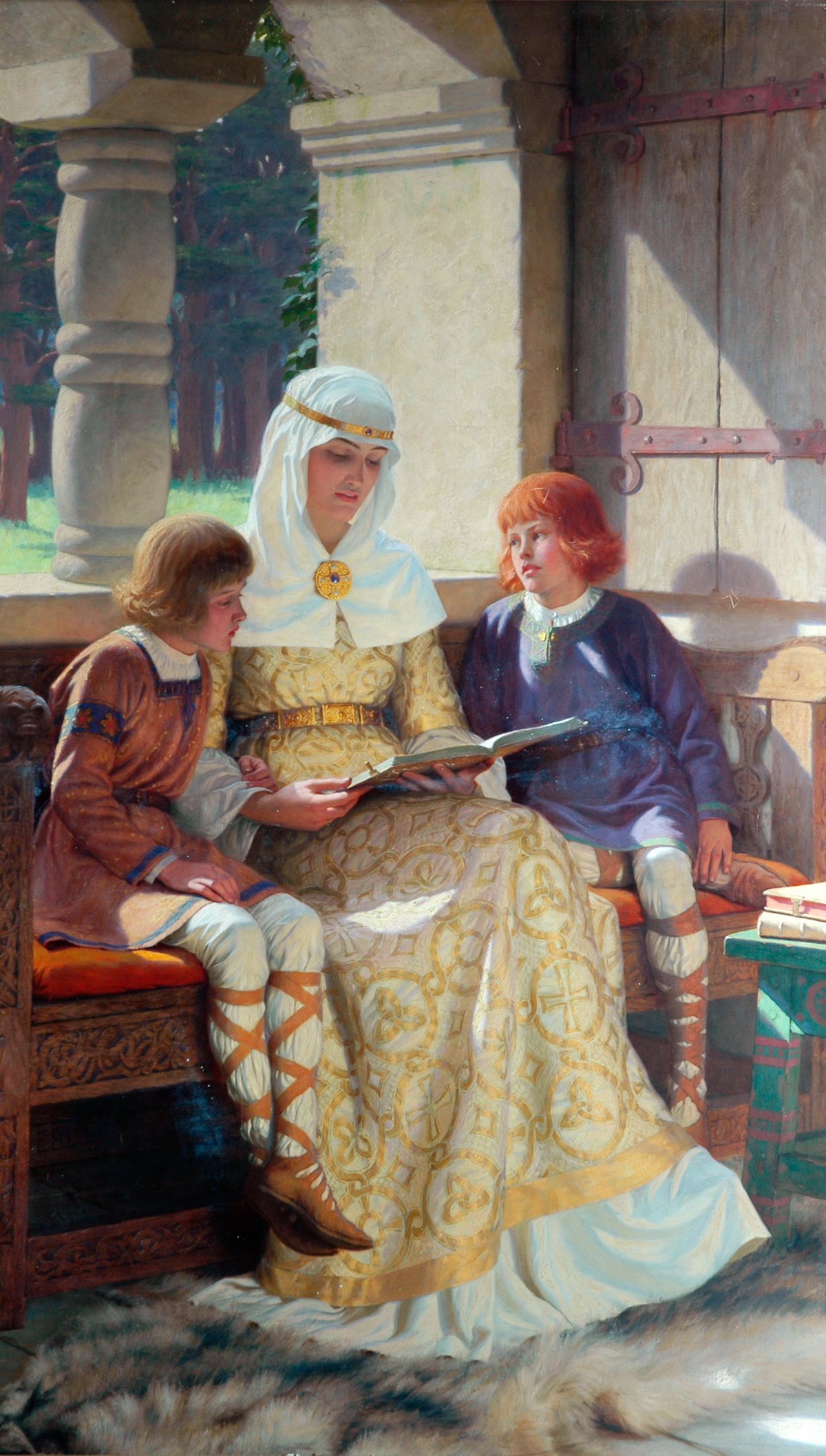
The Boyhood of Alfred the Great (1913)

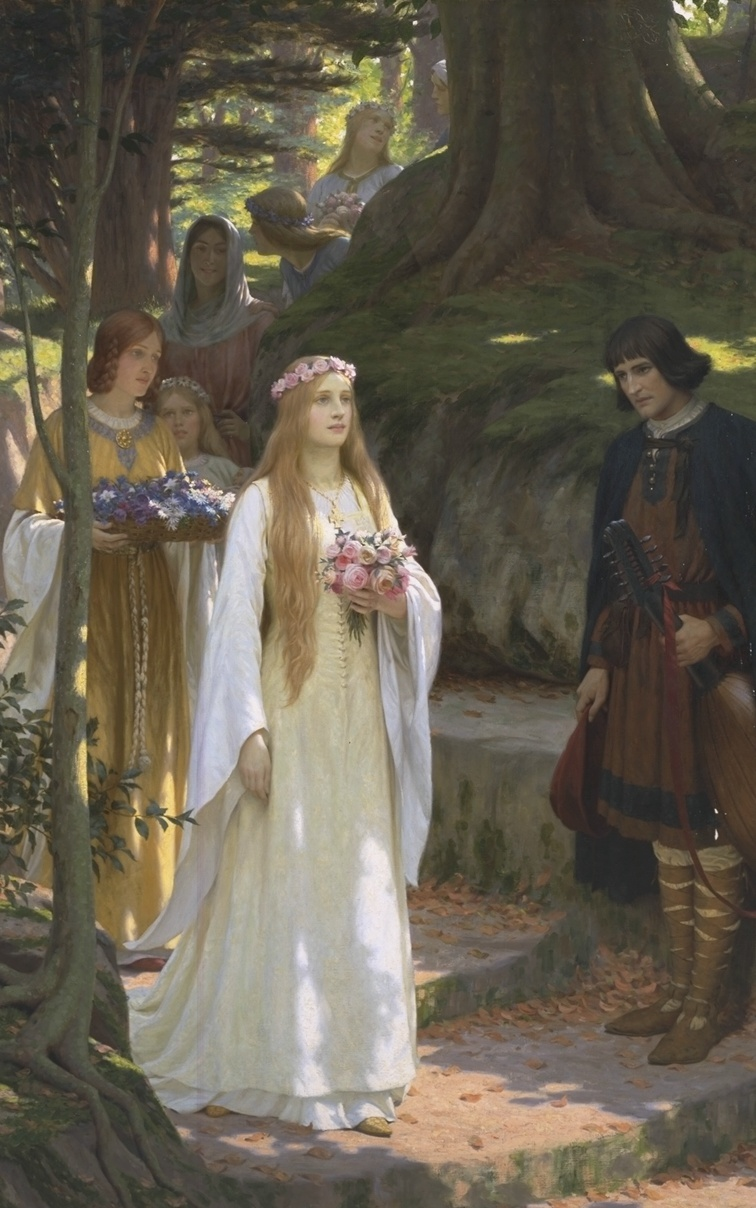
My Fair Lady (1914)

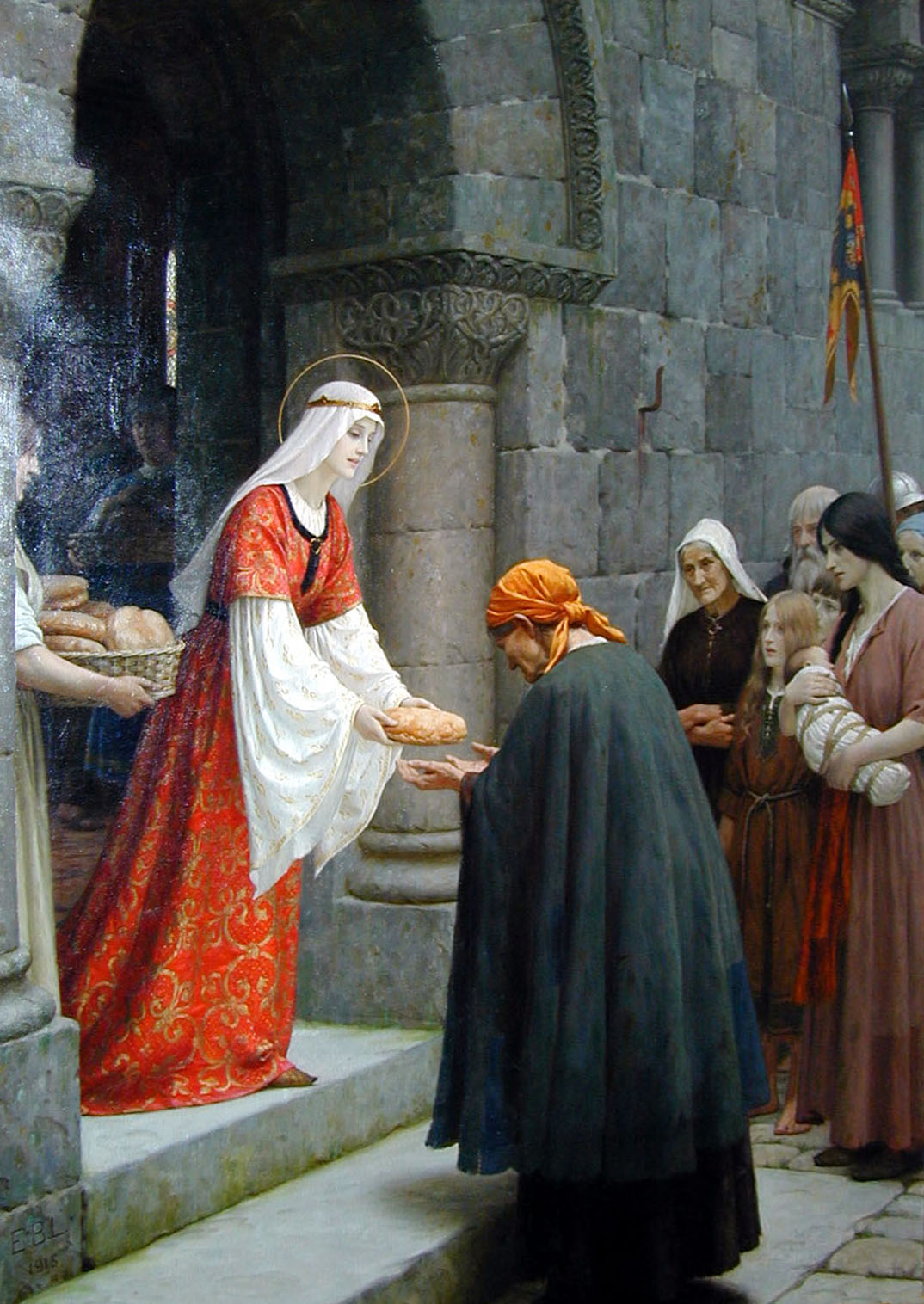
The Charity of Elisabeth of Hungary (1915)

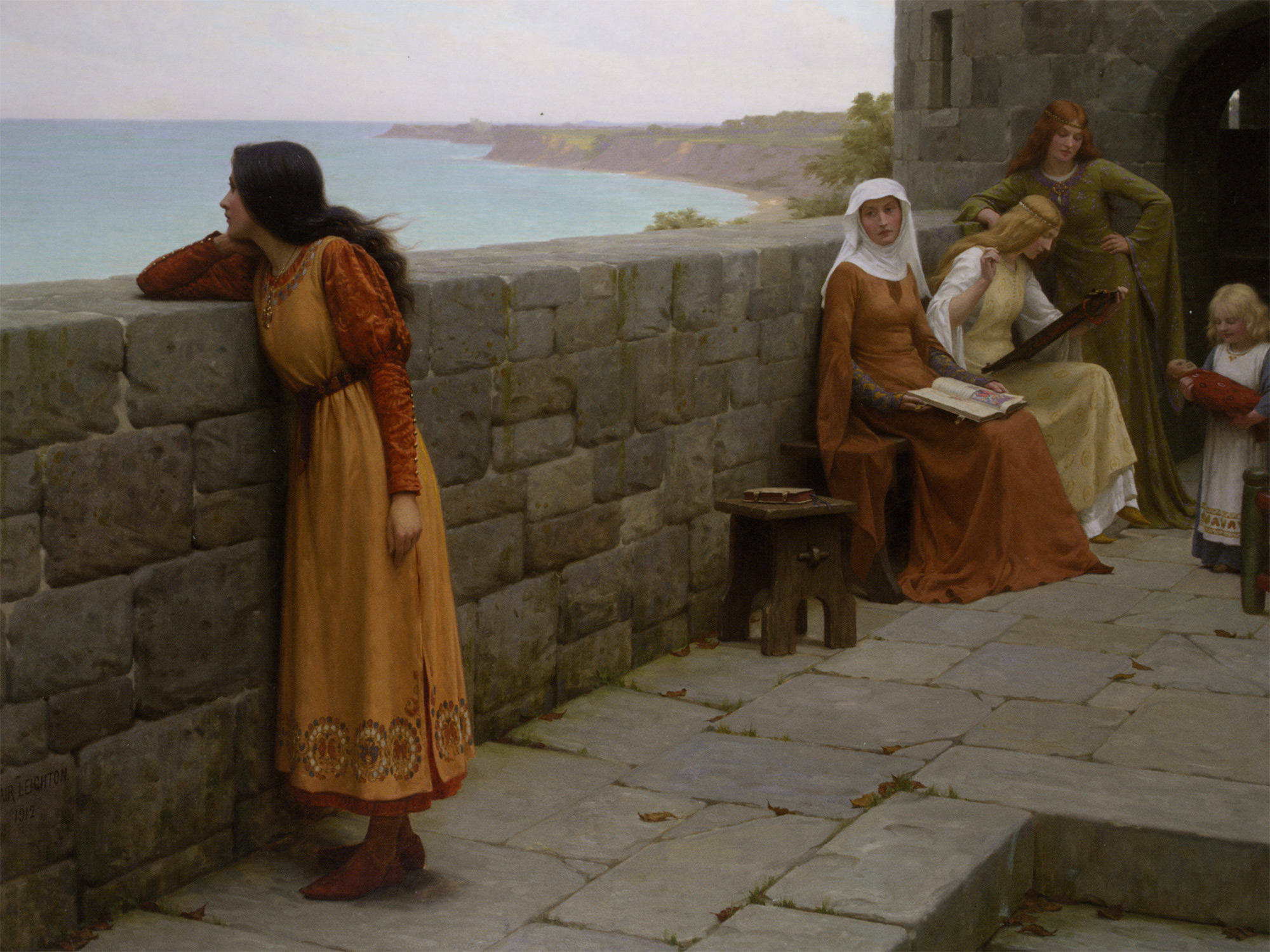
The Hostage (1912)

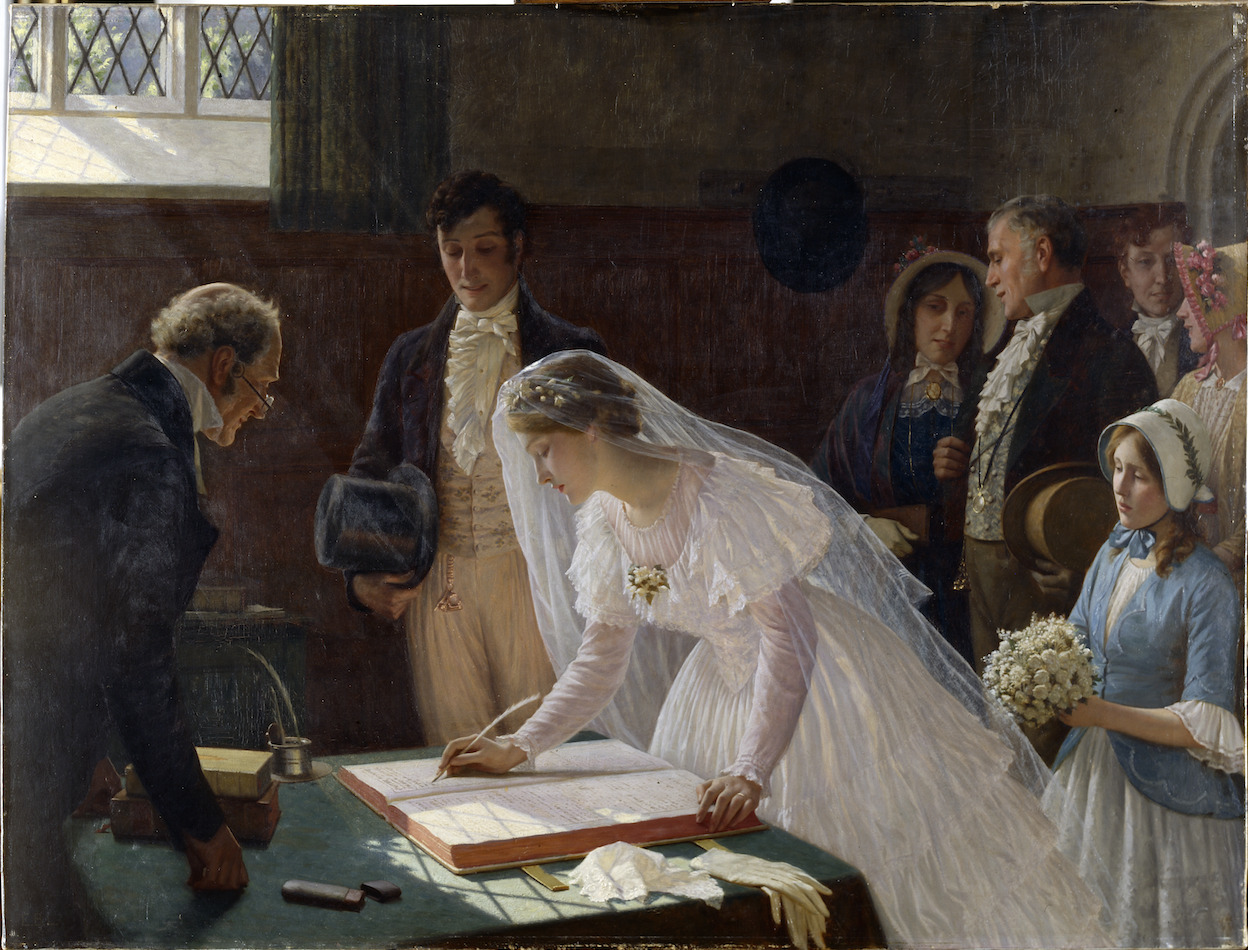
Signing the Register (1920)

Among Leighton's other works are:

- Un Gage d'Amour (1881), Auckland Art Gallery Toi o Tamaki.
- Conquest (1884)
- A Call to Arms (1888), private collection
- The Rehearsal (1888), Croydon Clocktower, UK.
- How Liza Loved the King (1890), Towneley Hall Art Gallery and Museum, Burnley.
- Waiting for the Coach (1895), Manchester Art Gallery.
- On the Threshold (1900), Manchester Art Gallery.
- The Accolade (1901), private collection.
- Adieu (1901), Manchester Art Gallery.
- The Shadow (1909), City Hall, Cardiff
- A Nibble (1914), private collection.
- An Arrival (1916), City Hall, Cardiff
- The Lord of Burleigh, Tennyson (1919), private collection.
- Sweet Solitude (1919), private collection.
- After Service (1921), private collection.
- The Fond Farewell (1891), Messum's, London.
- Lord of the Manor (undated), private collection.
- Sorrow and Song (undated), Bristol City Museum and Art Gallery.

== Bibliography ==
- Yockley, Alfred (December 1913). "The Art of Edmund Blair Leighton". Art Annual (Christmas 1913). London: 11, 31, illustrations.
- De Cordova, Rudolph (1905). "The Art of Mr. E. Blair Leighton". The Windsor Magazine. 21 (December 1904 to May 1905). London: Ward, Lock & Co. Archived from the original on 18 September 2016.
