= God Speed (painting) =

1900 painting by Edmund Leighton

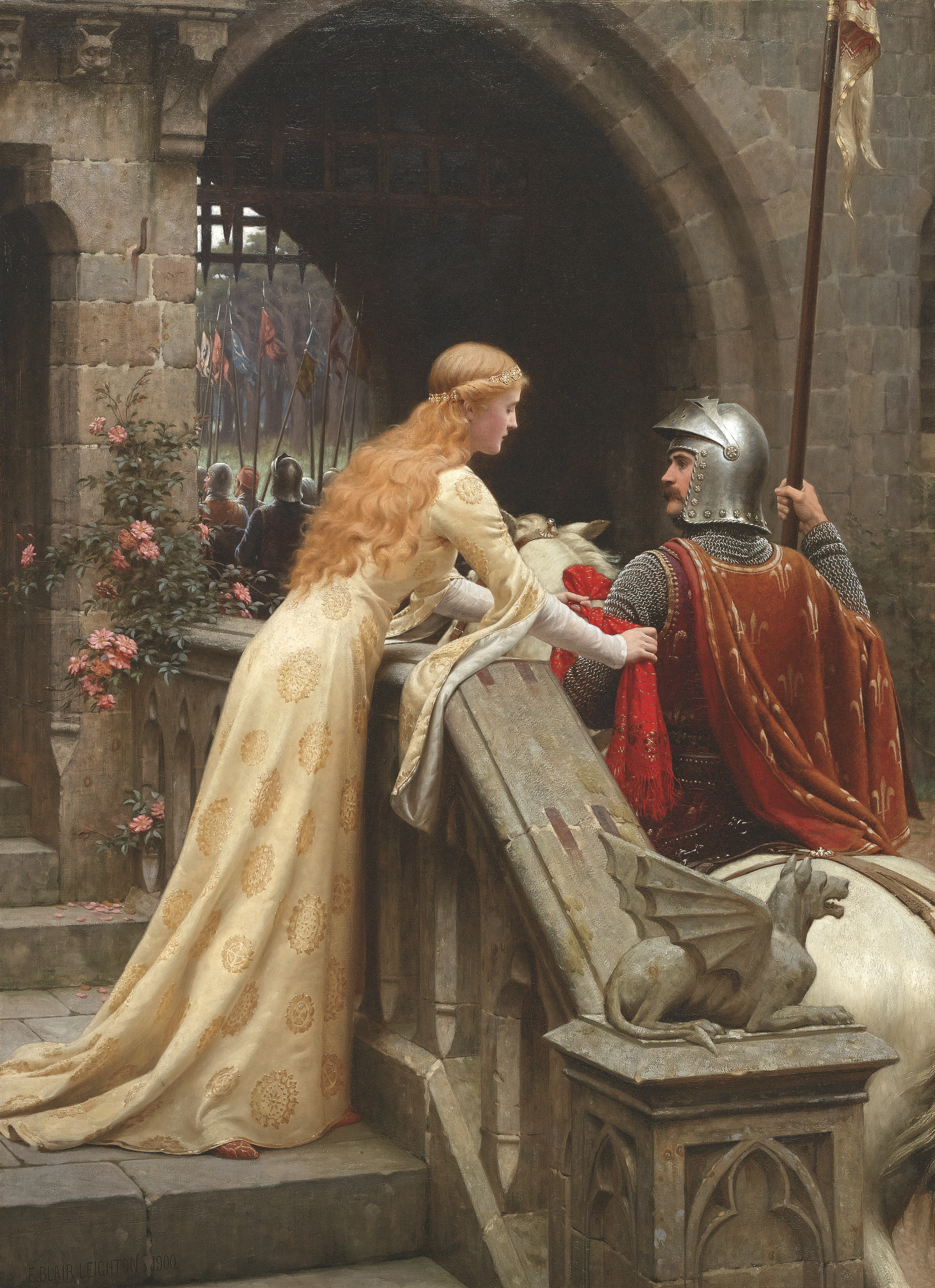
- Artist: Edmund Leighton
- Year: 1900
- Medium: Oil on canvas
- Dimensions: 160 cm × 116 cm (63 in × 46 in)
- Location: Private collection

God Speed is an oil on canvas painting by English artist Edmund Leighton, from 1900. It is held in a private collection.

== Composition ==
It depicts a Medieval scene, where an armoured (in chain mail) knight is departing to war and leaving his beloved behind. As he is leaving, she ties a red sash around the knight's arm, bidding farewell before battle. A griffin on the banister of the stairs is a symbol of strength and military courage.

God Speed was the first of several paintings by Leighton during the 1900s on the subject of chivalry, including The Accolade (1901) and The Dedication (1908). The painting was exhibited at the Royal Academy of Arts in 1900. When the painting was ready for transportation to the Royal Academy, Leighton made a last-moment change in the studio. He scraped out the work of a week and within two hours made his desired change.

== Provenance ==
After being bought from Leighton, the painting was owned by several people in succession and eventually was put up for sale at Christie's, in 1988. It was then held in an American private collection, and in 2000 was once again submitted to Christie's for sale.

In 2007, the painting appeared at Sotheby's and was sold to a British private collection. On 10 May 2012, God Speed was sold again through Sotheby's in London to a private collector for £481,250.
