= Monocle =

Type of corrective lens

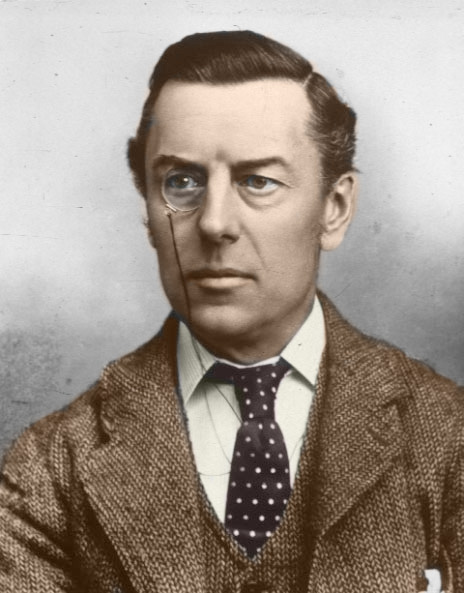
Joseph Chamberlain wearing a monocle

A monocle is a type of corrective lens used to correct or enhance the visual perception in only one eye. It consists of a circular lens placed in front of the eye and held in place by the eye socket itself. Often, to avoid losing the monocle, a string or wire is connected to the wearer's clothing at one end and, at the other end, to either a hole in the lens or, more often, a wire ring around its circumference.

Monocles were in fashion in the late 19th and early 20th centuries, but faded out of use as eyeglasses manufacturing technology improved.

== Origins ==
The Prussian antiquarian Philipp von Stosch used a monocle as a loupe in the 1720s, employing it to closely examine engravings and antique engraved gems. The dandy's quizzing glass of the 1790s was an article of high fashion, which differs from the monocle in being held to one's eye with a handle in a fashion similar to a lorgnette, rather than being held in place by the eye socket itself. The monocle did not become an article of gentlemen's apparel until the 19th century.

== Styles ==
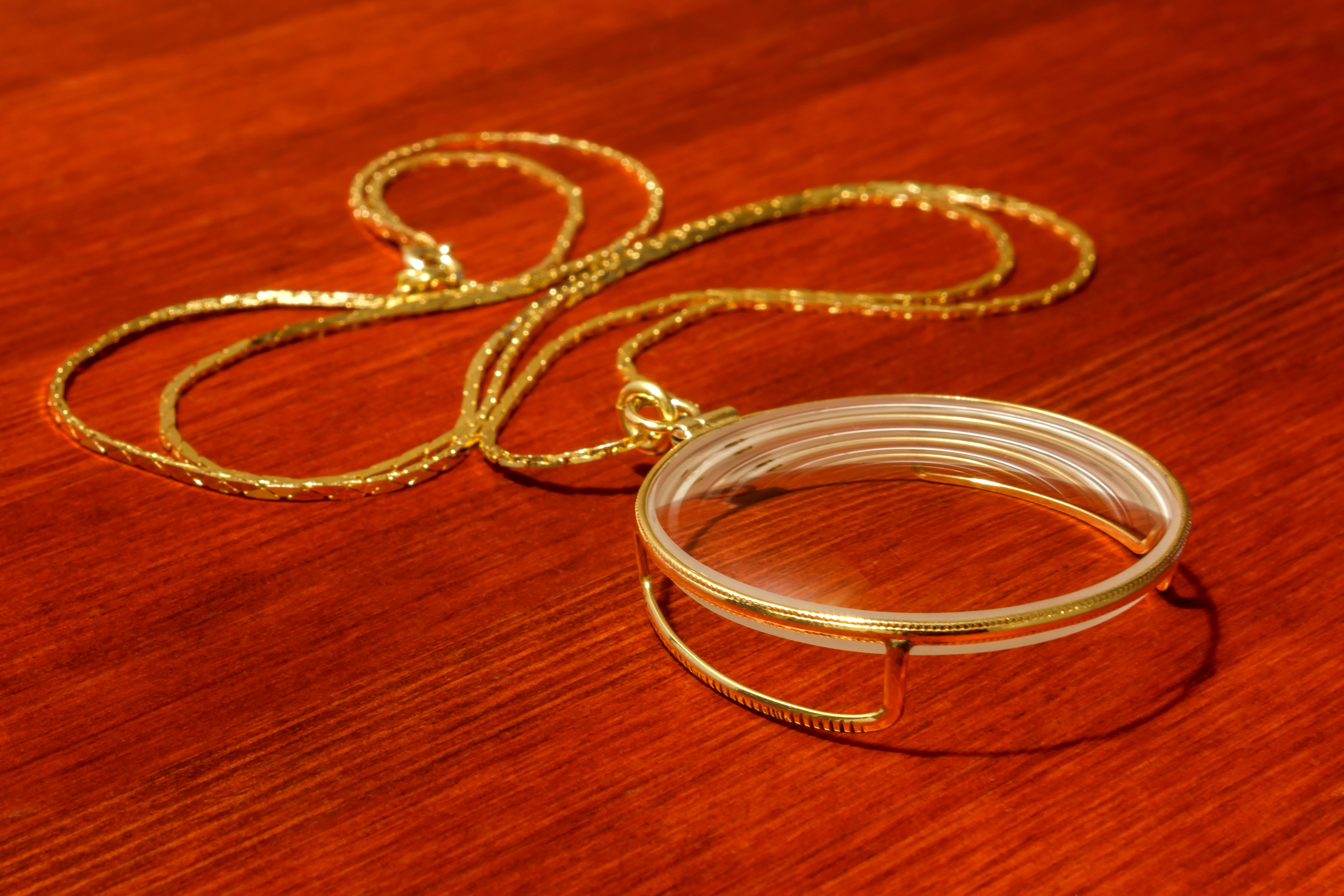
A 20th-century gold plated monocle with gallery

There are three additional styles of the monocle. The first style consists of a simple loop of metal with a lens that was slotted into the eye orbit. These were the first monocles worn in England and could be found from the 1830s onwards. The second style, which was developed in the 1890s, was the most elaborate, consisting of a frame with a raised edge-like extension known as the gallery. The gallery was designed to help secure the monocle in place by raising it out of the eye's orbit slightly so that the eyelashes would not jar it. Monocles with galleries were often the most expensive. The wealthy would have the frames custom-made to fit their eye sockets. A sub-category of the galleried monocle was the "sprung gallery", where the gallery was replaced by an incomplete circle of flattened, ridged wire supported by three posts. The ends were pulled together, the monocle was placed in the eye orbit, and the ends were released, causing the gallery to spring out and keep the monocle in place. The third style of monocle was frameless. This consisted of a cut piece of glass, with a serrated edge to provide a grip and sometimes a hole drilled into one side for a cord. Often the frameless monocle had no cord and would be worn freely. This style was popular at the beginning of the 20th century as the lens could be cut to fit any shape eye orbit inexpensively, without the cost of a customized frame.

If customized, monocles can be worn securely with little effort. However, periodic adjustment is common for monocle wearers to keep the monocle from popping. Often only the rich could afford to have a monocle custom-fabricated, while the poor had to settle for ill-fitting monocles that were less comfortable and less secure. In popular perception, a monocle could easily fall off with the wrong facial expression. A once-standard comedic device exploits this: an upper-class gentleman affects a shocked expression in response to some event, and his monocle falls into his drink or smashes to pieces on the floor.

== Wearers ==
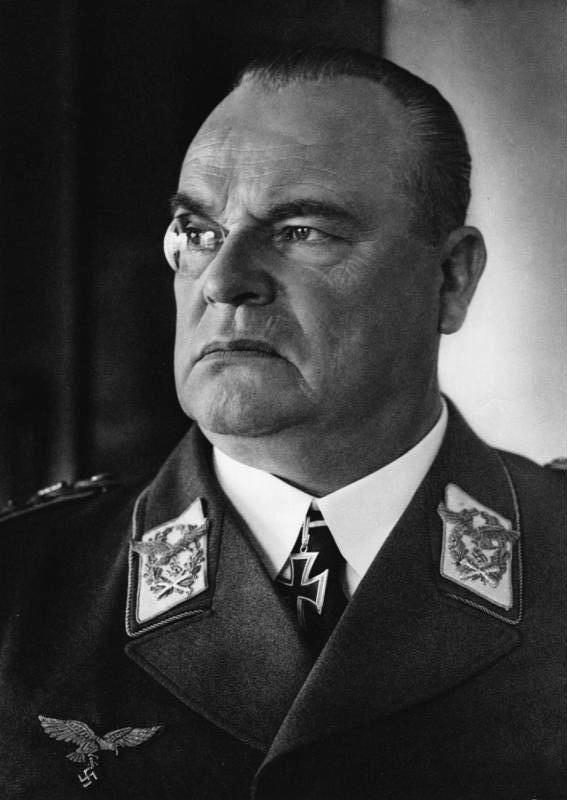
Generalfeldmarschall Hugo Sperrle wearing a monocle

During the late 19th and early 20th centuries, the monocle was generally associated with wealthy upper-class men. Combined with a morning coat and a top hat, the monocle completed the costume that is often stereotypically associated with an 1890s capitalist. Monocles were also accessories of German military officers from this period, especially from World War I and World War II. German military officers known to have worn a monocle include Helmuth Weidling, Hans Krebs, Werner von Fritsch, Erich Ludendorff, Walter Model, Walter von Reichenau, Dietrich von Saucken, Wilhelm Keitel, Dietrich von Choltiz, Hans von Seeckt, and Hugo Sperrle.

Following the Prussian example, monocles became fashionable among the officers of other peacetime European armies in the late 19th and early 20th centuries, especially in socially prestigious regiments such as those of the cavalry and guards. In an effort to curb what was seen as an unnecessary affectation, orders were sometimes issued limiting the wearing of monocles to individuals having a genuine optical need.

Monocles were most prevalent in the late 19th century, but are rarely worn today. This is due in large part to advances in optometry which allow for better measurement of refractive error, so that glasses and contact lenses can be prescribed with different strengths in each eye.

The monocle did, however, gain a following in the stylish lesbian circles of the early 20th century, when lesbians would wear a monocle for effect. Such women included Una Lady Troubridge, Radclyffe Hall, and Weimar German reporter Sylvia von Harden; the painting Portrait of the Journalist Sylvia Von Harden by German expressionist painter Otto Dix depicts its subject wearing a monocle.

Monocle wearers have included British politicians Joseph Chamberlain, his son Austen, Henry Chaplin, and Angus Maude. Percy Toplis (The Monocled Mutineer), Astronomer and The Sky at Night presenter Sir Patrick Moore, founder of Pakistan Mohammad Ali Jinnah, Portuguese President António de Spínola, filmmakers Fritz Lang and Erich von Stroheim, 19th-century Portuguese writer Eça de Queiroz, Soviet writer Mikhail Bulgakov, actor Conrad Veidt, Dadaists Tristan Tzara and Raoul Hausmann, esoteric-fascist Julius Evola, French collaborationist politician Louis Darquier de Pellepoix, Poet laureate Alfred Lord Tennyson, singer Richard Tauber, diplomat Christopher Ewart-Biggs (a smoked-glass monocle, to disguise his glass eye), Major Johnnie Cradock, actors Ralph Lynn, George Arliss and Martyn Green, and Karl Marx. In another vein, G. E. M. Anscombe was one of only a few noted women who occasionally wore a monocle. Abstract expressionist painter Barnett Newman wore a monocle mainly for getting a closer look at artworks. Richard Tauber wore a monocle to mask a squint in one eye. The Irish poet William Butler Yeats wore them at times too. The English author Evelyn Waugh used a monocle when he was in the Army during World War II and needed to focus his vision using a rifle at a shooting range during his initial training. Future British Conservative Party politician Jacob Rees-Mogg wore a monocle when interviewed by the BBC in 1981, aged 12.

=== In popular culture ===
Notable examples of fictional characters wearing a monocle include Colonel Klink from Hogan's Heroes, Batman antagonist the Penguin, Count von Count from the children's program Sesame Street, The Doctor, played by William Hartnell, Fearless Leader from Rocky and Bullwinkle and Veronica Sawyer, portrayed by Winona Ryder in Heathers, and Mr. Peanut, the Planters mascot. The monocle was also included in the design of the mascot for The New Yorker, Eustace Tilley, an early 19th-century dandy who uses his monocle like a quizzing glass.

== See also ==
- Contact lens
- Glasses, traditional lens
- Lorgnette, glasses that are held with a side-handle
- Monocular, a small hand-held magnifying telescope
- Pince-nez, glasses that grip the bridge of the nose
