= John Bellany =

Scottish painter (1942–2013)

"Allegory" (1964), oil on board

"Time and the Raven", oil on canvas

"Self-Portrait", from The Addenbrookes Hospital Series (1988)

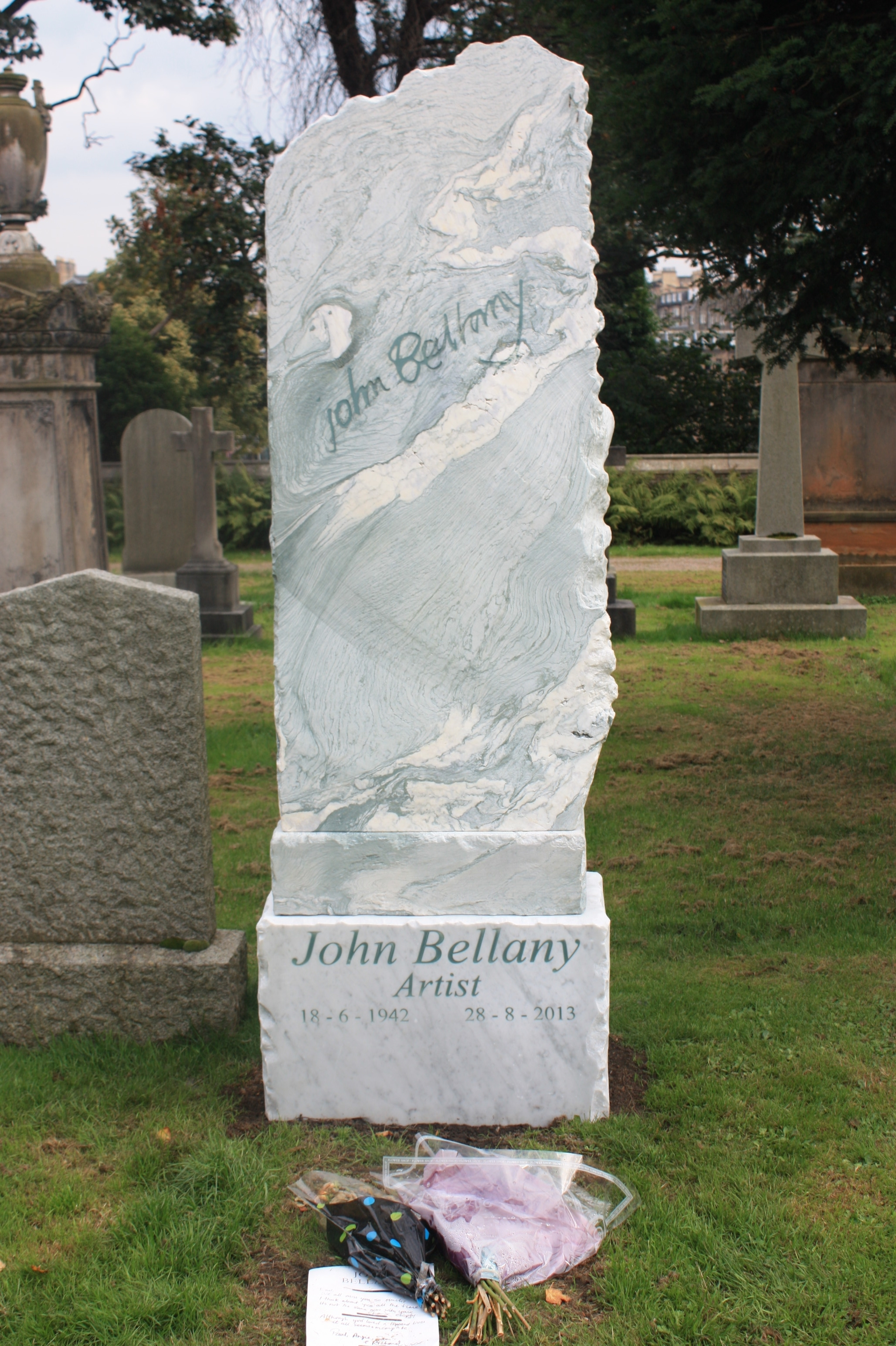
Bellany's grave, Dean Cemetery, Edinburgh

John Bellany CBE RA (18 June 1942 – 28 August 2013) was a Scottish painter.

== Early life ==
Bellany was born in Port Seton. His father and grandfather were fishermen in Port Seton and Eyemouth near Edinburgh.

During the early 1960s, he studied at Edinburgh College of Art, here he met with other young Scottish artists to begin lifelong friendships and share ideals for a renaissance in Scottish arts. His contemporaries included Alan Bold and Alexander Moffat. Bellany and Moffat studied under Robin Philipson. Their initial interest was in impressionism but with their common Scottish background they looked toward Alan Davie as a connection to a greater but more accessible artistic world.

After his studies at Edinburgh, Bellany achieved a major travelling scholarship and travelled around Europe discovering how the traditions of the great northern European masters could be connected to his own Scottish experience. After this he would marry Helen Percy and move to attend the Royal College of Art in London.

In 1967 he was invited to a trip to East Germany. In Dresden he viewed Otto Dix's War Triptych.

== Career ==
In 1968 Bellany graduated and his diploma show was hailed as great success. Many of the paintings from this and the earlier periods are now in public institutions as well as various national galleries. After graduation, Bellany was offered a teaching position at the Edinburgh College of Art but he carried on as a working artist, taking teaching jobs at Brighton College of Art and then Winchester College of Art.

He was elected to The London Group in 1973.

After he separated from his wife in 1974, his art appears to take on a darker tone. The symbolism increases and it seems as though each picture can have a whole narrative of symbols within it, increasingly the pictures become wilder, tending more to expressionism. He suffered a nervous breakdown and returned to Port Seton for recuperation.

Between 1973 and 1978 Bellany had been head of faculty of painting at Croydon College of Art and had met Juliet Lister who he later married. He lectured at Goldsmiths' College from 1978 to 1984.

In 1982 he was offered a show at the Rosa Esman Gallery in New York which presented his work to a greater audience, resulting in purchases to important private collections as well as to the Museum of Modern Art. One of the works exhibited was "Time and the Raven", a particularly strident work. The work's title was borrowed by his friend Sir Peter Maxwell Davies for his UN composition of the same name in 1995.

In 1984, following an impromptu holiday in France with his first wife and family he was diagnosed with liver disease, a consequence of his alcoholism. He abstained for the rest of his life but the damage had been done.

In 1985 his father died and his second wife Juliet committed suicide. A retrospective was arranged for the National Gallery of Modern Art. The exhibition at the National Portrait Gallery included a portrait of the cricketer Ian Botham. This portrait attracted more publicity for Bellany than he had previously achieved.

In 1986, he remarried his first wife Helen. The liver disease was becoming unmanageable. In 1988 Bellany was operated on for a then relatively new liver transplant procedure; this also inspired works. Carried out at Addenbrooke's Hospital in Cambridge by Roy Calne, Bellany not only survived but started to paint within hours of the operation, first producing a portrait of the nurse caring for him, then going on to produce a set of pictures known as the Addenbrooke's series.

Bellany received an Honorary Doctorate from Heriot-Watt University in 1998.

In 2003 Damien Hirst came out as an admirer of Bellany and bought several of his works as well as praising him as one of the major painters of the twentieth century.

In 2005 he suffered a heart attack. He died in 2013.

In 2017, Fortnum & Mason in collaboration with art collector Frank Cohen presented an exhibition of work in partnership with The Bellany Estate. The show called Fortnum's X Frank 2017 saw 50 works by Bellany scattered through Fortnum & Mason's London store. Curated by Robert Upstone, former Director of The Fine Art Society and Head of Modern British Art at Tate, the exhibition featured paintings from all periods of Bellany's career, and was the largest exhibition of the artist's work since his death in 2013.

== Legacy ==
Bellany's work is included in the Museum of Modern Art, New York, the Metropolitan Museum, New York, the Yale Center for British Art, New Haven, Connecticut and Tate Britain, London. Another place where his work is featured is the National Portrait galleries. Additionally some of his works are held in Scotland by the National Galleries of Scotland and also by East Lothian Council reflecting his generosity to the local communities he lived in.

He is buried on the south side of the main entrance path in Dean Cemetery on the west side of Edinburgh.

The National Gallery of Scotland held a major exhibition of his work, "John Bellany: A Passion for Life", shortly after his death, November 2012 – January 2013.

== Notable public works ==
see

- Allegory, National Gallery of Scotland (1964)
- Bethel, Southampton City art Gallery (1967)
- Celtic Feast, Sheffield Museums (1974)
- Billy Connolly, National Gallery of Scotland
- Ian Botham, cricketer, National Portrait Gallery, London (1985)
- Chinatown, London Transport Museum (1987)
