= The Painter Otto Dix and His Wife, Martha =

Photograph by August Sander

The Painter Otto Dix and His Wife, Martha (1925-26)

The Painter Otto Dix and His Wife, Martha is a black and white photograph taken by August Sander in 1925–1926. It was included in his project People of the 20th Century, released posthumously.

== Description ==
The photograph depicts the painter Otto Dix and his wife Martha Dix seated, with a white background. The portrait of the couple shows them gazing in different directions. Otto, at the right, appears in profile, looking to his wife, with a passive expression. Martha, who wears a bob hairstyle, typical of the 1920s, also appears emotionless, but looks directly at the viewer. This kind of double portrait seems influenced by the austerity and realism of the New Objectivity portraits. The way that Otto Dix is portrayed also recalls some of his self-portraits. Sander himself was influenced by several painters of that time for the work he did back then. He stated in 1927 that his purpose was "to see things as they are and not as they should or might be ... to tell the truth about our age and people."

== Public collections ==
There are prints of this photograph at several public collections, including the Städel Museum, in Frankfurt am Main, the Museum of Modern Art, in New York, the International Center of Photography, in New York, The Art Institute of Chicago, the Museum of Contemporary Photography, in Chicago, the Princeton University Art Museum, in Princeton, the Philadelphia Museum of Art, and the Cleveland Museum of Art.
