= Sylvia von Harden =

German journalist (1894–1963)

- Otto Dix's Portrait of the Journalist Sylvia von Harden (1926)
- Born: Sylvia von Halle; March 28, 1894; Hamburg, German Empire
- Died: June 4, 1963 (aged 69); Croxley Green, United Kingdom
- Other name: Sylvia von Halle
- Children: 1

Sylvia von Harden (March 28, 1894 – June 4, 1963), also called Sylvia von Halle, was a German journalist and poet. During her career as a journalist, she wrote for many newspapers in Germany and England. She is perhaps best known as the subject of a painting by Otto Dix.

== Life ==
Born Sylvia von Halle in Hamburg, von Harden (she chose the name as an aristocratic pseudonym) wrote a literary column for the monthly Das junge Deutschland ("The young Germany") from 1918 to 1920, and wrote for Die Rote Erde ("The red Earth") from 1919 to 1923. From 1919 to 1923, she lived with the writer Ferdinand Hardekopf, with whom she had a son. During the 1920s she lived in Berlin, and published two volumes of poetry in 1920 and 1927.

She was famously portrayed in Otto Dix's painting entitled "Bildnis der Journalistin Sylvia von Harden" (Portrait of the Journalist Sylvia von Harden, 1926). An ambivalent image of the New Woman, it depicts von Harden with bobbed hair and monocle, seated at a cafe table with a cigarette in her hand and a cocktail in front of her. This painting is recreated in the opening and closing scenes of the 1972 film Cabaret.

Snippet from the closing scene of Cabaret.

In 1959, von Harden wrote an article, "Erinnerungen an Otto Dix" ("Memories of Otto Dix"), in which she described the genesis of the portrait. Dix had met her on the street, and declared:

'I must paint you! I simply must! ... You are representative of an entire epoch!'
'So, you want to paint my lacklustre eyes, my ornate ears, my long nose, my thin lips; you want to paint my long hands, my short legs, my big feet—things which can only scare people off and delight no-one?'
'You have brilliantly characterized yourself, and all that will lead to a portrait representative of an epoch concerned not with the outward beauty of a woman but rather with her psychological condition.'

The painting, an important example of the New Objectivity movement, is now in the Musée National d'Art Moderne, Centre Georges Pompidou, Paris.

In 1933, von Harden left Germany for self-exile in England, where she continued to write but with less success. In an article she wrote for the refugee newspaper Die Zeitung in April 1943, she described "her shift work in a factory and, in the exalted tones that were common in wartime publications of the sort, claimed to have been made to feel part of the family there". She died in Croxley Green, England, in 1963.

== Works ==
- (with Leo Scherpenbach): Die Bücherkiste: Monatsschrift für Literatur, Graphik und Buchbesprechung. Munich: Bachmair 1919-1921 (Reprinted: Nendeln/Liechtenstein: Kraus 1977)
- Verworrene Städte (1920)
- Robespierre: Eine Novelle. (ca. 1924)
- Die italienische Gondel: Gedichte (1927)
- Das Leuchtturmmädchen von Longstone. 1958 (Jugendbuchreihe Silberstern Nr. 74)
