= Hugo Erfurth with Dog =

1926 painting by Otto Dix

- Artist: Otto Dix
- Year: 1926
- Medium: Tempera and oil on panel
- Dimensions: 80 cm × 100 cm (31 in × 39 in)
- Location: Thyssen-Bornemisza Museum, Madrid

Hugo Erfurth with Dog is a painting in tempera and oil on panel executed by the German painter Otto Dix in 1926. It depicts his personal friend, the photographer Hugo Erfurth, who also would take several pictures of the artist. The portrait is part of the collection of the Thyssen-Bornemisza Museum, in Madrid.

== Description and analysis ==
This painting shows the influence of German Renaissance masters such as Lucas Cranach the Elder and Hans Baldung Grien, as Dix had adopted the painstaking technique of tempera and oil on panel, rather than on canvas. He had a particular interest by portraiture, since it had a major tradition in German painting.

The current portrait was made after Dix's return from Berlin to Dresden, where he was nominated teacher at the Staatliche Akademie der Bildenden Künste, in 1926. He had already executed a portrait of Hugo Erfurth the previous year. This time Dix chose to present his friend in a depiction heavily influenced by the German tradition, but still with a very contemporary touch. Erfurth is presented at half length, dressed in the fashionable clothing he preferred, seen in profile, looking to his left, and with his large German Shepherd dog, Ajax, in front of him. The dog appears also in profile, looking to his front, with pointed ears, and his mouth open with a large protruding tongue. Behind them, there is a heavy brown curtain and a vivid blue background to their left.

The portrait represents a more realistic style than other depictions by Dix of figures from the Weimar Republic era, such as the Portrait of the Journalist Sylvia von Harden from the same year.
