= To Beauty =

Painting by Otto Dix

- An die Schönheit (German)
- Artist: Otto Dix
- Year: 1922
- Medium: Oil on canvas
- Movement: New Objectivity
- Dimensions: 139.5 cm × 120.5 cm (54.9 in × 47.4 in)
- Location: Von der Heydt Museum, Wuppertal

To Beauty is an oil-and-collage-on-canvas painting executed in 1922 by German painter Otto Dix. It is signed and dated at the lower right. It is held at the Von der Heydt Museum, in Wuppertal.

== History and description ==
This painting is part of the work that Dix created inspired by the reality of the Weimar Republic, in the period after World War I. In this case, Dix presents a scene that takes place in a nightclub, with two Ionic columns, where he appears himself at the center foreground, and where are visible several people, presumably customers and those who worked there, including, at the right, an African-American drummer for a jazz band.

Dix presents himself dressed as a businessman, in a dapper suit of the latest fashion, while looking directly at the viewer, with an expressionless face, while clutching a modern-style telephone. The artist is most likely presenting himself in the role of a businessman engaged in some kind of business, in the difficult times of inflation of the first years of the Weimar era.

The character at the right immediately attracts the viewers' attention, as the black drummer of a jazz band, of which he is the only one depicted. He is clearly African American and wears a kerchief in his jacket pocket with the "stars and stripes" of his country's flag, and his drum is decorated with the image of a Native American chief, in profile. He smiles, with a menacing expression, and brandishes his drumstick. His black features are exaggerated, bordering in caricature, and his portrait was most likely inspired by a photograph. Black people were rare by then in Germany, while Jazz was just becoming popular. Only after 1925, African-American Jazz bands became more usual there. The presence of the African-American Jazz drummer seems to indicate the growing influence of the United States in Germany's cultural and social life. At the lower left, a wax bust of a women, with an ancient hairstyle, similar to those used as advertisements for hairdressers before the World War I, looks smiling to the viewer.

A fashionable couple appears dancing at the left, possibly they are professional dancers who worked for the nightclub. Dix himself was an avid ragtime dancer, like his first wife, Martha Dix, and even thought of becoming a professional one, with her as a pair, at the time. At the right background, a woman, scantily dressed, in a corset, dances alone. She is possibly a prostitute who also works for the nightclub. Behind her, in the dark background, a waiter passes by.

The title of the painting is meant to be ironic, in contrast with the reality it depicts, and it might have been inspired by a Max Klinger cycle of engravings, called Vom Tode II (1898), which included the print An die Schöneit, in English, To Beauty.
