= Prague Street =

Painting by Otto Dix

- Pragerstraße (German)
- Artist: Otto Dix
- Year: 1920
- Medium: Oil and collage on canvas
- Dimensions: 100 cm × 80 cm (39 in × 31 in)
- Location: Kunstmuseum, Stuttgart

Prague Street (German: Pragerstraße) is an oil-and-collage-on-canvas painting by the German painter Otto Dix, executed in 1920, which depicts the Prager Straße in Dresden, shortly after the First World War. It is held at the Kunstmuseum Stuttgart, formerly known as Galerie der Stadt.

== Description ==
The painting was executed in July 1920, after Dix had participated in the First World War. The canvas depicts two war cripples. In the foreground, the character seems to be from the middle or upper class, but has no legs and moves with the help of a skateboard and canes. He wears a bowler hat and a nice jacket with a medal pinned on it. Under his skateboard there is a leaflet, the title of which can be clearly read: “Juden raus!", or Jews out!. In the background, the character wears a hat, has a beard and is poorly dressed, while he has only one valid arm. He is a beggar and asks for alms. Also in the background, a little girl draws with chalk on the edge of a prosthetist's window. The back of a woman who passes by the scene, with one of her high heels visible, is seen at the right.
