= The Skat Players =

Painting by Otto Dix

- Die Skatspieler (German)
- Artist: Otto Dix
- Year: 1920
- Medium: Oil and collage on canvas
- Dimensions: 110 cm × 87 cm (43 in × 34 in)
- Location: Neue Nationalgalerie, Berlin

The Skat Players (German: Die Skatspieler), later titled Card-Playing War Cripples (German: Kartenspielende Kriegskrüppel), is an oil-and-collage-on-canvas painting executed by Otto Dix in 1920. It depicts disabled veterans of the First World War playing a card game. It is held at the Neue Nationalgalerie in Berlin. He also had the later title of Kartenspielende Kriegskrüppel (War cripples playing cards). It was one of the first works of the artist in the style of New Objectivity.

== History and description ==
The painting represents three mutilated veterans of the First World War playing a card game named skat, very popular in Germany. It is part of a series of four paintings inspired by the post-World War I atmosphere executed in 1920: The Street in Prague, The Match Seller, The Skat Players and The Barricade.

After the war, there were 2,700,000 wounded German soldiers, including 800,000 disabled in some way. Dix had seen three war veterans, horribly mutilated, playing cards in the back room of a Dresden cafe. He immediately made a preparatory drawing of the scene. The final painting is rather morbid, since he further accentuated the horrific character of the scene: for example, he removed the two leg stumps of the character on the right of which only the torso remains, dressed in a blue jacket from which the penis protrudes. One of the players holds his cards in his mouth, the second with his toes, and the other with a mechanical hand. Part of the head of the player on the left is burnt, and his left leg was replaced by a stick.

The player on the right has a mechanical lower jaw, formed by a fragment of a cigarette pack where Dix wrote jokingly "Unterkiefer: Prothese Mark: Dix", which means "lower jaw prosthesis, mark Dix", and is surrounded by a photo of himself who reads “Nur echt mit dem Bild des Erfinders”, meaning "only valid with the portrait of the inventor". Behind the three players, three newspapers are suspended: the Dresdner Anzeiger, the Dresdner Neueste Nachrichten, and the Berliner Tageblatt. Inside the lamp, there is a skull.

== Provenance ==
The painting would have been considered degenerate art by the Nazi regimen, so it was hidden by a friend. It survived the bombing of Dresden in February 1945. After World War II, a collector bought it in 1959 and lent it to the Galerie der Stadt in Stuttgart. His heirs sold it in 1995 to the Nationalgalerie in Berlin, which appealed for donations in order to acquire it.
