= Secretary at West German Radio, Cologne =

Photograph by August Sander

Secretary at West German Radio, Cologne is a black and white photograph taken by August Sander in 1931. It was part of his project Menschen des 20. Jahrhunderts, documenting the different social classes and occupations of the people of Germany.

== Description ==
The photograph depicts a young woman working at a radio station in Cologne in 1931, during the last years of the Weimar Republic. The woman is quietly seated in a chair, while she looks confindently at the viewer, holding a cigarette near her mouth with her right hand, which she appears to be smoking. She wears a fashionable silk flowery dress and has a very short hairstyle, typical of the "new woman" of the Weimar Republic, which adds to her androgynous look. The woman represents the emancipated woman of her time, capable of working for a living.

On the same occasion, Sander took a similar photograph of the sitter. In this version, the woman is still seated, legs crossed, and looks directly to the viewer, seemingly more relaxed, holding her left hand on her right arm, which holds the cigarette.

The picture has similarities with the Portrait of the Journalist Sylvia von Harden (1928), by the painter Otto Dix, which might have served as an inspiration. Both are products of the New Objectivity artistic movement.

== Public collections ==
There are prints of this photograph at the August Sander Archive, in Cologne, the Moderna Museet, in Stockholm, the Museum of Modern Art, in New York, and the National Gallery of Canada, in Ottawa.
