= The Art Dealer Alfred Flechtheim =

1926 painting by Otto Dix

- Bildnis des Kunsthändlers Alfred Flechtheim (German)
- Artist: Otto Dix
- Year: 1926
- Medium: Oil on panel
- Movement: New Objectivity
- Dimensions: 120 cm × 80 cm (47 in × 31 in)
- Location: Neue Nationalgalerie, Berlin

The Art Dealer Alfred Flechtheim (German: Bildnis des Kunsthändlers Alfred Flechtheim) is a 1926 oil painting by the German artist Otto Dix. It portrays the German Jewish art dealer and collector Alfred Flechtheim. It was obtained by Berlin's National Gallery in 1961 and is held at the Neue Nationalgalerie.

An unflattering portrait, it may have been influenced by Flechtheim's description of Dix as someone who can only "paint farts". Due to its element of caricature, including an exaggerated nose and compressed forehead, it is one of few modernist paintings from the Weimar Republic that have been discussed as possibly referencing antisemitic views. The art historian Rose-Carol Washton Long compares it to a drawing George Grosz made of Flechtheim in 1928 and argues that both depictions reflect how the artists "absorbed many of the negative attitudes toward Jews that were commonplace expressions and beliefs in Germany between the wars, not among the nationalists and the right-wing but among the center and the Left".
