= Stormtroopers Advance Under a Gas Attack =

Engraving by Otto Dix

Stormtroopers Advance Under a Gas Attack

Stormtroopers Advance Under a Gas Attack (German: Sturmtruppe geht unter Gas vor) is an engraving in aquatint by the German painter and printmaker Otto Dix representing German soldiers in combat during the First World War. It is the twelfth in the series of fifty engravings entitled The War, published in 1924. Copies are kept at the German Historical Museum in Berlin, at the Museum of Modern Art in New York, and at the Minneapolis Institute of Art, among other public collections.

== Description ==
The engraving is almost monochrome, rectangular in format (19.3 × 28.8 cm for the engraving, 34.8 × 47.3 cm for the sheet). The engraving represents five German stormtroopers, recognizable by their steel helmets, all wearing gas masks, as they are advancing into enemy lines, while suffering a gas attack.
