= The War (Dix engravings) =

Etchings by Otto Dix portraying war

Otto Dix, Sturmtruppe geht unter Gas vor ("Stormtroopers Advance Under a Gas Attack"), 1924

The War (German: Der Krieg) is a series of 50 drypoint and aquatint etchings by German artist Otto Dix, catalogued by Florian Karsch as K.70 to K.119. The prints were published in Berlin in 1924 by Karl Nierendorf, in an edition which included separate high quality folio prints, and a lower-quality version with 24 prints bound together. It is often compared to Francisco Goya's series of 82 engravings The Disasters of War. The British Museum, which holds a complete set of the folio prints, has described the series as "Dix's central achievement as a graphic artist"; the auction house Christie's has described it as "one of the finest and most unflinching depictions of war in western art".

== Background ==
Dix was born in 1891, and studied art in Dresden before the First World War. He was conscripted in 1915, and served in the Imperial German Army as a machine gunner on both the Eastern Front and the Western Front. After the war, he returned to study at the Dresden Academy of Fine Arts, and then in Italy. He was a founder of the short-lived avant-garde Dresdner Sezession art group, and then supported the post-expressionist New Objectivity movement.

His horrific experiences in the trenches inspired the anti-war art he created after 1920. Dix came to public attention when featured by Theodor Däubler in Das Kunstblatt in 1920. In 1921, Otto Dix met Karl Nierendorf, an art dealer in Berlin, who became his agent and publisher. Dix's large anti-war painting The Trench ("Der Schützengraben") caused great controversy when first exhibited in Cologne in 1923. It was confiscated as degenerate art (Entartete Kunst) by the Nazis, and lost during the Second World War.

Dix's reputation for controversy continued in 1925, when he successfully defended himself against charges of indecency following exhibitions in Berlin and Darmstadt of two paintings of prostitutes. He became a professor at the Dresden Academy in 1927, and returned to anti-war sentiments for his 1929 to 1932 triptych, also entitled The War (Der Krieg), the central panel of which reworks themes from The Trench: this painting been held by the Galerie Neue Meister in Dresden since 1968.

== Description ==
Dix's War prints were published in 1924, the tenth anniversary of the outbreak of the war, as an antidote to the heroic interpretation of the war. Dix had seen Goya's series of 82 engravings The Disasters of War in Basel: he was inspired by Goya's etching technique that combined etching and aquatint to depict horrific scenes from the Napoleonic Wars in Spain, and created a similar series of etchings of atrocities from the First World War.

Among the other influences on Dix's prints were the works of Urs Graf, Jacques Callot's Miseries of War print series, and Goya's painting The Third of May 1808. Some of the scenes also draw inspiration from preparatory sketches for his 1923 painting The Trench, and others from a visit to the catacombs in Palermo in 1923–24, and the wartime photographs of Ernst Friedrich, published as Krieg dem Kriege ("War against War") in 1924.

Dix studied with Wilhelm Herberholz in Düsseldorf to improve his etching prowess before embarking on the prints.

In the series, Dix depicts scenes of executions and famine, with trenches and corpses amid the desolate landscapes in Flanders and the Somme. He shows images of emaciated and decaying corpses, grimacing skeletons, bodies crucified or impaled on barbed wire, the wounded with bulging eyes and open flesh, in a hallucinatory dance macabre. The prints are based on wartime photographs, hundreds of sketches that Dix made during the war, and his own memories.

Ten of the prints highlight the disproportionate burdens borne by soldiers in different branches of the armed forces: the infantrymen are mutilated, wounded, suffer, go mad and die, while sailors binge with prostitutes. One his prints, Soldat und Nonne ("Soldier and nun", K.120) – a graphic image of a soldier attempting to rape a nun – was withdrawn from the series before it was published, but another Soldat und Hure ("Soldier and whore", K.105) was included under the title Besuch bei Madame Germaine in Méricourt ("Visit to Madame Germaine's in Méricourt").

The etchings measure approximately 22 by 23 centimetres (8.7 in × 9.1 in), printed on cream-coloured paper approximately 39.8 by 42.1 centimetres (15.7 in × 16.6 in). The series was published in Berlin by Karl Nierendorf, as a folio of fifty engravings, in five portfolios of ten etchings each, entitled Der Krieg ("The War"). Dix gave each engraving a title, location, and description, and they were arranged into sets of ten without taking into account any chronological or temporal order, or the order in which the plates were made. They were printed by Otto Felsing in an edition of 70, with the portfolios priced at 300 Reichsmarks each, or all five for 1000 Marks. Nierendorf also published a book containing with an introduction by the author Henri Barbusse, in an edition of 10,000 priced at just 1.20 Marks, later increased to 2.40 Marks.

== Reception ==
Nierendorf collaborated with the pacifist "Never Again War" (Nie wieder Krieg) organisation to circulate the prints throughout Germany. They were an instant critical and popular success, praised for their depiction of the horrific reality of modern warfare in the First World War, but also controversial. In the 1930s, many of Dix's works were condemned as degenerate art (Entartete Kunst) by the Nazi party. A complete set of Dix's War prints held by the Kupferstichkabinett Berlin was included in the Degenerate Art Exhibition in 1937.

Complete sets of the 50 folio prints are held by several public collections, including the Historial de la Grande Guerre in Péronne, the Kupferstichkabinett in the Kunsthalle Hamburg, the Museum of Modern Art in New York City, the National Gallery of Australia, and the British Museum. A complete set of 50 prints, formerly owned by Lothar-Günther Buchheim and deaccessioned as a duplicate from the Buchheim Museum, was sold by Christie's in 2017 for £236,750. A complete set with a copy of Soldat und Nonne was sold by Sotheby's in 2014 for US$377,000.

== List of etchings ==
(Using the titles given by Otto Dix)

Number	Title in German	English translation
I.1	Soldatengrab zwischen den Linien	Soldiers' Grave Between the Lines
I.2	Verschuttete – Januar 1916, Champagne	Buried Alive – January 1916, Champagne
I.3	Gastote – Templeux-la-Fosse, August 1916	Gas Victims – Templeux-la-Fosse, August 1916
I.4	Trichterfeld bei Dontrien, von Leuchtkugeln erhellt	Crater Field near Dontrien, Lit by Flares
I.5	Pferdekadaver	Horse Cadaver
I.6	Verwundeter – Herbst 1916, Bapaume	Wounded Man – Autumn 1916, Bapaume
I.7	Bei Langemarck – Februar 1918	Near Langemarck – February 1918
I.8	Relaisposten – Herbstschlacht in der Champagne	Relay Post – Autumn Battle in Champagne
I.9	Zerfallender Kampfgraben	Collapsed Trenches
I.10	Fliehender Verwundeter – Sommeschlacht 1916	Wounded Man Fleeing – Battle of the Somme, 1916
II.1	Verlassene Stellung bei Neuville	Abandoned Position near Neuville (Note: There are many places in France called Neuville, and several of them are in or near the area of fighting. It may be impossible to determine which one this was.)
II.2	Sturmtruppe geht unter Gas vor	Stormtroopers Advance under a Gas Attack
II.3	Mahlzeit in der Sappe – Lorettohöhe	Mealtime in the Trench – Loretto Heights
II.4	Ruhende Kompanie	Resting Company
II.5	Verlassene Stellung bei Vis-en-Artois	Abandoned Position near Vis-en-Artois
II.6	Leiche im Drahtverhau – Flandern	Corpse in Barbed Wire – Flanders
II.7	Leuchtkugel erhellt die Monacu-ferme	Flare Illuminates the Monacu farm
II.8	Toter Sappenposten	Dead Sentry in the Trench
II.9	Totentanz anno 17 – Höhe Toter Mann	Dance of Death 1917 – Dead Man Heights
II.10	Die II. Kompanie wird heute Nacht abgelöst	The Second Company Will Be Relieved Tonight
III.1	Abgekämpfte Truppe geht zurück – Sommeschlacht	Battle-Weary Troops Retreat – Battle of the Somme
III.2	Nächtliche Begegnung mit einem Irrsinnigen	Nocturnal Encounter with a Lunatic
III.3	Toter im Schlamm	Dead Man in the Mud
III.4	Granattrichter mit Blumen – Frühling 1916	Shell Crater with Flowers – Spring 1916
III.5	Die Trümmer von Langemarck	The Ruins of Langemarck
III.6	Sterbender Soldat	Dying Soldier
III.7	Abend in der Wijtschaete-Ebene – November 1917	Evening on the Wijtschate Plain – November 1917
III.8	Gesehen am Steilhang von Cléry-sur-Somme	Seen on the Escarpment at Cléry-sur-Somme
III.9	Gefunden beim Grabendurchstich – Auberive	Found While Digging a Trench – Aubérive
III.10	Drahtverhau vor dem Kampfgraben	Tangled Barbed Wire before the Trench
IV.1	Schädel	Skull
IV.2	Matrosen in Antwerpen	Sailors in Antwerp
IV.3	Lens wird mit Bomben belegt	Lens Being Bombed
IV.4	Frontsoldat in Brüssel	Front-line Soldier in Brussels
IV.5	Die Irrsinnige von Sainte-Marie-à-Py	The Madwoman of Sainte-Marie-à-Py
IV.6	Besuch bei Madame Germaine in Méricourt	Visit to Madame Germaine's in Méricourt
IV.7	Kantine in Haplincourt	Canteen in Haplincourt
IV.8	Zerschossene	Shot to Pieces
IV.9	Durch Fliegerbomben zerstörtes Haus – Tournai	House Destroyed by Aerial Bombs – Tournai
IV.10	Transplantation	Skin Graft
V.1	Maschinengewehrzug geht vor – Somme, November 1916	Machine-Gun Squad Advances – Somme, November 1916
V.2	Toter – St. Clément	Dead Man – Saint-Clément (Note: There are many places in France called Saint-Clément, and several of them are in or near the area of fighting. It may be impossible to determine which one this was.)
V.3	Essenholer bei Pilkem	Ration Carrying near Pilkem
V.4	Überfall einer Schleichpatrouille	Surprise Attack
V.5	Unterstand	Foxhole
V.6	Die Schlafenden von Fort Vaux – Gas-Tote	The Sleepers of Fort Vaux – Gas Victims
V.7	Verwundetentransport im Houthulster Wald	Transporting the Wounded in Houthulst Forest
V.8	Die Sappenposten haben nacht das Feuer zu unterhalten	The Outposts in the Trenches Must Maintain the Bombardment at Night
V.9	Appell der Zurückgekehrten	Roll Call of Returning Troops
V.10	Tote vor der Stellung bei Tahure	Dead Men before the Position near Tahure
