= Felix Benjamin =

- Born: 26 January 1871; Berlin, German Empire
- Died: 3 April 1943 (aged 72); Theresienstadt Ghetto, Czechoslovakia
- Occupations: Industrialist, businessman
- Known for: Jewish industrialists whose enterprises contributed to Germany’s heavy industry before being destroyed by the Nazi regime
- Spouse: Ida Grünfeld (m. 1901)

Felix Benjamin (26 January 1871 – 3 April 1943) was a German Jewish industrialist, businessman and art collector. He served as General Director and chairman of the ore-import firm Rawack & Grünfeld and was a member of the supervisory board of the Lübecker Hochofenwerk. Benjamin was persecuted under the Nazi regime, deprived of his property, and deported to the Theresienstadt concentration camp, where he was murdered in 1943.

== Early life and career ==
Felix Benjamin was born in Berlin in 1871. On 26 February 1901 he married Ida Grünfeld in Kattowitz (Katowice), daughter of an ore-trading family. Benjamin became a partner and later general director of the ore importer Rawack & Grünfeld, a company that moved its headquarters from Beuthen (Bytom) in Silesia to Berlin around 1914–1915.

He also served as a shareholder and member of the supervisory board of the Lübecker Hochofenwerk, a company that was about ninety percent Jewish-owned. Under his direction, Rawack & Grünfeld became one of the largest ore and metal trading firms in pre-war Germany.

He owned artworks, including a portrait of himself by Max Liebermann.

== Nazi persecution ==
After the Nazi came to power in 1933, Benjamin was persecuted because he was Jewish and his firm was “Aryanised” (transferred to non-Jewish ownership under Nazi supervision). He lost his business and assets and lived as a subtenant in Berlin—first at Sächsische Straße 2 and later at Giesebrechtstraße 12 in Charlottenburg.

On 17 March 1943, Benjamin was deported from Berlin to the Theresienstadt Ghetto (Terezín) in occupied Czechoslovakia. He died there on 3 April 1943. His wife Ida Benjamin (née Grünfeld), who had been deported from Breslau, died later that year on 11 July 1943 after suffering a stroke.

== Post-war restitution ==
After the Second World War, parts of Benjamin’s former business holdings were absorbed into the Flick industrial conglomerate. According to post-war records, the Flick Group paid compensation to Benjamin’s family, thereby avoiding a full restitution lawsuit.

A Stolperstein (memorial stone) in front of his former residence at Giesebrechtstraße 12, Berlin-Charlottenburg, commemorates him and his wife.

In July 2023, the Von der Heydt Museum restituted “Portrait of Felix Benjamin” by Max Liebermann to the heirs of Felix Benjamin.

== Legacy ==
Felix Benjamin is remembered as part of the generation of Jewish industrialists whose enterprises contributed to Germany’s heavy industry before being destroyed by the Nazi regime. His story exemplifies the economic dispossession, deportation, and murder of Jewish business leaders during the Holocaust.
