= Portrait of the Dancer Anita Berber =

1925 painting by Otto Dix

- Artist: Otto Dix
- Year: 1925
- Medium: Oil and tempera on plywood
- Dimensions: 120 cm × 65 cm (47 in × 26 in)
- Location: Kunstmuseum Stuttgart, Stuttgart

The Portrait of the Dancer Anita Berber (German: Porträt der Tänzerin Anita Berber) is a 1925 painting in oil and tempera on plywood by the German artist Otto Dix. It represents the dancer Anita Berber, a celebrity of the Weimar Republic, known for her scandalous performances and licentious lifestyle. It belongs to the collection of the Sammlung Landesbank Baden-Württemberg, and is on loan to the Kunstmuseum Stuttgart, Germany.

== Description ==
Dix knew Anita Berber personally, having attended several of her live performances. Although Berber posed for this portrait in the nude, the artist decided to depict her wearing a long red dress, on a red background. The dress covers almost her entire body. She looks to her right, while striking a vamp-like pose, with her left hand in front and her right hand resting on her hip. Her hair is also red, and she wears very thick white makeup, which gives her face a mask-like appearance. Her depiction emphasizes her open sexuality and her status as a sexual icon of the time.

== Cultural references ==
The painting was part of the two stamps edition by Deutsche Post to commemorate the centennial of the birth of Otto Dix in 1991.
