= The Match Seller =

1920 painting by Otto Dix

- Streichholzhändler (German)
- Artist: Otto Dix
- Year: 1920
- Medium: Oil on canvas and collage
- Dimensions: 141.5 cm × 166 cm (55.7 in × 65 in)
- Location: Staatsgalerie Stuttgart, Stuttgart

The Match Seller (German: Streichholzhändler) is a 1920 oil painting with collage elements by the German Dada and Neue Sachlichkeit artist Otto Dix. Completed one year after the end of World War I (then known as the Great War), the composition depicts a crippled and homeless veteran match seller who is ostensibly ignored by bourgeois passersby on a street in Germany.

The painting has been interpreted as a critique the war's brutality and the neglect of veterans in German society, while alluding to the artist's disapproval of the Weimar Republic's societal and political decay. Dix incorporated collage in the Match Seller, a technique popularized by Dada artists, to diverge from traditional art forms. Similarly to other works by Dix, The Match Seller was labeled as "degenerate art" by the Nazi regime, which confiscated it sometime between 1937 and 1938. The painting is currently in the permanent collection of the Staatsgalerie Stuttgart in Stuttgart, Germany.

== Analysis ==
=== Description ===
The composition depicts a scene where a crippled war veteran is seen selling matches on a street in Germany. Several well-dressed passersby flee from the blind amputee, while a dachshund urinates on the veteran's peglegs. As others ignore him, the veteran cries out the phrase "Matches, original Swedish matches!" (German: "Streichhölzer, Echte Schwedenhölzer") written on the composition using white lettering.

=== Scholarship ===
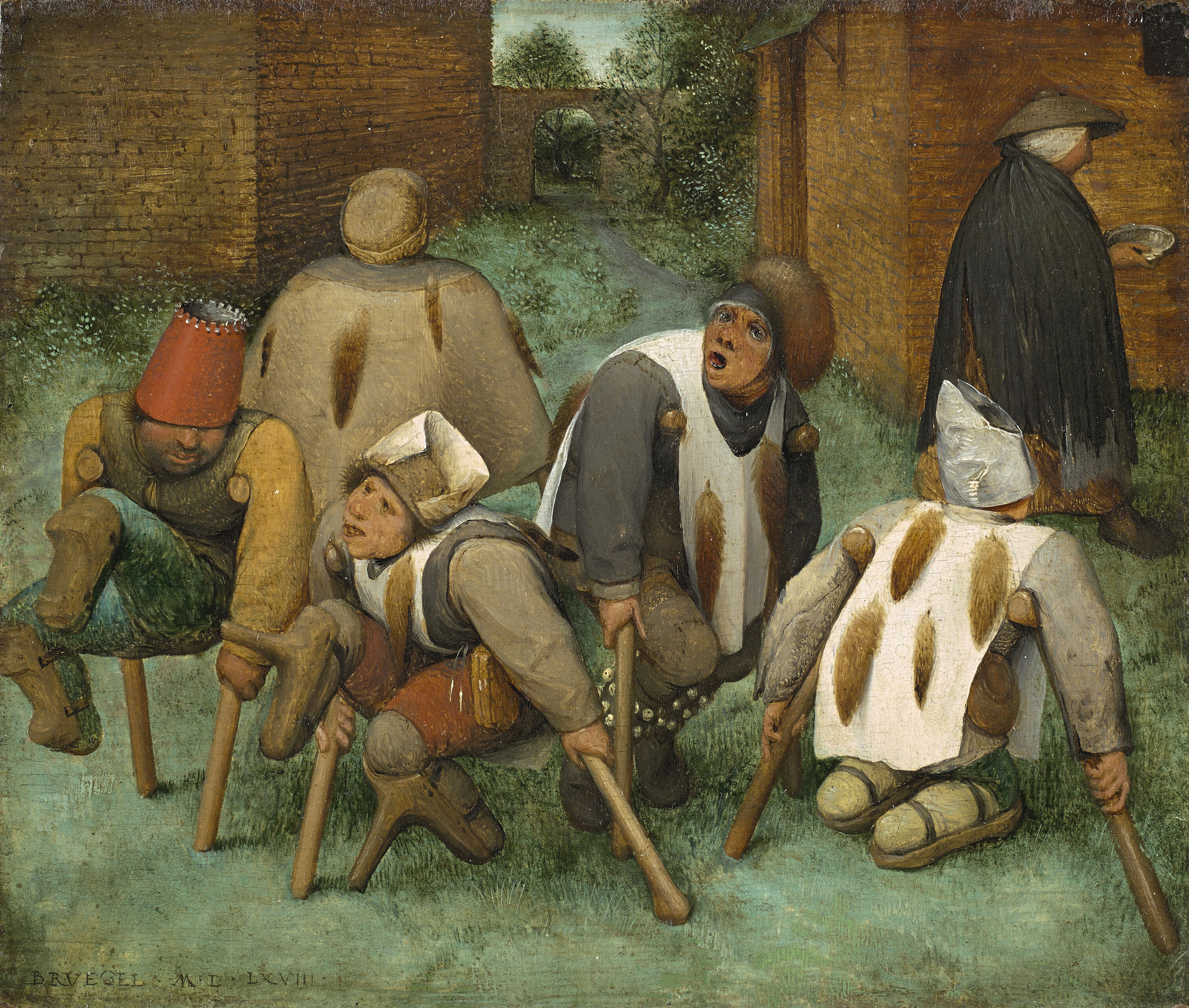
Peter Brueghel the Elder, The Beggars, oil on canvas, 1568 (Louvre, Paris)

According to art historian and curator Sabine Rewald, what set Dix apart from other painters associated with the Neue Sachlichkeit movement was his "fascination with the 'ugly'". Painted one year after the end of World War I and the Treaty of Versailles, The Match Seller is one of four "pictures of cripples" Dix completed while in Dresden to protest the brutality of the war and the lack of respect for the veterans among the contemporary German society. Otto Dix was a veteran himself, having served in a machine gun unit on the Western Front of World War I as a non-commissioned officer, and the experience of the war and its brutality deeply affected the artist.

Moreover, the composition has also been interpreted as the artist's political critique of the Weimar Republic, including the demoralization of its post-war society and the economic inequality that would contribute to the subsequent rise of the National Socialist government. Dix's depiction of the veteran as a "dehumanized outcast" has been compared to The Beggars, a 1568 painting completed by the Netherlandish Renaissance artist Pieter Bruegel the Elder. Along with many other works by Dix, The Match Seller was included on the list of works of degenerate art in Nazi Germany and confiscated between 1937 and 1938.

=== Technique ===
Dix's 1920 composition includes collage, a technique invented by the Cubists that became popular among the artists associated with the Dada movement in Germany, including Hannah Höch and Kurt Schwitters. The use of collage allowed artists to shift away from traditional forms of artmaking in favor of more modern and unorthodox materials. Dix began using collage in late 1919. He also incorporated this technique into Prague Street, another painting completed in 1920.
