= The Trench (Dix) =

Painting by Otto Dix

- Artist: Otto Dix
- Year: 1920–1923
- Medium: Oil on canvas
- Dimensions: 227 cm × 250 cm (89 in × 98 in)
- Location: Dresden City Museum, Dresden (lost)

The Trench (German: Der Schützengraben), but earlier known as The War Picture or simply Der Krieg ("The War"), was an oil painting by the German artist Otto Dix. The large painting was made from 1920 to 1923, and was one of the several anti-war works by Dix in the 1920s, inspired by his experience of trench warfare in the First World War.

The painting was immediately controversial when first exhibited in Cologne in 1923. It was acquired by the Dresden City Museum in 1928 but not exhibited there. The work was condemned by the Nazis, confiscated and included in the exhibition of degenerate art (Entartete Kunst) held in Munich in 1937. It was sold to an art dealer in early 1940, but its fate is not known. It is considered lost and may have been destroyed in the war.

== Background ==
Dix was an art student in Dresden before the First World War. He was conscripted in 1915 and served in the Imperial German Army as a machine gunner on the Eastern and Western Fronts. After the war, he returned to study at the Dresden Academy of Fine Arts and then in Italy. He was a founder of the short-lived avant-garde Dresdner Sezession art group and then supported the post-expressionist New Objectivity movement.

His horrific experiences in the trenches inspired the anti-war art he created after 1920, including The Trench. He had already come to public attention when featured by Theodor Däubler in Das Kunstblatt in 1920. He started to develop a reputation for controversy: in 1925, Dix successfully defended himself against charges of indecency following exhibitions in Berlin and Darmstadt of two paintings of prostitutes.

Dix returned to anti-war sentiments with a portfolio of fifty prints entitled The War ("Der Krieg"), published in 1924, and his 1929 to 1932 triptych, also entitled The War ("Der Krieg"), the central panel of which reworks themes from The Trench.

== Description ==
Dix starting working on The Trench while he was in Dresden in 1920 and completed it in 1923 after he had moved to Düsseldorf. It was painted in oils on a large canvas, 227 cm × 250 cm (89 in × 98 in), made from two pieces of heavy jute roughly joined together. The poor quality of the materials that Dix used meant that the painting began to deteriorate soon after it was completed.

It depicted the gory aftermath of an artillery bombardment of a German trench with the scene littered with the detritus of war: ruined building, military paraphernalia such as gas masks and fragmentary body parts from dead soldiers. The painting has been lost, but black and white photographs and contemporaneous descriptions have survived.

The best surviving contemporaneous description was published by Walter Schmits in the Kölnische Zeitung in on 7 December 1923:

"In the cold, sallow, ghostly light of dawn…a trench appears into which a devastating bombardment has just descended. A poisonous sulphur yellow pool glistens in the depths like a smirk from hell. Otherwise the trench is filled up with hideously mutilated bodies and human fragments. From open skulls brains gush like thick red groats; torn-up limbs, intestines, shreds of uniforms, artillery shells form a vile heap... Half-decayed remains of the fallen, which were probably buried in the walls of the trench out of necessity and were exposed by the exploding shells, mix with the fresh, blood covered corpses. One soldier has been hurled out of the trench and lies above it, impaled on stakes."

== Reception ==
Soon after it was completed, The Trench was acquired in October 1923 by the Wallraf–Richartz Museum in Cologne, the city then under Allied occupation, at the instigation of the museum's director Hans Friedrich Secker. The painting immediately became controversial when the museum's new modern art collection was opened to the public on 1 December 1923. It was framed simply with plain wood and concealed behind a grey curtain, but it still shocked the public and brought protests from former soldiers. It was described as "Wehrsabotage" ("war sabotage") and became known as the "Skandalbild" ("scandal image"). Contemporary news reports suggest the controversy may have led to an increased number of people visiting the museum so that they could view the painting.

The reception was not universally hostile and many critics praised the painting. The art historian Alfred Salmony, director of the Cologne Museum of Far Eastern Art, viewed the picture in Cologne in 1923, and describing it in Der Cicerone 16, published in January 1924, mentioning its "unerhörte Farben" ("outrageous colours") including a central yellow pool, and commending the truth of its depiction of war: "That is how it was on autumn days in the trenches south of Soissons. The picture knows no tendency, only meticulously accurate factual portrayal: this is war. [. . .] Dix paints without nightmare, without a thrill [. . .]. One does not understand these steel nerves. No one else would have been able to represent these heaped-up horrors in detail, to build a picture with them. [. . .]. The city of Cologne and its museum director will be attacked and praised for this acquisition [. . .]. Dix paints with a mature mastery of his means [. . .], as he must, with uninhibited creative power, from the abundance of seen experiences."

The art historian Heribert Reiners praised it in the Kölnische Zeitung on 1 December 1923: "inhaltlich vielleicht das grausigste Bild, das je gemalt wurde … und deshalb das Bild viele Gegner finden" ("in content, perhaps the most gruesome picture ever painted... and therefore the picture will find many opponents"). Supporters drew explicit parallels with the works of Matthias Grünewald.

The Trench was exhibited by Max Liebermann in the spring exhibition of the Prussian Academy of Arts in Berlin in 1924. The exhibition passed with little protest, but one critic, Julius Meier-Graefe, savaged it in the Deutsche Allgemeine Zeitung on 2 July 1924, soon after the exhibition had closed, saying the painting made him want to vomit. He was concerned that its status made it a German national document, but also a subversive threat. In an open letter to Hans Friedrich Secker, published in the Kölner Tageblatt in October 1924, Liebermann wrote that it was "eines der bedeutendsten Werke der Nachkriegszeit" ("one of the most important works of the post-war period").

The mayor of Cologne, Konrad Adenauer, was against the painting being kept by the museum. The strength of protests and criticism led the museum to return the painting to the artist in January 1925. The museum's director continued to acquire works by Dix, but eventually resigned in 1928.

The Trench was included in the Nie Wieder Krieg ("No More War") exhibition of the League for Human Rights that toured Germany in 1925, was exhibited at the International Art Exhibition in Zurich in late 1925, and was then included in Dix exhibitions held in Berlin and Munich in 1926. Finally, the painting was acquired by Dresden City Museum in 1928, but it was still considered too controversial for a public collection to put on display.

It was described by Alfred Barr in 1931 as "perhaps the most famous picture painted in post-war Europe, is [. . .] a masterpiece of unspeakable horror. [. . .] Painted with the uncanny verisimilitude of wax works, this staggering vision of decay in death lives through the terrific loathing which Dix has concentrated in it [...] . Dix is no decadent taster of gamey delights nor a mere amateur of the macabre. He is an artist who has gone through four years of ‘quiet’ on the Western Front and expressed himself subsequently with a certain lack of restraint."

== Degenerate art ==
Dix became a Professor of Painting at the Dresden Academy of Arts in 1926, but he was one of the first artists to lose his job after the Nazi Party came to power in Germany in 1933. He was prohibited from exhibiting his works and 260 of his paintings were confiscated from public collections.

The painting was included in the first Schandausstellung ("shame exhibition") organized by Richard Müller in the Neues Rathaus in Dresden in 1933, along with his 1920 painting Kriegskrüppel (War Cripples). Prominent Nazi visitors to the Dresden exhibition included Goebbels, Göring and Hitler, who remarked, "Es ist schade, daß man diese Leute nicht einsperren kann" ("It is a pity that these people cannot be imprisoned"). In June 1939, the painting was wanted by Georg Schmidt, the director of the Kunstmuseum Basel, and entered negotiations on buying it with the German art dealer Karl Buchholz, but the Museum-commission did not approve its purchase. Georg Schmidt was also in contact with Paul Westheim over its purchase, who encouraged him to buy the painting.

The Trench was one of eight works by Dix included in the Degenerate Art Exhibition in Munich in 1937. In the catalogue, it was described as "Gemalte Wehrsabotage des Malers Otto Dix" ("Painted military sabotage of the painter Otto Dix") and given a long entry which stated that in The Trench and his painting War Cripples: "Hier tritt die ‚Kunst' in den Dienst der marxistischen Propaganda für die Wehrpflichtverweigerung" ("Here, the 'art' enters the service of Marxist propaganda for conscientious objection").

The Trench was not included in the auction sale of some works of degenerate art by the German government in Lucerne in June 1939. When the Second World War broke out later in 1939, the painting was held in the former studio of Ernst Barlach in Güstrow. The evidence suggests it was bought in January 1940 by the art dealer Bernhard A. Böhmer for $200, so it was probably not burned with other art in Berlin in March 1939, but it remains lost; its destination and fate are unknown.

== Notes ==
=== Attribution ===
- Based on the German Wikipedia article: de:Schützengraben (Otto Dix)
