= Still Life with Beer Mug and Fruit =

1881 painting formerly attributed to Vincent van Gogh

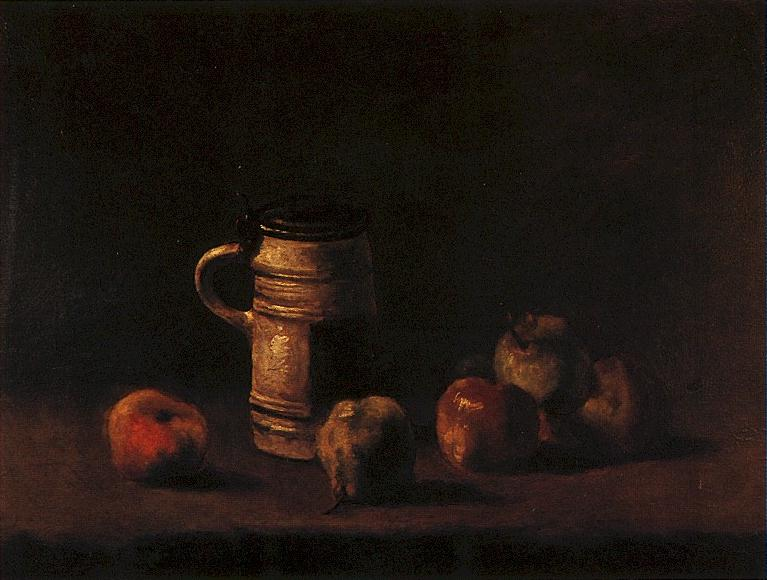
- Artist: Unknown
- Year: 1881
- Medium: Oil on canvas
- Dimensions: 44.5 cm × 57.5 cm (17.5 in × 22.6 in)
- Location: Von der Heydt Museum; Wuppertal

Still Life with Beer Mug and Fruit is an oil painting created in 1881.

The painting was originally attributed to Vincent van Gogh, but subsequently was found to be the work of an unknown artist.
