= Ferdinand Hardekopf =

German journalist and poet (1876–1954)

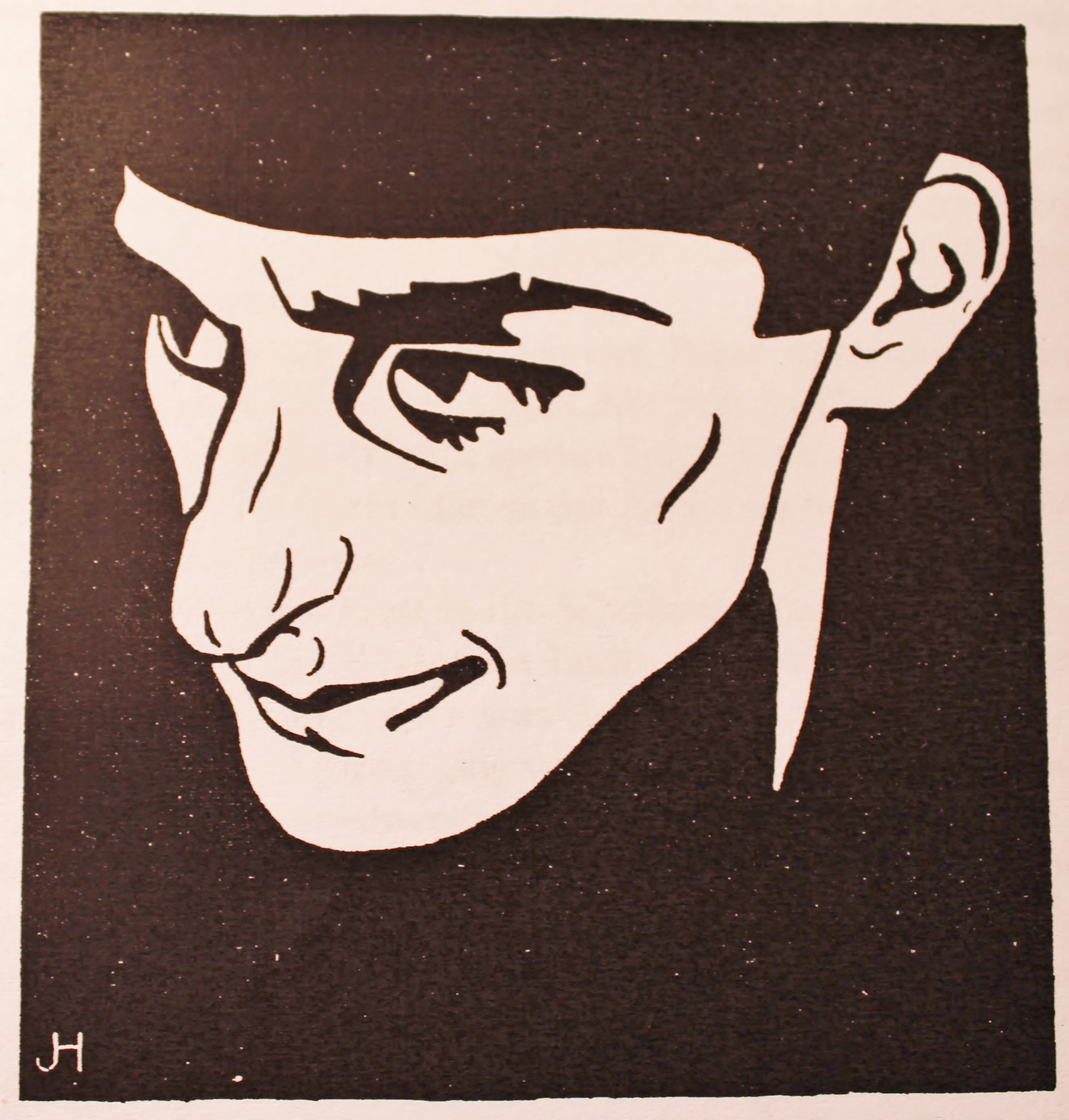
- Portrait of Ferdinand Hardekopf by John Höxter
- Born: 15 December 1876; Varel, Germany
- Died: 26 March 1954 (aged 77); Zurich, Switzerland
- Occupations: Journalist, writer, poet, translator

Ferdinand Hardekopf (15 December 1876 – 26 March 1954) was a German journalist, an Expressionist writer and poet, and translator from French into German.

== Life ==
Ferdinand Hardekopf was born in Varel, in North-western Germany. He attended university in Leipzig and Berlin.

After his studies he stayed in Berlin, where he first wrote literary and theater reviews for various newspapers and magazines, such as Die Schaubühne (the forerunner of the Weltbühne) and for the Münchner Neueste Nachrichten. He quickly became a sought-after critic, initially primarily as a variety show and theater reviewer for the weekly newspaper Die Schaubühne. From 1906 to 1912, Hardekopf published around 50 articles in that journal. From 1911 he published in the mouthpiece of Expressionism, the weekly magazine Die Aktion. After his studies, Hardekopf had worked as a stenographer in the state parliaments of Dresden and Weimar as well as in the Leipzig city council. From 1904 to 1916 he held a position as parliamentary stenographer in the German Reichstag. This bread and butter job secured him a reasonably regular income, with which he was also able to finance several trips. In 1910 he undertook a trip to France together with his then partner Emmy Hennings.

A pacifist, in 1916 he left Germany for neutral Zurich, where he associated with Hugo Ball and the nascent Dada movement. After the war ended, he returned to Germany, but emigrated to France in 1922.

From 1919 to 1923, he lived with Sylvia von Harden, with whom he had a son; afterwards, in France, he lived with the actress Sita Straub, whom he later married.

He was interned during the German occupation of France, and in 1946 moved to Switzerland. He died in Zurich in 1954 in the psychiatric clinic of the university hospital.

Reportedly, he refused throughout his life ever to hold a German passport.

== Works ==
- Gesammelte Dichtungen. Hrsg. und biographische Einleitung von Emmy Moor-Wittenbach. Verlag Die Arche, Zürich 1963.
- Berlin 1907–1909. Theaterkritiken aus der Schaubühne. Herausgegeben von Arne Drews. Revonnah Verlag, Hannover 1997, ISBN 3-927715-46-8.
- Wir Gespenster. Dichtungen. Hrsg. und Nachwort von Wilfried F. Schoeller. Arche, Zürich/Hamburg 2004, ISBN 3-7160-2329-9, enthält:
  - Der Abend. Ein Dialog (1913)
  - Lesestücke (1916)
  - Privatgedichte (1921)
- Ferdinand Hardekopf: Briefe aus Berlin. Feuilletons 1899–1902. Nimbus. Kunst und Bücher, ISBN 978-3-03850-015-5.
