= Metropolis (Dix) =

1928 triptych painting by Otto Dix

- Großstadt (German)
- Artist: Otto Dix
- Year: 1927–28
- Medium: Oil and tempera on panel
- Movement: New Objectivity
- Dimensions: 181 cm × 402 cm (71 in × 158 in)
- Location: Kunstmuseum, Stuttgart

Metropolis (German: Großstadt) is a triptych painting by the German artist Otto Dix, executed between 1927 and 1928. The painting depicts three nighttime city scenes from the Weimar Republic. The painting belongs to the Kunstmuseum Stuttgart since it was bought from the artist's estate in 1972.

== Description ==
The main topic of the triptych is the different aspects of the nightlife in a German big city of the golden twenties. The interior of a dance bar is shown on the middle panel. A band dominated by brass is playing on the left. The rich and beautiful sit and stand on the right. The women present visible jewelry and wear dresses, the fabrics and patterns of which could also be found in medieval paintings. The two groups are joined by a couple dancing the Charleston. Their bodies are reflected in the polished parquet. The background of the room is kept dark red. On the left panel, several prostitutes stand contemptuously in front of the bar's red-lit entrance, looking at two men, one lying on the floor and the other a war cripple. The men are barked at by a dog. On the very outside you can see an almost hidden woman looking out of a gate. The right panel shows a group of high-class prostitutes dressed in furs, who seem to be striving towards the viewer in a row and carelessly walking past another war cripple. The fur collar and the red dress of the foremost reproduce the appearance of a vulva. The right panel ends in a wild architecture that does not seem to be correct.

The themes of the painting are femininity, decadence and sexuality in the modern city. The art professor Marsha Meskimmon has written how the war veterans are "shown weakened in every way by the aggressive sexuality of Weimar women. Both the economic and sexual bargaining power rests with the demonized whores of modernity."

== Analysis ==
The painter was inspired by several Medieval and Renaissance works of art for this painting, including the Herrenberg Altarpiece by Jerg Ratgeb, and works of Hans von Köln and Hans Pleydenwurff.

Otto Dix exhibited the picture for the first time at one of the three exhibitions marking the 100th anniversary of the Saxon Art Association, in 1928. On the middle panel, he also portrayed several members of the Saxon art business. The man with the monocle on the right is the architect Wilhelm Kreis. The head of the Saxon State Chancellery, Alfred Schulze, is shown as the saxophone player. The prominent position of the saxophone can also be explained by the phonetic similarity between the words Saxony and saxophone. The female dancer in the middle is generally identified with Martha Dix, the painter's wife. It is not clear whether the male dancer is a highly idealized portrait of the painter himself.

== Criticism ==
Metropolis received a mixed reception. Nikolaus Pevsner, at the time Assistant Keeper at the Dresden Gallery, gave a positive response. However, Dix was targeted by several of the volkisch art critics, including Richard Müller and Bettina Feistel-Rohmeder.

== See also ==
- New Objectivity
- Weimar culture
