= Kunstmuseum Stuttgart =

Contemporary and modern art museum in Stuttgart, Germany

Coordinates: 48°46′42″N 9°10′40″E

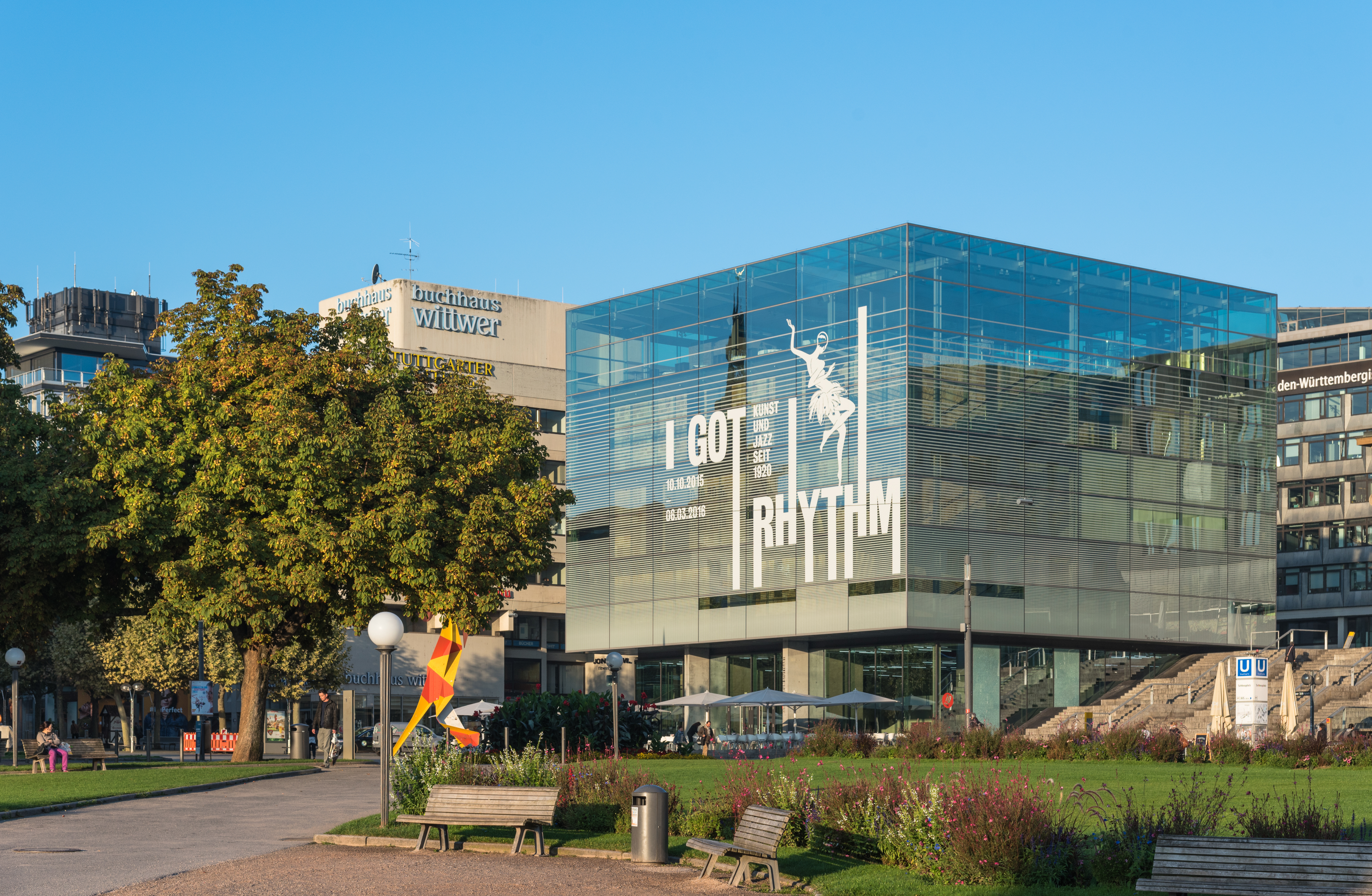
- Glass facade of the museum
- Established: 2005
- Location: Kleiner Schlossplatz 13, 70173 Stuttgart, Germany
- Type: Art museum
- Director: Ulrike Groos
- Website: www.kunstmuseum-stuttgart.de/en

The Kunstmuseum Stuttgart is a contemporary and modern art museum in Stuttgart, Germany, built and opened in 2005.

== Description ==
The cubic museum building with 5000 m^{2} of display space was designed by Berlin architects Hascher and Jehle. During the day it looks like a glass cube, and at nights the interior lighted limestone walls become visible.

=== Collection ===
Metropolis by Otto Dix, 1927–28

The Kunstmuseum Stuttgart museum's collection comes from the previous "Galerie der Stadt Stuttgart". The city's collection goes back to a gift from the Marchese Silvio della Valle di Casanova in 1924.

It contains one of the most important collections of the work of Otto Dix including his Metropolis, Prague Street, and Portrait of the Dancer Anita Berber as well as works from Willi Baumeister, Adolf Hölzel, Dieter Roth, and others.

== Construction History ==
The site now occupied by the cubic structure of the new Kunstmuseum was once home to the ruins of the Kronprinzenpalais, which had been damaged during an air raid in 1944. The Kronprinzenpalais had served as an urban counterpart to the Wilhelmspalais at the opposite end of the Planie. After the ruins were demolished in 1963, the Planie was redeveloped into a six-lane road with four additional tunnels designed for both cars and trams.

To make crossing in the Königstraße easier for pedestrians, the stair-like Kleine Schloßplatz was constructed in 1968. However, it never fully met its intended purpose and was not widely embraced. For years, discussions revolved around demolishing the structure, as it was seen as unnecessary, especially after the surface-level street had been covered again. The construction of the new Kunstmuseum after the year 2000 filled this gap in the urban landscape next to the Königsbau along Königstraße.

== Management ==
The first director of the Kunstmuseum Stuttgart, Marion Ackermann, became the director of the Kunstsammlung NRW in Düsseldorf in 2009. Ulrike Groos, former director of the Kunsthalle Düsseldorf, took over the leadership of the Kunstmuseum in 2010.

== See also ==
- List of museums in Germany
