= Von der Heydt Museum =

Museum in Germany

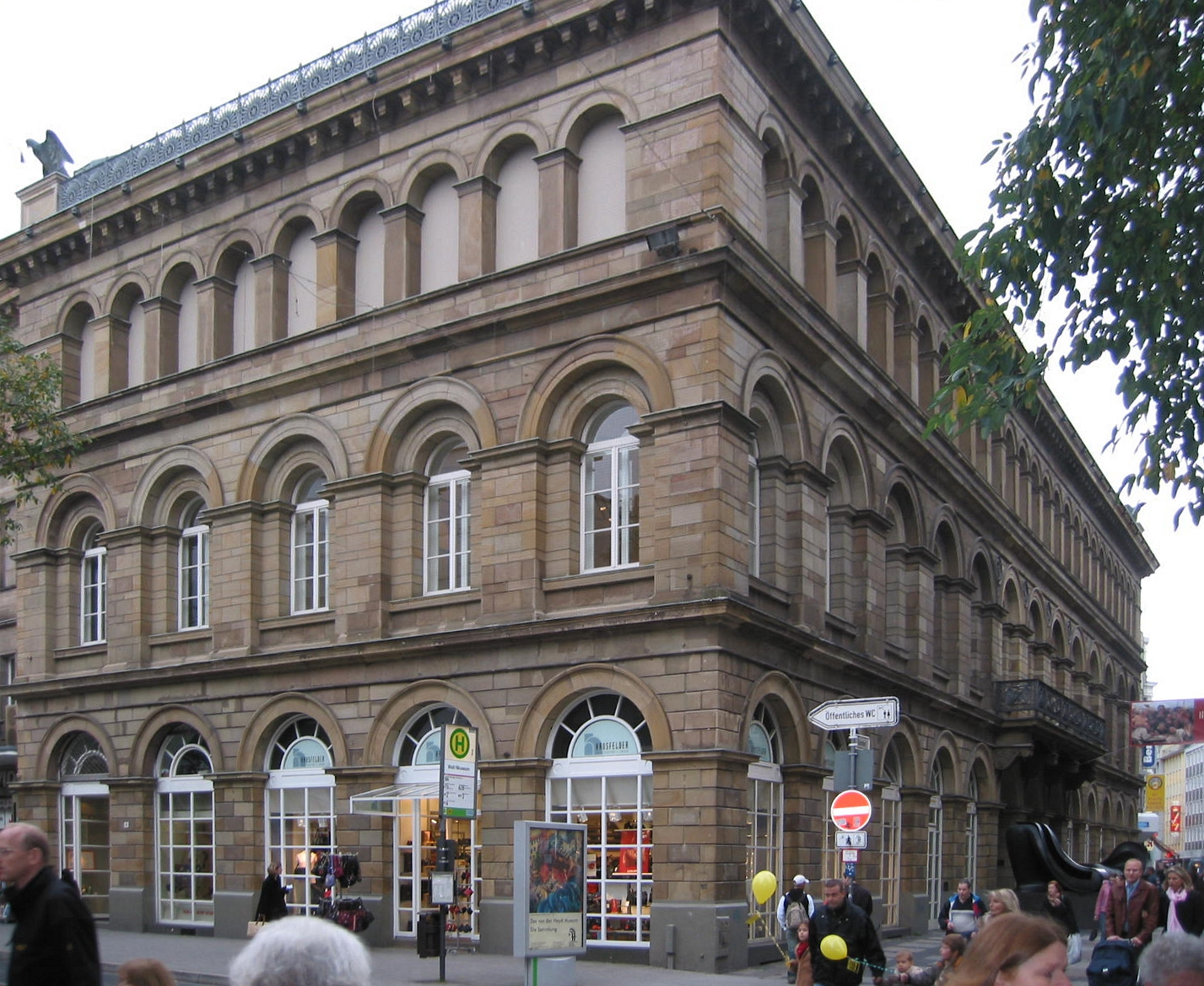
- Von der Heydt Museum
- Interactive fullscreen map
- Location: Wuppertal, Germany
- Coordinates: 51°15′26″N 7°8′48″E

The Von der Heydt Museum is a museum in Wuppertal, Germany.

The Von der Heydt Museum includes works by artists from the 17th century to the present time.

== History ==
The museum is housed in the former city hall of Elberfeld, which in 1902 became a municipal museum.

The museum was named in 1961 after the Von der Heydt family. Banker August von der Heydt and his son Eduard von der Heydt (1882–1964) were important patrons.

In July 2023, the museum restituted the painting “Portrait of Felix Benjamin” by Max Liebermann to Felix Benjamin. The museum had acquired the painting in 2002 from Lempertz.

== Notable works ==
- Still Life with Beer Mug and Fruit

== Gallery ==
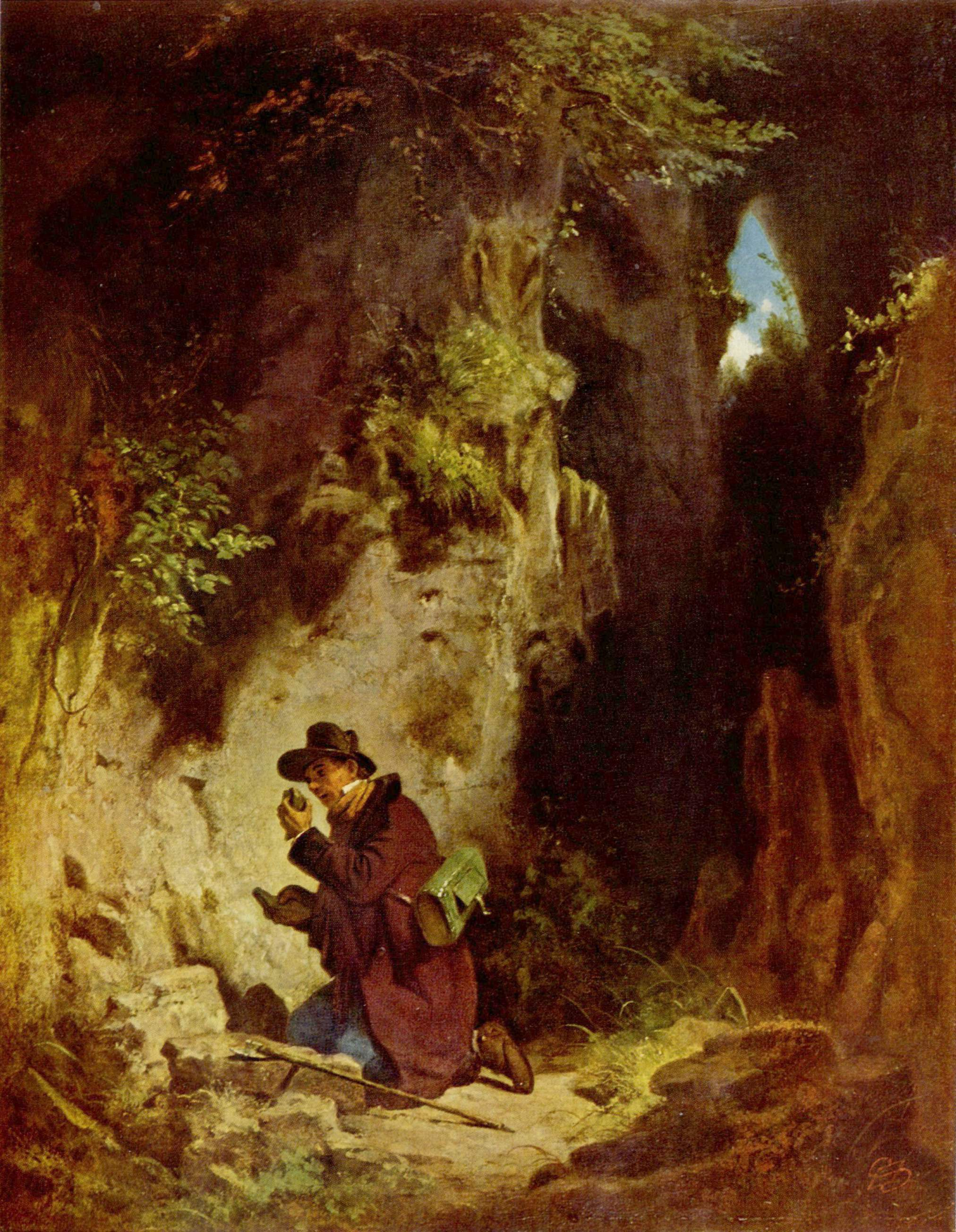
Carl Spitzweg, Der Geologe, 1855/60

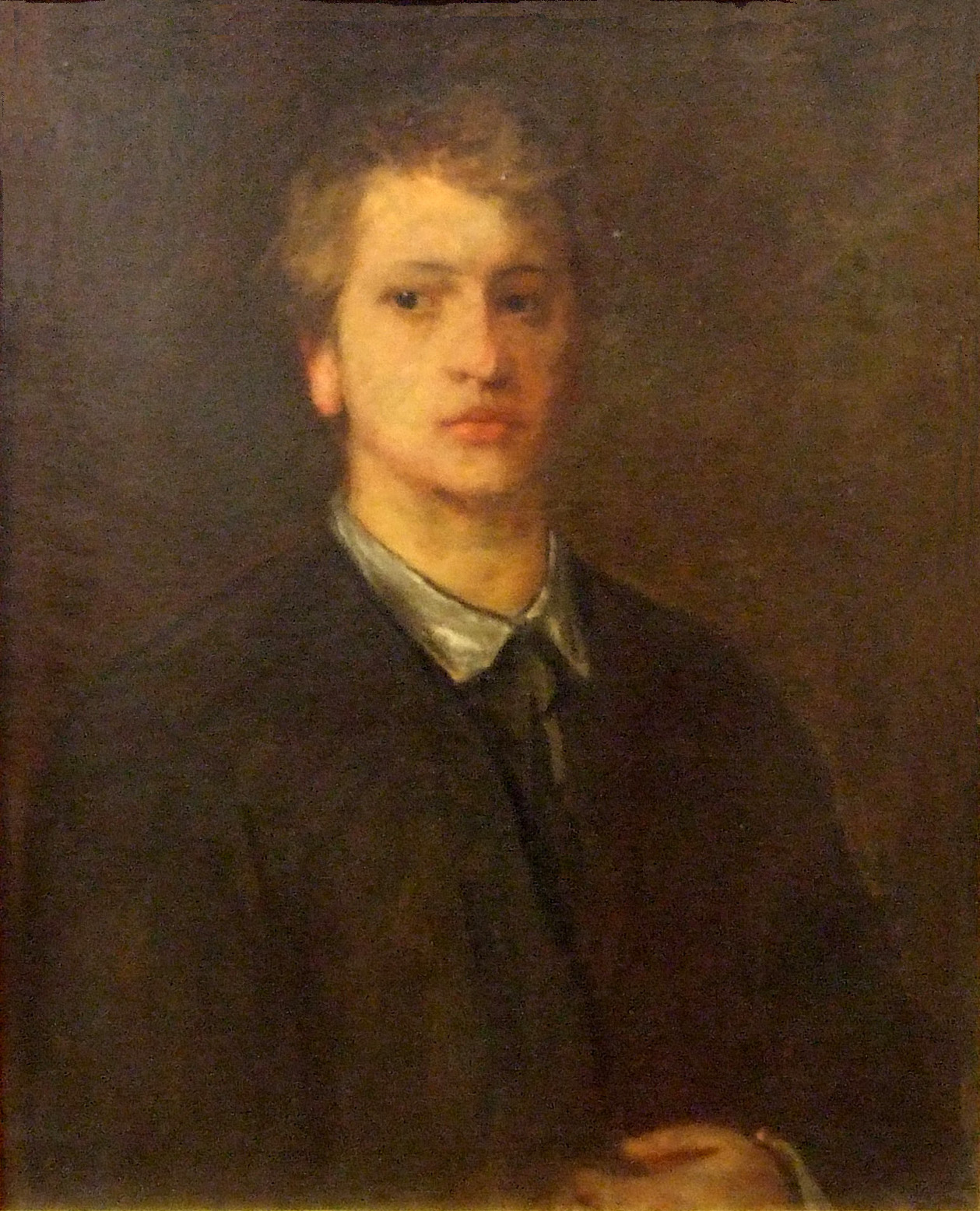
Hans von Marées, Porträt Adolf von Hildebrand, c. 1868

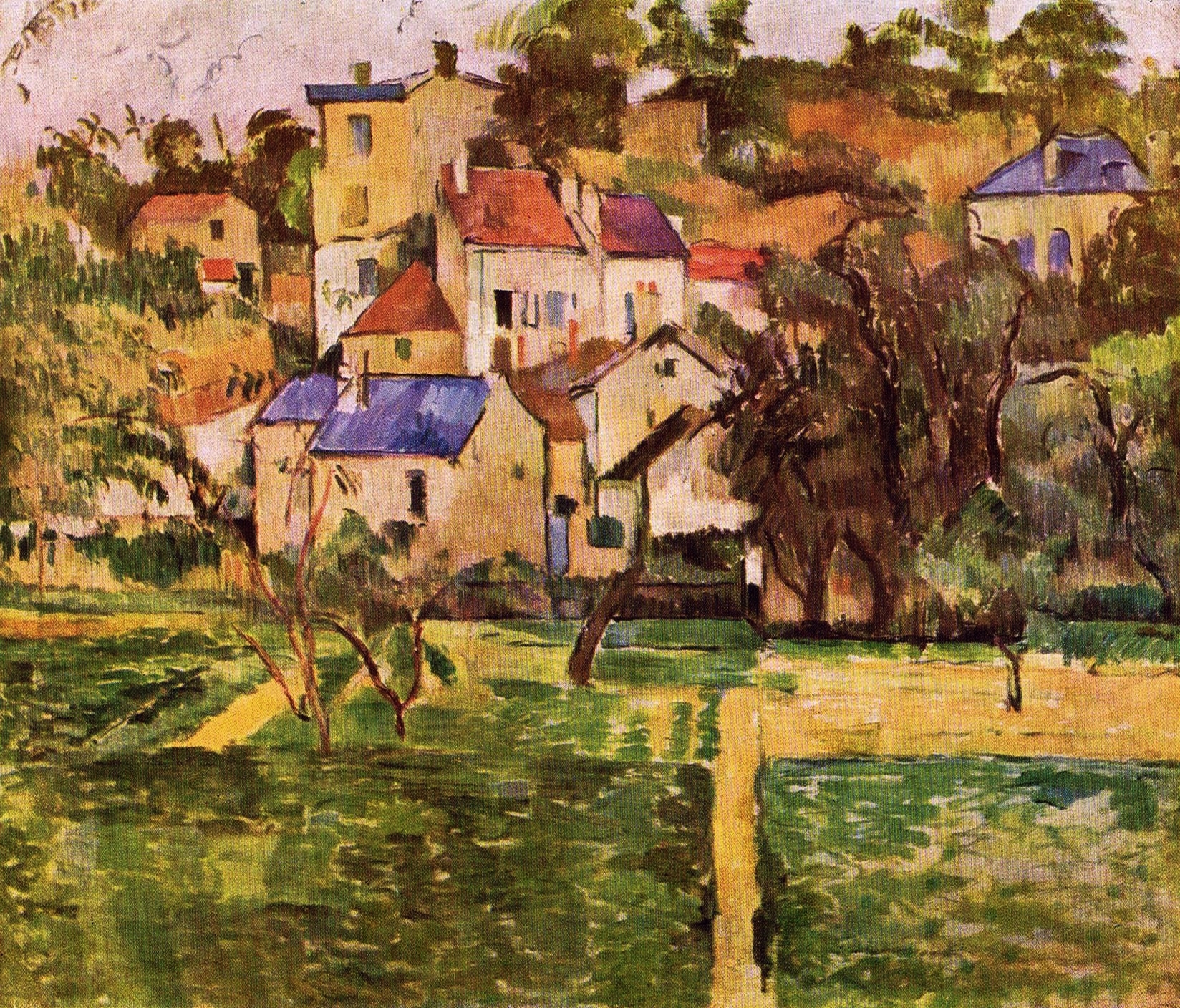
Paul Cézanne, Die eremitage in Pontoise, 1881

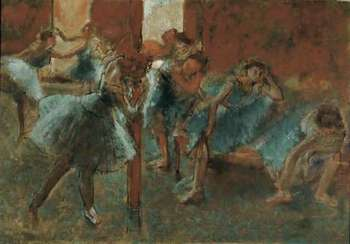
Edgar Degas, Tänzerinnen im Probensaal, 1891

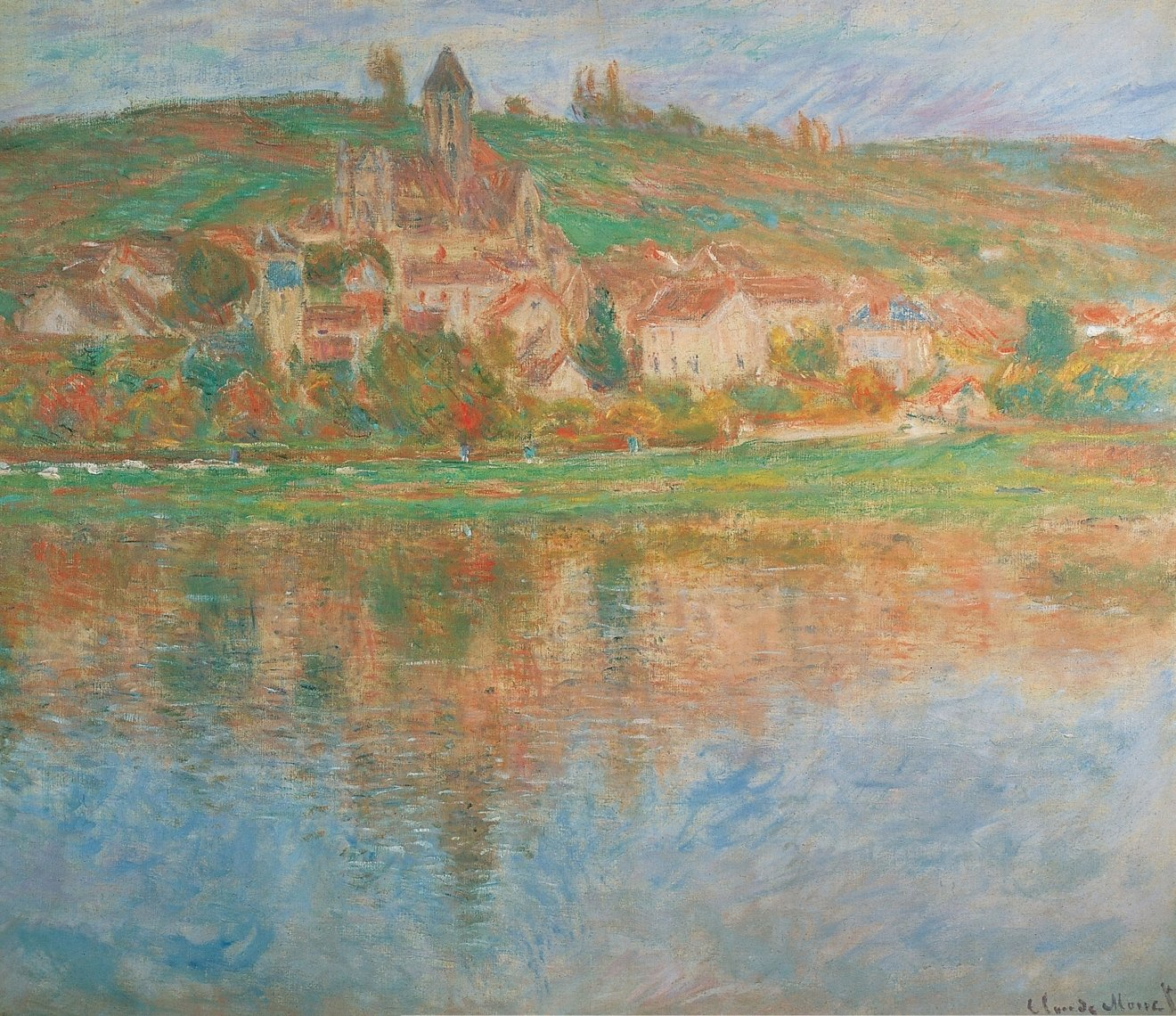
Claude Monet, Vétheuil, c. 1901

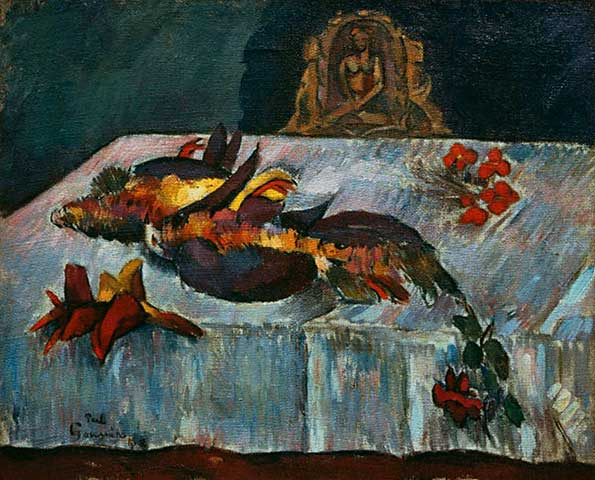
Paul Gauguin, Stillleben mit exotischen Vögeln II, 1902

Otto Dix, To Beauty, 1922

== Directors ==
- 1902–1929: Friedrich Fries (1865–1954)
- 1929–1952: Victor Dirksen (1887–1955)
- 1953–1962: Harald Seiler (1910–1976)
- 1962–1985: Günter Aust (1921–2018)
- 1985–2006: Sabine Fehlemann (1941–2008)
- 2006– 1 May 2019: Gerhard Finckh (born 1952)
- since 1 April 2020 Roland Mönig (born 1965)
