= The Beggars =

Painting by Pieter Bruegel the Elder

The Beggars (The Cripples)
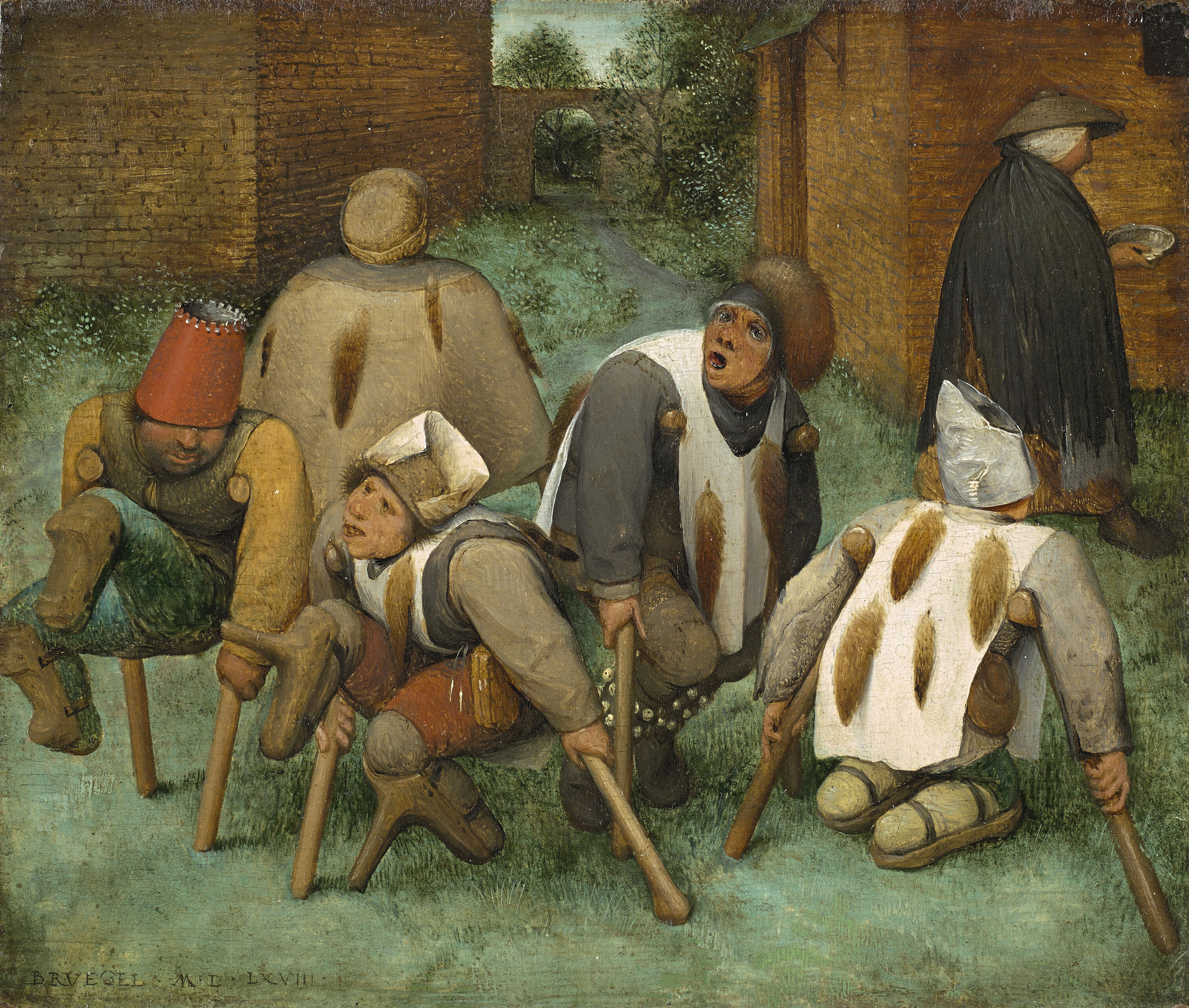
- Artist: Pieter Bruegel the Elder
- Year: 1568
- Type: Oil on panel
- Dimensions: 18.5 cm × 21.5 cm (7.3 in × 8.5 in)
- Location: Louvre, Paris

The Beggars or The Cripples is an oil-on-panel by the Netherlandish Renaissance artist Pieter Bruegel the Elder, painted in 1568. It is now in the Louvre, in Paris. Its also is the only painting by Bruegel in the Louvre, received as a gift in 1892.

== History ==
Attempts have been made to interpret the picture of five disabled people and a beggar-woman as an allusion to a historical event: the badger's tails, or foxes' tails, on their clothes might refer to the Gueux, a rebel party formed against the government of Philip II of Spain and Granvelle; but these also occur in Bruegel's The Fight Between Carnival and Lent in Vienna, dated 1559. Still, the beggars are not quite ordinary beggars, as they wear carnival headgear representing various classes of society: a cardboard crown (the king), a paper shako (the soldier), a beret (the bourgeois), a cap (the peasant), and a mitre (the bishop). The work clearly has some satirical meaning, which has so far eluded interpretation. Perhaps physical imperfections are meant to symbolise moral decrepitude, which can affect all men irrespective of class.

On the back of the painting are two inscriptions which seem to date from the 16th century. One is in Flemish, and in a very fragmentary state; the other is in Latin and records the admiration some humanist felt for Bruegel, whose art surpasses Nature itself.

The painting dates from the end of Bruegel's career, when he showed a keener interest in the natural world. Tiny though it is, the landscape seen through the opening is bathed in a delicate light which simmers like dew on the foliage.

== Description ==
On the back of the painting is written:

What nature lacks, is lacking in our art,
So great was the grace accorded to our painter.
Here nature, expressed in painted forms, is astonished
To see through these cripples that Bruegel is her equal.

== Analysis ==
Modern eyes may be inclined to conclude that Bruegel intended to invoke sympathy for the plight of the disabled figures, but from a historical perspective this is unlikely. Europeans of Bruegel's time gave little regard to beggars, and the painting provides hints that Bruegel shared this denigration: the figures are outside the town walls and are posed in such ways as to provoke contempt and amusement. The foxes' tails on some of the figures was a symbol at the time of ridicule in political caricature and real life. The woman behind them bears an empty bowl and may appear to be ignoring the beggars.

== See also ==
- List of paintings by Pieter Bruegel the Elder
