= The War (Dix triptych) =

Triptych by Otto Dix

- Artist: Otto Dix
- Year: 1929–1932
- Medium: Oil and tempera on wood
- Dimensions: 204 cm × 112 cm (6.69 ft × 3.67 ft)
- Location: Galerie Neue Meister, Dresden

The War (German: "Der Krieg"), sometimes known as the Dresden War Triptych, is a large oil and tempera painting by the German artist Otto Dix on four wooden panels, a triptych with predella. The format of the work and its composition are based on religious triptychs of the Renaissance, like those by Matthias Grünewald. It was begun in 1929 and completed in 1932, and has been held by the Galerie Neue Meister in Dresden since 1968. It is one of several anti-war works done by Dix in the 1920s, inspired by his experience of trench warfare in the First World War.

== Background ==
Dix was an art student in Dresden before the First World War. He was conscripted in 1915, and served in the Imperial German Army as a machine gunner on the Eastern and Western Fronts. He returned to study at the Dresden Academy of Fine Arts, and then in Italy. After the war, he was a founder of the short-lived avant-garde Dresdner Sezession art group, and then supported the post-expressionist New Objectivity movement. The anti-war art that Dix created after 1920 was inspired by his horrific experiences in the trenches. Before this triptych, he completed his large anti-war painting The Trench in 1923, which caused great controversy when first exhibited, and he published a portfolio of fifty prints also entitled Der Krieg in 1924.

Dix became a professor at the Dresden Academy in 1927. He started working on the triptych soon after the tenth anniversary of the end of the First World War, as a reaction to the popular public perception of the war as a heroic experience. The painting was first exhibited at the autumn exhibition of the Berlin Academy of Arts in 1932.

Many of Dix's works were condemned as degenerate art by the Nazi Party, but the triptych was hidden by Dix and survived. Several of Dix's preparatory cartoons are held by the Hamburger Kunsthalle. The War was purchased by the Galerie Neue Meister in Dresden for 500,000 Deutsche Marks in 1968.

== Description ==
The triptych has three main panels, with a fourth as a supporting panel or predella below the main central panel. The large central panel is a 204 cm (80 in) square; the flanking panels to either side the same height but half the width, 102 cm (40 in) each; and the predella below the central panel has the same width but is only 60 cm (24 in) high.

From left to right, the left wing depicts a column of German soldiers marching away from the viewer through the fog of war towards the battle in the central scene. The central panel shows a devastated urban landscape scattered with war paraphernalia and body parts, reworking the themes in his 1923 work The Trench, and divided like the 16th-century Isenheim Altarpiece of Matthias Grünewald with a living side to the lower left and a dead side to the upper right. A skeletal figure floats above the scene, pointing to the right, with a soldier in gas mask below, and scabrous legs upended to the right, recalling the legs of Christ in Grünewald's crucifixion scene. The right wing shows several figures withdrawing from the fight. A dominant greyish figure, helping a wounded comrade, is a self-portrait of Dix, in a composition similar to a descent from the cross or a pietà. In the predella, several soldiers are lying next to each other, possibly sleeping under an awning, or perhaps they represent the dead in a tomb. This fourth panel is based on The Body of the Dead Christ in the Tomb by Hans Holbein the Younger.

The painting uses a restricted palette of mainly dark colours, with cold greens, greys, and whites for death and decay, and warm reds and oranges for blood, destruction and shellfire.

The triptych was painted on limewood panels prepared with a traditional glue Gesso containing gypsum and zinc white. The transferred line drawing of the composition was fixed with a thin black oil Underpainting, followed by a warm red-brown underpainting composed of lead white with red and black earth pigments. A subsequent layer of warm, translucent, off-white tempera–oil emulsion (Tempera grassa), tinted with yellow ochre and other earth pigments, added luminosity and the textured surface visible across much of the work. Applied in several passes, this layer was also used to adjust and finalize the composition. The painting was completed with multiple semi-transparent green-brown and other coloured oil Glazes, with localized retouching and occasional Alla prima brushwork on the upper surface to unify tones and enrich depth.

== See also ==
- Dresden Triptych
