= Portrait of the Journalist Sylvia von Harden =

1926 painting by Otto Dix

- Artist: Otto Dix
- Year: 1926
- Medium: Oil and tempera on wood
- Dimensions: 121 cm × 89 cm (48 in × 35 in)
- Location: Musée National d'Art Moderne, Paris

The Portrait of the Journalist Sylvia von Harden (German: Bildnis der Journalistin Sylvia von Harden) is a painting by German painter Otto Dix, from 1926. It is made from a wood panel and a mixed technique of oil and tempera. The portrait was acquired from the artist by the Musée National d'Art Moderne in Paris in 1961.

== Description ==
The portrait is set on a red and pink background, without decoration, door or window, which suggests the corner of a cafe. The androgynous looking woman sits cross-legged at a round table. She wears a red and black plaid dress with a high neck, and holds a cigarette in her right hand. The fingers are long with slightly protruding bones, and the jaw is triangular with a pointed chin. A long, clean nose separates the eyes surrounded by dark circles. She wears a monocle on the right eye. Her brown hair is very short, a typical bobbed haircut of the 1920s. The mouth, slightly ajar, highlighted with dark red lipstick, stands out against her pale skin. The woman is wearing light stockings, the rolled top of which can be seen on the right leg.

The woman's feet are not visible, because the portrait stops at mid-calf. On the table with a white marble top are a cigarette box marked with the name Sylvia von Harden, a matchbox bearing the German eagle and a conical glass three-quarters full. The round shapes of the Art Nouveau furniture contrast with the geometric shapes of the character and the objects.

The character occupies the left half of the painting. The absence of decorative background elements accentuates her strong "presence", with nothing distracting the viewer's eye. The journalist poses three-quarters and looks sideways between the plane of the painting and the perpendicular one, which links the viewer to the portrait.

== Background ==
The sitter described his genesis in her article, "Erinnerungen an Otto Dix" ("Memories of Otto Dix"), in 1959. The painter met her on the street by chance and was impressed with her looks. He stated:

'I must paint you! I simply must!... You are representative of an entire epoch!'
'So, you want to paint my lacklustre eyes, my ornate ears, my long nose, my thin lips; you want to paint my long hands, my short legs, my big feet—things which can only scare people off and delight no-one?'
'You have brilliantly characterized yourself, and all that will lead to a portrait representative of an epoch concerned not with the outward beauty of a woman but rather with her psychological condition.'

Von Harden agreed to pose for the painter, and sat for several sessions in the following weeks.

== In culture ==
The portrait might have served as an inspiration for Secretary at West German Radio, Cologne. Both are products of the New Objectivity artistic movement.

The portrait was recreated in the opening and closing scenes of the film Cabaret (1972) by Bob Fosse, set in Berlin during the Weimar Republic.
