= Martha Dix =

German gold and silver smith; wife and model of painter Otto Dix

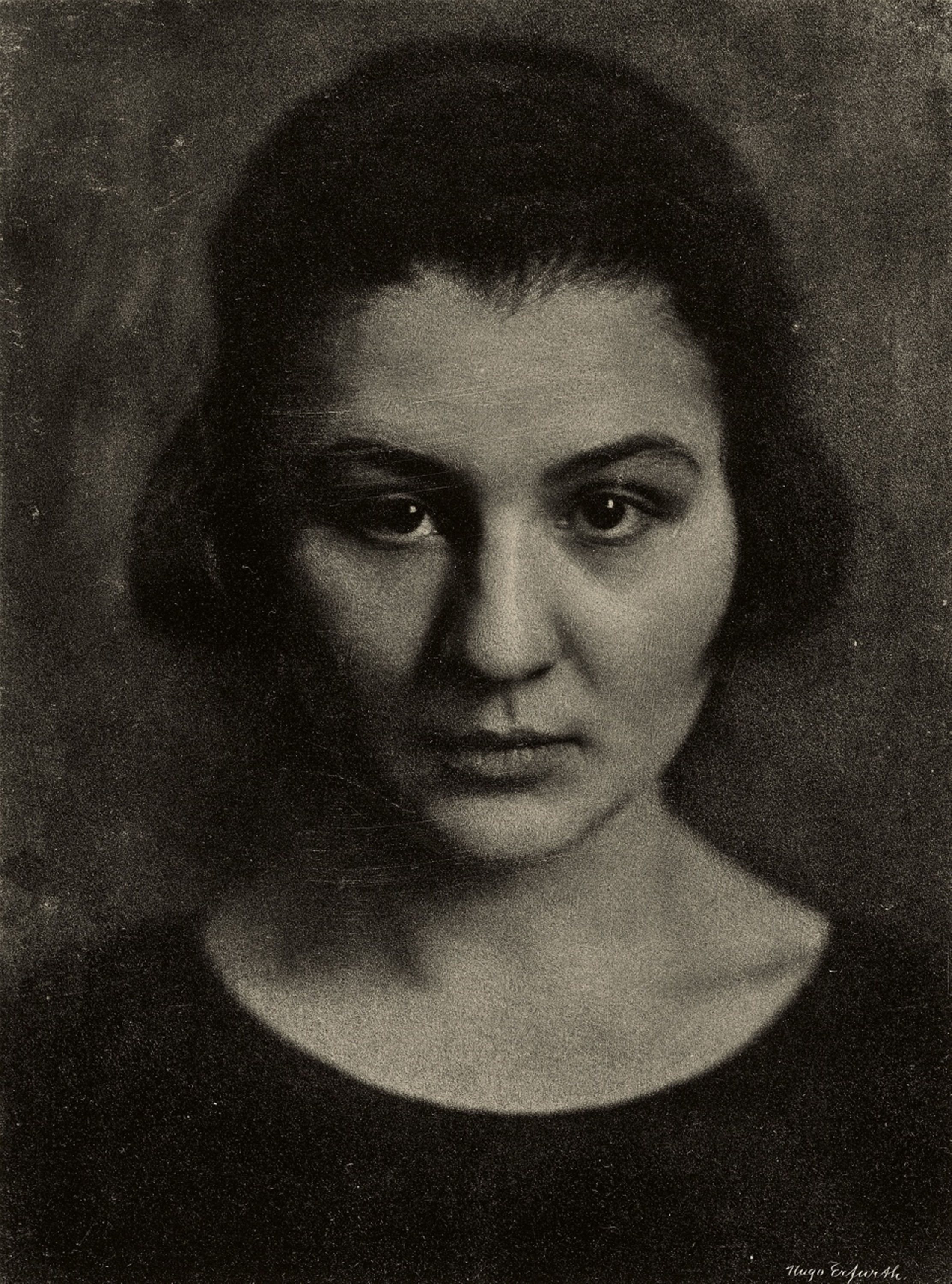
Martha Dix, photographed by Hugo Erfurth (1922)

Martha Dix (née Lindner; other married name Koch; July 19, 1895 – March 6, 1985) was a German goldsmith and silversmith who was the wife of the painter Otto Dix. She was portrayed many times by her husband from 1921 to 1933. A well-known double portrait of the couple appears in the photographer August Sander's portfolio People of the 20th Century (1925).

== Life ==
Martha Lindner was born in Cologne in 1895 as the youngest of four children into a wealthy middle-class family. Her mother was Maria Juliane Lindner (née Rottluger), and her father was Bernhard Lindner, an insurance director. In addition to her mother tongue, she learned several foreign languages (French, Italian, English and Russian) and piano. In addition to music, she was also interested in fine arts and design from an early age, so she attended the Cologne Sonderbund exhibition when she was 17. She is described as “self-confident, assertive and demanding” and "well-educated".

In 1914 she got engaged to the urologist Hans Koch, who would have preferred to have a relationship with her sister, five years older than her. The couple married in 1915 while Koch was still in the war; he returned to Düsseldorf due to an injury. where he opened his own art gallery ("Graphinett") after the war.

During this marriage with Koch, Martha gave birth to two children, the son Martin, called "Muggeli" (born 1917) and the daughter Han (born 1920), called "Hanali". A ménage à trois between Maria, Martha and Hans Koch is assumed, as the Cologne gallery owner Karl Nierendorf, who was also in love with Maria, described in his notes.

In October 1921, Otto Dix came to Düsseldorf at the invitation of Johanna Ey and Hans Koch, where he sold the latter two works and received his first portrait commission from him. He worked in the Koch house and the result was the unflattering portrait of Dr. Hans Koch. A love affair quickly developed between Martha Koch and Otto Dix, which culminated in the fact that she went to Dresden with him for a few months before returning to Düsseldorf. Hugo Erfurth's photographs from Dix's circle of friends in Dresden were taken during this early period.

Martha Dix proved that, despite her upper-class background, she was practical and adaptable. For example, she renovated the shared apartment and took care of the everyday things of living together. The two also enjoyed the urban life in the 1920s.

Otto and Martha Dix ("Jim and Mutzli") initially stayed in Düsseldorf. In the autumn of 1925 the family moved with their two and a half year old daughter Nelly into an apartment on Kaiserdamm in Berlin. Martha Dix's father had paid the rent for seven years in advance. In 1927, her son Ursus was born, and in 1928 she gave birth to her youngest son Jan. From 1927, Otto Dix had a professorship at the Dresden Art Academy, from which he was dismissed in 1933 by the National Socialists.

The Dix family first moved to Randegg Castle, which belonged to Hans Koch and initially lived in more or less precarious circumstances, as Dix was also prohibited from exhibiting. In 1935/1936, after the death of her father, Martha Dix had her own house and studio built with her inheritance in Hemmenhofen on the Lake Constance; she herself was registered as the client. The house remained the center of the Dix family's life for decades and this is where the three children grew up. Otto Dix traveled to Dresden until 1943 and annually after 1947, where he had a long-time lover Käthe König, with whom he had a daughter born in 1939. At the end of the war, Otto Dix was once again deployed and was in French captivity until February 1946. Members of the French occupation troops were quartered in the house in Hemmenhofen, which Martha Dix said she was able to come to terms with, among other things, because she spoke French.

Their daughter Nelly died in 1953, and Martha and Otto Dix took their granddaughter Bettina to live with them. After Otto Dix's death in 1969, she adopted Bettina in 1972 and traveled with her to Thailand, Morocco and France. After she had a first heart attack in 1979, Martha Dix moved to Sarrians in Provence, France, to live with her granddaughter Bettina, from where she made further trips to Greece and Turkey.

She handed over the house in Hemmenhofen and the rights to her husband's estate to the Otto Dix Foundation, which she founded in 1983, and whose shareholders were her two sons and granddaughter Bettina Dix-Pfefferkorn.

Dix died on March 6, 1985, in Sarrians, France.

== Martha portrayed by Otto Dix ==
Between 1921 and 1933, Otto Dix portrayed Martha as often as otherwise only himself; in total it is the motif in over seventy paintings, watercolors and drawings. No other person plays such a diverse role in the artist's work as Martha. Most of the pictures were done in Düsseldorf, Dresden and Berlin, starting with portrait sketches in October 1921, when the couple was just getting to know each other in the Koch house, to the first representative oil painting that shows her as a complex personality, in black fur with a red hat.

Dix's portraits show his wife in a wide variety of roles. "Sometimes she is a muse and witty companion, sometimes a sophisticated woman, sometimes a mother and family center". However, he never painted them in a sexualized or erotic way, as is known from his other works, where he painted prostitutes and their surroundings. Two drawings from 1923 depicting “Mutzli” waking up in the morning are the ultimate eroticism that can be found in his pictures of Martha.

Dix was also present at the birth of his children, which was unusual for the time - he was drawing - from these experiences the unfinished painting Birth and Newborn Child on Hands (Ursus) emerged. This is followed by a whole series of works dealing with the theme of motherhood, children and family, including the painting The Artist's Family with clear echoes of traditional depictions of the Holy Family, albeit ironically. The last paintings with Martha Dix as a motif was made in 1928 (Mrs. Martha Dix I and II). In 1927 Otto Dix had started the long-term parallel relationship with Käthe König. A penultimate drawing, which differs greatly from the previous illustrations, Mutz Sitting was created in 1933, “distant and without illusions”. Martha Dix only reappears as a motif in a picture book from 1955 that was later created for her granddaughter Bettina.
