= Wilhelm Schnarrenberger =

German painter

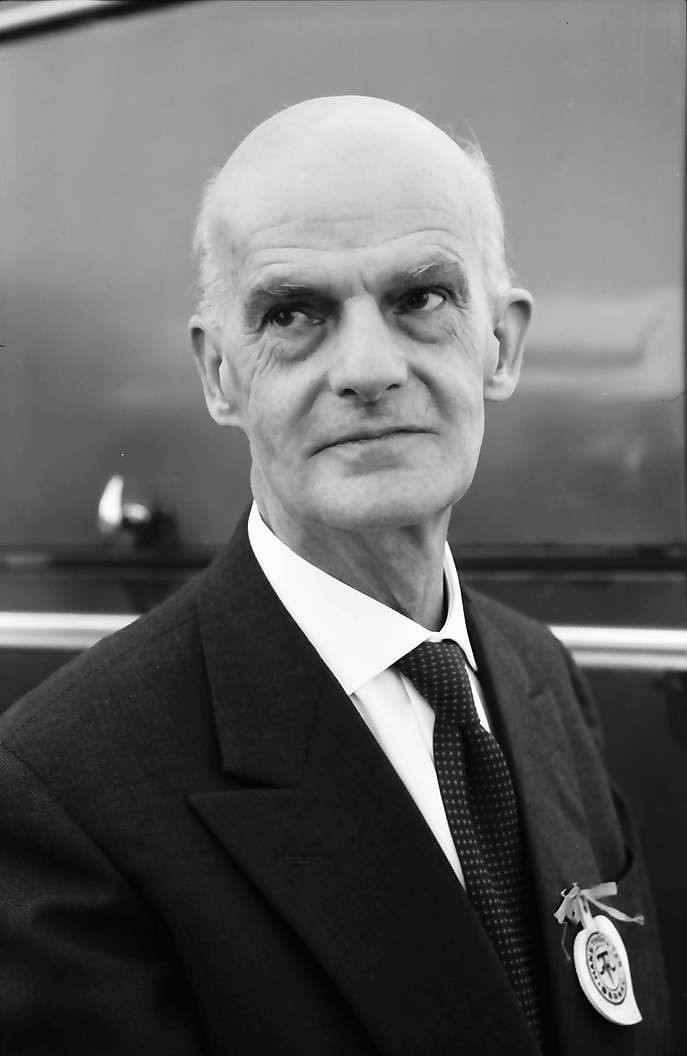
Wilhelm Schnarrenberger (1962)

Wilhelm Schnarrenberger (June 30, 1892 – April 12, 1966) was a German painter associated with the New Objectivity.

He was born in Buchen. From 1911 to 1916 he studied at the Munich School of Arts and Crafts. He had his first solo exhibition in 1916 at Hans Goltz' gallery in Munich. In that same year he began a period of military service.

By 1920 he had returned to Munich, where he contributed illustrations to magazines such as Simplicissimus and Wieland. In 1921 he was made a professor of commercial art at the Karlsruhe Academy and joined the "Rih" group of artists that included Karl Hubbuch, Rudolph Schlichter, and Georg Scholz. At about this time, he published a series of lithographs of meticulously rendered landscape scenes.

The influence of Henri Rousseau is evident in Schnarrenberger's work of the early 1920s. Paintings such as Old Men Going for a Walk (1922) adopt a deliberately naive approach to composition and the depiction of the figures. By 1924, when Schnarrenberger painted The Friends, his work fully exemplified the New Objectivity style in its sharp-edged, dispassionate rendering of a prosaic contemporary scene. According to art historian Sergiusz Michalski, "Schnarrenberger almost demonstratively refrains from portraying an emotional link between the persons in the picture."

In 1925 Schnarrenberger's paintings were included in the Neue Sachlichkeit ("New Objectivity") exhibition organized by Gustav Friedrich Hartlaub at the Kunsthalle in Mannheim.

By 1929, Schnarrenberger had begun to paint in a looser style. His work met with official disfavor during the Nazi era: In 1933 he was dismissed from his teaching job, and in 1937 he was declared a degenerate artist. From 1938 until 1947 he lived in Lenzkirch. In 1947 he regained his position as a professor the Karlsruhe Academy, and he relocated to Karlsruhe in 1948. In 1955 he began exhibiting with the Baden-Wurttemberg Federation of Artists. He was awarded the Hans Thoma State Prize in 1962.

Schnarrenberger died in Karlsruhe in 1966.
