= Christian Schad =

German painter

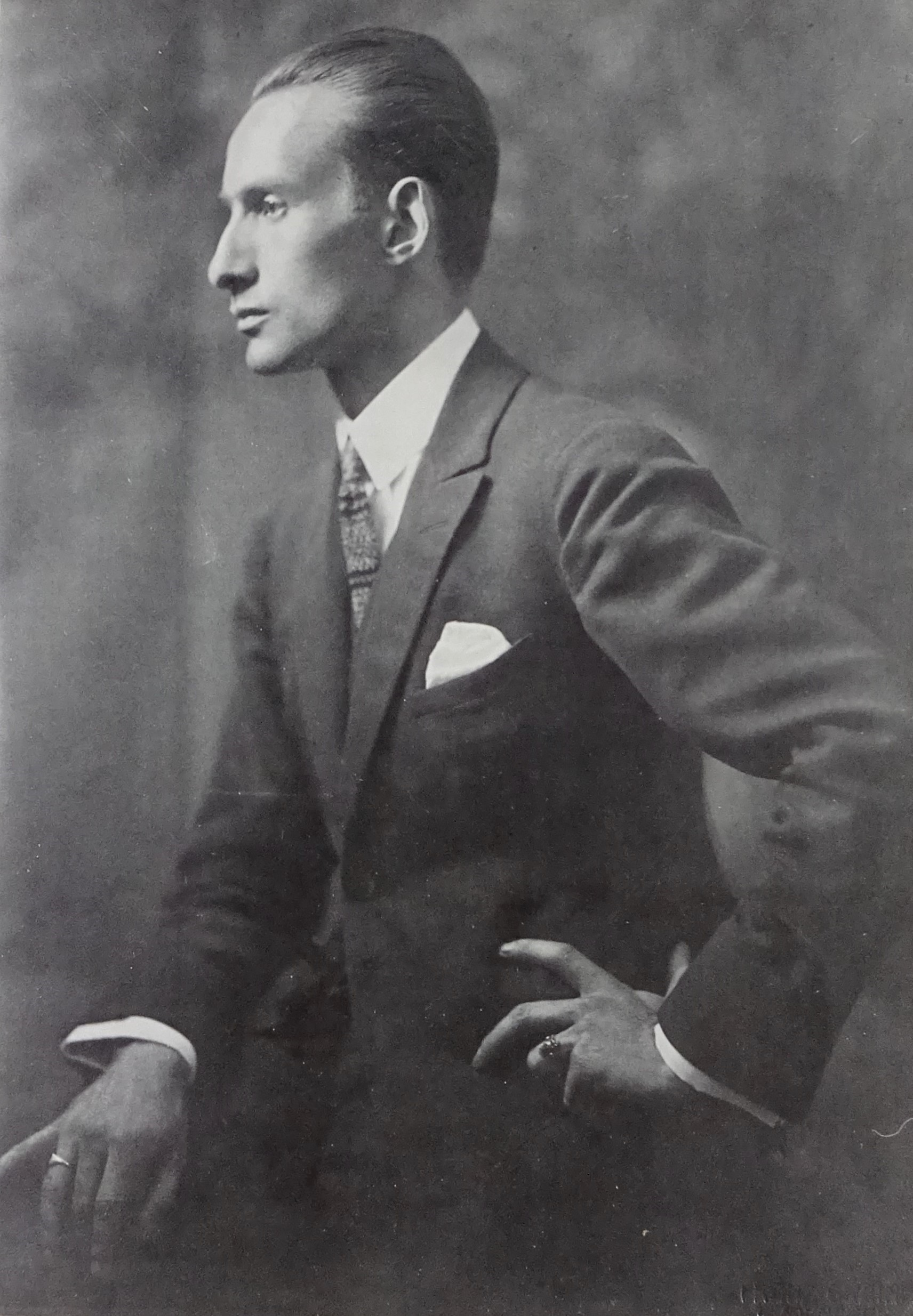
- Christian Schad in a photograph by Franz Grainer (1912)
- Born: 21 August 1894; Miesbach, Upper Bavaria, German Empire
- Died: 25 February 1982 (aged 87); Stuttgart, West Germany
- Known for: Painting, photography
- Movement: Expressionism, New Objectivity, Dada

Christian Schad (21 August 1894 – 25 February 1982) was a German painter and photographer. He was associated with the Dada and the New Objectivity movements. Schad's portraits are regarded as emblematic of the decadence of Vienna and Berlin after the First World War.

== Life ==
Schad was born in Miesbach, Upper Bavaria, to a prosperous lawyer who supported him for nearly half his life. He studied at the art academy in Munich in 1913. A "self-inflicted heart defect" allowed the pacifist to flee to Switzerland in 1915 to avoid service in World War I, settling first in Zürich sharing his apartment with Walter Serner, with whom he launched Sirius, a literary review. He was witness of the foundation of Dada at the Cabaret Voltaire in 1916, but he showed little interest in Dada, which he conceived as a "child of expressionism", and moved to Geneva in the same year. In 1919 he created early photograms on printing-out-paper later called Schadographs. From 1920 to 1925 he lived in Italy, mainly in Naples. Having married Marcella Arcangeli, the daughter of a Roman professor, he settled in Naples where he attended painting and drawing courses at the art academy. In 1927 the family emigrated to Vienna. His paintings of this period are closely associated with the New Objectivity movement. In the late twenties, he returned to Berlin and settled there.

Schad became interested in Eastern philosophy around 1930, and his artistic production declined precipitously. After the crash of the New York stock market in 1929, Schad could no longer rely on his father's financial support, and he largely stopped painting in the early 1930s. Schad's art was not condemned by the Nazis in the same way that the work of Otto Dix, George Grosz, Max Beckmann, and many other artists of the New Objectivity movement was. In 1937, the Nazis included Schad in the Great German Art exhibition, their antidote to the Degenerate Art show. Recent research revealed that Christian Schad joined the National Socialist German Workers' Party (NSDAP) in 1933.

Schad lived in obscurity in Germany through the war and after it. After the destruction of his studio in 1943 Schad moved to Aschaffenburg. The city commissioned him to copy Matthias Grünewald's Virgin and Child (Stuppach, parish church), a project on which he worked until 1947. When his Berlin studio was destroyed in aerial bombing, his future wife Bettina saved the artworks and brought them to him to Aschaffenburg. An initially provisional arrangement turned into a stay of four decades. Schad continued to paint in the 1950s in the Magic Realist style and would return in the 1960s to experiments with photograms. Schad's reputation did not begin to recover until the 1960s, when a couple of shows in Europe dovetailed with the rise of Photorealism.

Schad died in Stuttgart on 25 February 1982.

== Work ==
According to the five volumes of catalogues raisonnés Schad's oeuvre is distinguished in five group of works: painting, photography, Schadographs, graphic works, drawing and watercolors.

=== Painting ===
Schad's works of 1915–1916 show the influence of Cubism and Futurism. During his stay in Naples in Italy in the 1920s he developed a smooth, realistic style that recalls the clarity he admired in the paintings of Raphael. Upon returning to Berlin in 1927 he painted some of the most significant works of the New Objectivity. They are characterized by "an artistic perception so sharp that it seems to cut beneath the skin", according to Wieland Schmied, who calls Schad the "prototypical possessor of the 'cool gaze' which distinguishes this movement from earlier forms of realism".

=== Schadographs ===
In 1919, while living in Geneva, Schad created photograms by exposing flat objects and detritus on printing-out paper in a copy frame to the sun. His friend Walter Serner was excited about the disruptive power of the depicted negative shadows and considered the tiny paper works as an "intrusion of pure technics into art". Schad offered these "composition photographiques" for publication among others to Tristan Tzara, who finally published in March 1920 a reproduction in the Dadaphone, the seventh edition of his Dada magazine. The reproduction entitled ARP et VAL SERNER dans le crocodarium royal de Londres precedes the publication of similar approaches by Man Ray and László Moholy-Nagy at least by two years. It was more than ten years before another of these works by Schad was published as "collage photographique" in George Hugnet's essay on Dada in 1932. Today the name Schadograph is established, which was introduced by Tristan Tzara for his courtesy in 1937 for the exhibition Fantastic Art, Dada at the Museum of Modern Art in New York lending 7 Schadographs and one woodcut by Schad.

In 1919 or 1920 Schad sent all 28 original exemplars known today to Tristan Tzara, who never returned them and did not inform Schad either about succeeding exhibition activities as at the MoMA in 1937 and later. In the mid-1950s the Frankfurt-based art critic Godo Remshardt turned Schad's attention to his forgotten works. In 1960 he was approached by Helmut Gernsheim to provide a remake of his early Schadographs, which was published in 1962 as "replika" in his book Creative Photography. As printing-out paper was not available at that time Schad had to switch from the sun to the dark room creating the replikas on developing paper. He realized numerous of these late Schadographs among other for an album in 1978 dedicated to Aloysius Bertrand's poetical prose Gaspard de la Nuit.

== Recognition ==
Schad's works are now part of the collections of, among others, the Museum of Modern Art, New York; the Tate, London; and the Neue Nationalgalerie, Berlin. The first retrospective dedicated to him in the United States was held at the Neue Galerie, New York, in 2003. In 2002 Schad's second wife Bettina founded the Christian Schad Foundation in Aschaffenburg. The estate consist of over 3,200 works, which are exhibited in a changing selection and in a breadth that is unique worldwide at the Christian Schad Museum in Aschaffenburg, which was planned to open in 2018 and was finally inaugurated in June 2022.

== See also ==
- Otto Dix
- George Grosz
- Rudolf Schlichter
- Karl Hubbuch
