= Erwin Spuler =

German sculptor

- Born: 22 March 1906; Augsburg, Germany
- Died: 8 April 1964 (aged 58); Cagnes-sur-Mer, France
- Occupation: Sculptor

Erwin Spuler (22 March 1906 – 8 April 1964) was a German ceramist, painter, and sculptor. He was born in Augsburg. He studied art in Stuttgart in 1922–1923. From 1924 to 1930 he studied in Karlsruhe where his teachers included Georg Scholz and Karl Hubbuch. In 1930 he co-founded the artists' magazine Zakpo, together with Hubbuch and several other artists. The cover of the inaugural issue was a lithograph by Spuler depicting a fantastic creature standing astride a river that runs through a city.

From 1931 until his death, Spuler worked at the Majolika Manufactory in Karlsruhe. In 1933 he began his photographic series 120 variationen über ein Gesicht ("120 Variations on a Face"). Around 1933–1935 he traveled to Berlin with Hubbuch.

Spuler's work was part of the sculpture event in the art competition at the 1936 Summer Olympics.

In 1939 Spuler married Elisabeth Holzwarth. During 1939–1941 he worked as a design and graphics freelancer for UFA-Film in Berlin. He was drafted into the Wehrmacht in 1942, but was dismissed in 1943 for ill health.

His graphic works after World War II were increasingly abstract, and often suggested images of bombed cities.

Spuler died in Cagnes-sur-Mer, France, on 7 April 1964.
