= Wilhelm Heise =

German painter

Wilhelm Heise (May 19, 1892 – September 17, 1965) was a German painter associated with the New Objectivity.

== Biography ==
He was born in Wiesbaden. He began his artistic training in 1912, first in Kassel under H. Olde and later in Weimar.

In 1918, he relocated to Munich. He earned a living by painting clocks, for which he developed a meticulous technique. In 1925, he participated in the Neue Sachlichkeit (New Objectivity) exhibition in Mannheim which brought together many leading "post-expressionist" artists, including George Grosz, Otto Dix, Max Beckmann, and Georg Scholz.

His painted self-portrait entitled Fading Spring (1926) is representative of his style. In it, the artist is seated at a worktable covered with precisely painted tools, machine parts, and plants. "An inexplicable sense of threat exudes from the plants and objects bathed in gleaming light", according to Sergiusz Michalski, who compares Heise's fixation on natural details to the Pre-Raphaelites.

In 1929, Heise was awarded a scholarship to the Villa Massimo in Rome.

Unlike many of the New Objectivity artists, Heise was not declared a degenerate artist or otherwise persecuted by the Nazis.

Heise won the Nuremberg Dürer Prize in 1937. From 1937 to 1943, he was a professor in Königsberg and Frankfurt. From 1953 to 1958, he was a lecturer at the Munich Academy of Fine Arts. He died in Munich in 1965.
