= Karlheinz Bux =

German artist (born 1952)

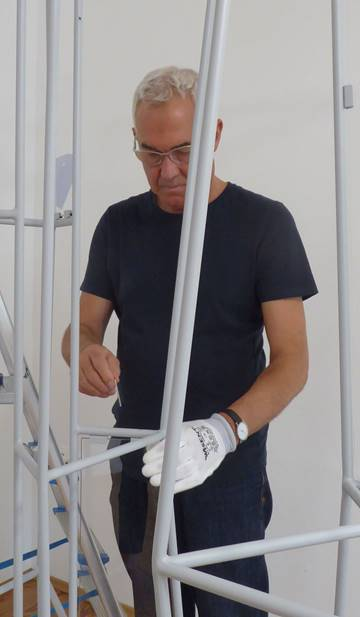
- Karlheinz Bux, 2018
- Born: 1952 (age 73–74); Ulm, West Germany
- Website: karlheinzbux.de

Karlheinz Bux (born 1952 in Ulm, West Germany) is a German artist concentrating on drawing and sculpture works.

== Career ==
The central pictorial theme of Karlheinz Bux's artistic practice is the line. Clarity, complexity and emblematic quality define his sculptures and mural reliefs which are made out of steel, bronze and wood. His drawings are executed on transparent materials such as glass and polymer foils, with photographic templates constituting the basis of his glass and foil works, that are altered by superimposition and linear treatment. Thereby, a multi-layered image reality is created, that allows numerous interpretations from the viewer, with the exploration of the peripheral areas of reality being central to his artistic practice.

Karlheinz Bux started his artistic career at State Academy of Fine Arts Karlsruhe (1972–1977). Various scholarships brought him to Paris (1986/87 and 1992) and Basel (2004/05). He created art-in-architecture projects among others in the cities of Radolfzell (1995, mural relief, steel 780/110/5 cm) and in Karlsruhe (2005, Lineamento Verticale, steel sculpture, 18m height). At the invitation of Center for Art and Media Karlsruhe, he and the artist Michaela Kölmel produced a room installation dedicated to the topic of light (Multimediale 2, 1991). As visiting professor, Karlheinz Bux taught drawing at the University of Pforzheim (1994–95) and principles of design at University of Mainz (2007–08). His works can be found in many notable European museums and private collections, among others at Kunsthalle Karlsruhe and the Würth Collection.

== Works ==
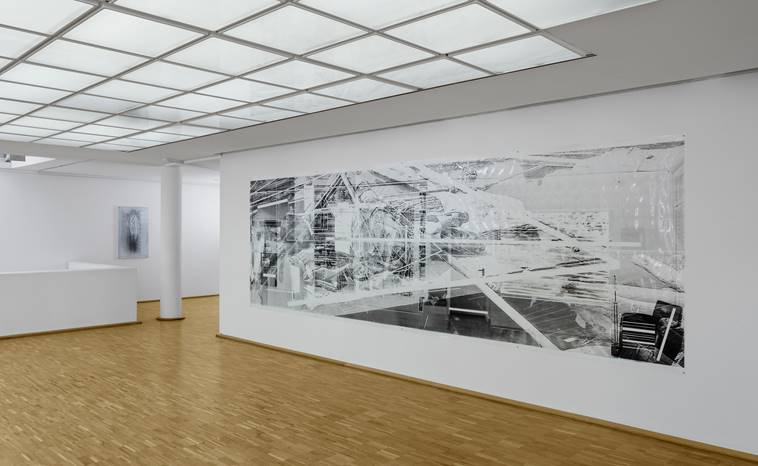
Städische Galerie Tuttlingen 2018

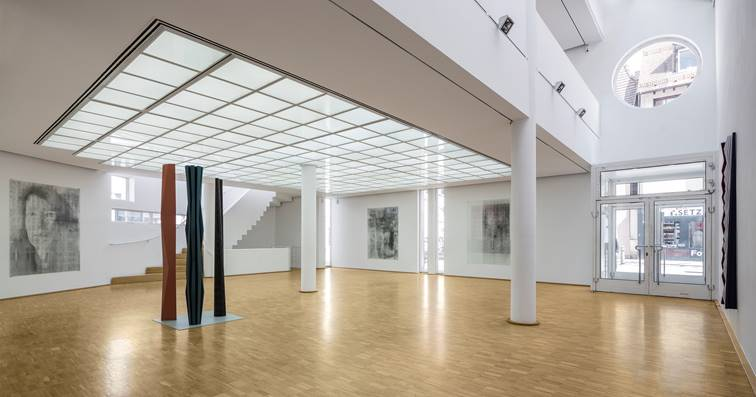
Städtische Galerie Tuttlingen 2018

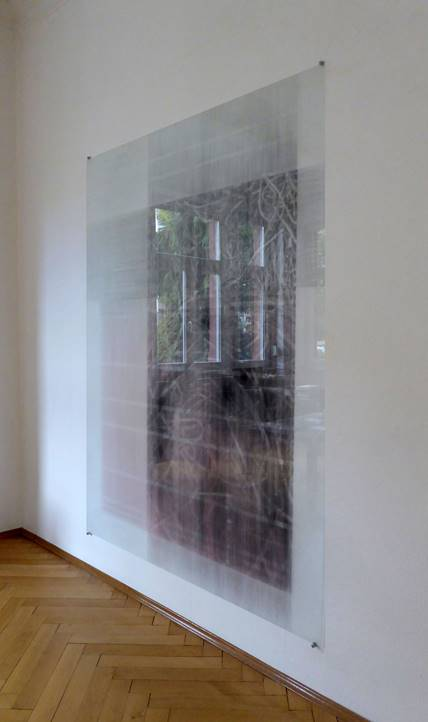
Galerie Rottloff Karlsruhe, 2018

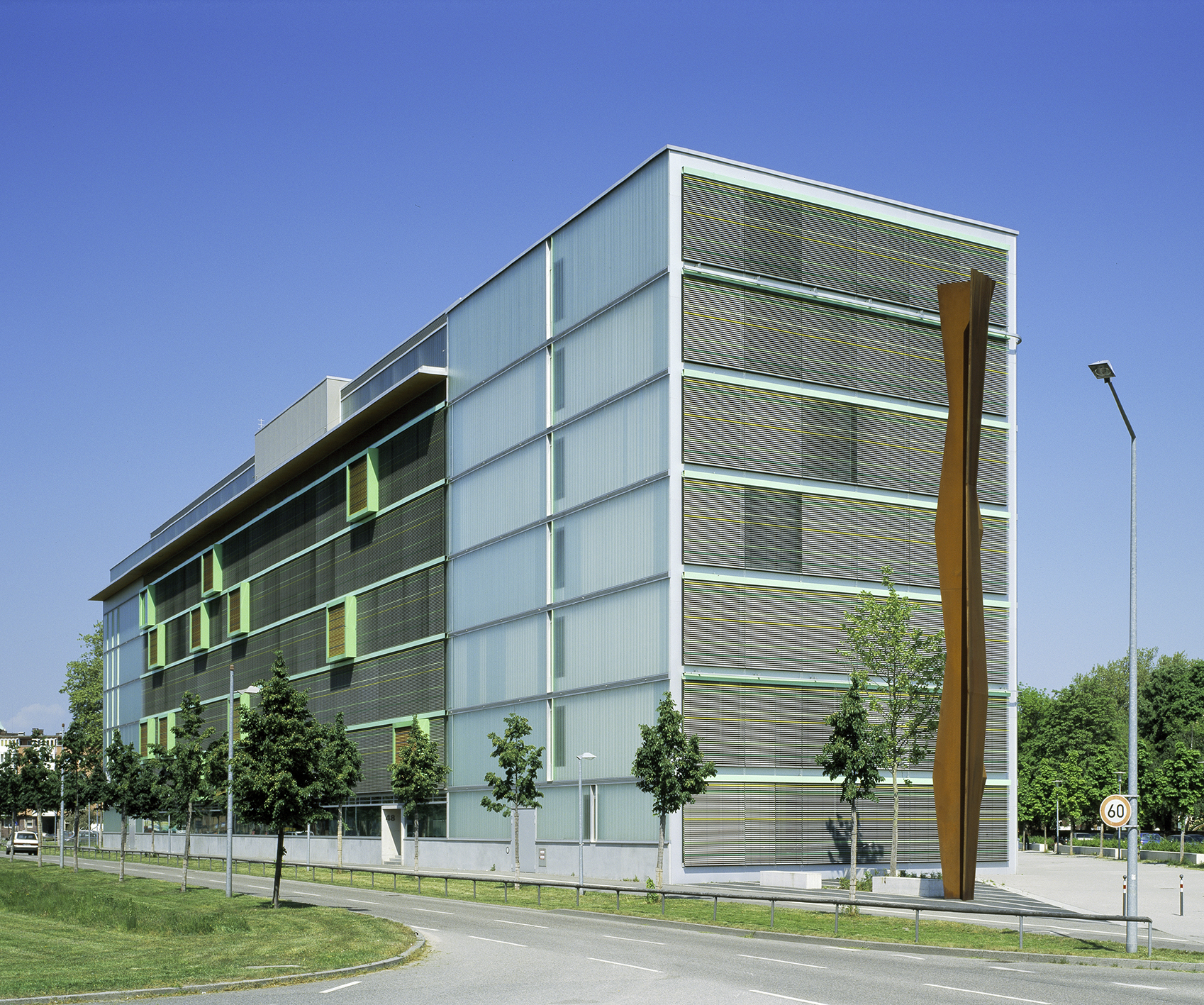
Lineamento Verticale, Karlsruhe, 2005

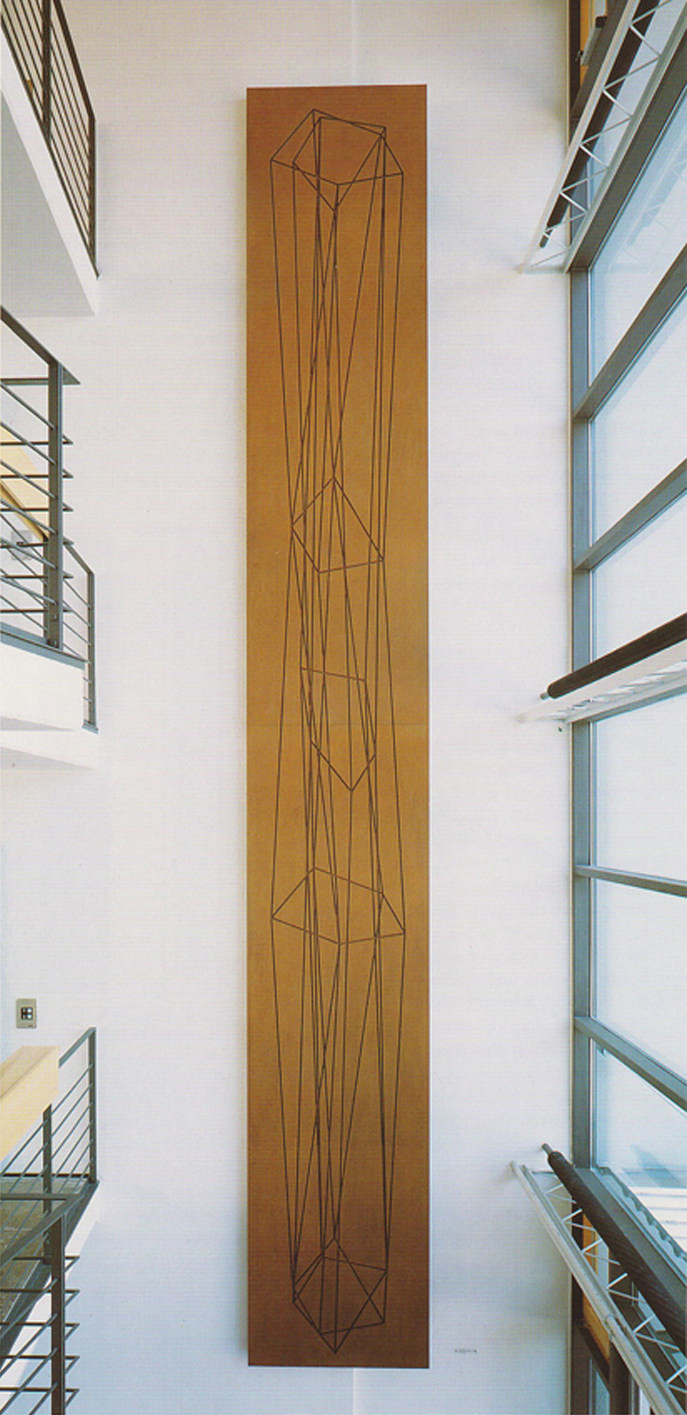
Stahlrelief Radolfzell, 1995

== Solo exhibitions ==
- 2018 - Linie, Galerie Rottloff Karlsruhe
- 2018 - FUX, Luis Leu Karlsruhe (w. Sabine Funke)
- 2018 - über Linie..., Städtische Galerie Tuttlingen
- 2017 - Museum für aktuelle Kunst - Sammlung Hurrle Durbach (w. R.Nepita)
- 2016 - Tiefe Gründe, Galerie Rottloff Karlsruhe
- 2014 - Schläfer, Galerie Rottloff Karlsruhe
- 2010 - Der Radar des Zeichners, Kunstverein Rastatt
- 2005 - Ississippi, Fondation Bartels Basel
- 1992 - Gesellschaft der Freunde junger Kunst, Baden-Baden
- 1985 - studio f, Ulm
- 1984 - Institut Unzeit, Berlin
- 1978 - Ulmer Museum (Studio), Ulm
- 1977 - Werkstatt Galerie, Vienna

== Group exhibitions ==
- 2019 - die erde und ihre schraffur im prioritätenstreit, Kunstverein Pforzheim
- 2018 - Vertikal, GKG Bonn
- 2011 - Waldeslust, Kunsthalle Würth Schwäbisch Hall
- 2008 - Modelle – Materialisierung von Konzepten, Deutscher Künstlerbund Berlin
- 2004 - Kunst seit 1960, Staatliche Kunsthalle Karlsruhe
- 2001 - Retour de Paris, Schloss Solitude Stuttgart
- 1996 - Zeichnen, Germanisches Nationalmuseum Nürnberg
- 1993 - Kunst der Neunziger Jahre, Badischer Kunstverein Karlsruhe
- 1991 - MultiMediale 2, ZKM Karlsruhe
- 1987 - Divergences-Convergences, Goethe Institute Paris und Lyon

== Publications ==
- Künstlerbund Baden-Württemberg (ed.), Was bleibt, Freiburg, 2015
- Kei Müller-Jensen, Schläfer, Galerie Rottloff, Karlsruhe, 2014
- Fondation Bartels (ed.), Der Fluss unbekümmert, Basel, 2014
- Kunsthalle Würth (ed.), Waldeslust, Schwäbisch Hall, 2011
- Michael Hübl, Der Radar des Zeichners, Karlsruhe, 2011
- Karlheinz Bux (ed.), Lineamento Verticale, Karlsruhe, 2006
- Fondation Bartels (ed.), Ississippi – Baselzeichnungen, Basel, 2005
- Staatliche Kunsthalle (ed.), Kunst seit 1960, Karlsruhe, 2004
- Dirk Teuber, Werke im öffentlichen Raum, Karlsruhe, 1996
- Dirk Teuber, Skulptur-Zeichnung, Galerie Rottloff, Karlsruhe, 1995
- Nike Bätzner, Gesellschaft der Freunde junger Kunst, Baden-Baden, 1992
- Michael Hübl, Rauminstallation/Waschstände, MultiMediale 2, Karlsruhe, 1992
- ZKM (ed.), MultiMediale 2, Karlsruhe, 1991
- Goethe Institut (ed.), Divergences-Convergences, Paris, 1986
- Thomas Wulffen, Kunstforum International, Band 77/78, 1985
