= Richard Phillips (American painter) =

American artist

- Born: 1962 (age 63–64); Marblehead, Massachusetts
- Education: Massachusetts College of Art and Design (BFA, 1984); Yale School of Art (MFA, 1986)
- Known for: photo-realistic painting

Richard Phillips (born 1962) is an American artist. He is known for large-scale paintings based on pornographic photographs of women. He paints in a photo-realistic or hyper-realistic style.

== Early life and education ==
Phillips was born in Marblehead, Massachusetts. In 1984, he received a Bachelor of Fine Arts in painting from Massachusetts College of Art and Design and in 1986, he received a Master of Fine Arts in painting from Yale School of Art.

== Career ==
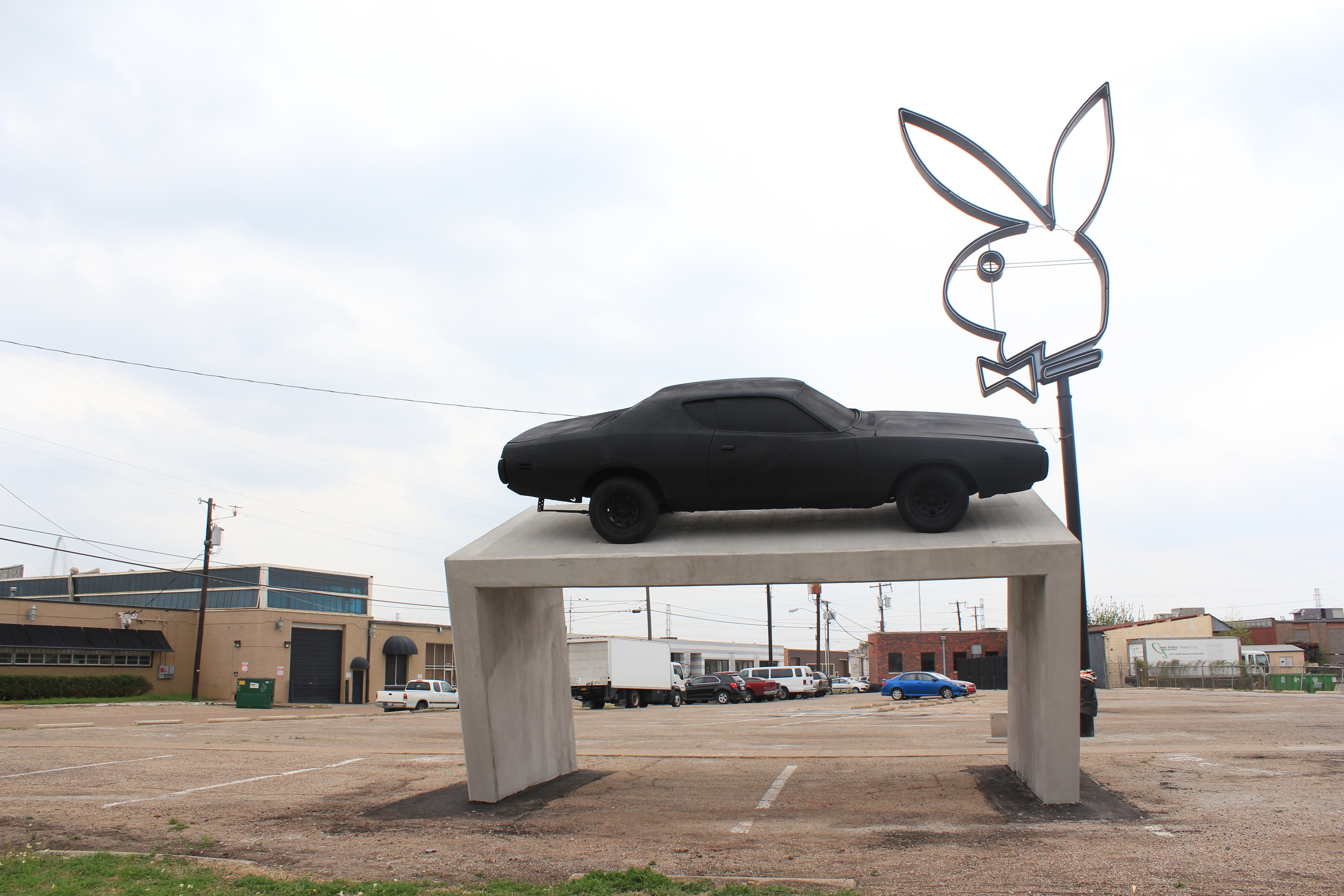
Playboy Marfa sculpture (2014)

In the 1990s, Phillips worked at the Guggenheim Museum as an art handler.

In 2008, a version of his painting Spectrum was included on Gossip Girl.

In May-June 2010, his works were featured in the Swiss Institute Contemporary Art New York along with works by Adolf Dietrich.

In 2011, Phillips created short films starring Lindsay Lohan and Sasha Grey for the Gagosian Gallery.

In 2012, he debuted another short film titled First Point, starring Lindsay Lohan, and scored by Thomas Bangalter, at Art Basel in Switzerland.

In 2013, he created a Sasha Grey portrait for the Frieze Art Fair.

In 2013, he collaborated with Playboy magazine to create a roadside installation near Marfa, Texas; he mounted a black-painted 1970s muscle car on an inclined concrete plinth beside a large symbol from the magazine.

In 2014, Phillips was featured at Dallas Contemporary.

== Personal life ==
Phillips lives in New York City. He has a studio in the Starrett–Lehigh Building.

== Bibliography ==
- Phillips, Richard. Painting and Misappropriation (PDF). Swiss Institute Contemporary Art New York.
