= Adolf Dietrich =

Swiss laborer and artist

- Born: Adolf Dietrich; November 9, 1877; Berlingen
- Died: June 4, 1957 (aged 79); Berlingen
- Education: None
- Known for: Painting, graphic arts
- Movement: Neue Sachlichkeit, Naïve art

Adolf Dietrich (November 9, 1877 – June 4, 1957) was a Swiss laborer and artist associated with New Objectivity. He is one of the most renowned Swiss naïve artists and painters of the 20th century.

== Biography ==
Adolf Dietrich was born to poor farmers in the canton of Thurgau as the youngest of 7 children. Upon discovering his exceptional graphical talents, his schoolteacher suggested that he become a lithographer. His parents, however, refused since he was needed as a farmhand.

Dietrich lived in the house of his parents, as a bachelor, for the rest of his life. Because the small farm provided little income, he had to work as a homemaker and as a day laborer in a local textile mill and in the woods. He was only free to engage in drawing and painting on Sundays. His first sketchbook dates to 1896, his first paintings to 1900. He created his works without any training or examples; but he did heed the advice of passing landscape painters to trust in his powers of observation.

For years, Dietrich tried without success to have his works shown in public. After his works were first shown in Konstanz in 1913, he received some recognition in Germany, where he was associated with the Neue Sachlichkeit movement and called the "German Rousseau". Around 1916, he was discovered by art dealer Herbert Tannenbaum, who represented Dietrich until Tannenbaum fled Germany in 1937 due to the rise of the Nazi Party. In 1924, Dietrich was able to cease homemaking due to the income provided by the sale of his works in Germany.

Swiss museums and galleries slowly grew interested in Dietrich, and his international breakthrough came in 1937–1938, when the exposition Les maîtres populaires de la réalité in Paris and Zürich and an exhibition at the Museum of Modern Art in New York City fêted him as the principal representative of naïve art.

Dietrich retained his modest lifestyle in the face of sudden fame and demand for his works. However, he was industrious in marketing the output of the "master painter of Berlingen", as he then called himself.

== Works ==
The motives of Dietrich's works are limited to his immediate surroundings in Berlingen, and include rural landscapes, animals, people and still lifes. He created all of his works at home in his room, using pencil sketches, self-made photographs, stuffed animals and books as models. Drawing on his powers of observation, Dietrich imbued his still life and animal paintings with a strong sense of materiality and executed them with what was for an untrained painter an exceptional precision.

At times, he used, upon his clients' wishes, cardboard stencils for the serial reproduction of particularly popular motifs. Only Dietrich's few late works prior to his death in 1957 indicated any stylistic development. The artistic merits of Dietrich's works are found in his strong intuitive sense of color, which intensifies the impact of his brightly colored works, and in his outstanding power of observation, which allowed him to combine precision with great attentiveness of his subjects.

Some of Dietrich's works are exhibited in the Kunstmuseum Winterthur, the Museum zu Allerheiligen in Schaffhausen, the Kunsthaus Zürich and the Zander Collection in Cologne. In May–June 2010, his works were featured in the Swiss Institute Contemporary Art New York along with works by Richard Phillips.

=== Resales ===
Painting	Creation date	Sale date	Sale price	Ref(s).
Herbstgruss	1922	2 December 2007	CHF192,000	
Frühling am Untersee	1919	2 December 2007	CHF192,000	
Eisvogel in Winterlandschaft	1953	15 June 2008	CHF156,000	
Buchfink auf kahlem Ast	1954	30 November 2008	CHF12,780	
Marder	1954	20 March 2011	CHF156,000	

== Exhibitions (selection) ==
- Otto Dix – Adolf Dietrich. Two Painters on Lake Constance, Museum zu Allerheiligen (5.4.–17.8.2025)
- The New Objectivity. A Centennial, Kunsthalle Mannheim (22.11.2024–9.3.2025)
- Which Modernism? In- and Outsiders of the Avant-Garde, Sprengel Museum Hannover (6.5.–17.9.2023), Kunstsammlungen Chemnitz (22.10.2023–14.1.2024)
- Schall und Rauch. Die wilden Zwanziger, Kunsthaus Zürich (3.7.–11.10..2020)
- Magritte, Dietrich, Rousseau. Visionäre Sachlichkeit, Kunsthaus Zürich (8.3.–8.7.2018)
- Adolf Dietrich. Mondschein über dem See, Kunstmuseum Thurgau (27.8.–17.12.2017)
- Neu. Sachlich. Schweiz. Malerei der Neuen Sachlichkeit in der Schweiz, Museum Oskar Reinhart (2.9.2017–14.1.2018)
- 27 Artists. 209 Works, Zander Collection (20.3.2016–29.1.2017)
- Adolf Dietrich / Richard Phillips. Painting and Misappropriation, Swiss Institute Contemporary Art New York (7.5.–26.6.2010), Kunstmuseum Thurgau (29.5.–28.8.11)
- Naive Art: In Quest of Lost Paradise, Kunst Haus Wien (4.10.2001–3.2.2002), Reiss-Museum (23.2.–30.6.2002), Kunsthalle Recklinghausen (28.7.–13.10.2002)
- Adolf Dietrich und die Neue Sachlichkeit in Deutschland, Kunstmuseum Winterthur (4.9.–20.11.1994), State Museum for Art and Cultural History (4.12.1994–5.2.1995)
- Die Kunst der Naiven, Haus der Kunst (1.11.1974–12.1.1975), Kunsthaus Zürich (25.1.–31.3.1975)
- Masters of Popular Painting: Modern Primitives of Europe and America, Museum of Modern Art (27.4.–24.7.1938)
- Adolf Dietrich, Das Kunsthaus Mannheim (4.–5.1922)

== Bibliography ==
- Zander, Susanne, ed. (2023). 26 Artists. Works from the Zander Collection. Cologne: Verlag der Buchhandlung Walther und Franz König. ISBN 978-3753303819.
- Landert, Markus, ed. (2017). Adolf Dietrich. Der Zeichner malt (in German). Zurich.
- Rüfenacht, Andreas (2025). Otto Dix – Adolf Dietrich (in German). Berlin: Deutscher Kunstverlag. ISBN 978-3-422-80290-2.
