= Hans Mertens =

German painter

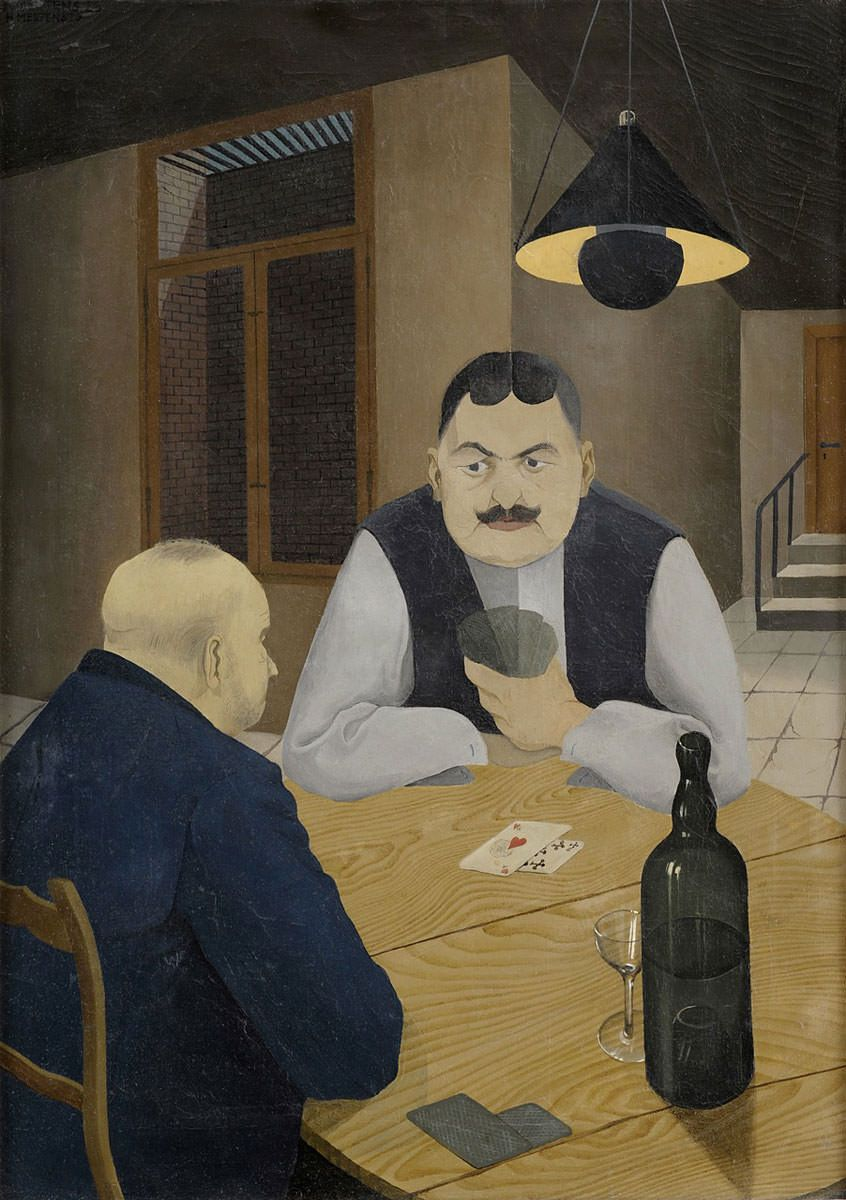
Card Players, 1926

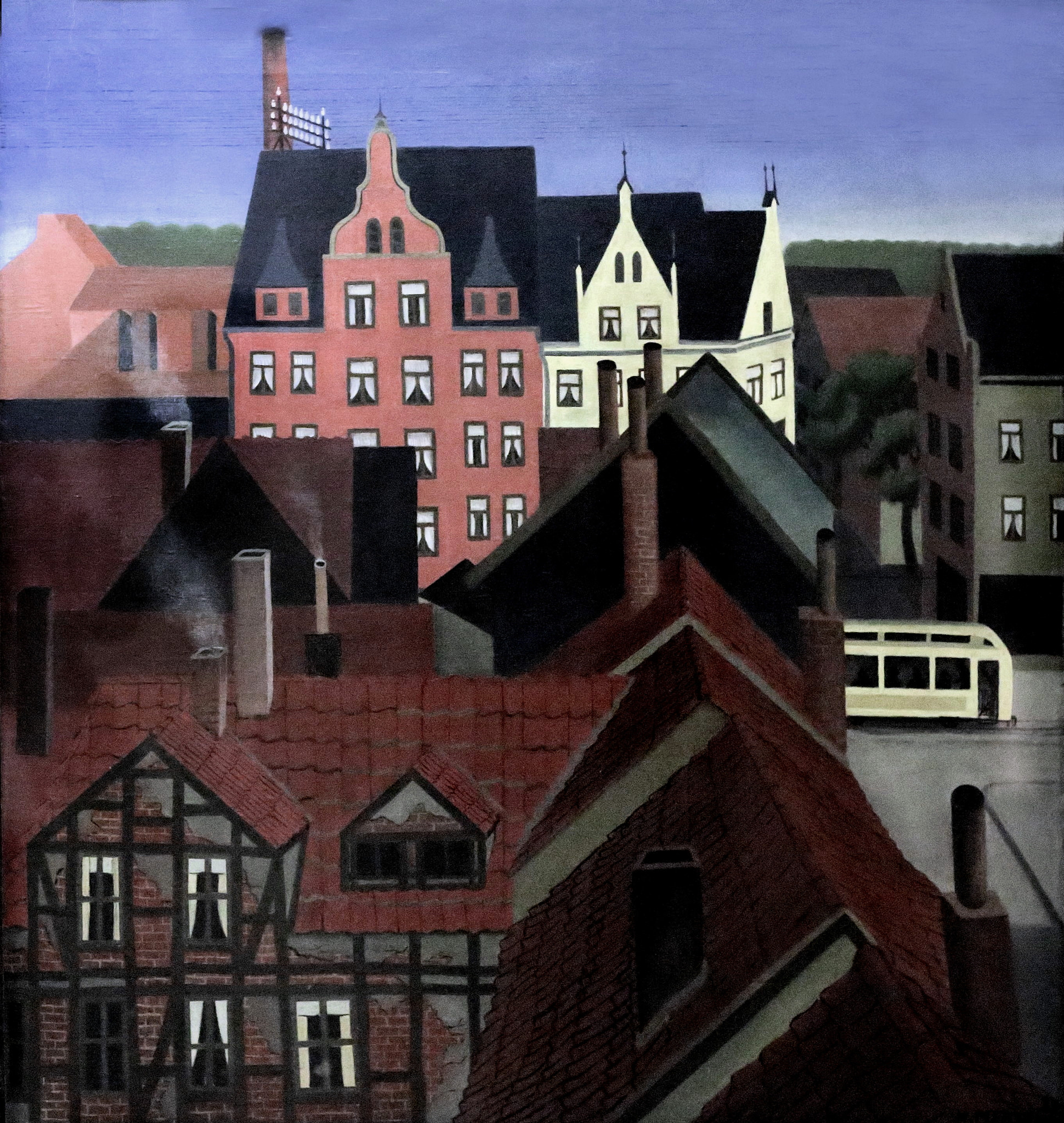
Buildings in Linden. View onto the Limmerstrasse, 1927

Hans Mertens (January 2, 1906 – August 18, 1944) was a German painter associated with the New Objectivity.

Mertens was born in Hanover and had his artistic training there at the School of Arts and Crafts during 1925–26. He found work as a restorer, first in the Provinzialmuseum and then in the Kestner-Museum in Hanover. He was a friend of Carl Buchheister and Kurt Schwitters.

During the 1920s, Mertens painted still lifes, landscapes, and figurative subjects in a controlled style. A Constructivist tendency is visible in his painting Card Players (1926): the imposition of geometric order onto organic forms causes the man's hair part, shirtfront, and cards to align with an edge of a background wall. Still Life with Household Articles (1928) is typical of much New Objectivity painting in its dispassionate rendering of mundane objects.

Mertens remained dependent on work as a commercial artist to make a living. In 1933 he married Hanna Vogel. In 1939 he was called to military service. Many of his works were destroyed when his studio was bombed by Allied forces in 1943. In 1944 Mertens was killed in action at Albi.
