= State Academy of Fine Arts Karlsruhe =

Art academy in Karlsruhe, Germany

Coordinates: 49°00′52″N 8°23′14″E

- Staatliche Akademie der Bildenden Künste Karlsruhe
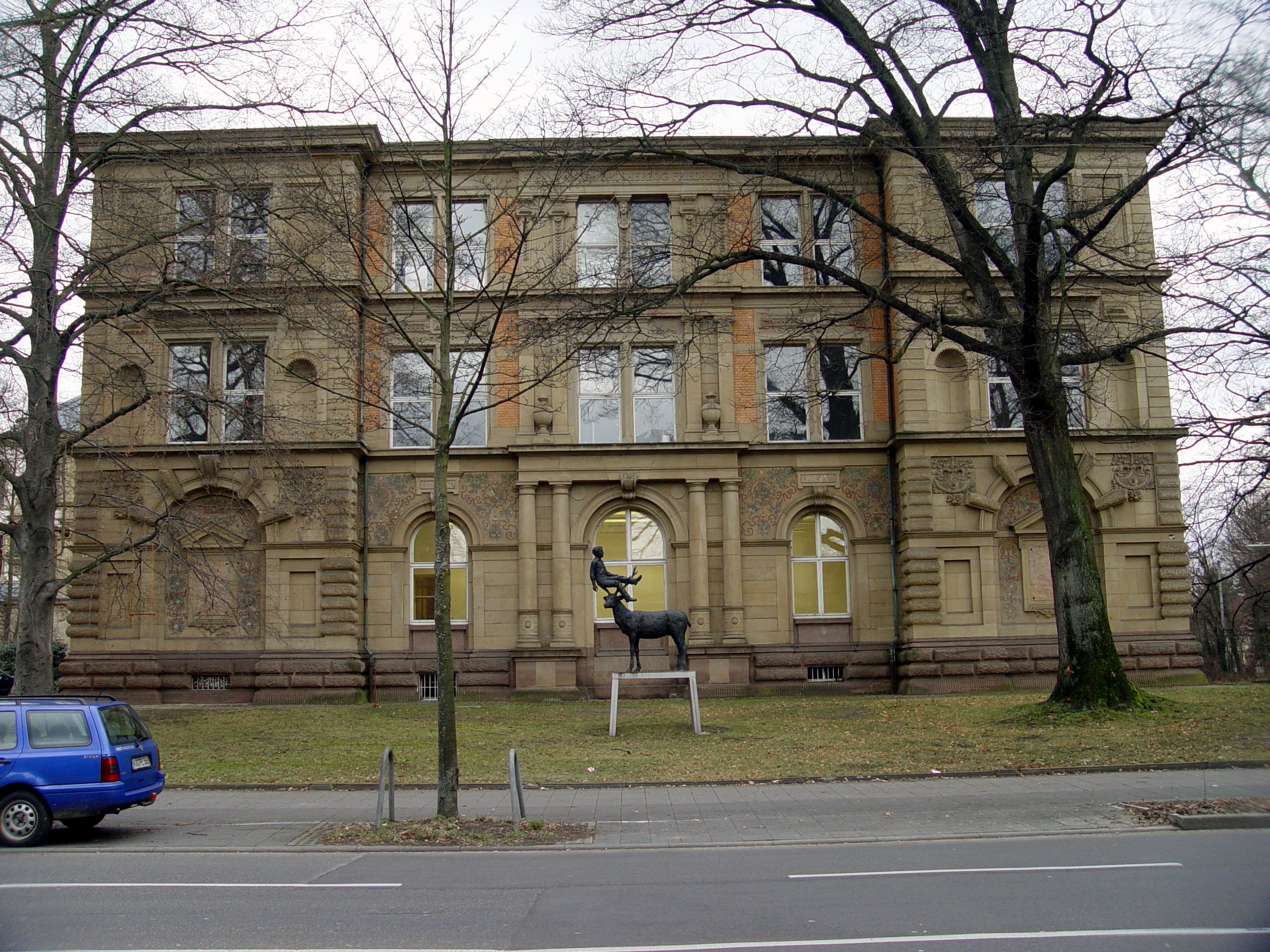
- Main building of the Academy of Fine Arts, Karlsruhe
- Established: 1854
- Founder: Frederick I, Grand Duke of Baden
- Rector: Marcel van Eeden
- Students: approx. 300 (in 2021)
- Location: Karlsruhe, Baden-Württemberg, Germany
- Website: www.kunstakademie-karlsruhe.de

The State Academy of Fine Arts Karlsruhe or Staatliche Akademie der Bildenden Künste Karlsruhe is an academy of arts in Karlsruhe, in Baden-Württemberg in south-western Germany.

== History ==
The Academy was founded in 1854 by Frederick I, Grand Duke of Baden, with the landscape painter Johann Wilhelm Schirmer as the first director.

During the Nazi regime, several artists were fired from their teaching positions, due to their art being considered "degenerate". These include, for example, Willhelm Schnarrenberger, Georg Scholz, and Karl Hubbuch - all of whom were associated with the New Objectivity movement.

After the second world war, the academy re-opened first in 1947 and Schnarrenberger and Hubbuch eventually regained their positions. Post-war heads of the academy include art historian Oskar Gehring (1947/48), Otto Haupt (architect) (1949–1956), art historian Kurt Martin (1956/57), painter Otto Laible (1957/58), and painter Hans Gaensslen (1958–1963). The latter became the first elected rector as, in 1961, policy was changed from ministry-appointed directors to rectors elected by all professors in 4 year intervals.

He was followed by Hans Kindermann (sculptor) (1963–1971), visual artist Harry Kögler (1971–1976), Klaus Arnold (painter) (1976–1988), art historian Andreas Franzke (1988–2000), painter Erwin Gross(2000–2012), Ernst Caramelle (2012–2018), and sculptor Harald Klingelhöller (2018–2021).

Since October 2021 it is led by rector and Dutch graphic artist Marcel van Eeden and has about 300 students (2016: 297 according to city statistics report, 2021: "just over 300" according to own report).

The Kalinowski room in the main building, where students can self-organize exhibitions, is named after the former professor Horst Egon Kalinowski who died in 2013. He also dedicated his estate to a foundation granting awards to graduates of the academy, now referred to as the Kalinowski-Preis ("Kalinowski-prize").

== Location ==
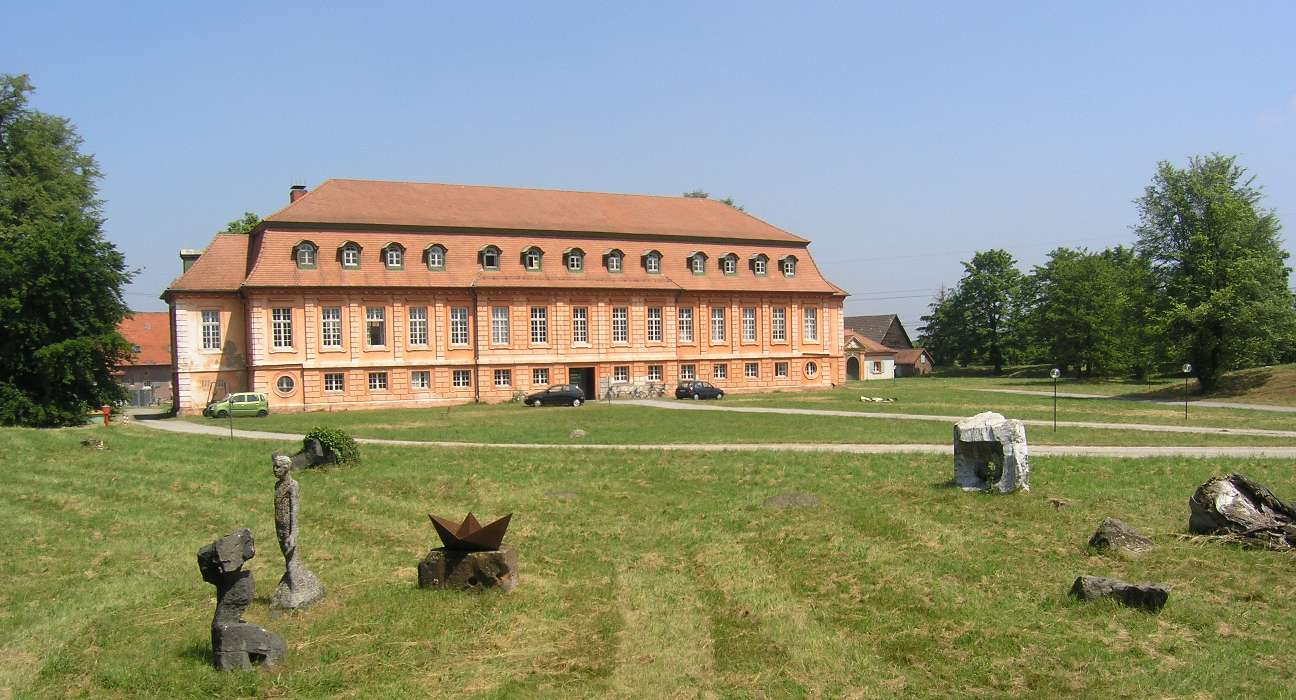
Castle Scheibenhardt

The Academy is split between several buildings in Karlsruhe, including the castle of the court estate Scheibenhardt, which is at the Southern edge of Karlsruhe and used to be a hunting lodge. The castle is in need of general renovation, however, as of 2022 it is said to not start before 2025.

The other buildings, concentrated in Western Karlsruhe, are the main building, administration, Villa Schönleber, and Bildhauergarten ("sculptor's garden").

== Curriculum ==
Curriculum at the Academy includes Fine Art (Freie Kunst), differentiating mainly between sculpture and painting/graphics, as well as art teacher education for one of several German secondary school types ("gymnasium"), called Lehramt mit Bildender Kunst.

Those studying to become teachers are required to choose a second subject in addition to art that they wish to teach in school, which can be studied at the partner universities KIT in Karlsruhe, University of Mannheim or University of Heidelberg. It is standard practice for teachers in Germany to usually know and teach at least two subjects.

Deviating from this, teacher trainees at the academy may choose to intensify their artistic studies to become exclusive art teachers with Intermediales Gestalten (IMG for short, literally translated as "intermediate designing") as their second subject. This consists of additional, specialized courses in architecture at the KIT as well as seminars about subjects such as performance or digital art at the art academy itself.

According to the year report for the 2021/2022 semester, 118 students were studying to become art teachers at the time, of which 25 had IMG as their second subject.

== Notable students ==
- Erwin Aichele (1887–1974)
- Sonia Delaunay (1885–1979)
- Wilhelm Hempfing (1886–1948)
- Friedrich Heyser (1857–1921)
- Karl Hubbuch (1891–1979)
- Alexander Kanoldt (1881–1939)
- Michaela Kölmel 1956–2007)
- Max Laeuger (1864–1952)
- Chantal Michel (born 1968)
- Hans Thoma (1839–1924)

== Notable faculty ==
- Horst Antes (* 1936)
- Georg Baselitz (* 1938)
- Hermann Billing (1867–1946)
- Horst Egon Kalinowski
- Per Kirkeby (* 1938)
- Markus Lüpertz (* 1941)
- Georg Scholz (1890–1945)
- Emil Schumacher (1912–1999)
- Klaus Theweleit (* 1942)

== Literature ==
- Axel Heil, Harald Klingelhöller (Editors): 150 Years. The History of the Academy of Fine Arts Karlsruhe in Pictures. Die Geschichte der Kunstakademie Karlsruhe in Bildern und Texten. Swiridoff, 2004. ISBN 3-89929-045-3
- Vereinigung der Freunde der Kunstakademie Karlsruhe e.V. (Hrsg.): Festschrift zum 125-jährigen Bestehen. C.F.Müller Verlag GmbH, Karlsruhe 1979.

== See also ==
- Hochschule für Gestaltung, another art university in Karlsruhe
- Karlsruhe Institute of Technology (KIT), a mostly technical university in Karlsruhe, cooperating with the art academy
- Education in Germany
