= Michaela Kölmel =

German artist and university professor

- Born: 1956; Karlsruhe, Baden-Württemberg, West Germany
- Died: 2007 (aged 50–51); Karlsruhe, Baden-Württemberg, Germany
- Resting place: Hauptfriedhof Karlsruhe
- Education: Academy of Fine Arts, Karlsruhe

Michaela Kölmel (1956 – 2007) was a German artist and university professor from Karlsruhe. Her artistic work included drawings, sculptures, site-specific installations, and interventions in public spaces.

== Life and work ==
Kölmel studied at the State Academy of Fine Arts Karlsruhe from 1980 to 1986 under the guidance of Prof. Hiromi Akiyama and Prof. David Lauer. She received the Graduate Scholarship from the State of Baden-Württemberg, along with other scholarships, which enabled her to continue her work at the Cité Internationale des Arts in Paris in 1992. Kölmel held teaching positions at the University of Pforzheim from 1995 to 1999 and at Ahrenshoop in 2000, funded by the Kunstfonds Berlin. In 2002, she was appointed professor at the Mainz University of Applied Sciences, where she taught courses in Interior Design, Sculpture, Drawing, and Art History until her death in 2007.

== Style ==
Kölmel's work was influenced by the minimalist tradition of the 1960s, focusing on simplicity and elemental forms. Her sculptures and installations often contrasted external simplicity with complex or luminous interiors. She employed materials such as polished copper tubes, stainless steel sheets, and mirror glass to create visual and perceptual effects in her site-specific installations. Notable works include installations at the ZKM Center for Art and Media Karlsruhe (1992), Orgelhalle (1994), and Galerie Rottloff (2006).

In her drawings, Kölmel utilized unconventional materials like foil and graphite powder, creating textures and relief-like surfaces with cuts and lines rather than traditional pencil and paper.

== Collections and legacy ==
Kölmel's work is held in several public collections, including the Ministry of Science and Art of Baden-Württemberg, the Staatliche Kunsthalle Karlsruhe, the ZKM Center for Art and Media Karlsruhe, and the Städtische Galerie Karlsruhe. Additionally, her works are part of private collections such as the Museum für aktuelle Kunst - Sammlung Hurrle and the collection of Reinhold Würth.

== Gallery ==
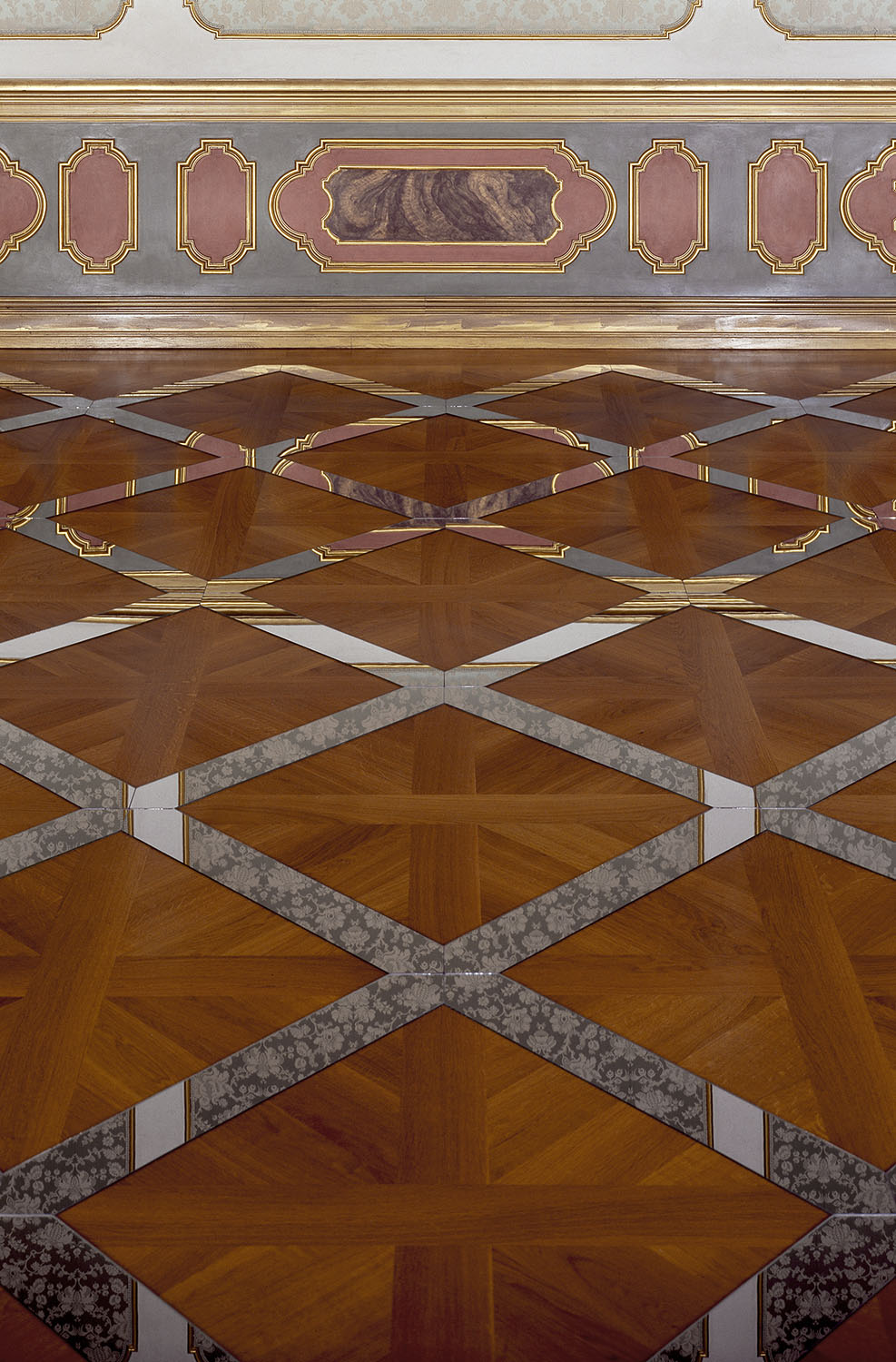
Installation, 2001 Mirror on parquet floor, approx. ca. 800/700/1 cm (Museum Ettlingen/ Castle, November 2001)

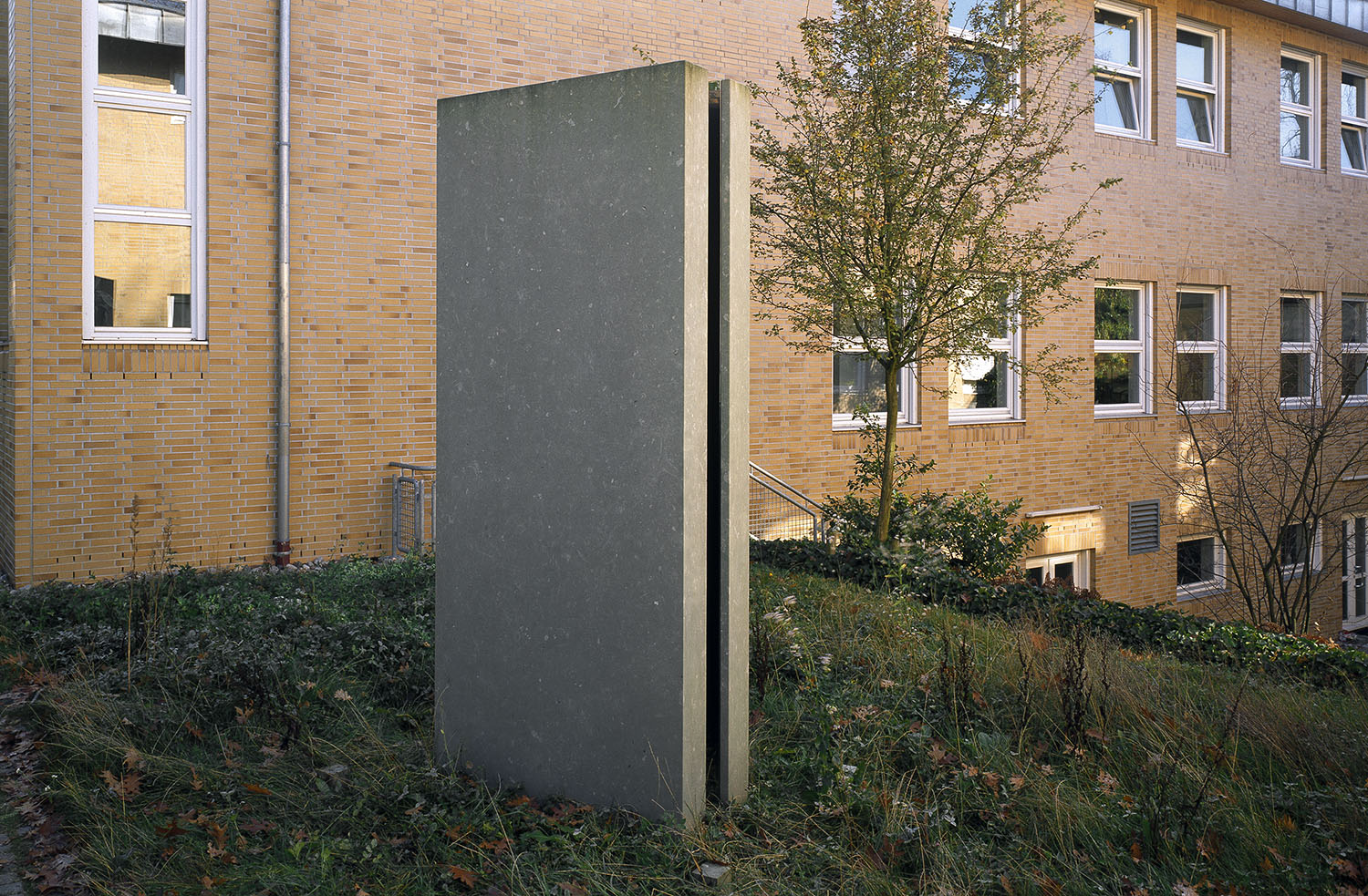
Untitled, 1991, Anroechter Dolomit/Stainless Steel, ca. 300/125/55 cm (Location: KIT, Karlsruhe)

== Selected exhibitions ==
- 2019 "LichtSchatten", Solo Show, Karlsruhe Lukaskirche
- 2012 "gestern-heute-morgen", Group Show, Kunstgebäude Stuttgart (GA)
- 2011 "Spektral - Diametral", Group Show, Städtische Galerie Karlsruhe
- 2009 Group Show, Kunstverein Augsburg,
- 2004 "Painting and sculpture since 1960", Group Show, Staatliche Kunsthalle Karlsruhe
- 2000 "Gabriele Münter Prize", Group Show, Frauenmuseum Bonn (GA)
- 1999 "Kunstmesse Düsseldorf", Solo Show, Galerie Rottloff
- 1999 "Objekte", Solo Show, Galerie Rottloff
- 1997 "Förderverein aktuelle Kunst", Solo Show, FAK Münster
- 1996 "Michaela Kölmel", Solo Show, Badischer Kunstverein Karlsruhe
- 1996 "von der Farbe zum Licht", Group Show, Staatliche Kunsthalle Karlsruhe
- 1995 Group Show, Galerie Karin Friebe Mannheim
- 1993 "Sculptura Ulm '93", Group Show, Pro Arte Ulmer Kunststiftung
- 1992 "MultiMediale 2", Group Show with Karlheinz Bux Karlheinz Bux, ZKM Karlsruhe
