= Karl Hubbuch =

German painter

- Born: 21 November 1891; Karlsruhe, German Empire
- Died: 26 December 1979 (aged 88); Karlsruhe, West Germany
- Known for: Painting, Drawing, Printmaking
- Movement: New Objectivity

Karl Hubbuch (21 November 1891 – 26 December 1979) was a German painter, printmaker, and draftsman associated with the New Objectivity.

== Life ==
Hubbuch was born in Karlsruhe and baptised in the Roman Catholic church. From 1908 to 1912, he studied art at the Karlsruhe Academy, where he formed friendships with fellow students Georg Scholz and Rudolf Schlichter. He continued his studies with Emil Orlik at the Berlin Museum of Arts and Crafts School until the First World War. From 1914 to 1918 he served in the military, where he contracted malaria. He spent the period after the war recuperating before resuming his studies in a master class at the Karlsruhe Academy. In 1924, Hubbuch was given a position as an assistant lithography instructor at the Karlsruhe Academy. He became the head of the drawing department the following year, and in 1928 he was appointed professor.

During this period, Hubbuch was much more active as a draftsman than as a painter. His drawings and prints of the early 1920s, sharply realistic in style, are highly critical of the social and economic order. A trip to Berlin in 1922—during which he met George Grosz—inspired the creation of several drawings in which Hubbuch depicted himself as an observer who reacts to the urban dynamism surrounding him. He exhibited several drawings and prints, as well as his oil painting, The Classroom, in the seminal "Neue Sachlichkeit' ("New Objectivity") exhibition at the Kunsthalle in Mannheim in 1925.

On 4 January 1928 he married Hilde (née Isay; 1905–1971) in Trier, where she was born and raised, and who had studied photography at the Bauhaus. Her likeness is recognizable in many of Hubbuch's works of the 1920s, such as Zweimal Hilde ("Hilde Twice"), painted in 1923. Hubbuch published collections of satirical drawings, and in 1930 he collaborated with Erwin Spuler and Anton Weber in publishing the critical and satirical magazine "Zakpo". As a known antifascist, Hubbuch was dismissed in 1933 from his teaching position and forbidden to paint by the Nazi authorities. Having an affair before, Hubbuch got divorced in 1933, and Hilde, being Jewish, emigrated in the same year to Vienna (till 1938) and on via London to New York, where, varying the name to Hubbuck, she made a career as a photographer. In 1940 he married Ellen Heid (née Adam-Falk), who had her daughter Myriam (b. 1932) before they met. Until 1945 he supported himself with commercial jobs which included decorating ceramics and painting clock faces.

After the war he was able to resume his post as a professor of painting at the Karlsruhe Academy of Fine Arts, where he would teach until 1957. He worked in relative obscurity during this later period, painting and drawing in a style close to expressionism. In the 1960s the revival of interest in figurative art brought new attention to his work, along with a reevaluation of the artists of the New Objectivity in general.

Because of failing eyesight he produced few works after 1970. Karl Hubbuch died in 1979 in Karlsruhe, where approximately 100 of his works are now housed in Gochsheim Castle.

== Legacy ==
In 1985 Ellen Hubbuch donated about 100 pieces of his work to the municipality of Kraichtal, shown in Gochsheim Castle, since Karl Hubbuch's parents originated from Neuenbürg, a locality of Kraichtal. His stepdaughter Myriam Hubbuch chairs the foundation "Karl-Hubbuch-Stiftung" promoting presentations and research in Karl Hubbuch's œuvre.
