= Rudolf Schlichter =

German painter

- Self-Portrait (1920)
- Born: 6 December 1890; Calw, Württemberg, German Empire
- Died: 3 May 1955 (aged 64); Munich, West Germany
- Known for: Painting, literature
- Movement: Expressionism, Dada, New Objectivity, Surrealism

Rudolf Schlichter (or Rudolph Schlichter) (December 6, 1890 – May 3, 1955) was a German painter, engraver and writer. He was one of the most important representatives of the critical-realistic style of verism within the New Objectivity movement. He also wrote some autobiographical books.

== Biography ==
=== Early life and career ===
Schlichter was born in Calw, Württemberg. He lost his father early, and grew up as the youngest of six siblings. His mother, who worked as a seamstress, was a Protestant, while his father, a professional gardener, was a Catholic. According to his fathers wish, the children were brought up as Catholics. He attended the Latin school in Calw until the sixth grade.

He started in 1904 an apprenticeship as an enamel painter at a Pforzheim factory. After that he attended the State Academy of Fine Arts Stuttgart, in Stuttgart, from 1907 to 1909. He subsequently studied at the Academy of Fine Arts, in Karlsruhe, under Hans Thoma and Wilhelm Trübner, among others, from 1910 to 1916. Already during his studies, Schlichter developed into an artist who saw himself related to contemporary bohemian ideals and in rebellion against traditional bourgeois values.

Shlichter liked to portray himself as a dandy at the time, following his role model, Oscar Wilde. Schlichter undertook various study trips to Strasbourg, in Alsace, to Italy and France, and got contacts to the underworld through fellow painter Julius Kaspar. He visited Berlin for the first time around 1910, where his brother Max Schlichter (1882–1932) was head chef at the renowned Hotel Kaiserhof. As a dandy-like flaneur through the streets of the capital, with its light and dark districts, he experienced "the uninterrupted succession of fear experiences - especially through the presence of whores, gays, criminals in these streets - (these) triggered in him a panicky "thrill" that his small-town experience and adventure potential blew up".

Because of his short-sightedness, Schlichter was initially exempt from military service during the First World War. He would eventually be deployed as a munitions driver on the Western Front, but returned from there the following year after a hunger strike done to secure an early release. In 1918 he became a member of a soldiers' council.

=== The 1920s ===
Women's' Bar (Damenkneipe) (1925). The image shows the lesbian bar Toppkeller, a basement pub located in Berlin-Schöneberg.

Schlichter had a first exhibition in 1919 in the Iwan Moos Gallery, in Karlsruhe. Shortly before the opening of the exhibition, he founded the group Rih, together with other former graduates of the Karlsruhe art school, like Wladimir von Zabotin and Georg Scholz. The artists were determined to counteract the more conservative Karlsruhe art scene with their works, which could be assigned at the time to Expressionism or Dadaism. The group made provocative statements and actions; for example, phallic symbols drawn with chalk on the walls of the house pointed the way to the exhibition space. The provocative themes of the exhibition and the new artistic language were discussed very controversially back then. In 1919, Schlichter moved to Berlin, where he joined the November Group, the Berlin Secession, the Berlin Dadaists and became politically active. A first presentation of his paintings in his brother Max's new restaurant "Schlichters" quickly made Schlichter a certain acquaintance in artistic circles in the capital, including John Heartfield and George Grosz, with whom he shared a studio at times and of which he also drew the same models.

In 1920 he had his first solo exhibition in the Berlin gallery Burchard, and he took part in the First International Dada Fair. Here the object Prussian Archangel, a soldier doll with a pig's head hanging from the ceiling, which he had created with Heartfield, caused a scandal. Arbitrators, George Grosz, Wieland Herzfelde, John Heartfield and the gallery owner Otto Burchard were charged with insulting the Reichswehr.

A major work from this period is his Dada Roof Studio, a watercolor showing an assortment of figures on an urban rooftop. Around a table sit a woman and two men in top hats. One of the men has a prosthetic hand and the other, also missing a hand, appears on closer scrutiny to be mannequin. Two other figures in gas masks may also be mannequins. A child holds a pail and a woman wearing high button shoes (for which Schlichter displayed a marked fetish) stands on a pedestal, gesturing inexplicably.

Politically, Schlichter was involved in left-wing organizations and in the communist party KPD, of which he was a member from 1919 to 1927. From around 1922 he lived with a prostitute. His circle of friends and acquaintances at the time ranged from Bertolt Brecht, Fritz Sternberg, Alfred Döblin, Geza von Cziffra and Grosz, to Carl Zuckmayer, whom he had met in Karlsruhe. After falling out with the November Group in 1924, he was one of the founders of the Red Group, which was in opposition to it. The same year, he participated in the first German art exhibition held in the USSR. In 1925, Schlichter's works were on view in the Neue Sachlichkeit exhibition in Mannheim, initiated by Gustav Friedrich Hartlaub, the director of the Kunsthalle Mannheim. His work from this period is realistic, a good example being the Portrait of Margot (1924) now in the Berlin Märkisches Museum. It depicts a prostitute who often modeled for Schlichter, standing on a deserted street and holding a cigarette. In 1926, he participated with several well-known left-wing artists in an exhibition of proletarian and anti-militarist art held in the exhibition hall of the Berlin amusement park ULAP.

In 1927, Schlichter met his future wife, Elfriede Elisabeth Schlichter (1902-1975), known as "Speedy", who, because of her appearance and demeanor in Berlin artistic circles, had the reputation of being a "living lady". From then on she became his most important confidant and reference person. In 1929, the couple got married. Since then, Speedy contributed to the couple's livelihood through having love affairs that paid off financially, which led to feelings of guilt and outbursts of jealousy from her husband. His wife was represented by Schlichter in countless drawings, sketches, watercolors and paintings.

=== The 1930s and early 1940s ===
Under the influence of his wife, he turned away from communism and the Berlin avant-garde in the early 1930s and began to revert to Roman Catholicism, and to sympathize with the circle of new nationalists. "During this phase of upheaval, Schlichter temporarily experimented with expressive forms of expression and a more painterly style in his pictures". He expanded his circle of acquaintances to include the authors Arnolt Bronnen, Ernst von Salomon and the politician Ernst Niekisch.

The seizure of power by the National Socialists in 1933 was accompanied by Schlichter with sympathy. He no longer thought he had to assert himself in “any all-Jewish artist junk shop”, as he wrote in a letter to his artist colleague Franz Radziwill, which he signed with the salutation “Sieg und Heil”. In 1932 the Schlichter couple moved back to the artist's Swabian homeland and settled in Rottenburg.

At first, Schlichter believed he could take part in the "national revolution" of the Nazis by drafting a religious-national concept of art. He believed that the art-educational task in advance was to create the "foundation of a new, German and world-renowned popular culture."

In Rottenburg, Schlichter maintained good relations with Roman Catholic Bishop Joannes Baptista Sproll, an outspoken opponent of the Nazis, whom he portrayed. The acquaintance with Carlo Schmid, one of the later fathers of the Basic Law is attested. After his autobiographical books were banned in 1933, Schlichter realized that the new rulers had no interest in him. A drawing critical of the regime that he made for the Catholic youth magazine "Junge Front" led to his exclusion from the Reich Chamber of Literature and the Reich Association of German Writers in 1934.

In 1935 he returned to Stuttgart. A more or less secret exhibition at his new place of residence in Stuttgart was made possible in 1936 with the support of Hugo Borst in his Stuttgart private gallery in Haus Sonnenhalde - this would no longer have been possible in the more heavily controlled area of museums and public institutions. In 1937, 17 of his works were confiscated as part of the Nazi action against so-called Degenerate Art. Some of his works were presented in the Degenerate Art propaganda exhibitions, and others were destroyed. At the beginning of 1938 Schlichter was temporarily removed from the Reich Chamber of Fine Arts, expelled, banned from exhibiting, and was shortly thereafter, denounced because of his "non-National Socialist lifestyle".

In 1939 he moved to Munich, where he was in contact with Hans Scholl, among others, and joined the circle around the Catholic journal Hochland. In 1939 he was able to show a drawing at the Great German Art Exhibition in Munich. His studio was destroyed by Allied bombs in 1942, and he lost some of his works.

=== After 1945 ===
After the Second World War he took part in the first General German Art Exhibition of the post-war period in Dresden in 1946 and in the first exhibition held in the Schäzler Palais, in Augsburg, in the same year and founded the Neue Gruppe, in Munich, which he chaired with Adolf Hartmann. Occasionally he also worked for the satirical magazine Der Simpl. In 1950 he joined the reestablished Deutscher Künstlerbund, for whose first exhibition in 1951 in Berlin, he presented two oil paintings, made in 1948. In 1954 he was represented with eight works at the Venice Biennale. In 1953 and 1955, the second time a few weeks before his death, he had his final solo exhibitions in Munich. Schlichter died of uremia and was buried in the Munich forest cemetery.

Schlichter created fantastical allegories and historical paintings influenced by surrealism during and especially after the World War II. In the 1950s, he had found a socially acceptable representation for his personal fantasies, by creating paintings with surreal and apocalyptical landscapes that seem to have been inspired by Giorgio de Chirico, Yves Tanguy or Salvador Dalí. He was compared to Dali because of his technical virtuosity, devotion to his muse, sexual obsessions and verbose sense of mission.

== Literary work ==
Schlichter wrote several confessional writings, some with autobiographical references and erotic themes. He published Zwischenwelten (1931), which was his first attempt to process his erotic mania and was described by the publisher as "the passionate confession of an erotically devious nature". In the two following years, he published two other confessional works: Das widerspenstige Fleisch and Tönerne Füße.
