= Zakpo =

Artists' magazine published in Germany

Zakpo: Monatsschrift für Zeitkunst, Zeitbetrachtung, Satire und Karikatur ("Zakpo: monthly journal of contemporary art, viewing of the times, satire and caricature") was an artists' magazine published in 1930 in Karlsruhe, Germany, by the actor Hermann Brand and the artists Karl Hubbuch, Erwin Spuler and Anton Weber who had been art students at the Badische Landeskunstschule in Karlsruhe. Two issues were published, in May and June 1930.

Contributors were Hermann Brand, Karl Hubbuch, Erwin Spuler, Anton Weber, Martha Kuhn, Hermann Trautwein, Stefan Walz and others. Hubbuch and Spuler wrote much of the material under the pseudonyms Boris Burawoy, Booby Neeter, Franz Radek, and Pierre Raquet.

The cover of the first issue was a lithograph by Spuler, depicting a gargantuan creature standing astride a river that runs through a city. The creature's torso is a building from which tiny figures are falling or leaping. Three men stand on the building's balcony, one of whom holds a megaphone. A banner on the building reads, Ausverkauf—Weisse woch(e) ("sellout—white sale").

The meaning of the word Zakpo was never explained in the pages of the journal, but has been interpreted as an acronym or an abbreviation: the art historian Wolfgang Grape has suggested that the two last letters may allude to politik ("politics") or polizei ("police"), while others have proposed Zeitschrift Aktiver Kommunistischer Partei Opposition ("Magazine active in communist party opposition").

In 1980, a facsimile was issued in an edition of 500 numbered copies, with an introduction by Wolfgang Grape.
