= Franz Radziwill =

German painter

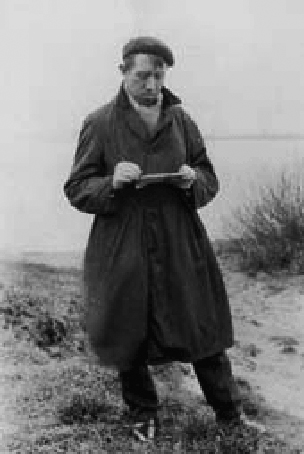
Franz Radziwill with his sketch book

Franz Radziwill (6 February 1895 – 12 August 1983) was a German painter known especially for his landscape paintings in a magic realist style. He was also associated with the New Objectivity movement.

Radziwill was born in Strohausen. His father was a potter. Radziwill apprenticed as a bricklayer in Bremen before beginning a course in architecture in 1911 at the State Institute of Higher Technology. During 1913–14 he took evening classes in draftsmanship and commercial design at the Bremen School of Arts and Crafts.

He was in the military service from 1915 to 1917. In 1920 he began to paint. Radziwill relocated to Berlin in that year, and joined the Berlin Secession.

In 1922 he moved to the secluded northern town of Dangast and concentrated on painting the local landscape. His first solo show was in 1925 in Oldenburg.

Radziwill's paintings are meticulously rendered using a glaze technique adapted from the old masters. He often introduced industrial structures and other products of modern technology into his landscapes; ships and airplanes appear prominently. The results can be categorized as magic realism according to Sergiusz Michalski, who says of Radziwill's art: "The civilized world is dazzlingly—almost supernaturally—illuminated, set against a dark sky announcing imminent disaster. By means of this magic effect, the city and landscape motifs that Radziwill is depicting, of themselves familiar, are rendered strangely alien and sinister." When figures appear they are usually small and appear as if "lost in the eerie vacuum".

In 1931 Radziwill joined the Novembergruppe. He participated in the exhibition "New German Romanticism" at the Kestner-Gesellschaft in Hanover that year.

In July 1933, Radziwill was appointed professor of painting at the Düsseldorf Academy of Art after professors including Heinrich Campendonk and Paul Klee had been dismissed from their posts by the National Socialists. In 1935, he in turn was dismissed from his position at the Academy and forbidden to paint. During the late 1930s he traveled to Africa and South America. In 1937 the Nazis declared him a degenerate artist.

Radziwill was called back into military service during World War II and served from 1939 to 1945.

Radziwill died in Wilhelmshaven on 12 August 1983.
