= New Objectivity =

1920s German art movement against expressionism

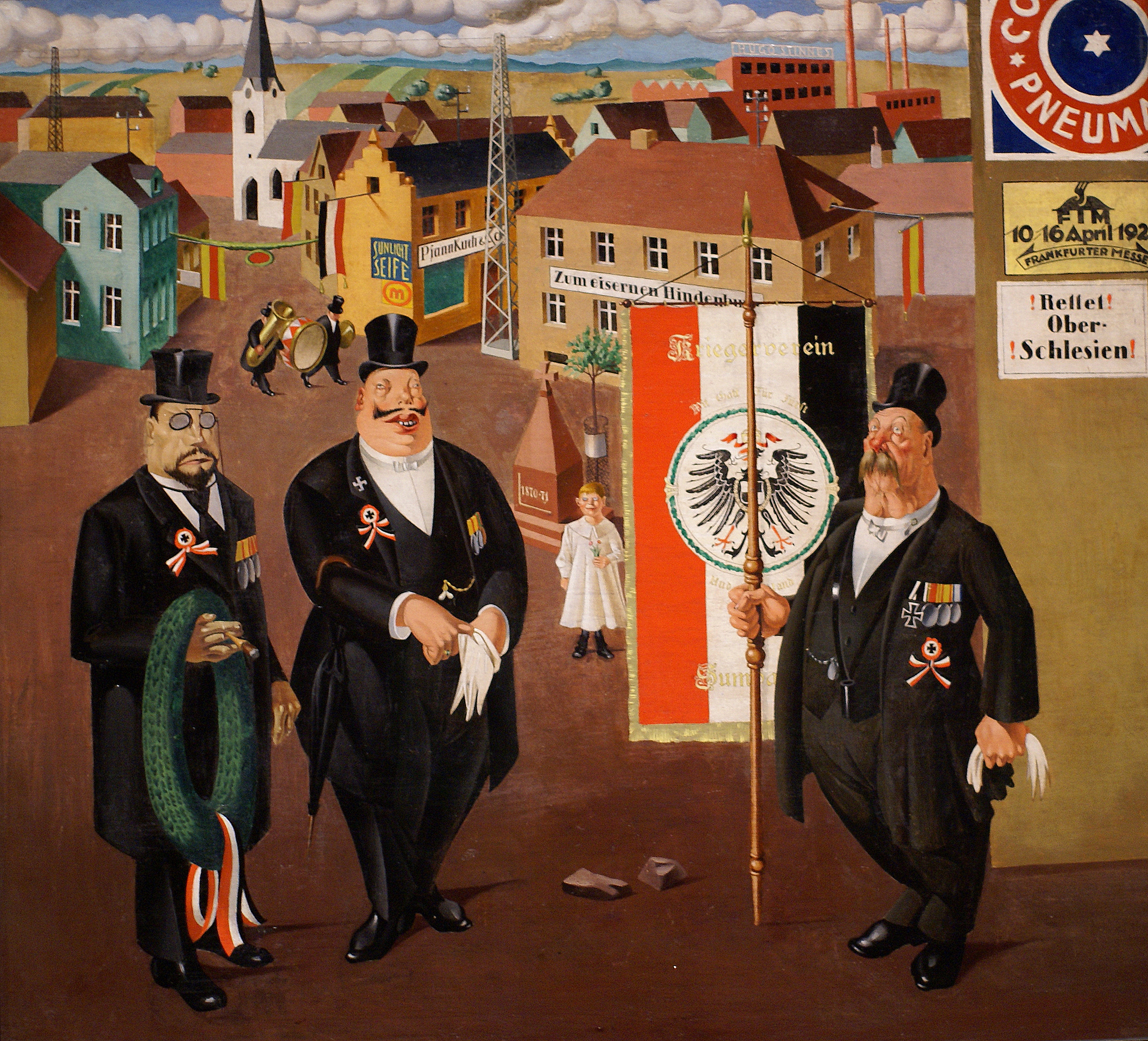
- War Veterans' Association by Georg Scholz (1922)

Additional media
- Years active: 1920s–1933
- Location: Weimar Germany
- Major figures: Max Beckmann; Otto Dix; George Grosz; Christian Schad; Rudolf Schlichter; Georg Scholz; Jeanne Mammen
- Influences: Post-expressionism
- Influenced: Magic realism

The New Objectivity (in German: Neue Sachlichkeit) was a movement in German art that arose during the 1920s as a reaction against expressionism. The term was coined by Gustav Friedrich Hartlaub, the director of the Kunsthalle in Mannheim, who used it as the title of an art exhibition staged in 1925 to showcase artists who were working in a post-expressionist spirit. As these artists—who included Max Beckmann, Otto Dix, Adolf Dietrich, George Grosz, Christian Schad, Rudolf Schlichter, Georg Scholz and Jeanne Mammen—rejected the self-involvement and romantic longings of the expressionists, Weimar intellectuals in general made a call to arms for public collaboration, engagement, and rejection of romantic idealism.

Although principally describing a tendency in German painting, the term took on a life of its own and came to characterize the attitude of public life in Weimar Germany as well as the art, literature, music, and architecture created to adapt to it. Rather than some goal of philosophical objectivity, it was meant to imply a turn towards practical engagement with the world—an all-business attitude, understood by Germans as intrinsically American.

The movement essentially ended in 1933, with the collapse of the Weimar Republic and the rise of the Nazi dictatorship.

== Meaning ==
Although "New Objectivity" is the most common translation of "Neue Sachlichkeit", other translations include "New Matter-of-factness", "New Resignation", "New Sobriety", and "New Dispassion". The art historian Dennis Crockett says there is no direct English translation, and breaks down the meaning in the original German:

Sachlichkeit should be understood by its root, Sache, meaning "thing", "fact", "subject", or "object." Sachlich could be best understood as "factual", "matter-of-fact", "impartial", "practical", or "precise"; Sachlichkeit is the noun form of the adjective/adverb and usually implies "matter-of-factness".

In particular, Crockett argues against the view implied by the translation of "New Resignation", which he says is a popular misunderstanding of the attitude it describes. The idea that it conveys resignation stems from the notion that the age of great socialist revolutions was over and that the left-leaning intellectuals living in Germany at the time wanted to adapt to the social order represented by the Weimar Republic. Crockett says the art of the Neue Sachlichkeit was meant to be more overtly political than the modes of Expressionism it was turning against: "The Neue Sachlichkeit is Americanism, cult of the objective, the hard fact, the predilection for functional work, professional conscientiousness, and usefulness."

== Background ==
Leading up to World War I, much of the art world was influenced by Futurism and Expressionism, both of which abandoned any sense of order or commitment to objectivity or tradition. Expressionism was, in particular, the dominant form of art in Germany, and it was represented in many facets of public life—in dance, theater, painting, architecture, poetry, and literature.

Expressionists abandoned nature and sought to express emotional experience, often centering their art on inner turmoil (angst), whether in reaction to the modern world, alienation from society, or the creation of personal identity. In concert with this evocation of angst and unease about bourgeois life, expressionists also echoed some of the same revolutionary feelings as the Futurists. This is evidenced by a 1919 anthology of expressionist poetry titled Menschheitsdämmerung (Twilight of Humanity)—meant to suggest that humanity was in a twilight; that there was an imminent demise of some old way of being and beneath it the urgings of a new dawning.

Critics of expressionism came from many circles. From the left, a strong critique began with Dadaism. The early exponents of Dada had been drawn together in Switzerland, a neutral country in the war, and seeing their common cause, wanted to use their art as a form of moral and cultural protest—they saw shaking off the constraints of artistic language in the same light as their refusal of national boundaries. They wanted to use their art in order to express political outrage and encourage political action. Expressionism, to Dadaists, expressed all the angst and anxieties of society but was helpless to do anything about them.

Bertolt Brecht, a German dramatist, launched another early critique of expressionism, calling it constrained and superficial. Just as in politics, Germany had a new parliament but lacked parliamentarians, he argued; in literature, there was an expression of delight in ideas but no new ideas; and in theater, a "will to drama" but no real drama. His early plays, Baal and Trommeln in der Nacht (Drums in the Night), express a repudiation of fashionable interest in Expressionism.

After the destruction of the war, more conservative critics gained prominence, particularly in their critique of Expressionist style. Throughout Europe a return to order in the arts resulted in neoclassical works by modernists such as Picasso and Stravinsky, and a turn away from abstraction by many artists, for example Matisse and Metzinger. The return to order was especially pervasive in Italy.

Because of travel restrictions, German artists in 1919–1922 had little knowledge of contemporary trends in French art; Henri Rousseau, who died in 1910, was the French painter whose influence was most apparent in the works of the New Objectivity. However, some of the Germans found important inspiration in the pages of the Italian magazine Valori plastici, which featured photographs of recent paintings by Italian classical realists.

== Painting ==
=== Verists and classicists ===
Made in Germany (Den macht uns keiner nach), by George Grosz, drawn in pen 1919, photo-lithograph published 1920 in the portfolio God with us (Gott mit Uns). Sheet 48.3 × 39.1 cm. In the collection of the MoMA, New York.

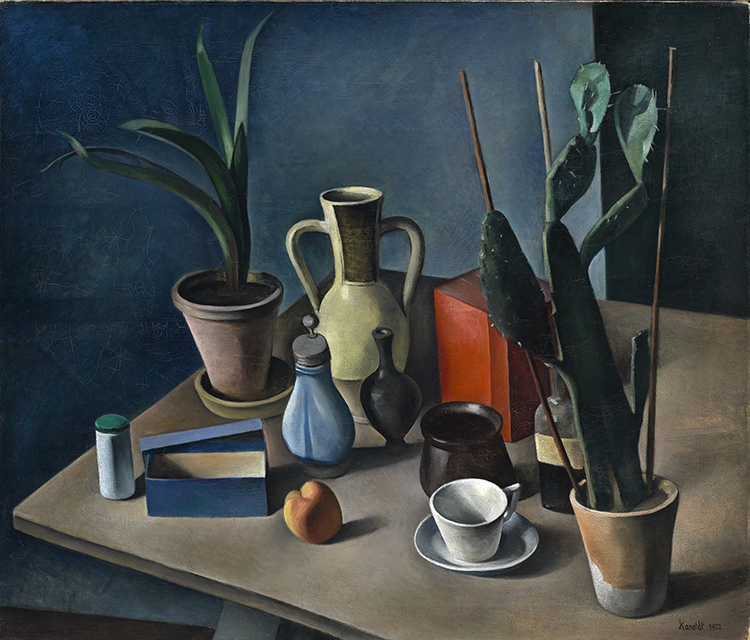
Alexander Kanoldt, Still Life with Jugs and Red Tea Caddy (1922)

Hartlaub first used the term in 1923, in a letter to colleagues describing an exhibition he was planning. In his subsequent article, "Introduction to 'New Objectivity': German Painting since Expressionism", Hartlaub explained,

what we are displaying here is distinguished by the—in itself purely external—characteristics of the objectivity with which the artists express themselves.

The New Objectivity was composed of two tendencies which Hartlaub characterized in terms of a left and right wing: on the left were the verists, who "tear the objective form of the world of contemporary facts and represent current experience in its tempo and fevered temperature"; and on the right the classicists, who "search more for the object of timeless ability to embody the external laws of existence in the artistic sphere".

The verists' vehement form of realism emphasized the ugly and sordid. Their art was raw, provocative, and harshly satirical. George Grosz and Otto Dix are considered the most important of the verists. The verists developed Dada's abandonment of any pictorial rules or artistic language into a "satirical hyperrealism", as termed by Raoul Hausmann, and of which the best known examples are the graphical works and photo-montages of John Heartfield. The use of collage in these works became a "compositional" principle for blending reality and art, as if to suggest that recording the facts of reality went beyond the simplest appearances of things. Artists such as Grosz, Dix, Georg Scholz, and Rudolf Schlichter painted satirical scenes that often depicted a madness behind what was happening, depicting the participants as cartoon-like. When painting portraits, they emphasized particular features or objects that were considered distinctive of the person depicted.

Other verists, like Christian Schad, depicted reality with a clinical precision, which suggested both an empirical detachment and intimate knowledge of the subject. Schad's paintings are characterized by "an artistic perception so sharp that it seems to cut beneath the skin", according to the art critic Wieland Schmied. Often, psychological elements were introduced into his work, suggesting an underlying unconscious reality.

Max Beckmann, who is sometimes called an expressionist although he never considered himself part of any movement, was considered by Hartlaub to be a verist and the most important artist of Neue Sachlichkeit.

Compared to the verists, the classicists more clearly exemplify the "return to order" that arose in the arts throughout Europe. The classicists included Georg Schrimpf, Alexander Kanoldt, Carlo Mense, Heinrich Maria Davringhausen, and Wilhelm Heise. The sources of their inspiration included 19th-century art, the Italian metaphysical painters, the artists of Novecento Italiano, and Henri Rousseau.

The classicists are best understood by Franz Roh's term magic realism, though Roh originally intended "magical realism" to be synonymous with the Neue Sachlichkeit as a whole. For Roh, as a reaction to expressionism, the idea was to declare "[that] the autonomy of the objective world around us was once more to be enjoyed; the wonder of matter that could crystallize into objects was to be seen anew." With the term, he was emphasizing the "magic" of the normal world as it presents itself to us—how, when we really look at everyday objects, they can appear strange and fantastic.

=== Regional groups ===
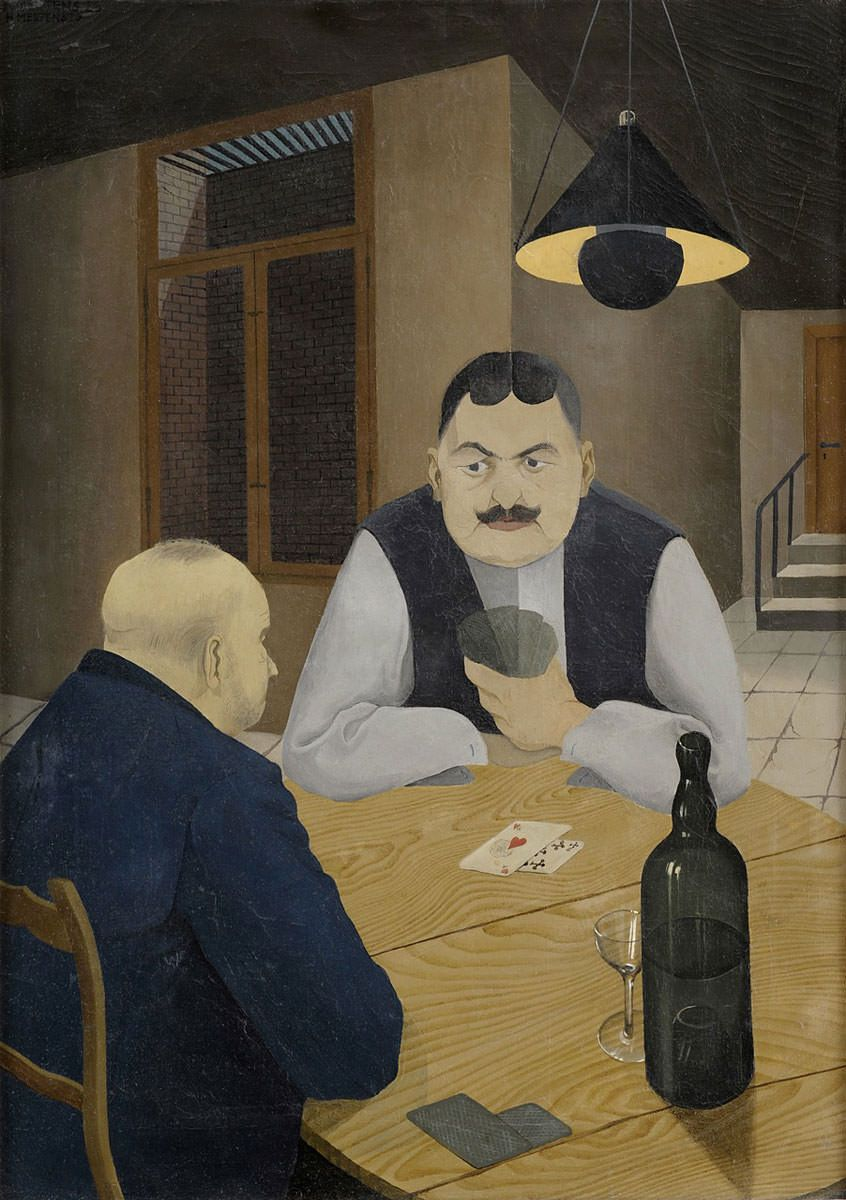
Hans Mertens, Card Players, 1929

Most New Objectivity artists did not travel widely, and stylistic tendencies were tied to geography. While the classicists were based mostly in Munich, the verists worked mainly in Berlin (Grosz, Dix, Schlichter, and Schad); Dresden (Dix, Hans Grundig, Wilhelm Lachnit and others); and Karlsruhe (Karl Hubbuch, Georg Scholz, and Wilhelm Schnarrenberger). The works of the Karlsruhe artists emphasize a hard, precise style of drawing, as in Hubbuch's watercolor The Cologne Swimmer (1923).

In Cologne, a constructivist group led by Franz Wilhelm Seiwert and Heinrich Hoerle also included Gerd Arntz. Also from Cologne was Anton Räderscheidt, who, after a brief constructivist phase, was influenced by Antonio Donghi and the metaphysical artists.

Artists active in Hanover, such as Grethe Jürgens, Hans Mertens, Ernst Thoms, and Erich Wegner, depicted provincial subject matter with an often lyrical style.

Franz Radziwill, who painted ominous landscapes, lived in relative isolation in Dangast, a small coastal town. Carl Grossberg became a painter after studying architecture in Aachen and Darmstadt and is noted for his clinical rendering of industrial technology.

== Photography ==
Albert Renger-Patzsch and August Sander are leading representatives of the "New Photography" movement, which brought a sharply focused, documentary quality to the photographic art where previously the self-consciously poetic had held sway. Other related projects, such as Neues Sehen, coexisted at the same time. Karl Blossfeldt's botanical photography is also often described as being a variation on New Objectivity. The influence of New Objectivity photography extended beyond Germany; in Japan, the interwar movement known as Shinkō shashin (New Photography) was inspired in part by the German New Objectivity.

== Architecture ==
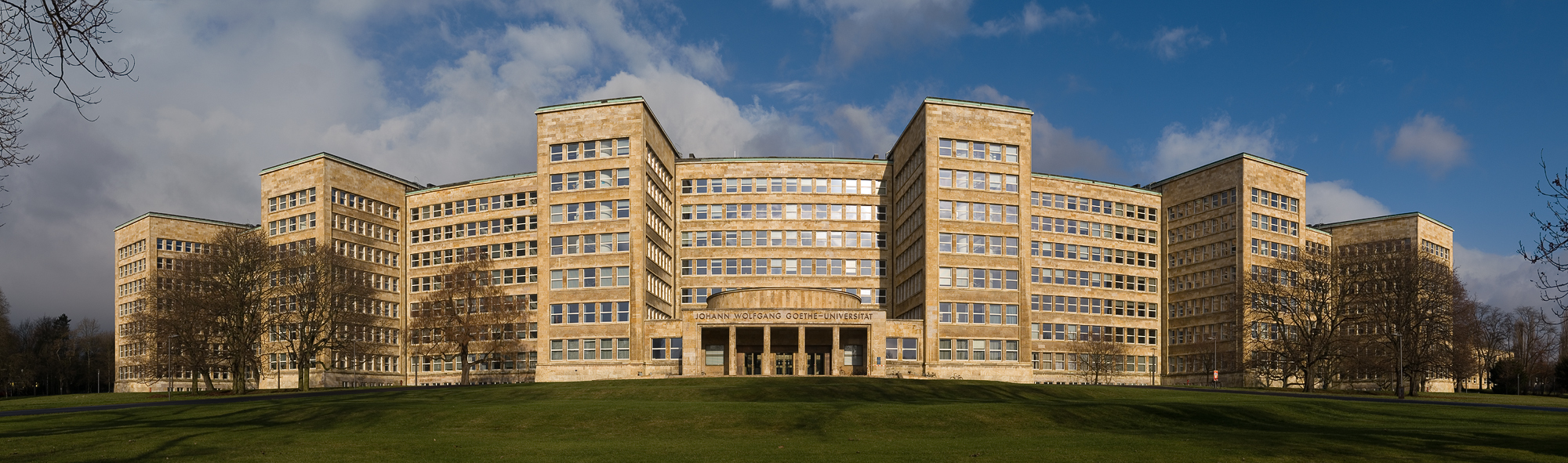
Panorama of the IG Farben Building from the south. The curved shape of the building's façade reduces the impact of its scale.

New Objectivity in architecture, as in painting and literature, describes German work of the transitional years of the early 1920s in the Weimar culture, as a direct reaction to the stylistic excesses of Expressionist architecture and the change in the national mood. Architects such as Bruno Taut, Erich Mendelsohn and Hans Poelzig turned to New Objectivity's straightforward, functionally minded, matter-of-fact approach to construction, which became known in Germany as Neues Bauen (New Building). The Neues Bauen movement, flourishing in the brief period between the adoption of the Dawes Plan and the rise of the Nazis, encompassed public exhibitions like the Weissenhof Estate, the massive urban planning and public housing projects of Taut and Ernst May, and the influential experiments at the Bauhaus.

== Film ==
In film, New Objectivity reached its high point around 1929. As a cinematic style, it translated into realistic settings, straightforward camerawork and editing, a tendency to examine inanimate objects to interpret characters and events, a lack of overt emotionalism, and social themes.

The director most associated with the movement is G. W. Pabst. Pabst's films of the 1920s concentrate on social issues such as abortion, prostitution, labor disputes, homosexuality, and addiction. His cool and critical 1925 Joyless Street is a landmark of the objective style. Other directors included Ernő Metzner, Berthold Viertel, and Gerhard Lamprecht.

== Literature ==
The primary characteristic of New Objective literature was its political perspective on reality. It renders dystopias in a non-sentimental, emotionless reporting style, with precise detail and veneration for "the fact". The works were seen as rejecting humanism, refusing to play the game of art as utopia, negating art as escapism, and expressing palpable cynicism about humanity. Authors associated with New Objectivity literature included Alfred Döblin, Hans Fallada, Irmgard Keun, Erich Kästner, and, in Afrikaans literature, Abraham Jonker, the father of poet Ingrid Jonker.

== Theater ==
Bertolt Brecht, in opposition to the focus on the individual in expressionist art, developed a collaborative method for play production, starting with his Man Equals Man project. This approach to theater-craft began to be known as "Brechtian," and the collective of writers and actors with whom he worked is known as the "Brechtian collective".

== Music ==
New Objectivity in music, as in the visual arts, rejected the sentimentality of late Romanticism and the emotional agitation of expressionism. Composer Paul Hindemith may be considered both a New Objectivist and an expressionist, depending on the composition, throughout the 1920s; for example, his wind quintet Kleine Kammermusik Op. 24, No. 2 (1922) was designed as Gebrauchsmusik; one may compare his operas Sancta Susanna (part of an expressionist trilogy) and Neues vom Tage (a parody of modern life). His music typically harkens back to baroque models and makes use of traditional forms and stable polyphonic structures, together with modern dissonance and jazz-inflected rhythms. Ernst Toch and Kurt Weill also composed New Objectivist music during the 1920s. Though known late in life for his austere interpretations of the classics, conductor Otto Klemperer was, in earlier years, the most prominent to ally himself with this movement.

== Legacy ==
The New Objectivity movement is usually considered to have ended with the Weimar Republic when the National Socialists under Adolf Hitler seized power in January 1933. The Nazi authorities condemned much of the work of the New Objectivity as "degenerate art", so that works were seized and destroyed and many artists were forbidden to exhibit. A few, including Karl Hubbuch, Adolf Uzarski, and Otto Nagel, were among the artists entirely forbidden to paint. While some of the movement's major figures went into exile, they did not continue painting in the same manner. George Grosz emigrated to America and adopted a romantic style, and by the time Max Beckmann left Germany in 1937, his work was, by Franz Roh's definition, Expressionism.

The influence of New Objectivity outside Germany can be seen in the work of artists like Balthus, Salvador Dalí (in such early works as his Portrait of Luis Buñuel of 1924), Auguste Herbin, Maruja Mallo, Cagnaccio di San Pietro, Grant Wood, Adamson-Eric, and Juhan Muks.

== See also ==
- History of painting
- Western painting
