= Georg Scholz =

German painter

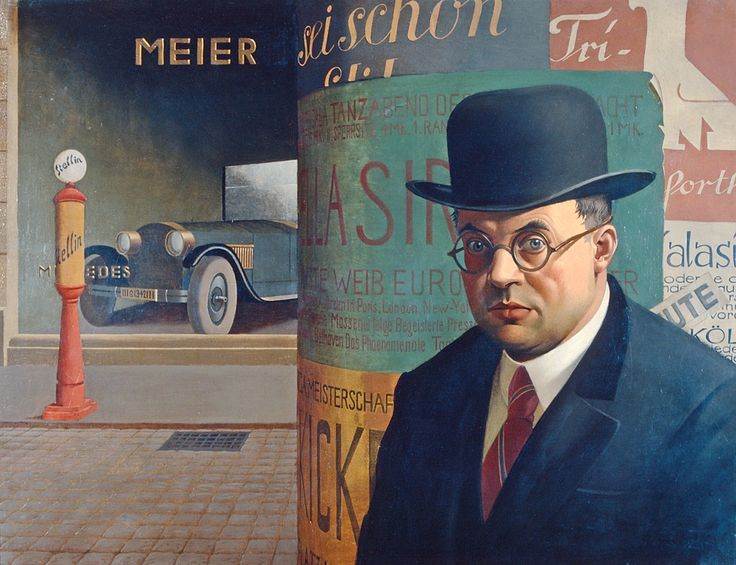
Self-Portrait in front of an Advertising Column, 1926

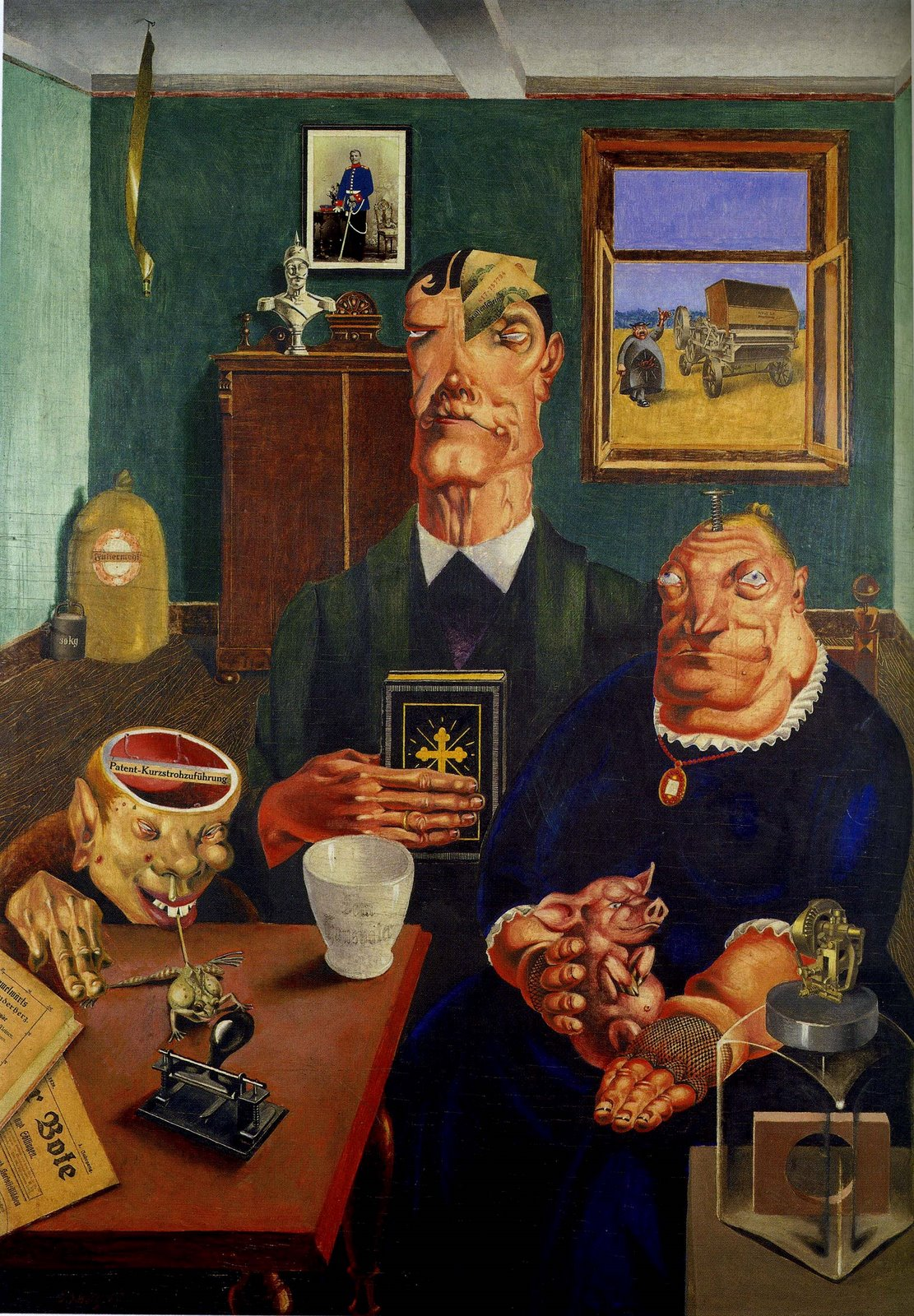
Industrial Farmers (Industriebauren), 1920

Georg Scholz (October 10, 1890 – November 27, 1945) was a German painter, member of the New Objectivity movement.

== Early life and education ==
Scholz was born in Wolfenbüttel and had his artistic training at the Karlsruhe Academy, where his teachers included Hans Thoma and Wilhelm Trübner. He later studied in Berlin under Lovis Corinth. After military service in World War I lasting from 1915 to 1918, he resumed painting, working in a style fusing cubist and futurist ideas.

== Career ==
In 1919 Scholz became a member of the Communist Party of Germany, and his work of the next few years is harshly critical of the social and economic order in postwar Germany. His Industrial Farmers of 1920 is an oil painting with collage that depicts a Bible-clutching farmer with money erupting from his forehead, seated next to his monstrous wife who cradles a piglet. Their subhuman son, his head open at the top to show that it is empty, is torturing a frog. Perhaps Scholz' best-known work, it is typical of the paintings he produced in the early 1920s, combining a controlled, crisp execution with corrosive sarcasm.

Scholz quickly became one of the leaders of the New Objectivity, a group of artists who practiced a cynical form of realism. The most famous among this group are Max Beckmann, George Grosz and Otto Dix, and Scholz's work briefly vied with theirs for ferocity of attack. By 1925, however, his approach had softened into something closer to neoclassicism, as seen in the Self-Portrait in front of an Advertising Column of 1926 and the Seated Nude with Plaster Bust of 1927.

In 1925, he was appointed a professor at the Baden State Academy of Art in Karlsruhe, where his students included Rudolf Dischinger. Scholz began contributing in 1926 to the satirical magazine Simplicissimus, and in 1928 he visited Paris where he especially appreciated the work of Bonnard.

With the rise to power of Hitler and the National Socialists in 1933, Scholz was quickly dismissed from his teaching position. Declared a Degenerate Artist, his works were among those seized in 1937 as part of a campaign by the Nazis to "purify" German culture, and he was forbidden to paint in 1939.

In 1945, the French occupation forces appointed Scholz mayor of Waldkirch, but he died that same year, in Waldkirch.

== Gallery ==
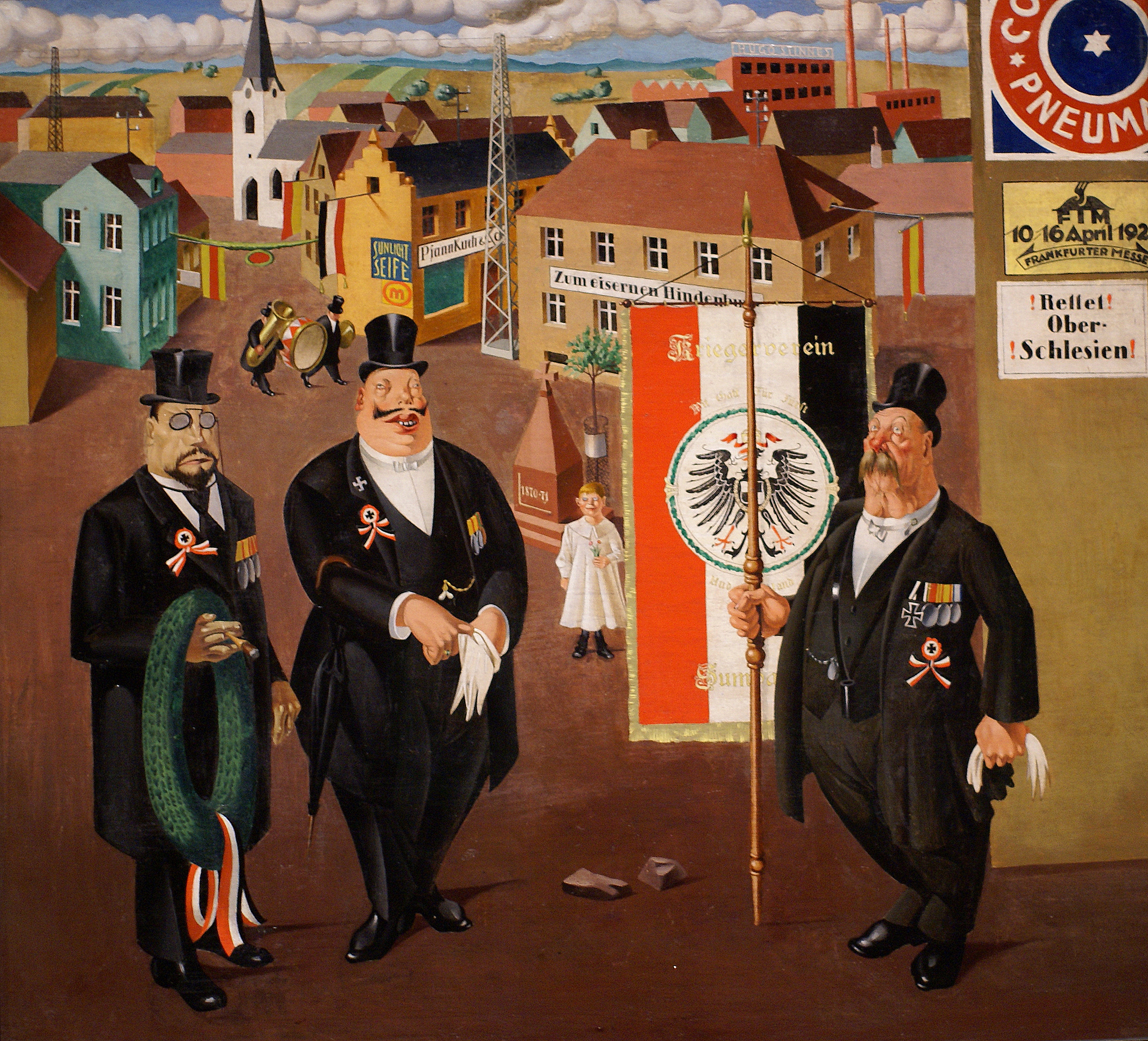
War Veterans' Association, 1922
Female Nude by Plaster Head, 1927

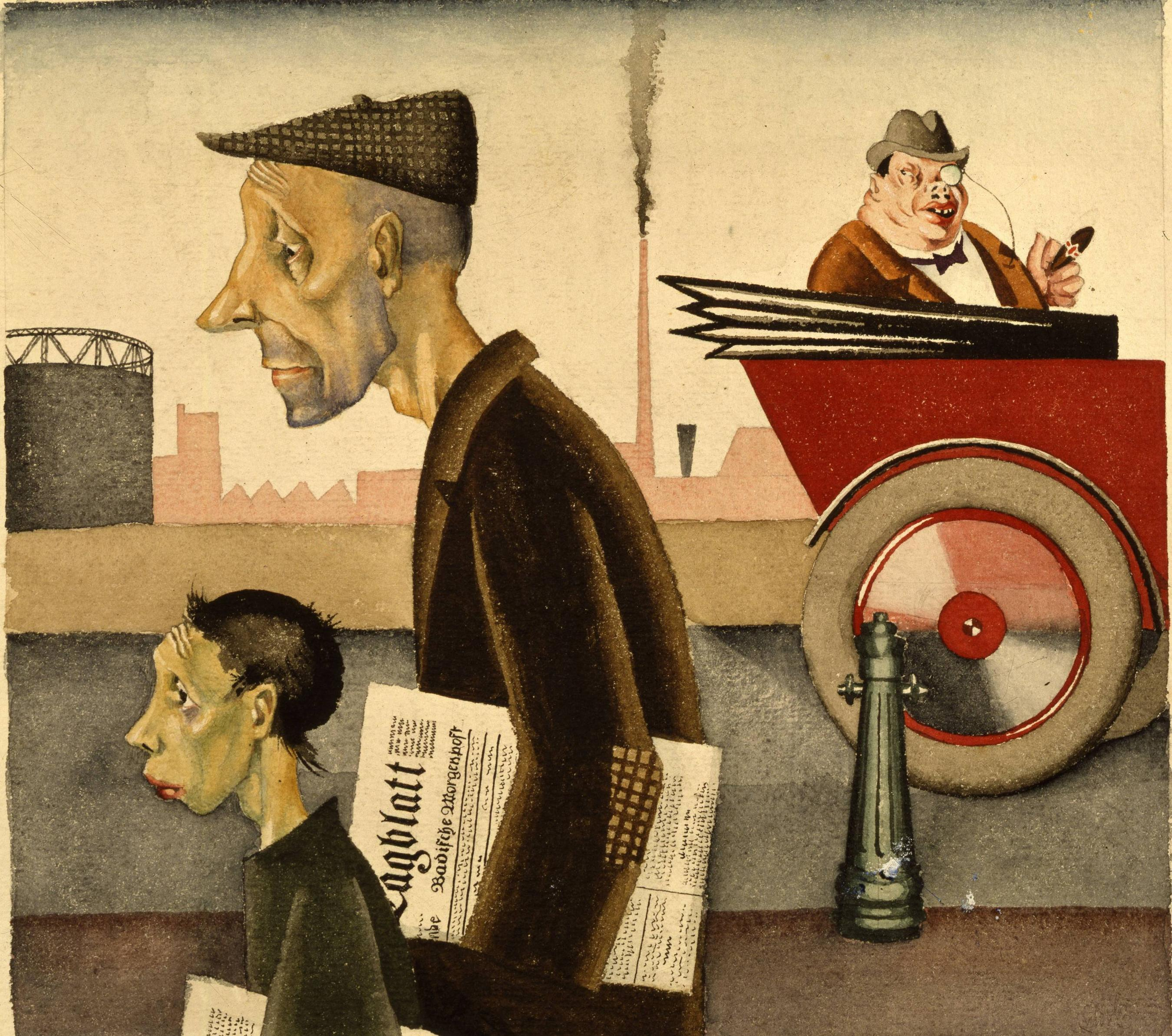
Newspaper Carriers (Work Disgraces), 1921

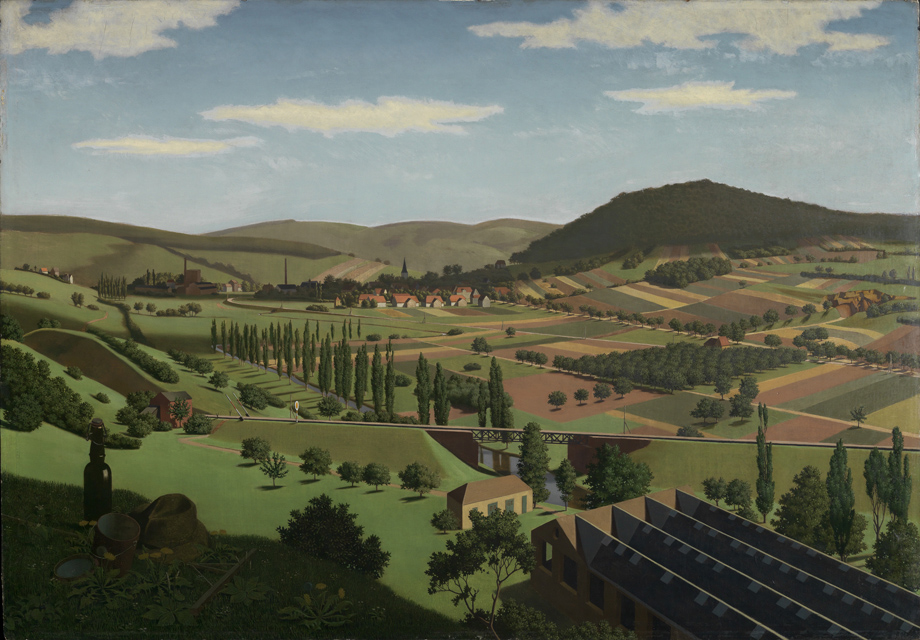
Landschaft bei Berghausen, 1924–25
