= Hanne Bergius =

German art historian

Hanne Bergius (born in 1947 in Herzberg am Harz) is a German art historian and Professor for Art History with emphases on art, photography, modern design and architecture.

== Life ==
Bergius studied art history, classical archaeology, and psychology at the Freie Universität Berlin. Her doctoral dissertation on the history and concept of Berlin Dadaism at the FU Berlin was accepted in 1984. In 1990, she received a German Research Foundation grant to investigate the relationship between tradition and modernism in the example of the New Objectivity movement. Then, in 1992, she presented her habilitation project on the concept of montage to the History Department at the FU Berlin and received the Venia legendi for Modern Art History.

She first applied her research results on Classical Modernism in her work as co-curator at the international exhibitions and the catalogs Tendenzen der zwanziger Jahre. Dada in Europa – Dokumente und Werke (15th European Art Exhibition, Berlin 1977) (Tendencies of the 1920s. Dada in Europe) and Paris-Berlin. Übereinstimmungen und Gegensätze Frankreich – Deutschland 1900–1933 (Centre Pompidou, Paris 1978) (Concordances and contrasts France – Germany 1900–1933). After these exhibitions, she advanced her research and, at the same time, continued bringing up her daughters (born in 1969 and 1973).

Bergius gained teaching experience in 1980 with a 9-year teaching appointment in the Architecture Department at the Technical University Dortmund; from 1987 to 1989 at the Kunstakademie Düsseldorf; and in 1990 through her participation in the Radio College Modern Art. After her habilitation, she taught from 1992 to 1994 as a Professor for Art History at the University of Applied Sciences Münster. From 1994 to 2007, she held a Professorship for the History of Art, Design, and Architecture at the Burg Giebichenstein University of Art and Design Her teaching concentrated on the interdependencies among the arts and on aesthetic transfer processes – for example, between Europe and Asia – to make students aware of the scope for interpretations between forms, functions, and levels of meaning in their international cultural and social-historical contexts. The point was both gaining theoretical knowledge and a path to designing and acting.

== Research ==
Bergius' research emphases lie in 19th- and 20th-century Modern art. In numerous scholarly publications since 1975, she has investigated how innovative processes of design and reception develop in their socio-cultural contexts and how they become prevalent against traditional certainties. The international Dada movement, especially Berlin's Dadaism, is one of her primary research areas.

Bergius' monograph Das Lachen Dadas (Dada's laughter), published in 1989, is about the experimental concepts of the grotesque in the Berlin Club Dada and the various projects and performances of the new type of artist, the Da-Dandy, who, in the intersection of current events, calls simultaneously for a radical revision of the arts and for bitingly satirical social criticism. In Montage und Metamechanik (2000) Bergius analyzes Dada's products – the avant-garde process of collages, assemblages, and above all photomontages and their polar field of tension with the works of the metamechanical-abstract phase, which she interprets in terms of Friedrich Nietzsche's complex influence on the Dada concept. With the expanded American publication Dada triumphs. Dada Berlin 1917–1923 (2003), as well as with essays and documentations in Dada: The Coordinates of cultural Politics (1996) and Dada and the Press (2004) she took part in Crisis and the Arts. The History of Dada, edited by Stephen C. Forster (University of Iowa). Beyond that, in 1997, Bergius participated in the international symposium Nietzsche and An Architecture of Our Minds with a paper on the deconstructive architectures of Johannes Baader and Kurt Schwitters and headed a section titled Nietzsche as prophet of Modernism, organized by The Getty Research Institute for The History of Arts and the Humanities.

She also devoted studies to such artists as Jefim Golyscheff, George Grosz, Raoul Hausmann, John Heartfield, Wieland Herzfelde, Hannah Höch, Richard Huelsenbeck, Walter Mehring, Rudolf Schlichter, Erwin Blumenfeld, Paul Citroen, Otto Dix, and Max Ernst, comprehensively reconstructing their contributions to the First International Dada Fair (1920). In 1976, feminist art historiography drew her attention to Gender Studies work on Hannah Höch and other Dadaists. She has been credited with producing the first feminist reading of the work of Hannah Höch and producing "the most exhaustive identification" of Cut with the Kitchen Knife Dada.

In particular, in 2011, Bergius investigated the early Paris work phase of the filmmaker and artist Ulrike Ottinger and, in 2013 at the exhibition Weltbilder (World images), she demonstrated the proximity of Ottinger's ethno- and mythopoetic pictorial concept to Aby Warburg's cultural-scientific research on the transformations of pictorial memory. Bergius' interest concentrated also on investigations of concepts of montage that developed in the reception of Dada and Surrealism since the 1960s in the areas of Fluxus, Lettrism, the Situationist International, Pop Art, and today's pictorial production.

== Select publications ==
=== Monographs ===
- Das Lachen Dadas. Die Berliner Dadaisten und ihre Aktionen (= Werkbund-Archiv, Vol. 19), Gießen: Anabas-Verlag, 1989, ISBN 3-87038-141-8
- Montage und Metamechanik. Dada Berlin – Artistik von Polaritäten (= Publication series of Burg Giebichenstein, Kunsthochschule Halle, Vol. 4), Berlin: Gebr. Mann, 2000, ISBN 3-7861-1525-7
- Dada Triumphs! Dada Berlin, 1917–1923. Artistry of Polarities. Montages – Metamechanics – Manifestations (translated by Brigitte Pichon), Vol. V. of the ten editions of Crisis and the Arts. The History of Dada, ed. by Stephen Foster, New Haven, Conn. u. a., Thomson/ Gale 2003, ISBN 978-0-816173-55-6

=== Editorship ===
- with Eberhard Roters: Tendenzen der zwanziger Jahre. Dada in Europa – Dokumente und Werke, 15. Europäische Kunstausstellung, Vol. 3, Berlin: Dietrich Reimer Verlag, 1977, ISBN 978-3-496010-00-5.
- with Karl Riha, Norbert Miller: Johannes Baader: Oberdada. Schriften, Manifeste, Flugblätter, Billets, Werke und Taten, Giessen: Anabas-Verlag, 1977, ISBN 3-87038-046-2
- with Karl Riha: Dada Berlin. Texte, Manifeste, Aktionen (Reclams Universal-Bibliothek No. 9857), Stuttgart 1977 ff., ISBN 3-15-009857-2
- with Françoise Lartillot: Dada Berlin. Une révolution culturelle? (Series Histoire des idées), Nantes: Ed. du Temps, 2004, ISBN 2-84274-344-X.
- with Timothy Benson, Ina Blom: Raoul Hausmann et les Avantgardes, Dijon: Les presses du réel, 2015, ISBN 978-2-84066-653-0

=== Essays ===
- Hannah Höch – Künstlerin im Berliner Dadaismus/ Hannah Höch – Femme artiste du Dadaisme Berlinois, in: Musée d´Art Moderne de la Ville de Paris/ Nationalgalerie Berlin (ed.): Hannah Höch. Collagen, Gemälde, Aquarelle, Gouachen, Zeichnungen (Cat.), Paris, Berlin: Gebr. Mann, 1976, p. 33–38, ISBN 978-3-786141-12-9
- Dada à Berlin/ Dada in Berlin. De l`esthétique du laid à la beauté révolutionaire/ Von der Ästhetik des Häßlichen zur revolutionären Schönheit, in: Centre National d'Art et de Culture Georges Pompidou (ed.): Paris-Berlin. Rapports et contrastes France-Allemagne 1900–1933 (Cat.), Paris 1978, p. 126–141, 164–172, 560–575, ISBN 978-2-85850-066-6.
- The Ambiguous Aesthetic of Dada: Towards a Definition of its Categories, in: Journal of European Studies. Literature and Ideas from the Renaissance to the Present. Jg. IX, 1979, p. 26–38, in: Richard Sheppard (ed.): Dada. Studies of a Movement, Norwich: Alpha Academic, 1980, p. 28–40, ISSN 0047-2441.
- Kurt Schwitters: Aspects of Dada and Merz, in: Christos M. Joachimides, Norman Rosenthal, Wieland Schmied (eds.): German Art in the 20th Century 1905 – 1985 (Cat.), ISBN 978-3791307435
- Berlin – Gezeichnete Metropole. Vom Liniennetz zur Kontur/ Berlin – A City Drawn. From the Linear Network to the Contour, in: Peter Nisbet, Carol O. Selle (ed.): German Realist Drawings of the 1920s/ Deutsche Realistische Zeichnungen der Zwanziger Jahre (Cat.), Harvard University Art Museum, Busch Reisinger Museum 1986, p. 15–41, ISBN 978-0-916724-61-0
- Berlin, the Dada Metropolis, in: Jean Clair (ed.): The 1920s. Age of the Metropolis (Cat.), The Museum of Fine Arts, Montreal 1991, p. 253–269, ISBN 978-2-89192-139-8
- Kurt Schwitters 'Créer du nouveau à partir de débris, in: Serge Lemoine (ed.): Kurt Schwitters, Centre Georges Pompidou, Paris: Editions du Centre Pompidou, 1994, p. 38–45, ISBN 2-8585-0799-6
- Architecture as the Dionysian-Apollonian Process of Dada, in: Alexis Kosta, Irving Wolfarth (eds.): Nietzsche and 'An Architecture of our Minds'', The Getty Research Institute for The History of Arts and the Humanities, Los Angeles 1999, p. 115–139, ISBN 0-89236-485-8
- Die große Erzählung und ihre Wandlungen oder die Parabel vom Frosch. Zum Konzept der Burg Giebichenstein, Burg Giebichenstein – eine Hochschule im Umbruch/A long and changeful story – or The Parable of the Frog, in: Rudolf Schäfer (ed.): Burg Giebichenstein. Hochschule für Kunst und Design Halle, Schriftenreihe No. 10 (Cat.), Halle 2002, p. 28–90, ISBN 3-86019-030-X
- Dada Grotesque, in: Pamela Kort (ed.): Comic Grotesque. Wit and Mockery in German Art, 1870–1940, München, New York u. a.: Prestel, 2005, p. 155–171, ISBN 3-7913-6004-3.
- Dada as 'Buffoonery and Requiem at the Same Time', in: Debbie Lewer (ed.): Post-Impressionism to World War II (Blackwell Anthologies in Art History), Blackwell Publishing 2006, p. 366–381, ISBN 978-1-40511-152-2.
- Dada Berlin and its Aesthetic of Effects: Playing the Press, in: Harriet Watts (ed.): Dada and the Press, Vol. IX, Crisis and the Arts. The History of Dada. New Haven, Conn., Thomson, Gale u. a. 2004, p. 67–92. Dada-Berlin and the Press, in: ibid., p. 92–134; Articles about Dada Berlin in Daily Newspapers. Selected Bibliography, in: ibid., p. 134–152, ISBN 0-8161-0509-X
- Ulrike Ottingers Peinture Nouvelle. Entzifferung von Alltagsmythen/Ulrike Ottinger's Peinture Nouvelle. Decoding the Myths of Everyday Life, in: Marius Babias (ed.): Ulrike Ottinger, NBK Ausstellungen, Bd. 11, Köln: Verlag der Buchhandlung Walther König, 2011, p. 14–99, ISBN 978-3-863350-75-8
- Unterwegs – Der Kontinent Ulrike Ottinger/En Route – The Continent Ulrike Ottinger, in: Kestnergesellschaft (ed.): Ulrike Ottinger – Weltbilder/ World Images (Cat.), Hannover 2013, p. 103–114, ISBN 978-3-869844-25-1
- Dada Raoul dans les années cinquante – Reconsidérer Dada, in: Timothy Benson, Hanne Bergius, Ina Blom (eds.): Raoul Hausmann et les avant-gardes, Dijon: Les Presses du Réel, 2014, p. 34–69, ISBN 978-2-84066-653-0"
- Navigating the Up-To-Date Sea. Dada and Bauhaus Portrait Photomontages, in: Cat. Original bauhaus, Nina Wiedemeyer (ed.), Bauhaus-Archiv/ Museum für Gestaltung, München/ London/ New York 2019, p. 153–163, ISBN 978-3-7913-5904-5
- DADA-Ausstellungen 1958 und 1977 im Kontext der Wirkungsgeschichten von Dada, in: Agathe Mareuge, Sandro Zanetti (eds.): The Return of DADA/ Die Wiederkehr von DADA/ Le Retour de DADA, Bd. 2, Les Presses du Réel, Dijon 2022, p. 35–62, ISBN 978-2-37896-208-1
