= List of Dadaists =

The following is a list of Dadaists. It includes those who are generally classed into different movements, but have created some Dadaist works.

== A - D ==
- Pierre Albert-Birot (22 April 1876 – 25 July 1967)
- Guillaume Apollinaire (August 26, 1880 – November 9, 1918)
- Louis Aragon (October 3, 1897 – December 24, 1982)
- Jean Arp (September 16, 1886 – June 7, 1966)
- Alice Bailly (February 25, 1872 – January 1 1938)
- Johannes Baader (June 22, 1875 – January 15, 1955)
- Johannes Theodor Baargeld (October 9, 1892 – August 16 or 17, 1927)
- Hugo Ball (February 22, 1886 – September 14, 1927)
- André Breton (February 19, 1896 – September 28, 1966)
- Gino Cantarelli (1899 – 1950)
- John Covert (painter) (May 22, 1887 – November 1918?)
- Jean Crotti (April 24, 1878 – January 30, 1958)
- Theo van Doesburg (August 30, 1883 – March 7, 1931)
- Katherine Sophie Dreier (September 10, 1877 - March 29, 1952)
- Marcel Duchamp (July 28, 1887 – October 2, 1968)
- Suzanne Duchamp (20 October 1889 – 11 September 1963)

== E - H ==
- Viking Eggeling (October 21, 1880 – May 19, 1925)
- Paul Éluard (December 14, 1895 – November 18, 1952)
- Max Ernst (April 2, 1891 – April 1, 1976)
- Julius Evola (May 19, 1898 – June 11, 1974)
- Lyonel Feininger (July 17, 1871 – January 13, 1956)
- Elsa von Freytag-Loringhoven (12 July 1874 – 15 December 1927)
- George Grosz (July 26, 1893 – July 6, 1959)
- Raoul Hausmann (July 12, 1886 – February 1, 1971)
- John Heartfield (June 19, 1891 – April 26, 1968)
- Emmy Hennings (February 17, 1885 – August 10, 1948)
- Wieland Herzfelde (April 11, 1896 – November 23, 1988)
- Hannah Höch (November 1, 1889 – May 31, 1978)
- Richard Huelsenbeck (April 23, 1892 – April 30, 1974)
- Barry Humphries (17 February, 1934 – 22 April, 2023)

== I - R ==
- Marcel Janco (May 24, 1895 – April 21, 1984)
- Tsuji Jun (October 4, 1884 – November 24, 1944)
- Yves Klein (April 28, 1928 – June 6, 1962) (see Neo-Dada)
- Hans Leybold (April 2, 1892 – September 8, 1914)
- Filippo Tommaso Marinetti (December 22, 1876 – December 2, 1944)
- Agnes Elizabeth Ernst Meyer (1887 – 1970)
- Pranas Morkūnas (October 9, 1900 – December 28, 1941)
- Clément Pansaers (May 1, 1885, – October 31, 1922)
- Francis Picabia (January 28, 1879 – November 30, 1953)
- Man Ray (August 27, 1890 – November 18, 1976)
- Georges Ribemont-Dessaignes (June 19, 1884 – July 9, 1974)
- Hans Richter (April 6, 1888 – February 1, 1976)

== S - Z ==
- Yi Sang (September 14, 1910 – April 17, 1937)
- Christian Schad (August 21, 1894 – February 25, 1982)
- Morton Livingston Schamberg (October 15, 1881 – October 13, 1918)
- Rudolf Schlichter (December 6, 1890 – May 3, 1955)
- Kurt Schwitters (June 20, 1887 – January 8, 1948)
- Walter Serner (January 15, 1889 – August 1942)
- Philippe Soupault (August 2, 1897 – March 12, 1990)
- Sophie Taeuber (January 19, 1889 – January 13, 1943)
- Tristan Tzara (April 4 or 16, 1896 – December 25, 1963)
- Louis Norton-Varése (20 November 1890 – 1 July 1989)
- Beatrice Wood (March 3, 1893 – March 12, 1998)
- Fried-Hardy Worm (February 8, 1896, Berlin – August 29, 1973)
- Marius de Zayas (March 13, 1880 – January 10, 1961)
