= Morkūnas =

Morkūnas is a surname. Notable people with the surname include:

- Donatas Morkūnas (born 1957), Lithuanian politician
- Kazys Morkūnas (c. 1925–2014), Lithuanian stained glass artist
- Povilas Morkūnas (1920–1953), anti-Soviet Lithuanian partisan
- Pranas Morkūnas (1900–1941),Lithuanian translator and poet
- Simon Morkunas (1902–1997), Lithuanian Catholic priest
