= Donatas =

- Gender: Male

Origin
- Region of origin: Lithuania

Donatas is a Lithuanian masculine given name and may refer to the following individuals:

- Donatas Banionis (born 1924), Lithuanian actor
- Donatas Kazlauskas (born 1994), Lithuanian footballer
- Donatas Malinauskas (1877-1942), Lithuanian politician and diplomat
- Donatas Morkūnas (born 1957), Lithuanian politician, banker and lecturer
- Donatas Motiejūnas (born 1990), Lithuanian basketball center and power forward
- Donatas Montvydas (born 1987), Lithuanian singer-songwriter
- Donatas Nakrošius (born 1991), Lithuanian footballer
- Donatas Navikas (born 1983), Lithuanian football midfielder
- Donatas Plungė (born 1960), Lithuanian hammer thrower
- Donatas Sabeckis (born 1992), Lithuanian basketball player
- Donatas Škarnulis (born 1977), Lithuanian race walker and Olympic competitor
- Donatas Slanina (born 1977), Lithuanian basketball guard
- Donatas Tarolis (born 1994), Lithuanian basketball player
- Donatas Vėželis (born 1981), Lithuanian ballroom dancer
- Donatas Vencevičius (born 1973), Lithuanian football midfielder, coach and manager
- Donatas Zavackas (born 1980), Lithuanian basketball power forward
