= Jedermann sein eigner Fussball =

German satiric magazine

Cover of the first edition of the publication Everyman His Own Football (German: Jedermann sein eigner Fussball)

Jedermann sein eigner Fussball (English: Everyman His Own Football) was a single-issue illustrated satirical magazine published by Malik Verlag (Wieland Herzfelde's publishing house) on 15 February 1919; the German police arrested staff and confiscated copies immediately on publication.

It included two photomontages by John Heartfield on the front cover and six line drawings by George Grosz. Texts are by Herzfelde, Walter Mehring, Mynona; other contributors jointly credited include Richard Huelsenbeck, Erwin Piscator, Karl Nierendorf, and J.H. Kuhlemann. The cover's typeface and layout satirise contemporary trends in conservative German newspaper design.

The issue contains photomontages such as Heartfield's "Wer ist der Schönste? (who is the most beautiful?)," a proposed beauty contest of political, government, and military leaders whose faces are playfully spread across an open fan. In spite of its absurdist amusements, this singular issue was a work of impassioned radical opinion, published only a few weeks after the communist revolt in Berlin had been quashed by Gustav Noske's Free Corps, and Karl Liebknecht and Rosa Luxemburg executed. "Jedermann sein eigner Fussball" is an example of Berlin Dada in its most aggravated political phase.

== Sources ==
- hatii.arts.gla.ac.uk
- arslibri.com
