= Neerwinden =

Section of Landen, Belgium

Coordinates: 50°45′57″N 5°02′18″E

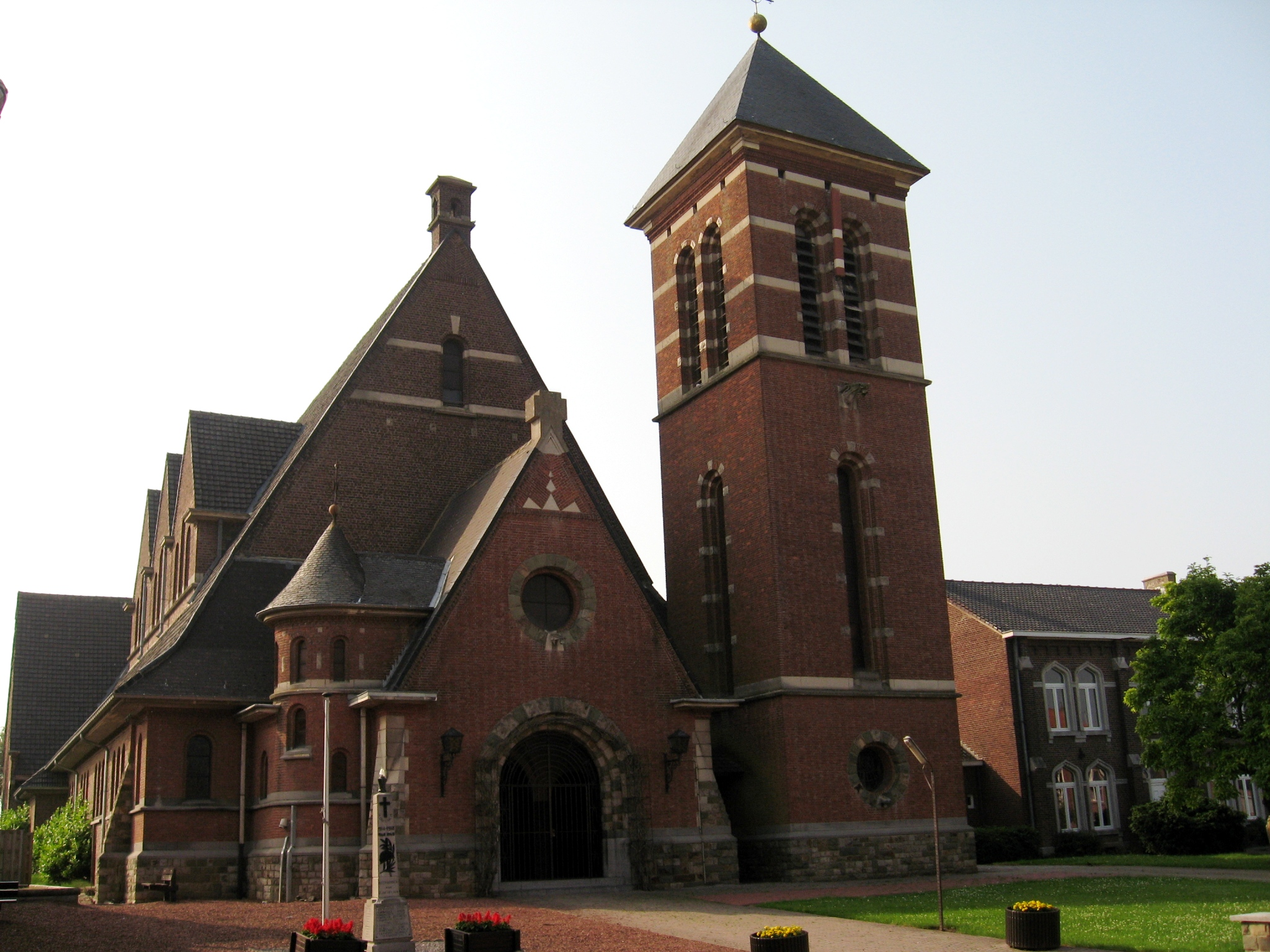
The Holy Cross Church, Neerwinden (Heilig Kruiskerk) in Neerwinden

Neerwinden (Dutch pronunciation: [ˈneːrʋɪndə(n)]) is a village in Belgium, located in the municipality of Landen, in the province of Flemish Brabant, Flanders.

The village gives its name to two great historical battles. The first, the Battle of Neerwinden (1693) (usually called the Battle of Landen), was fought on 29 July 1693, during the Nine Years War, between the Anglo-Allied army under William III of England and the French under the duke of Luxemburg, ending in a French victory. The second, the Battle of Neerwinden (1793), took place on 18 March 1793, during the War of the First Coalition, between Austria under Prince Josias of Coburg and the French under General Charles François Dumouriez and ended in an Austrian victory.

Neerwinden station is on line 36.

== Notable people ==
- Clément Pansaers (1885–1922), poet and Dadaist
