= Dada (magazine) =

Publication (1917–1921) focused on the art and beliefs of the Dada groups

Dada was a periodical published between July 1917 and September 1921 first in Zürich, then in Paris. It focused on the art and beliefs of the Dada groups. The magazine was edited by the co-founder of Zürich Dada, Tristan Tzara.

== Issues ==
Issue 3 was published in 1918. This issue features Tzara's Dada Manifesto, in which he declares "Dada ne signifie rien" [Dada means nothing].

Issue 4-5 was a combined issue, published in May 1919. The cover reads "DADA 4-5," and beneath it is a black and white machine drawing by Picabia. It contains the text "Reveil Matin," French for alarm clock. This references the Dada ideas surrounding Freudian subconscious, and "waking up" to the world.

The seventh issue was titled DadaPhone. The cover was an illustration of a machine by Picabia. Contributers include Breton, Aragon, and Soupault. An example is in the collection of the V&A Museum in London.
