= Pranas Morkūnas =

Lithuanian translator and poet dadaist

Pranas Morkūnas (9 October 1900 – 28 December 1941) was a Lithuanian translator and dadaist poet.

== Biography and literary works ==
Morkūnas was born in Riga, Latvia on 9 October 1900. In 1919 he was volunteer in Lithuanian army, later he participated in Lithuanian Riflemen's Union. From 1924 he was studying Lithuanian language and law at University of Lithuania, was correspondent of Lithuanian press, translated erotic and mystery literature into Lithuanian, was working as administrator of journal Kultūra (Culture).

His poem šaipėrantas was published in January 1930, in the first issue of pro-communist literary journal Trečias frontas (The Third front), as "an interesting formal experiment". šaipėrantas was not understood and ridiculed after publication. His collection of dadaist and imaginist poems Dainuoja degeneratas. Dadaistiški imažinistiniai eilėraščiai was only published in 1993. Poetry of Morkūnas was continuation of rebellion started by The Four Winds literary movement against traditional poetry .

Morkūnas died in the front at Moscow on 28 December 1941 .
