= First International Dada Fair =

The First International Dada Fair took place in Berlin at the gallery of Dr. Burchard, from 30 June to 25 August 1920. It was to become the most famous of all Berlin Dada's exploits. It featured almost 200 works by artists including Hans Arp, Max Ernst, Hannah Höch, Francis Picabia, and Rudolf Schlichter, as well as key works by George Grosz, John Heartfield, and Raoul Hausmann. The work Tatlin at Home, 1920, can be clearly seen in one of the publicity photos taken by a professional photographer; the exhibition, whilst financially unsuccessful, gained prominent exposure in Amsterdam, Milan, Rome, and Boston. The exhibition also proved to be one of the main influences on the content and layout of Entartete Kunst, the show of degenerate art put on by the Nazis in 1937, with key slogans such as "Nehmen Sie DADA Ernst" and "Take Dada Seriously!" appearing in both exhibitions.
