= Clément Pansaers =

Belgian poet and artist (1885–1922)

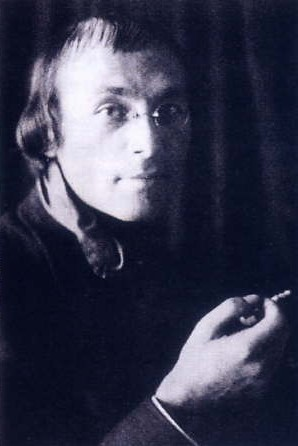
- Born: 1 May 1885; Neerwinden, Belgium
- Died: 31 October 1922 (aged 37); Brussels
- Other name: Julius Krekel
- Occupation: Poet
- Known for: Dada movement in Belgium

Clément Pansaers (1 May 1885 – 31 October 1922) was a Belgian poet and artist known for being the main proponent of the Dada movement in Belgium.

== Early life ==
Pansaers was born 1 May 1885 in Neerwinden, Belgium.

== Career ==
Pansaers began writing poetry in 1916 after abandoning his career as an Egyptologist. Along with several members of the Brussels avant-garde circle, he founded the review Résurrection, which published early texts by Carl Einstein, Pierre Jean Jouve, Franz Werfel, and others.

His first properly "Dadaist" work, Pan-Pan au Cul du Nu Nègre was published in 1920. This pamphlet, along with Bar Nicanor (1921), was read and admired by figures like James Joyce, Ezra Pound, Theo van Doesburg, Francis Picabia and André Breton.

Pansaers moved to Paris in 1921, where he took part in Dada manifestations until his early death from Hodgkin's disease. He died 31 October 1922 in Brussels.

== Bibliography ==
- Le Pan-Pan au Cul du Nu Nègre (Brussels: Editions Alde, 1920)
- Bar Nicanor (Brussels: Editions AIO, 1921)
- L'apologie de la paresse (Antwerp: Ca Ira!, 1922)
- Bar Nicanor et autres textes dada, edited by Marc Dachy (Paris: Lebovici/Champ Libre, 1986)
- Apologia dell'ozio, (Firenze, Italia, Gratis, 1993)
- L'apologie de la paresse (Paris, Allia, 1996)
- Le Pan Pan au Cul du Nu Nègre, (Brussels, Didier Devillez éditeur, 2002, collection "fac similé", with a preface by Benjamin Hennot)
- Bar Nicanor, (Brussels, Didier Devillez éditeur, 2002, collection "fac similé", with a preface by Benjamin Hennot)
- Apologie van de luiheid, (Nijmegen, Van Tilt, traduction Rokus Hofstede, with a preface by Benjamin Hennot)
- Pan Pan voor de Poeper van de Neger Naakt & Bar Nicanor, (Nijmegen, Van Tilt, 2003, with a preface by Benjamin Hennot)
- Pan-Dada: The Writings of Clement Pansaers, edited by Michael Sanchez with a preface by Marc Dachy, forthcoming.
