= Donatas Plungė =

Lithuanian hammer thrower (born 1960)

Donatas Plungė (born 11 November 1960) is a retired male hammer thrower from Lithuania, who competed in the late 1980s and early 1990s on the highest level. He set his personal best (80.78 metres) on 22 September 1989 at a meet in Volgograd.
