= Johannes Theodor Baargeld =

German painter

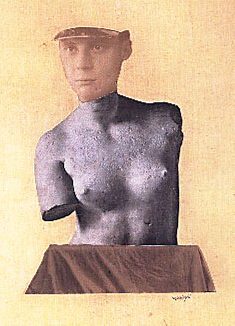
Typical Vertical Mess as Depiction of the Dada Baargeld (1920)

Johannes Theodor Baargeld was a pseudonym of Alfred Emanuel Ferdinand Grünwald (9 October 1892 – 16 or 17 August 1927), a German painter and poet who, together with Max Ernst, founded the Cologne Dada group. He also used the name Zentrodada in connection with Dada.

Baargeld was born in Stettin (Szczecin), Prussian Pomerania. He studied jurisprudence at Oxford and Bonn. Baargeld was the editor of the periodical The Fan (Der Ventilator) which Ernst and Hans Arp started in 1919, and he collaborated on many other Dadaist publications such as Bulletin D and Dada W/3.

== Military service ==
When war broke out in 1914, Baargeld enlisted and served as a reserve lieutenant for three years.

== Literary career ==
After serving in the army, Baargeld began his literary career in 1917 by writing for Pfemfert's journal Die Aktion. His contributions were mostly lyrical and political works. A year after he began writing for Die Aktion, Baargeld joined the Independent Socialist Party of Germany (USPD). Before establishing Dada, Baargeld had been the patron of a leftist periodical, Der Ventilator. The journal was the political and artistic means through which the would-be members of Dada, such as Angelika and Heinrich Hoerle, published satirical works.

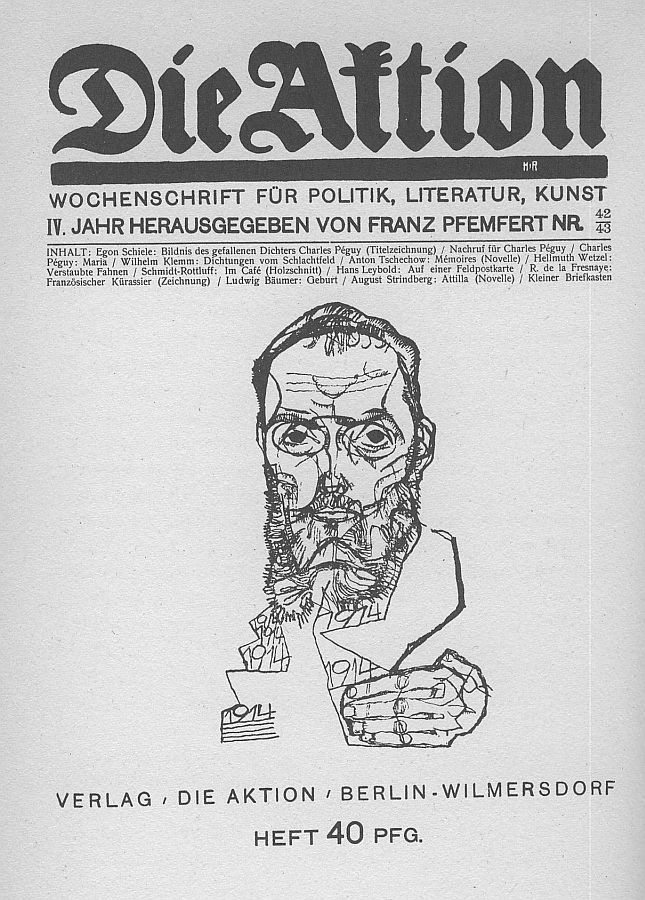
The front cover of Die Aktion from 1914 issue.

== Painting ==
Baargeld also collaborated with Max Ernst on some of the collages used in Ernst's Fatagaga series.

Baargeld gave up painting in 1921 and in 1927 died in an avalanche while climbing Aiguille de Bionnassay in the French Alps.

== See also ==
- List of German painters
- List of Dadaists
