= Dada =

Avant-garde art movement in the early 20th century

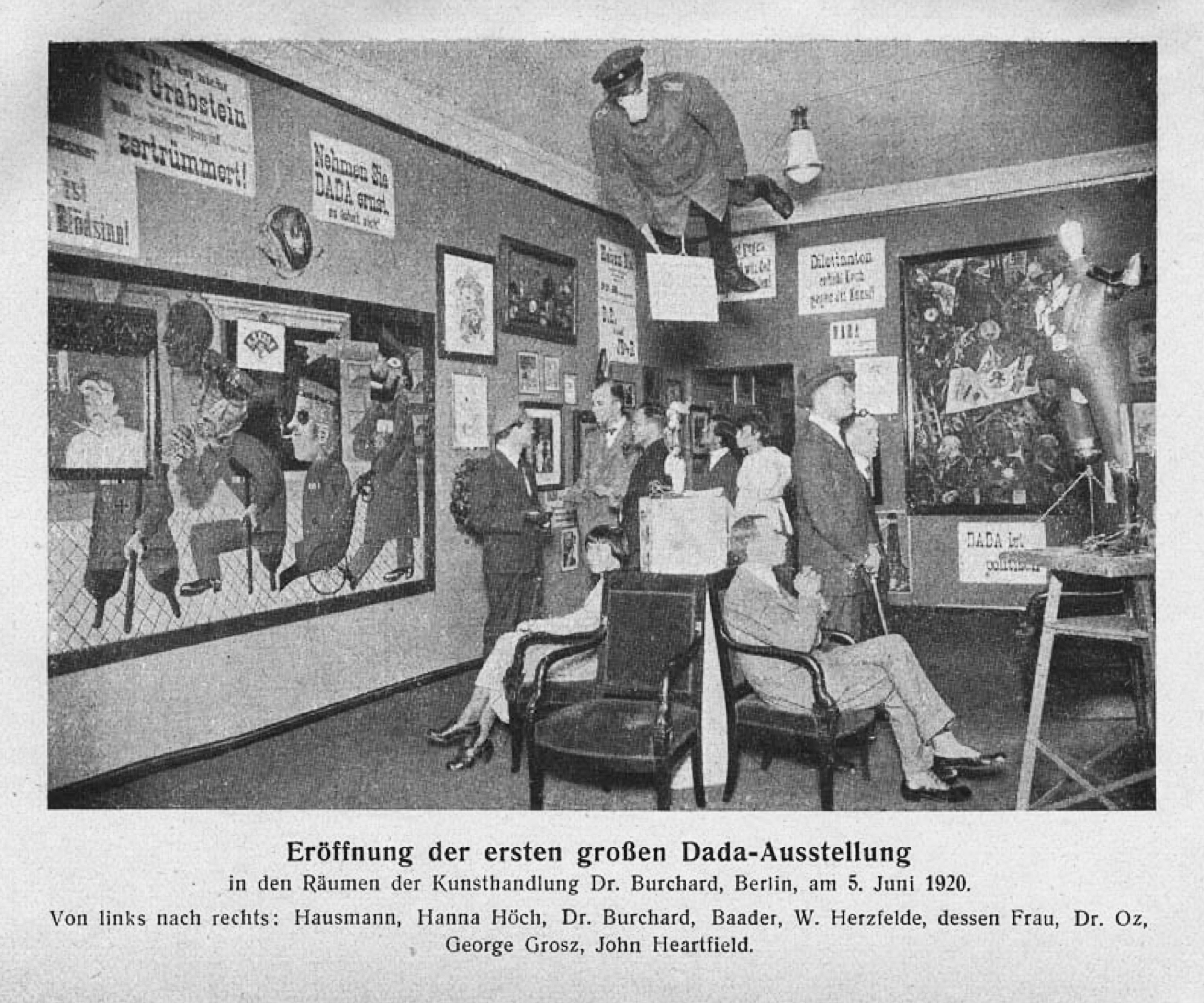
Grand opening of the first Dada exhibition: International Dada Fair, Berlin, 5 June 1920. The central figure hanging from the ceiling is an effigy of a German officer with a pig's head. From left to right: Raoul Hausmann, Hannah Höch (sitting), Otto Burchard, Johannes Baader, Wieland Herzfelde, Margarete Herzfelde, Dr. Oz (Otto Schmalhausen), George Grosz and John Heartfield.

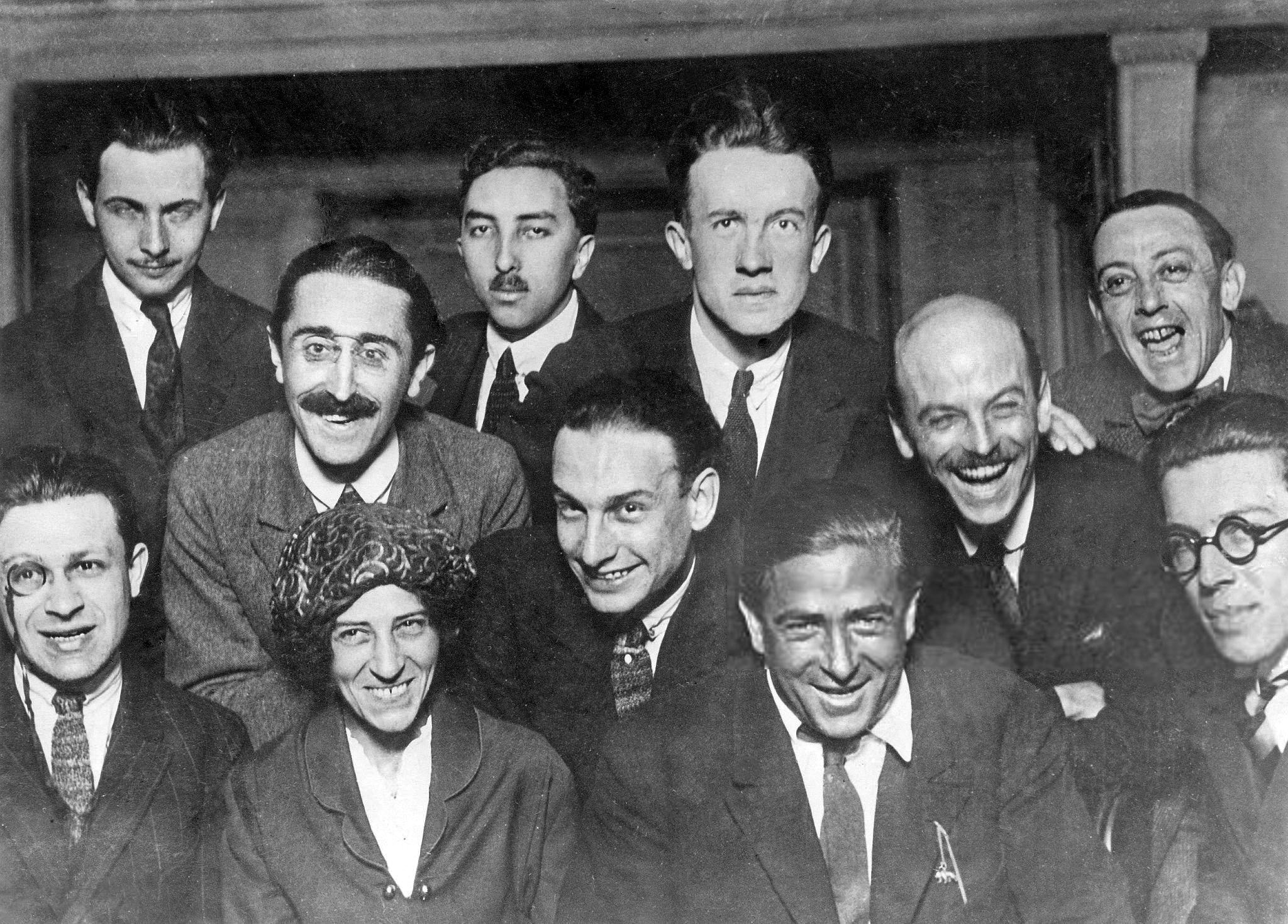
Dada artists, group photograph, 1920, Paris. From left to right, Back row: Louis Aragon, Théodore Fraenkel, Paul Eluard, Clément Pansaers, Emmanuel Fay (cut off). Second row: Paul Dermée, Philippe Soupault, Georges Ribemont-Dessaignes. Front row: Tristan Tzara (with monocle), Céline Arnauld, Francis Picabia, André Breton.

Cover of the first edition of the publication Dada, Tristan Tzara; Zürich, 1917

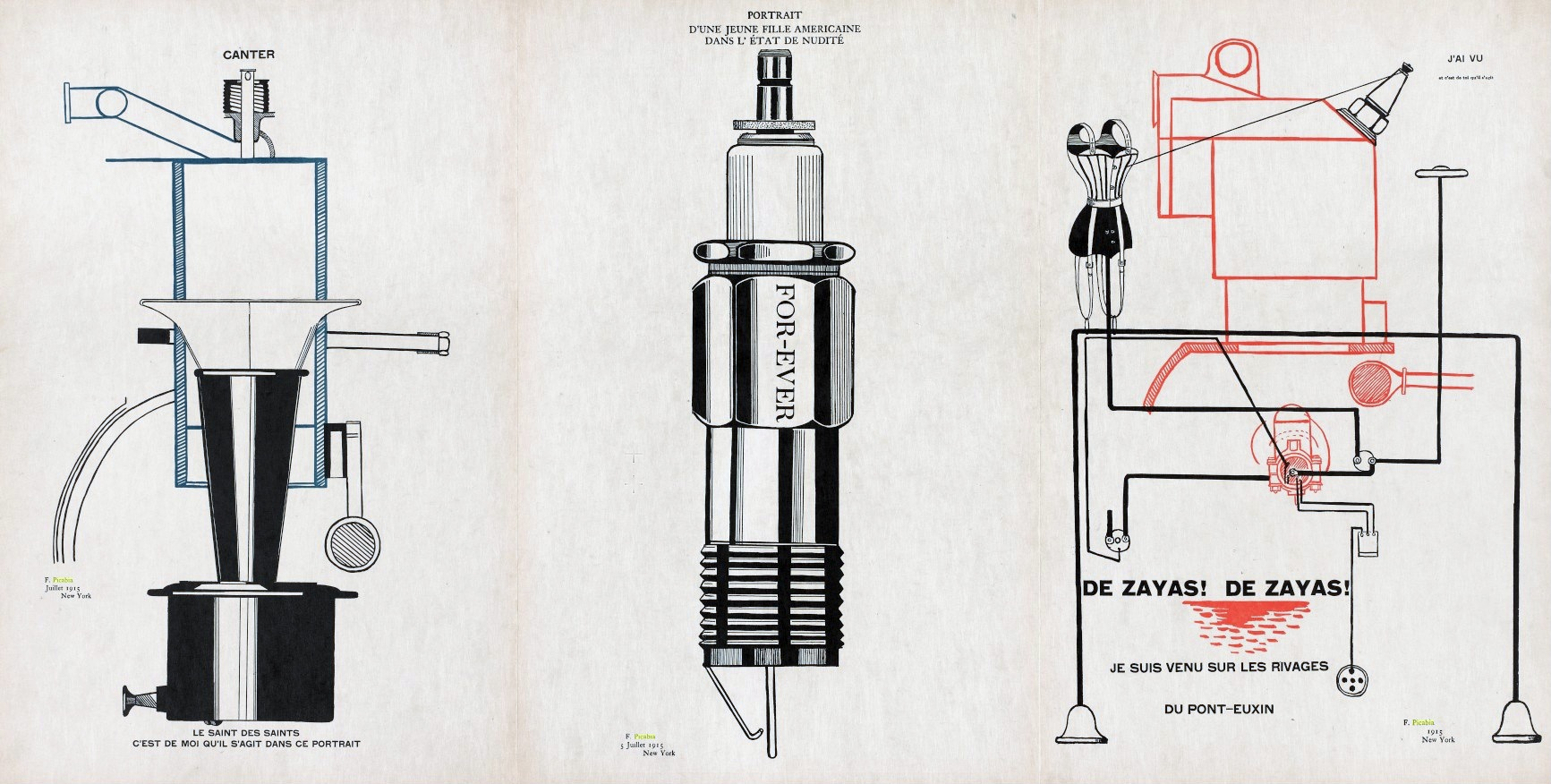
Francis Picabia: left, Le saint des saints c'est de moi qu'il s'agit dans ce portrait, 1 July 1915; center, Portrait d'une jeune fille americaine dans l'état de nudité, 5 July 1915; right, J'ai vu et c'est de toi qu'il s'agit, De Zayas! De Zayas! Je suis venu sur les rivages du Pont-Euxin, New York, 1915

Dada (/ˈdɑːdɑː/) or Dadaism was an international art movement that developed in the context of World War I, its aftermath, and the Futurist movement. First established in Zürich, Switzerland, it later quickly spread to Berlin, Paris, New York City and a variety of artistic centers in Europe and Asia. The Dada movement focused on rejecting prevailing ideas surrounding art, and more broadly in society. The Dada movement's principles were first collected in Hugo Ball's Dada Manifesto in 1916. Ball is seen as the founder of the Dada movement. Other key figures in the movement included Emmy Hennings, Jean Arp, Johannes Baader, Marcel Duchamp, Max Ernst, Elsa von Freytag-Loringhoven, George Grosz, Raoul Hausmann, John Heartfield, Hannah Höch, Richard Huelsenbeck, Francis Picabia, Man Ray, Hans Richter, Kurt Schwitters, Sophie Taeuber-Arp, Tristan Tzara, and Beatrice Wood, among others. The movement influenced later styles, like the avant-garde and downtown music movements, and groups including Surrealism, nouveau réalisme, pop art, and Fluxus.

In turn, it itself also did not arise out of nowhere. 35 years earlier, an art movement similar to Dadaism in general, called Fumism, was known in Paris; some of the old Fumists were in close contact with the new Dadaists.

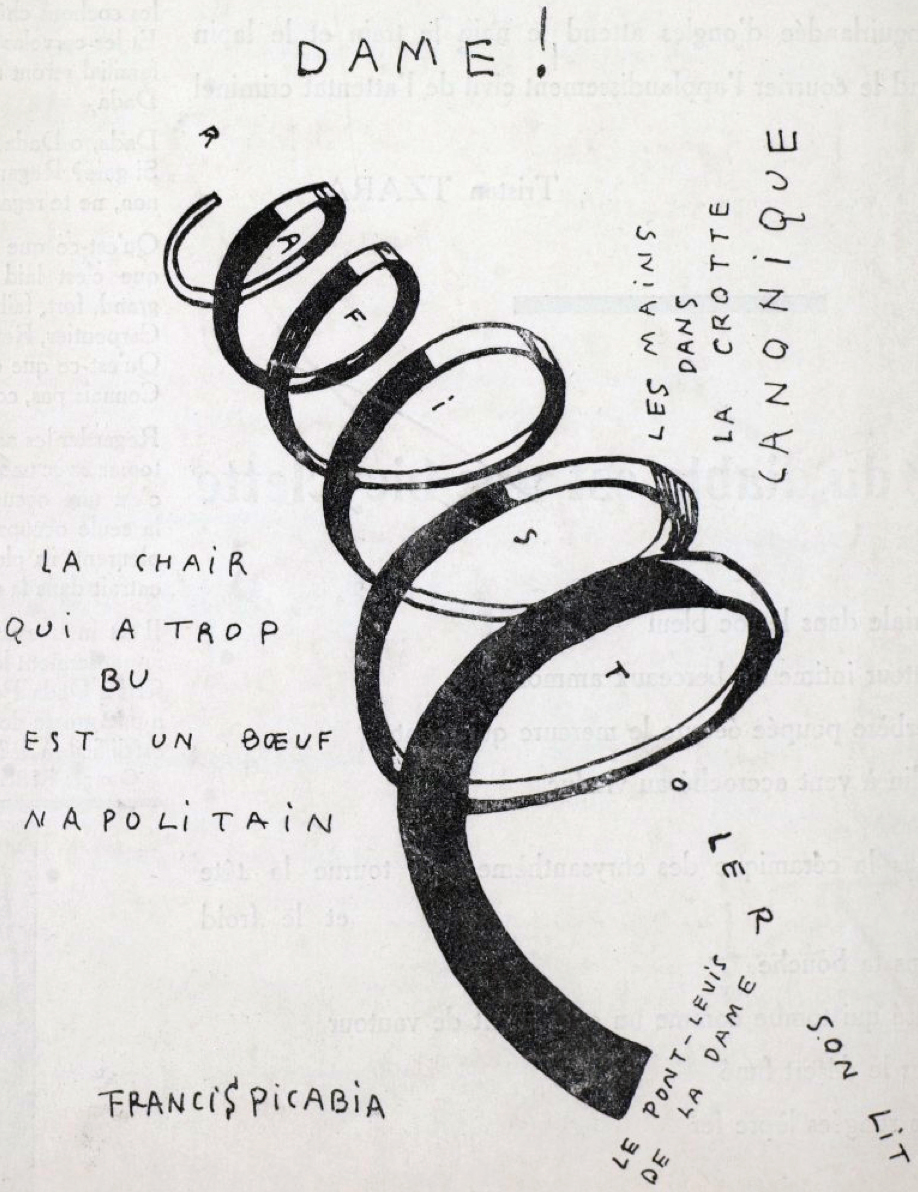
Francis Picabia, Dame! Illustration for the cover of the periodical Dadaphone, n. 7, Paris, March 1920

== Etymology ==
There is no single agreed origin for the name Dada. One widely repeated story holds that Richard Huelsenbeck jabbed a paper knife into a dictionary, landing on the French word dada ("hobby horse"). Other accounts emphasize its infantile sound or its multilingual neutrality, aligning with the movement's internationalism. The related label "anti‑art"—often associated with Duchamp and the readymade—denotes practices that challenge accepted definitions of art.

== Style ==
Dada coalesced among émigré artists and writers in neutral Switzerland during 1916, with Hugo Ball and Emmy Hennings founding the Cabaret Voltaire as a venue for nightly performances and manifestos. Participants framed their activity as a protest against war, nationalism, and cultural conformity, adopting strategies of nonsense, chance, and ridicule to negate prevailing aesthetic values.

Dadaists worked across media, including sound poetry, collage and photomontage (especially in Berlin), and the use of found objects and assemblage. In New York and Paris, Marcel Duchamp's readymades became emblematic of Dada's anti‑art stance.

=== Techniques ===
Dadaism also blurred the line between literary and visual arts:

Dada is the groundwork to abstract art and sound poetry, a starting point for performance art, a prelude to postmodernism, an influence on pop art, a celebration of antiart to be later embraced for anarcho-political uses in the 1960s and the movement that laid the foundation for Surrealism.

==== Collage ====
The Dadaists imitated the techniques developed during the cubist movement through the pasting of cut pieces of paper items, but extended their art to encompass items such as transportation tickets, maps, plastic wrappers, etc. to portray aspects of life, rather than representing objects viewed as still life. They also invented the "chance collage" technique, involving dropping torn scraps of paper onto a larger sheet and then pasting the pieces wherever they landed.

==== Cut-up technique ====
Cut-up technique is an extension of collage to words themselves, Tristan Tzara describes this in the Dada Manifesto:

TO MAKE A DADAIST POEM
Take a newspaper.
Take some scissors.
Choose from this paper an article of the length you want to make your poem.
Cut out the article.
Next carefully cut out each of the words that makes up this article and put them all in a bag.
Shake gently.
Next take out each cutting one after the other.
Copy conscientiously in the order in which they left the bag.
The poem will resemble you.
And there you are – an infinitely original author of charming sensibility, even though unappreciated by the vulgar herd.

==== Photomontage ====
Raoul Hausmann, ABCD (self-portrait), a photomontage from 1923 to 1924

The Dadaists – the "monteurs" (mechanics) – used scissors and glue rather than paintbrushes and paints to express their views of modern life through images presented by the media. A variation on the collage technique, photomontage utilized actual or reproductions of real photographs printed in the press. In Cologne, Max Ernst used images from the First World War to illustrate messages of the destruction of war. Although the Berlin photomontages were assembled, like engines, the (non)relationships among the disparate elements were more rhetorical than real.

==== Assemblage ====
The assemblages were three-dimensional variations of the collage – the assembly of everyday objects to produce meaningful or meaningless (relative to the war) pieces of work including war objects and trash. Objects were nailed, screwed or fastened together in different fashions. Assemblages could be seen in the round or could be hung on a wall.

==== Readymades ====
Marcel Duchamp began to view the manufactured objects of his collection as objects of art, which he called "readymades". He would add signatures and titles to some, converting them into artwork that he called "readymade aided" or "rectified readymades". Duchamp wrote: "One important characteristic was the short sentence which I occasionally inscribed on the 'readymade.' That sentence, instead of describing the object like a title, was meant to carry the mind of the spectator towards other regions more verbal. Sometimes I would add a graphic detail of presentation which in order to satisfy my craving for alliterations, would be called 'readymade aided.'" One such example of Duchamp's readymade works is the urinal that was turned onto its back, signed "R. Mutt", titled Fountain, and submitted to the Society of Independent Artists exhibition that year, though it was not displayed.

Many young artists in America embraced the theories and ideas espoused by Duchamp. Robert Rauschenberg in particular was very influenced by Dadaism and tended to use found objects in his collages as a means of dissolving the boundary between high and low culture.

=== Poetry ===
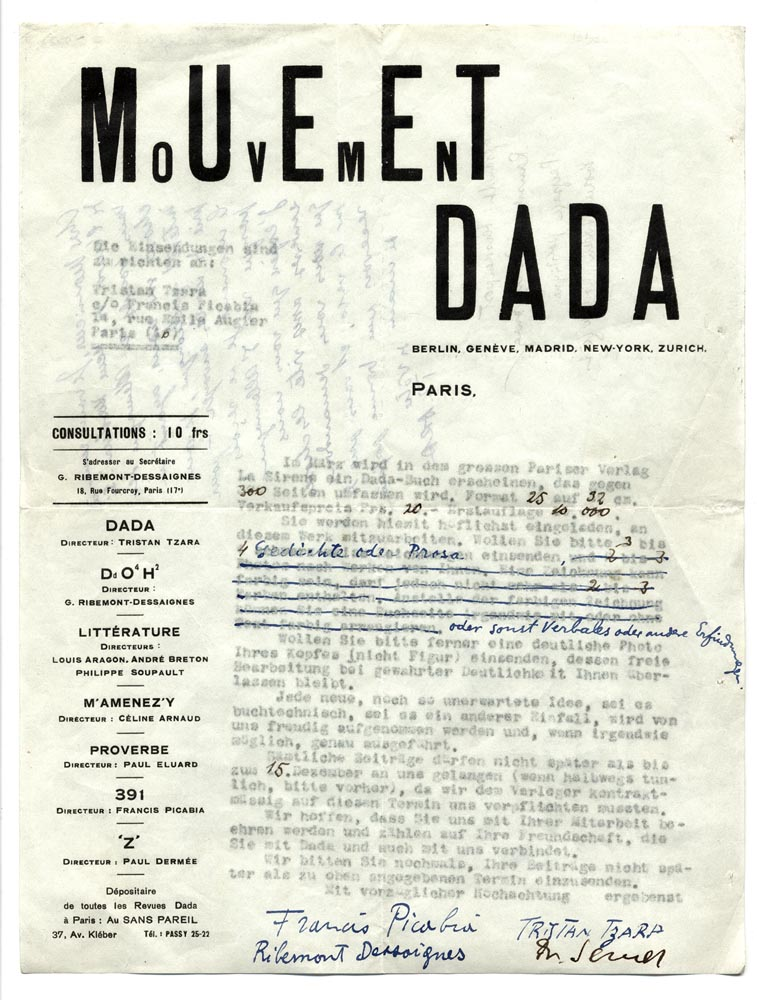
Dadaglobe solicitation form letter signed by Francis Picabia, Tristan Tzara, Georges Ribemont-Dessaignes, and Walter Serner, c. week of November 8, 1920. This example was sent from Paris to Alfred Vagts in Munich.

Dadaists used shock, nihilism, negativity, paradox, randomness, subconscious forces, anti-poetry and antinomianism to subvert established traditions in the aftermath of the Great War. Tzara's 1920 manifesto proposed cutting words from a newspaper and randomly selecting fragments to write poetry, a process in which the synchronous universe itself becomes an active agent in creating the art. A poem written using this technique would be a "fruit" of the words that were clipped from the article.

In literary arts, Dadaists focused on poetry, particularly the so-called sound poetry invented by Hugo Ball. Dadaist poems attacked traditional conceptions of poetry, including structure, order, as well as the interplay of sound and the meaning of language. For Dadaists, the existing system by which information is articulated robs language of its dignity. The dismantling of language and poetic conventions are Dadaist attempts to restore language to its purest and most innocent form: "With these sound poem, we wanted to dispense with a language which journalism had made desolate and impossible."

Simultaneous poems (or poèmes simultanés) were recited by a group of speakers who, collectively, produced a chaotic and confusing set of voices. These poems are considered manifestations of modernity including advertising, technology, and conflict. Unlike movements such as Expressionism, Dadaism did not take a negative view of modernity and the urban life. The chaotic urban and futuristic world is considered natural terrain that opens up new ideas for life and art.

=== Music ===
Dada was not confined to the visual and literary arts; its influence reached into sound and music. These movements exerted a pervasive influence on 20th-century music, especially on mid-century avant-garde composers based in New York—among them Edgard Varèse, Stefan Wolpe, John Cage, and Morton Feldman. Kurt Schwitters developed what he called sound poems, while Francis Picabia and Georges Ribemont-Dessaignes composed Dada music performed at the Festival Dada in Paris on 26 May 1920. Other composers such as Erwin Schulhoff, Hans Heusser and Alberto Savinio all wrote Dada music, while members of Les Six collaborated with members of the Dada movement and had their works performed at Dada gatherings. Erik Satie also dabbled with Dadaist ideas during his career.

== Circulation ==
Dada's principal centres included Zürich (1916–), New York (c. 1915 – c. 1923), Berlin (c. 1918 – c. 1920), Cologne and Hannover (c. 1919 – c. 1920), and Paris (c. 1919 – c. 1924), each with distinct emphases—from performance and poetry in Zürich to politically charged photomontage in Berlin and object‑based experiments in New York. By the mid‑1920s, Dada's energies in Paris merged into Surrealism, while its strategies of appropriation, performance, and institutional critique continued to inform later avant‑gardes.

Dada circulated through journals and small‑press publications (e.g., Cabaret Voltaire, Dada, 391) posters, cards, and broadsides that combined texts, images, and typographic experiments.

== History ==
Dada emerged from a period of artistic and literary movements like Futurism, Cubism and Expressionism; centered mainly in Italy, France and Germany respectively, in those years. However, unlike the earlier movements, Dada was able to establish a broad base of support, giving rise to a movement that was international in scope. Its adherents were based in cities all over the world including New York, Zürich, Berlin, Paris and others. There were regional differences like an emphasis on literature in Zürich and political protest in Berlin.

Some sources propose a Romanian origin, arguing that Dada was an offshoot of a vibrant artistic tradition that transposed to Switzerland when a group of Jewish modernist artists, including Tristan Tzara, Marcel Janco, and Arthur Segal settled in Zürich. Before World War I, similar art had already existed in Bucharest and other Eastern European cities; it is likely that Dada's catalyst was the arrival in Zürich of artists like Tzara and Janco.

Prominent Dadaists published manifestos, but the movement was loosely organized and there was no central hierarchy. On 14 July 1916, Ball originated the seminal Dada Manifesto. Tzara wrote a second Dada manifesto, considered important Dada reading, which was published in 1918. Tzara's manifesto articulated the concept of "Dadaist disgust"—the contradiction implicit in avant-garde works between the criticism and affirmation of modernist reality. In the Dadaist perspective, modern art and culture are considered a type of fetishization where the objects of consumption (including organized systems of thought like philosophy and morality) are chosen, much like a preference for cake or cherries, to fill a void.

The shock and scandal the movement inflamed was deliberate; Dadaist magazines were banned and their exhibits closed. Some of the artists even faced imprisonment. These provocations were part of the entertainment but, over time, audiences' expectations eventually outpaced the movement's capacity to deliver. As the artists' well-known "sarcastic laugh" started to come from the audience, the provocations of Dadaists began to lose their impact. Dada was an active movement during years of political turmoil from 1916 when European countries were actively engaged in World War I, the conclusion of which, in 1918, set the stage for a new political order.

=== Zürich ===
Hannah Höch, Cut with the Kitchen Knife through the Last Epoch of Weimar Beer-Belly Culture in Germany, 1919, collage of pasted papers, 90×144 cm, Nationalgalerie, Staatliche Museen zu Berlin

The origins of the Dada movement is commonly accepted by most art historians and those who lived during this period to have identified with the Cabaret Voltaire (housed inside the Holländische Meierei bar in Zürich) co-founded by poet and cabaret singer Emmy Hennings and Hugo Ball.

The name Cabaret Voltaire was a reference to the French philosopher Voltaire, whose novel Candide mocked the religious and philosophical dogmas of the day.

Ball and Hennings invited artists "whatever their orientation" and contributions "of all kinds," setting the stage for a diverse output. Opening night was attended by Ball, Hennings, Tzara, Jean Arp, and Janco. These artists along with others like Sophie Taeuber, Richard Huelsenbeck and Hans Richter started putting on performances at the Cabaret Voltaire and using art to express their disgust with the war and the interests that inspired it.

Having left Germany and Romania during World War I, the artists arrived in politically neutral Switzerland. They used abstraction to fight against the social, political, and cultural ideas of that time. They used shock art, provocation, and "vaudevillian excess" to subvert the conventions they believed had caused the Great War. The Dadaists believed those ideas to be a byproduct of bourgeois society that was so apathetic it would wage war against itself rather than challenge the status quo:

We had lost confidence in our culture. Everything had to be demolished. We would begin again after the tabula rasa. At the Cabaret Voltaire we began by shocking common sense, public opinion, education, institutions, museums, good taste, in short, the whole prevailing order.

— Marcel Janco

Ball said that Janco's mask and costume designs, inspired by Romanian folk art, made "the horror of our time, the paralyzing background of events" visible. According to Ball, performances were accompanied by a "balalaika orchestra playing delightful folk-songs." Often influenced by African music, arrhythmic drumming and jazz were common at Dada gatherings.

After the cabaret closed down, Dada activities moved on to a new gallery, and Hugo Ball left for Bern. Tzara began a relentless campaign to spread Dada ideas. He bombarded French and Italian artists and writers with letters, and soon emerged as the Dada leader and master strategist. The Cabaret Voltaire re-opened, and is still in the same place at the Spiegelgasse 1 in the Niederdorf.

Zürich Dada, with Tzara at the helm, published the art and literature review Dada beginning in July 1917, with five editions from Zürich and the final two from Paris.

Other artists, such as André Breton and Philippe Soupault, created "literature groups to help extend the influence of Dada".

After the fighting of the First World War had ended in the armistice of November 1918, most of the Zürich Dadaists returned to their home countries, and some began Dada activities in other cities. Others, such as the Swiss native Sophie Taeuber, would remain in Zürich into the 1920s.

=== Berlin ===
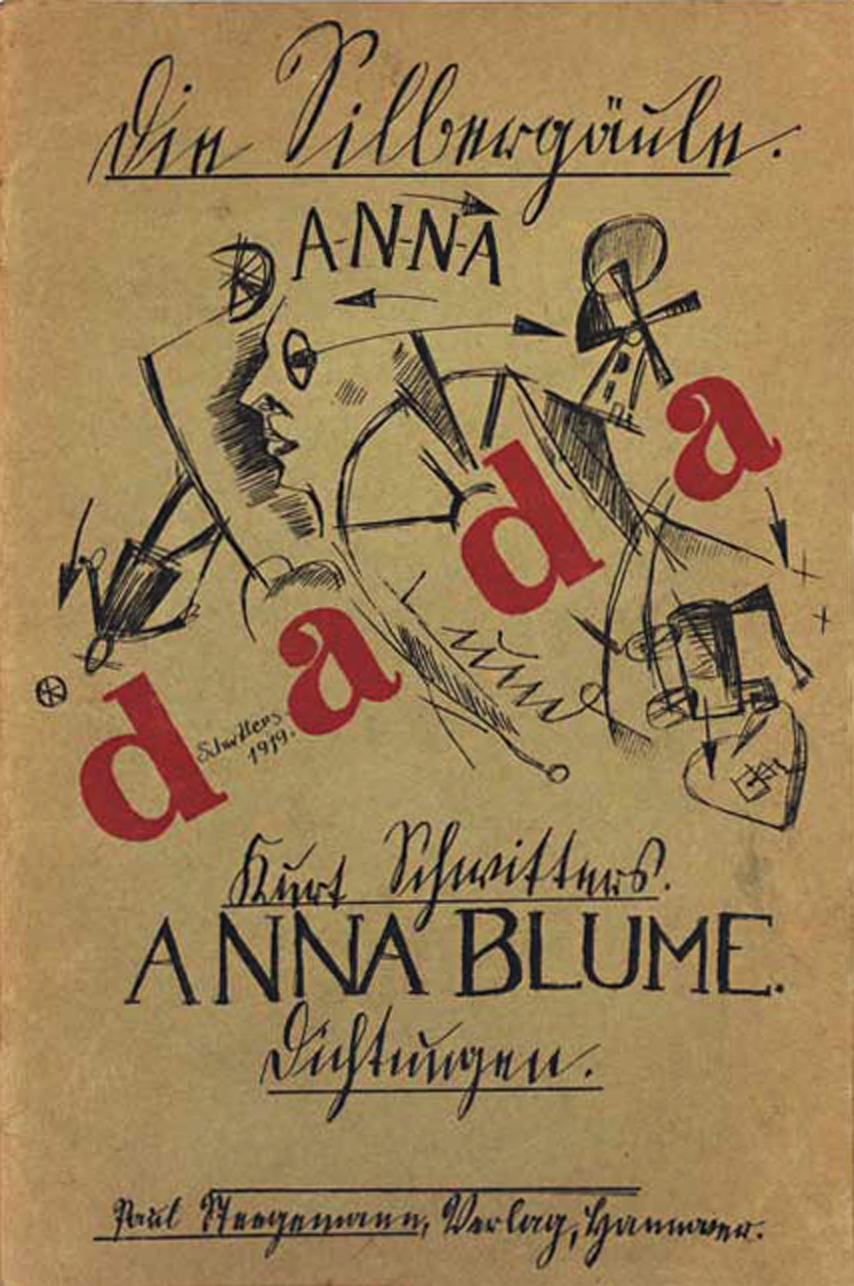
Cover of Anna Blume, Dichtungen, 1919

"Berlin was a city of tightened stomachers, of mounting, thundering hunger, where hidden rage was transformed into a boundless money lust, and men's minds were concentrating more and more on questions of naked existence... Fear was in everybody's bones" – Richard Hülsenbeck

Raoul Hausmann, who helped establish Dada in Berlin, published his manifesto Synthethic Cino of Painting in 1918 where he attacked Expressionism and the art critics who promoted it. Dada is envisioned in contrast to art forms, such as Expressionism, that appeal to viewers' emotional states: "the exploitation of so-called echoes of the soul". In Hausmann's conception of Dada, new techniques of creating art would open doors to explore new artistic impulses. Fragmented use of real world stimuli allowed an expression of reality that was radically different from other forms of art:

A child's discarded doll or a brightly colored rag are more necessary expressions than those of some ass who seeks to immortalize himself in oils in finite parlors.

— Raoul Hausmann

The groups in Germany were not as strongly anti-art as other groups. Their activity and art were more political and social, with corrosive manifestos and propaganda, satire, public demonstrations and overt political activities. The intensely political and war-torn environment of Berlin had a dramatic impact on the ideas of Berlin Dadaists. Conversely, New York's geographic distance from the war spawned its more theoretically driven, less political nature. According to Hans Richter, a Dadaist who was in Berlin yet "aloof from active participation in Berlin Dada", several distinguishing characteristics of the Dada movement there included: "its political element and its technical discoveries in painting and literature"; "inexhaustible energy"; "mental freedom which included the abolition of everything"; and "members intoxicated with their own power in a way that had no relation to the real world", who would "turn their rebelliousness even against each other".

In February 1918, while the Great War was approaching its climax, Huelsenbeck gave his first Dada speech in Berlin, and he produced a Dada manifesto later in the year. Following the October Revolution in Russia, by then out of the war, Hannah Höch and George Grosz used Dada to express communist sympathies. Grosz, together with John Heartfield, Höch and Hausmann developed the technique of photomontage during this period. Johannes Baader, the uninhibited Oberdada, was the "crowbar" of the Berlin movement's direct action according to Hans Richter and is credited with creating the first giant collages, according to Raoul Hausmann.

After the war, the artists published a series of short-lived political magazines and held the First International Dada Fair, 'the greatest project yet conceived by the Berlin Dadaists', in the summer of 1920. As well as work by the main members of Berlin Dada (Grosz, Raoul Hausmann, Hannah Höch, Johannes Baader, Huelsenbeck and Heartfield), the exhibition also included the work of Otto Dix, Francis Picabia, Jean Arp, Max Ernst, Rudolf Schlichter, Johannes Baargeld and others. In all, over 200 works were exhibited, surrounded by incendiary slogans, some of which also ended up written on the walls of the Nazi's Entartete Kunst exhibition in 1937. Despite high ticket prices, the exhibition lost money, with only one recorded sale.

The Berlin group published periodicals such as Club Dada, Der Dada, Everyman His Own Football, and Dada Almanach. They also established a political party, the Central Council of Dada for the World Revolution.

=== Cologne ===
In Cologne, Ernst, Baargeld, and Arp launched a controversial Dada exhibition in 1920 which focused on nonsense and anti-bourgeois sentiments. Cologne's Early Spring Exhibition was set up in a pub, and required that participants walk past urinals while being read lewd poetry by a woman in a communion dress. The police closed the exhibition on grounds of obscenity, but it was re-opened when the charges were dropped.

=== New York ===
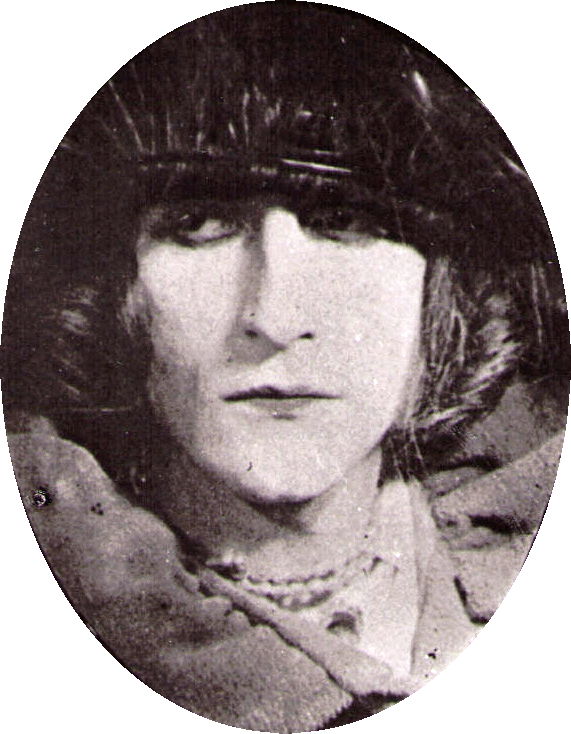
Rrose Sélavy, the alter ego of Dadaist Marcel Duchamp

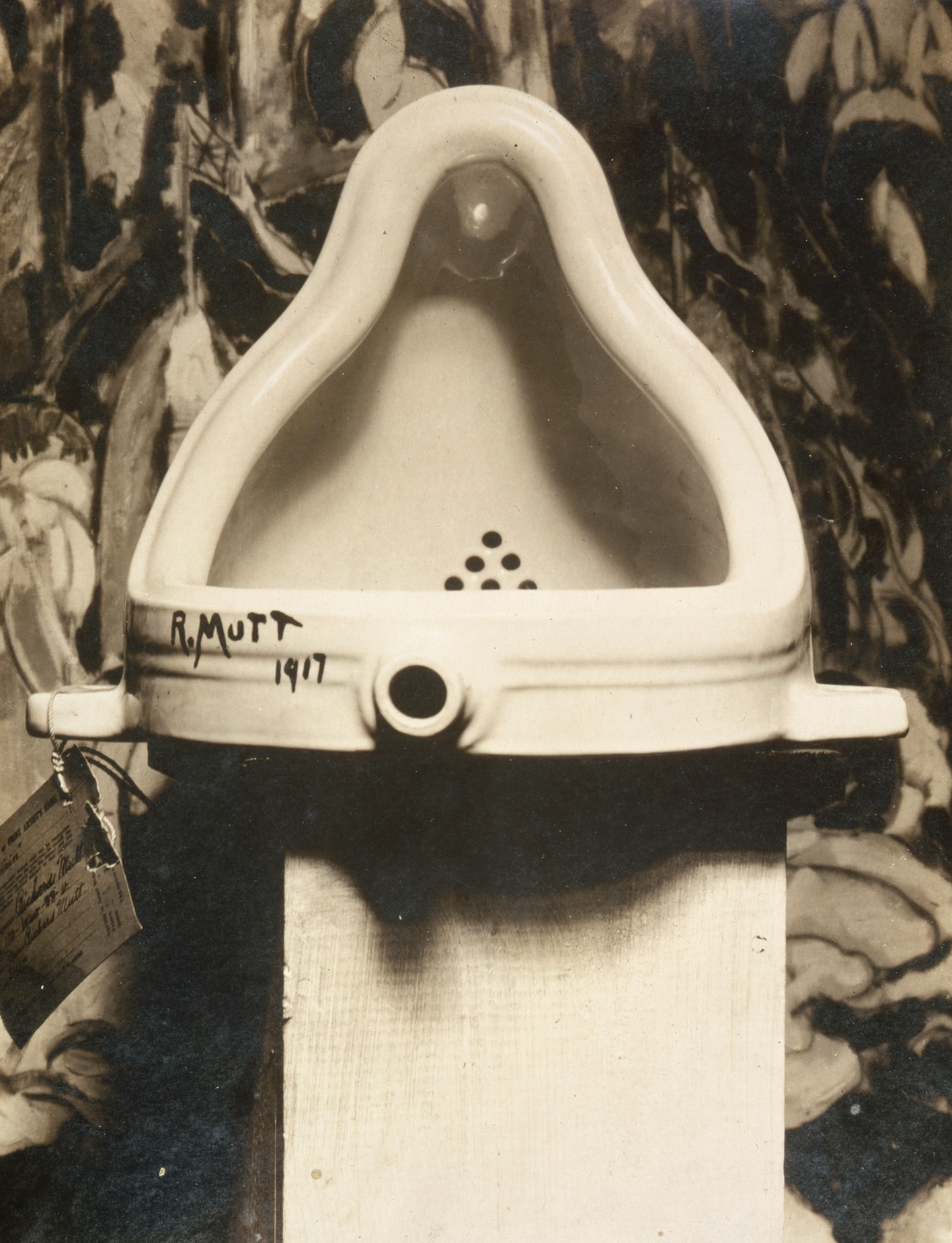
Marcel Duchamp, Fountain, 1917; photograph by Alfred Stieglitz

Like Zürich, New York City was a refuge for writers and artists from the First World War. Soon after arriving from France in 1915, Marcel Duchamp and Francis Picabia met American artist Man Ray. By 1916 the three of them became the center of radical anti-art activities in the United States. American Beatrice Wood, who had been studying in France, soon joined them, along with Elsa von Freytag-Loringhoven. Arthur Cravan, fleeing conscription in France, was also in New York for a time. Much of their activity centered in Alfred Stieglitz's gallery, 291, and the home of Walter and Louise Arensberg.

The New Yorkers, though not particularly organized, called their activities Dada, but they did not issue manifestos. They issued challenges to art and culture through publications such as The Blind Man, Rongwrong, and New York Dada in which they criticized the traditionalist basis for museum art. New York Dada lacked the disillusionment of European Dada and was instead driven by a sense of irony and humor. In his book Adventures in the arts: informal chapters on painters, vaudeville and poets Marsden Hartley included an essay on "The Importance of Being 'Dada' ".

During this time Duchamp began exhibiting "readymades" (everyday objects found or purchased and declared art) such as a bottle rack, and was active in the Society of Independent Artists. In 1917 he submitted the now famous Fountain, a urinal signed R. Mutt, to the Society of Independent Artists exhibition but they rejected the piece. First an object of scorn within the arts community, the Fountain has since become almost canonized by some as one of the most recognizable modernist works of sculpture. Art world experts polled by the sponsors of the 2004 Turner Prize, Gordon's gin, voted it "the most influential work of modern art".

As recent scholarship documents, the work is still controversial. Duchamp indicated in a 1917 letter to his sister that a female friend was centrally involved in the conception of this work: "One of my female friends who had adopted the pseudonym Richard Mutt sent me a porcelain urinal as a sculpture." The piece is in line with the scatological aesthetics of Duchamp's neighbour, the Baroness Elsa von Freytag-Loringhoven. In an attempt to "pay homage to the spirit of Dada" a performance artist named Pierre Pinoncelli made a crack in a replica of The Fountain with a hammer in January 2006; he also urinated on it in 1993.

Picabia's travels tied New York, Zürich and Paris groups together during the Dadaist period. For seven years he also published the Dada periodical 391 in Barcelona, New York City, Zürich, and Paris from 1917 through 1924.

By 1921, most of the original players moved to Paris where Dada had experienced its last major incarnation.

=== Paris ===
Man Ray, c. 1921–22, Rencontre dans la porte tournante, published on the cover of Der Sturm, Volume 13, Number 3, 5 March 1922

Man Ray, c. 1921–22, Dessin (Drawing), published on page 43 of Der Sturm, Volume 13, Number 3, 5 March 1922

The French avant-garde kept abreast of Dada activities in Zürich with regular communications from Tristan Tzara (whose pseudonym means "sad in country", a name chosen to protest the treatment of Jews in his native Romania), who exchanged letters, poems, and magazines with Guillaume Apollinaire, André Breton, Max Jacob, Clément Pansaers, and other French writers, critics and artists.

Paris had arguably been the classical music capital of the world since the advent of musical Impressionism in the late 19th century. One of its practitioners, Erik Satie, collaborated with Picasso and Cocteau in a mad, scandalous ballet called Parade. First performed by the Ballets Russes in 1917, it succeeded in creating a scandal but in a different way than Stravinsky's Le Sacre du printemps had done almost five years earlier. This was a ballet that was clearly parodying itself, something traditional ballet patrons would obviously have serious issues with.

Dada in Paris surged in 1920 when many of the originators converged there. Inspired by Tzara, Paris Dada soon issued manifestos, organized demonstrations, staged performances and produced a number of journals (the final two editions of Dada, Le Cannibale, and Littérature featured Dada in several editions.)

The first introduction of Dada artwork to the Parisian public was at the Salon des Indépendants in 1921. Jean Crotti exhibited works associated with Dada including a work entitled, Explicatif bearing the word Tabu. In the same year Tzara staged his Dadaist play The Gas Heart to howls of derision from the audience. When it was re-staged in 1923 in a more professional production, the play provoked a theatre riot (initiated by André Breton) that heralded the split within the movement that was to produce Surrealism. Tzara's last attempt at a Dadaist drama was his "ironic tragedy" Handkerchief of Clouds in 1924.

=== Netherlands ===
In the Netherlands, the Dada movement centered mainly around Theo van Doesburg, best known for establishing the De Stijl movement and magazine of the same name. Van Doesburg mainly focused on poetry, and included poems from many well-known Dada writers in De Stijl such as Hugo Ball, Hans Arp and Kurt Schwitters. Van Doesburg and Thijs Rinsema (a cordwainer and artist in Drachten) became friends of Schwitters, and together they organized the so-called Dutch Dada campaign in 1923, where van Doesburg promoted a leaflet about Dada (entitled What is Dada?), Schwitters read his poems, Vilmos Huszár demonstrated a mechanical dancing doll and Nelly van Doesburg (Theo's wife), played avant-garde compositions on piano.

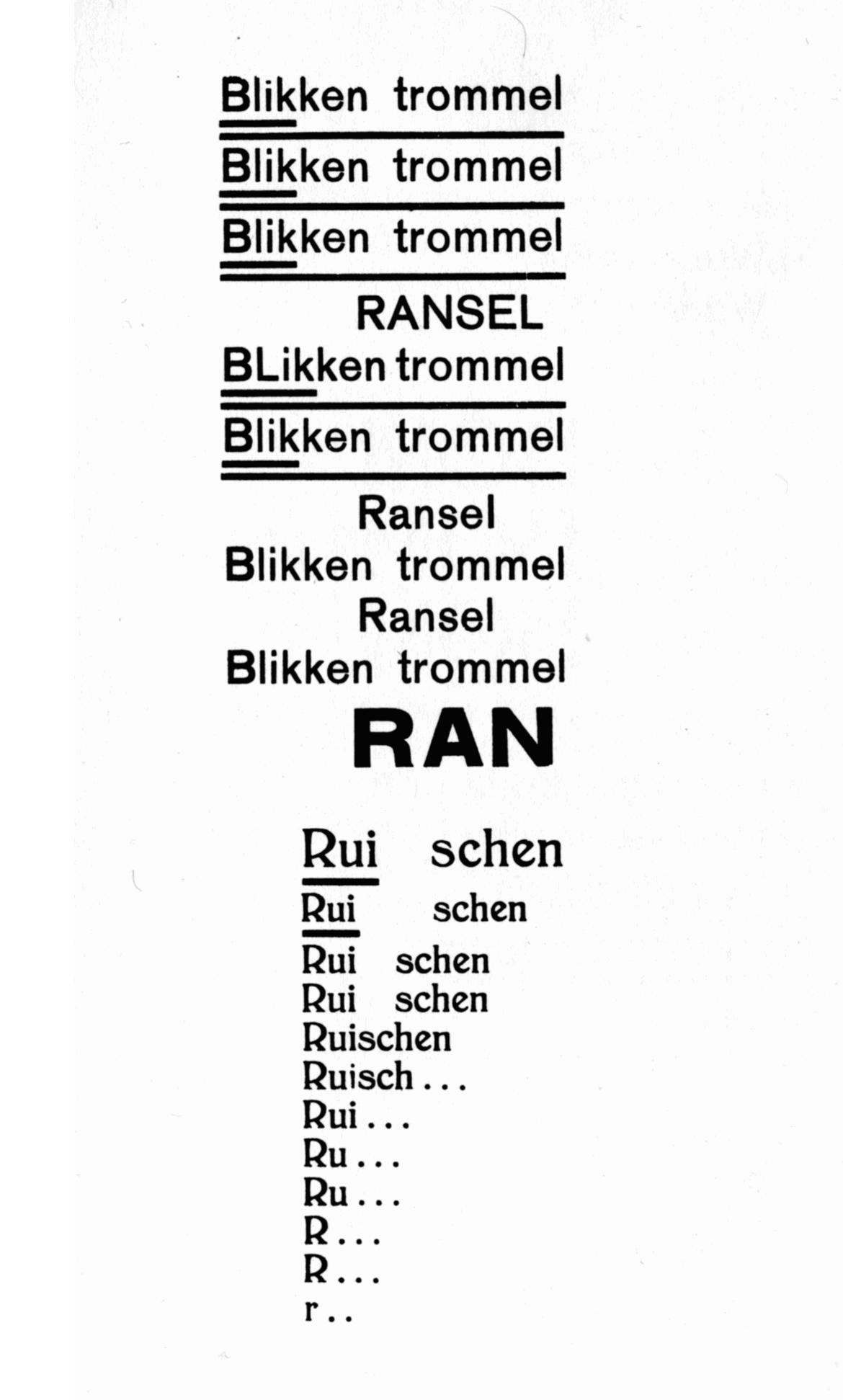
A Bonset sound-poem, "Passing troop", 1916

Van Doesburg wrote Dada poetry himself in De Stijl, although under a pseudonym, I.K. Bonset, which was only revealed after his death in 1931. 'Together' with I.K. Bonset, he also published a short-lived Dutch Dada magazine called Mécano (1922–23). Another Dutchman identified by K. Schippers in his study of the movement in the Netherlands was the Groningen typographer H. N. Werkman, who was in touch with van Doesburg and Schwitters while editing his own magazine, The Next Call (1923–6). Two more artists mentioned by Schippers were German-born and eventually settled in the Netherlands. These were Otto van Rees, who had taken part in the liminal exhibitions at the Café Voltaire in Zürich, and Paul Citroen.

=== Georgia ===
Though Dada itself was unknown in Georgia until at least 1920, from 1917 until 1921, a group of poets called themselves Le Degré 41", or "Le Degré Quarante et Un" (English, "The 41st Degree") (referring both to the latitude of Tbilisi, Georgia and to the Celsius temperature of a high fever [equal to 105.8 Fahrenheit]) organized along Dadaist lines. The most important figure in this group was Iliazd (Ilia Zdanevich), whose radical typographical designs visually echo the publications of the Dadaists.

After his flight to Paris in 1921, he collaborated with Dadaists on publications and events. For example, when Tristan Tzara was banned from holding seminars in Théâtre Michel in 1923, Iliazd booked the venue on his behalf for the performance, "The Bearded Heart Soirée", and designed the flyer.

=== Yugoslavia ===
In Yugoslavia, alongside the new art movement Zenitism, there was significant Dada activity between 1920 and 1922, run mainly by Dragan Aleksić and including work by Mihailo S. Petrov, Ljubomir Micić and Branko Ve Poljanski. Aleksić used the term "Yougo-Dada" and is known to have been in contact with Raoul Hausmann, Kurt Schwitters, and Tristan Tzara.

=== Italy ===
The Dada movement in Italy, based in Mantua, was met with distaste and failed to make a significant impact in the world of art. It published a magazine for a short time and held an exhibition in Rome, featuring paintings, quotations from Tristan Tzara, and original epigrams such as "True Dada is against Dada". One member of this group was Julius Evola, who went on to become an eminent scholar of occultism, as well as a right-wing philosopher.

=== Japan ===
A prominent Dada group in Japan was Mavo. The group was founded in July 1923 by Tomoyoshi Murayama and Yanase Masamu; they were later joined by Tatsuo Okada. Other prominent artists were Jun Tsuji, Eisuke Yoshiyuki, Shinkichi Takahashi and Katué Kitasono.

Dada, an iconic character from the Ultra Series. In addition to being named after the art movement, his design is inspired by it, featuring sharp lines and a monochromatic colour scheme inspired by Go and chessboards.

In Tsuburaya Productions's Ultra Series, an alien named Dada was inspired by the Dadaism movement, with said character first appearing in episode 28 of the 1966 tokusatsu series, Ultraman, its design by character artist Toru Narita. Dada's design is primarily monochromatic, and features numerous sharp lines and alternating black and white stripes, in reference to the movement and, in particular, to chessboard and Go patterns. On May 19, 2016, in celebration to the 100 year anniversary of Dadaism in Tokyo, the Ultra Monster was invited to meet the Swiss Ambassador Urs Bucher.

Butoh, the Japanese dance-form originating in 1959, can be considered to have direct connections to the spirit of the Dada movement, as Tatsumi Hijikata, one of Butoh's founders, "was influenced early in his career by Dadaism".

=== Russia ===
Dada in itself was relatively unknown in Russia; however, avant-garde art was widespread due to the Bolsheviks' revolutionary agenda. The Nichevoki, a literary group sharing Dadaist ideals achieved infamy after one of its members suggested that Vladimir Mayakovsky should go to the "Pampushka" (Pameatnik Pushkina – Pushkin monument) on the "Tverbul" (Tverskoy Boulevard) to clean the shoes of anyone who desired it, after Mayakovsky declared that he was going to cleanse Russian literature. For more information on Dadaism's influence upon Russian avant-garde art, see the book Russian Dada 1914–1924.

== Legacy ==
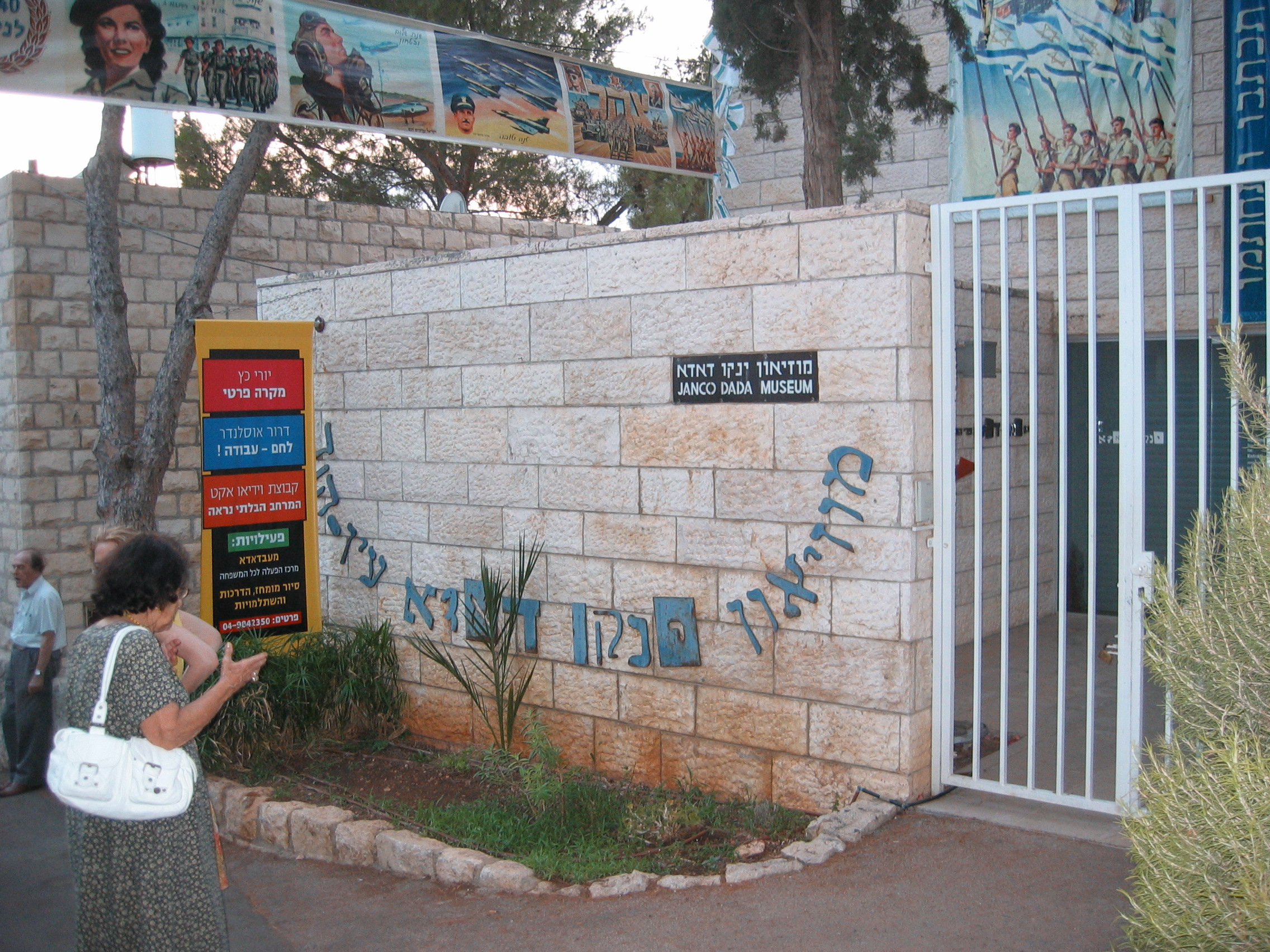
The Janco Dada Museum, named after Marcel Janco, in Ein Hod, Israel

While broadly based, the movement was unstable. By 1924 in Paris, Dada was melding into Surrealism, and artists had gone on to other ideas and movements, including Surrealism, social realism and other forms of modernism. Some theorists argue that Dada was actually the beginning of postmodern art.

By the dawn of the Second World War, many of the European Dadaists had emigrated to the United States. Some (Otto Freundlich, Walter Serner) died in death camps under Adolf Hitler, who actively persecuted the kind of "degenerate art" that he considered Dada to represent. The movement became less active as post-war optimism led to the development of new movements in art and literature.

Dada is a named influence and reference of various anti-art and political and cultural movements, including the Situationist International and culture jamming groups like the Cacophony Society. Upon breaking up in July 2012, anarchist pop band Chumbawamba issued a statement which compared their own legacy with that of the Dada art movement.

At the same time that the Zürich Dadaists were making noise and spectacle at the Cabaret Voltaire, Lenin was planning his revolutionary plans for Russia in a nearby apartment. Tom Stoppard used this coincidence as a premise for his play Travesties (1974), which includes Tzara, Lenin, and James Joyce as characters. French writer Dominique Noguez imagined Lenin as a member of the Dada group in his tongue-in-cheek Lénine Dada (1989).

The former building of the Cabaret Voltaire fell into disrepair until it was occupied from January to March 2002, by a group proclaiming themselves Neo-Dadaists, led by Mark Divo. The group included Jan Thieler, Ingo Giezendanner, Aiana Calugar, Lennie Lee, and Dan Jones. After their eviction, the space was turned into a museum dedicated to the history of Dada. The work of Lee and Jones remained on the walls of the new museum.

Several notable retrospectives have examined the influence of Dada upon art and society. In 1967, a large Dada retrospective was held in Paris. In 2006, the Museum of Modern Art in New York City mounted a Dada exhibition in partnership with the National Gallery of Art in Washington, D.C., and the Centre Pompidou in Paris. The LTM label has released a large number of Dada-related sound recordings, including interviews with artists such as Tzara, Picabia, Schwitters, Arp, and Huelsenbeck, and musical repertoire including Satie, Ribemont-Dessaignes, Picabia, and Nelly van Doesburg.

Musician Frank Zappa was a self-proclaimed Dadaist after learning of the movement:

In the early days, I didn't even know what to call the stuff my life was made of. You can imagine my delight when I discovered that someone in a distant land had the same idea—AND a nice, short name for it.

David Bowie adapted William S. Burroughs' cut-up technique for writing lyrics. Kurt Cobain also admittedly used this method for many of his Nirvana lyrics, including In Bloom.

== Artists ==
- Hugo Ball (1886–1927), Germany, Switzerland
- Emmy Hennings (1885–1948), Germany, Switzerland
- Dragan Aleksić (1901–1958), Yugoslavia
- Louis Aragon (1897–1982), France
- Jean Arp (1886–1966), Germany, France
- Sophie Taeuber-Arp (1889–1943) Switzerland, France
- Johannes Baader (1875–1955), Germany
- Johannes Theodor Baargeld (1892–1927), Germany
- André Breton (1896–1966), France
- John Covert (1882–1960), US
- Jean Crotti (1878–1958), France
- Otto Dix (1891–1969), Germany
- Theo van Doesburg (1883–1931) Netherlands
- Marcel Duchamp (1887–1968), France
- Suzanne Duchamp (1889–1963), France
- Viking Eggeling (1880–1925), Sweden
- Paul Éluard (1895–1952), France
- Max Ernst (1891–1976), Germany, US
- Julius Evola (1898–1974), Italy
- George Grosz (1893–1959), Germany, France, US
- Raoul Hausmann (1886–1971), Germany
- John Heartfield (1891–1968), Germany, USSR, Czechoslovakia, UK
- Hannah Höch (1889–1978), Germany
- Richard Huelsenbeck (1892–1974), Germany
- Georges Hugnet (1906–1974), France
- Marcel Janco (1895–1984), Romania, Israel
- Elsa von Freytag-Loringhoven (1874–1927), Germany, US
- Clément Pansaers (1885–1922), Belgium
- Francis Picabia (1879–1953), France
- Man Ray (1890–1976), France, US
- Georges Ribemont-Dessaignes (1884–1974), France
- Hans Richter, Germany, Switzerland
- Juliette Roche Gleizes (1884–1980), France
- Kurt Schwitters (1887–1948), Germany
- Walter Serner (1889–1942), Austria
- Philippe Soupault (1897–1990), France
- Tristan Tzara (1896–1963), Romania, France
- Beatrice Wood (1893–1998), US
- Mümtaz Zeki Taşkın (1915–2013), Turkey
- Ercüment Behzat Lav (1903–1984), Turkey

=== Women of Dada ===
The vital contributions of female artists to the Dada movement were often reduced to their personal relationships with male Dadaists; thus, they were not written about as extensively in their own right. Notable mentions other than the artists below include: Suzanne Duchamp, Elsa von Freytag-Loringhoven, Beatrice Wood, Clara Tice, and Ella Bergmann-Michel.

==== Emmy Hennings ====
Emmy Hennings was a German performer, poet, and co-founder of the Cabaret Voltaire in Zurich alongside her partner, Hugo Ball. Her origin story is portrayed in the novel What Was Beautiful and Good by Jill Blocker, which shows her not just as a muse or side figure to the male artists around her, but as an artist in her own right—sensitive, spiritual, and ahead of her time.

Suddenly my great-grandmother is on YouTube – although for a long time she was only considered an enchanted groupie.

— Julian Schütt, great-godson of Emmy Hennings

Various international foundations, including the Emmy Hennings Gesellschaft in Flensburg, Germany, promotes and protects her legacy.

==== Hannah Höch ====
Hannah Höch of Berlin is considered to be the only female Dadaist in Berlin at the time of the movement. During this time, she was in a relationship with Raoul Hausmann who also was a Dada artist. She channeled the same anti-war and anti-government (Weimar Republic) in her works but brought out a feminist lens on the themes. With her works primarily of collage and photomontage, she often used precise placement or detailed titles to callout the misogynistic ways she and other women were treated.

==== Sophie Taeuber-Arp ====
Sophie Taeuber-Arp was a Swiss artist, teacher, and dancer who produced various types of fine art and handicraft pieces. While married to Dadaist Jean Arp, Taeuber-Arp was known in the Dada community for her performative dancing. As such, she worked with choreographer Rudolf von Laban and was written by Tristan Tzara for her dancing skills.

==== Mina Loy ====
London-born Mina Loy was known for being active in the literary sector of the New York Dada scene. She spent time writing poetry, creating Dada magazines, and acting and writing in plays. She contributed writing to Dada journal The Blind Man and Marcel Duchamp's Rongwrong.

== See also ==
- Art intervention
- Dadaglobe
- List of Dadaists
- Épater la bourgeoisie
- Happening
- Incoherents
- Tête Dada
- Transgressive art
- Destruction Was My Beatrice, history by Jed Resula
- Corecore

== Filmography ==
- 1968: Germany-DADA: An Alphabet of German DADAism on YouTube, Documentary by Universal Education, Presented By Kartes Video Communications, 56 Minutes
- 1971: DADA 'Archives du XXe siècle' on YouTube, Une émission produite par Jean José Marchand, réalisée par Philippe Collin et Hubert Knapp, Ce documentaire a été diffusé pour la première fois sur la RTF le 28.03.1971, 267 min.
- 2016: Das Prinzip Dada, Documentary by Marina Rumjanzewa, Schweizer Radio und Fernsehen (Sternstunde Kunst), 52 Minutes (in German)
- 2016 Dada Art Movement History – "Dada on Tour" on YouTube, Bruno Art Group in collaboration with Cabaret Voltaire & Art Stage Singapore 2016, 27 minutes
