= Wieland Herzfelde =

German publisher and writer (1896–1988)

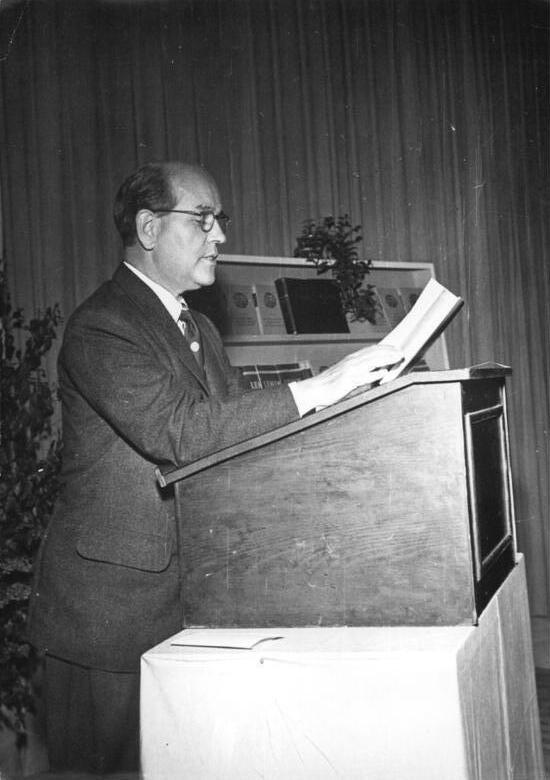
Herzfelde in 1952

Wieland Herzfelde (né Herzfeld; 11 April 1896 – 23 November 1988) was a German publisher and writer. He is particularly known for his links with German avant-garde art and Marxist thought, and was the brother of the photo montage artist John Heartfield, with whom he often worked.

== Life ==
Herzfelde was born in Weggis. His parents were Franz Held (whose surname was an abbreviation of his original name Herzfeld), an anarchist writer, and political activist Alice Stolzenberg. Orphaned since 1899, in 1914 he followed his older brother Helmut, later known as John Heartfield, to Berlin. In 1916, he founded the artistic journal Neue Jugend, and the following year started the publishing house Malik-Verlag, known for its works on art and Marxism. Towards the end of World War I, he briefly worked on propaganda films for the German government.

After the war, he continued his publishing activities and also founded an art gallery, Grosz-Galerie, and a bookshop, as well as helping to organize the First International Dada Fair in 1920, which included works by Hans Arp, Max Ernst, Georg Scholz, Johannes Theodor Baargeld, and Otto Dix.

Following Hitler's rise to power, he fled to Prague in 1933, later moving to London, and in 1939 to the USA where he published works by exiled German writers. In 1949 he returned to what was by then East Germany, becoming a professor of literature at the University of Leipzig; he also wrote poetry and fiction, and worked as a translator. He died in 1988 and was buried in the Dorotheenstadt cemetery in Berlin.
