= Hannah Höch =

German artist (1889–1978)

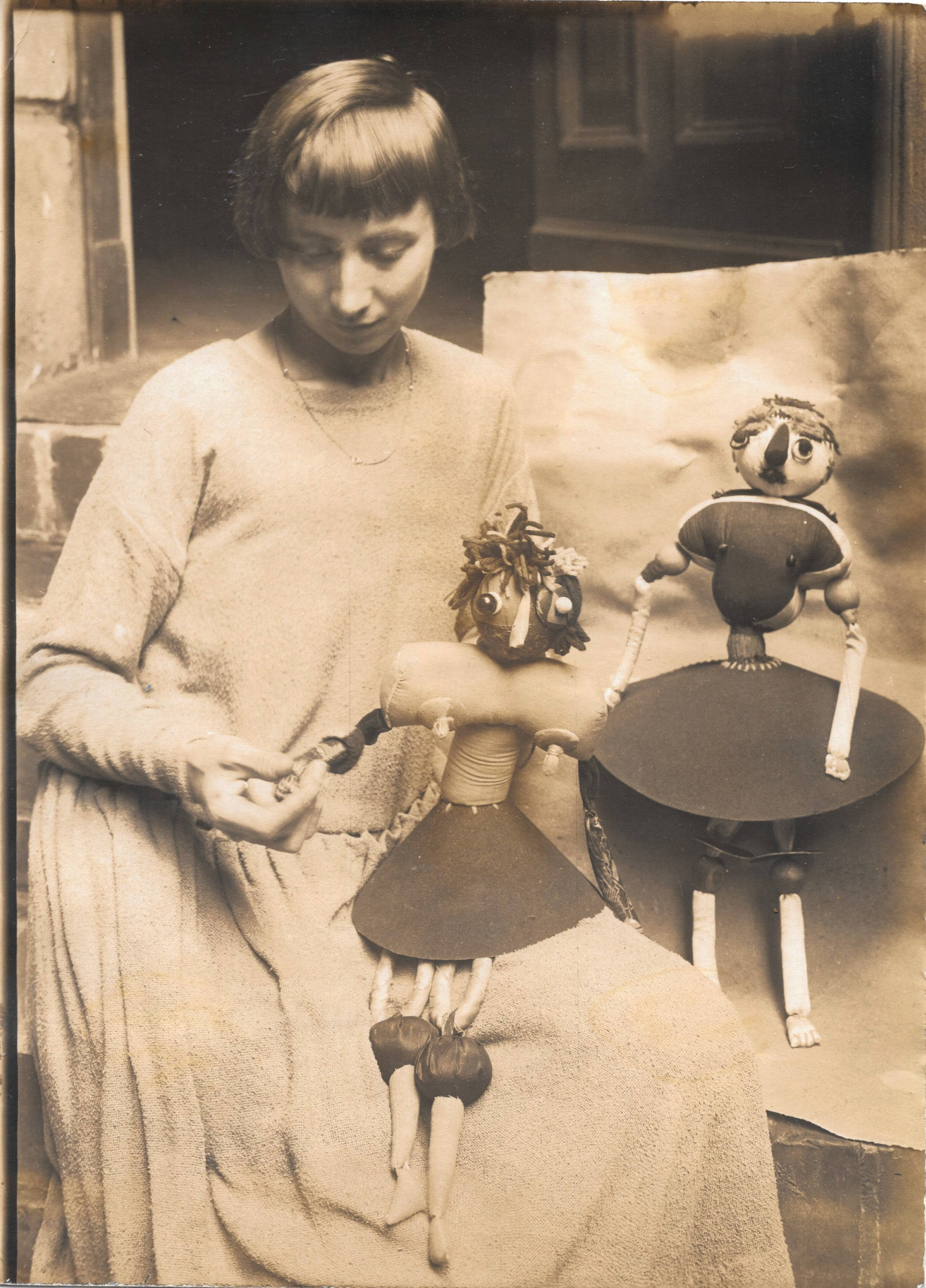
- Höch with her puppets, Dada-Messe, Berlin, 1920
- Born: Anna Therese Johanne Höch; 1 November 1889; Gotha, German Empire
- Died: 31 May 1978 (aged 88); Berlin, Germany
- Known for: Photomontage, collage
- Movement: Dada
- Spouse: Kurt Matthies 1938 (m. 1944, divorced)
- Partners: Raoul Hausmann (1915–1922); Til Brugman (1926–1935)

Hannah Höch (German: [hœç]; 1 November 1889 – 31 May 1978) was a German Dada artist. She is best known for her work of the Weimar period, when she was one of the originators of photomontage. Photomontage, or fotomontage, is a type of collage in which the pasted items are actual photographs, or photographic reproductions pulled from the press and other widely produced media.

An important element in Höch's work was the intention to dismantle the fable and dichotomy that existed in the concept of the "New Woman": an energetic, professional, and androgynous woman, who is ready to take her place as man's equal. Her interest in the topic was in how the dichotomy was structured, as well as in who structures social roles.

Other key themes in Höch's works were androgyny, political discourse, and shifting gender roles. These themes all interacted to create a feminist discourse surrounding Höch's works, which encouraged the liberation and agency of women during the Weimar Republic (1919–1933) and continuing through to today.

== Biography ==
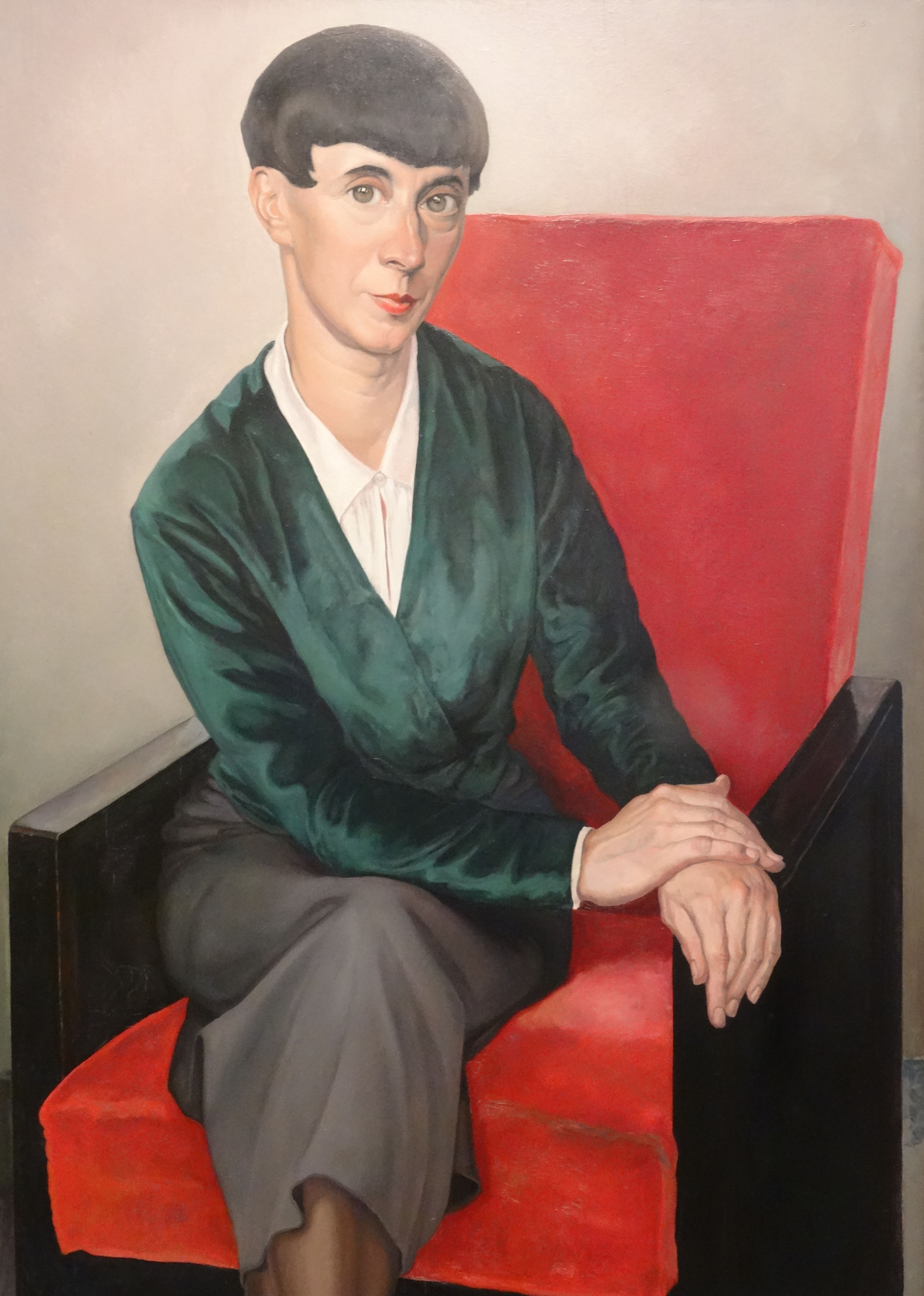
Portrait of Hannah Höch (1933), by Chris Lebeau

Hannah Höch was born Anna Therese Johanne Höch in Gotha, Germany. Although she attended school, domesticity took precedence in the Höch household. In 1904, Höch was taken out of the Höhere Töchterschule in Gotha to care for her youngest sibling, Marianne. In 1912 she began classes at the college of Applied Arts in Berlin under the guidance of glass designer Harold Bergen. She chose the curriculum in glass design and graphic arts, rather than fine arts, to please her father.

In 1914, at the start of World War I, she left the school and returned home to Gotha to work with the Red Cross. In 1915 she returned to Berlin, where she entered the graphics class of Emil Orlik at the National Institute of the Museum of Arts and Crafts. Also in 1915, Höch began an intimate relationship with Raoul Hausmann, a later activist of the Berlin Dada movement. Höch's involvement with the Berlin Dadaists began in earnest in 1917. Höch, as the only woman among the Berlin group, was singled out for her self-sufficiency, masculine presentation, and bisexuality, as she consistently addressed themes of the "New Woman" who was free to vote, to begin and enjoy sexual encounters and to seek financial independence.

From 1916 to 1926, she worked in the handicrafts department for the publisher Ullstein Verlag, designing dress, embroidery, lace, and handiwork designs for Die Dame (The Lady) and Die Praktische Berlinerin (The Practical Berlin Woman). The influence of this early work and training can be seen in a number of her collages made in the late 1910s and early- to mid-1920s in which she incorporated sewing patterns and needlework designs. From 1926 to 1929 she lived and worked in the Netherlands. Höch formed many influential friendships and professional relationships over the years with individuals such as Kurt Schwitters, Nelly van Doesburg, Theo van Doesburg, Sonia Delaunay, László Moholy-Nagy, and Piet Mondrian, among others. Höch, along with Hausmann, was one of the first pioneers of the art form that would come to be known as photomontage.

Hannah Höch, Cut with the Kitchen Knife Dada through the Beer-Belly of the Weimar Republic, 1919, collage of pasted papers, 90 x 144 cm, Staatliche Museen, Berlin

=== Personal life and relationships ===
Art historian Maria Makela has characterized Höch's affair with Raoul Hausmann as "stormy", and identifies the central cause of their altercations—some of which ended in violence—in Hausmann's refusal to leave his wife. He reached the point of fantasizing about killing Höch. Hausmann continually disparaged Höch not only for her desire to marry him, which he described as a "Bourgeois" inclination, but also for her opinions on art. Hausmann's hypocritical stance on women's emancipation spurred Höch to write "a caustic short story" entitled "The Painter" in 1920, the subject of which is "an artist who is thrown into an intense spiritual crisis when his wife asks him to do the dishes." Hausmann repeatedly implied that the only way Höch could reach her full potential, as a woman and in their relationship, was to have a child with him. Höch herself wanted children, but both times she found she was pregnant with Hausmann's child, in May 1916 and January 1918, she had an abortion.

Höch ended her seven-year relationship with Raoul Hausmann in 1922. In 1926, she began a relationship with the Dutch writer and linguist Mathilda ('Til') Brugman, whom Höch met through mutual friends Kurt and Helma Schwitters. By autumn of 1926, Höch moved to The Hague to live with Brugman, where they lived until 1929, at which time they moved to Berlin. Höch and Brugman's relationship lasted nine years, until 1935. They did not explicitly define their relationship as lesbian, instead choosing to refer to it as a private love relationship. In 1935, Höch began a relationship with Kurt Matthies, to whom she was married from 1938 to 1944.

=== Later years ===
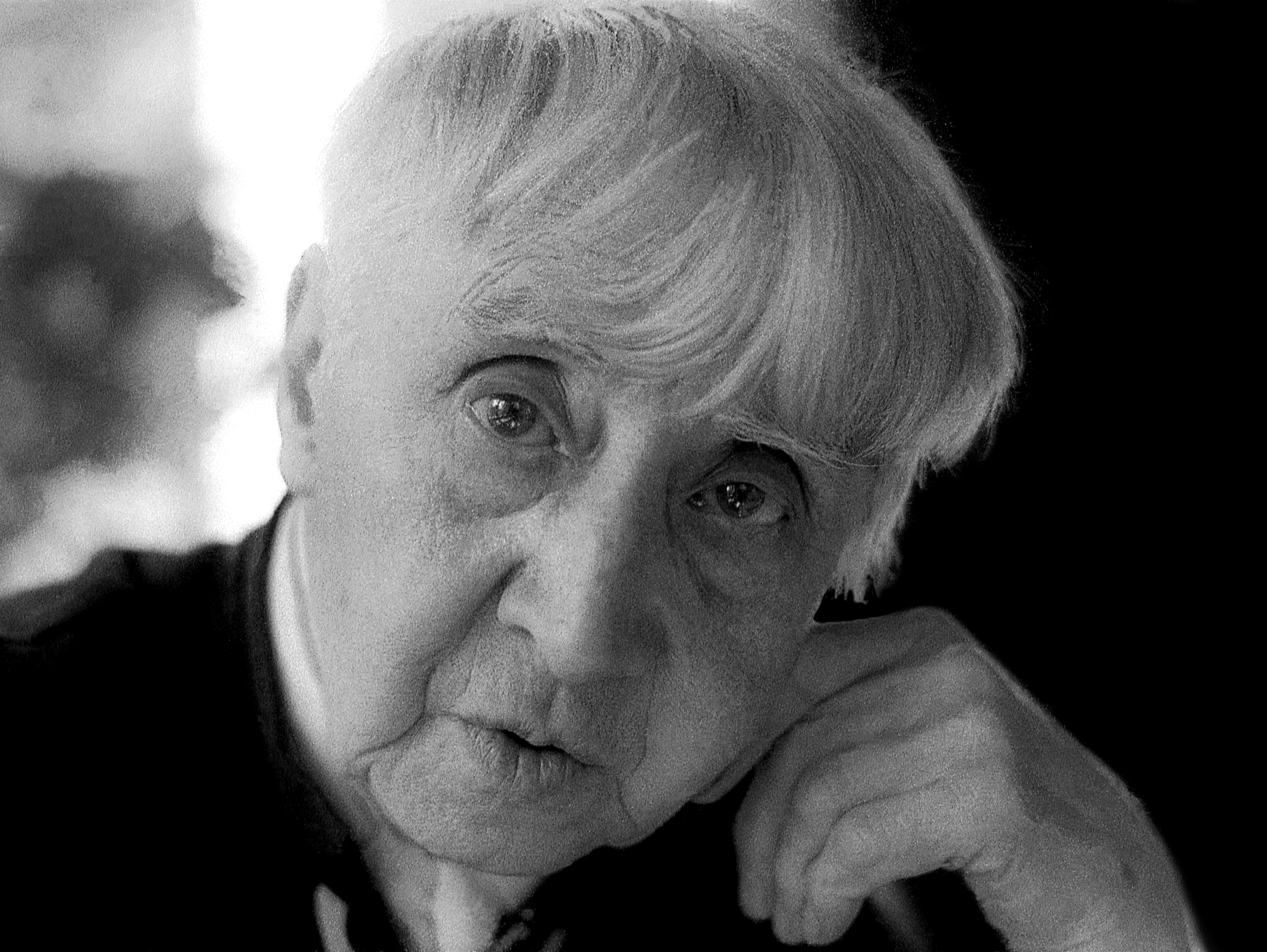
Höch in 1974

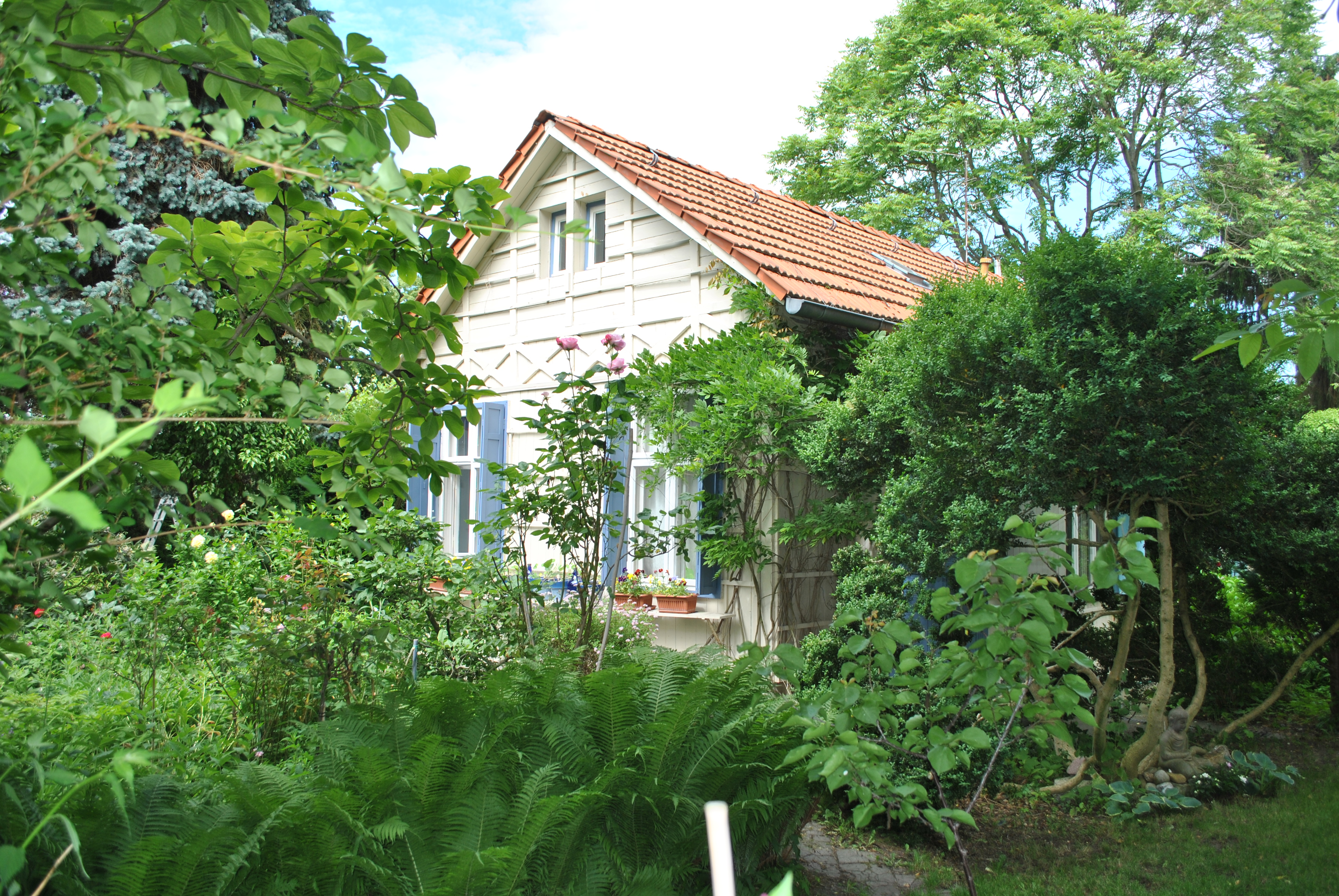
Hannah Höch's Gardenhouse, Berlin, Germany

Höch spent the years of the Third Reich in Berlin, Germany, keeping a low profile. She was the last member of the Berlin Dada group to remain in Germany during this period. She bought and lived in a small garden house in Berlin-Heiligensee, a remote area on the outskirts of Berlin.

She married businessman and pianist Kurt Matthies in 1938 and divorced him in 1944. She suffered from the Nazi censorship of art, and her work was deemed "degenerate art", which made it even more difficult for her to show her works. Though her work was not as acclaimed after the war as it had been before the rise of the Third Reich, she continued to produce her photomontages and exhibit them internationally until her death in 1978, in Berlin. Her house and garden can be visited at the annual Tag des offenen Denkmals.

The 128th anniversary of her birthday was commemorated on 1 November 2017 by a Google Doodle.

== Dada ==
Dada was an artistic movement formed in 1916 in Zurich, Switzerland. The movement rejected monarchy, militarism, and conservatism and was enmeshed in an "anti-art" sentiment. Dadaists felt that art should have no boundaries or restrictions and that it can be whimsical and playful. These sentiments arose after the Great War, which caused society to question the role of government, and to reject militarism after seeing the atrocities of war. Many Dada pieces were critical of the Weimar Republic and its failed attempt at creating a democracy in post-war (WWI) Germany.

The Dada movement had a tone of fundamental negativity in regards to bourgeois society. The term "dada" has no actual meaning – it is a childlike word used to describe the lack of reason or logic in much of the artwork. The main artists involved in the movement in Berlin include George Grosz, John Heartfield and Raoul Hausmann. Some claim that it was Höch's relationship with Hausmann that allowed her into the sphere of Dada artists. George Grosz and John Heartfield were against Höch exhibiting with them in the 1920 First International Dada Fair, for example, and only allowed her participation after Raoul Hausmann argued for her inclusion. Later, Hausmann still attempted to deny Höch a place in the movement, by writing in his memoirs that "she was never a member of the club." She nonetheless held the title of "Dadasophin" within the movement.

Höch is best known for her photomontages. These collages, which borrowed images from popular culture and utilized the dismemberment and reassembly of images, were a central element of the Dada aesthetic, though other Dadaists were hesitant to accept her work due to inherent sexism in the movement. Her work added "a wryly feminist note" to the Dadaist philosophy of disdain towards bourgeois society, but both her identity as a woman and her feminist subject matter contributed to her never being fully accepted by the male Dadaists.

Like other Dada artists, Höch's work also came under close scrutiny by the Nazis as it was considered degenerate. The Nazis put to a stop her 1932 intended exhibition at the Bauhaus (a German art school). They were not only offended by her aesthetic, but also by her political messages and by the mere fact that she was a woman.

Her images portrayed androgynous individuals, which the Nazis despised. Nazi ideology appreciated artwork that portrayed the ideal Aryan German man and woman. The images Höch used often contrasted this look, or used it to make a point about society, such as in the piece Das Schöne Mädchen ("The Beautiful Girl"). The Nazis preferred a traditional clear rational style of artwork that did not require deep thought or analysis. They felt that the chaos of the Dada style bordered on pathological. Höch went into seclusion during the Nazi years and was later able to return to the art world after the fall of the Third Reich.

=== Photomontage ===
"Höch's photomontages display the chaos and combustion of Berlin's visual culture from a particularly female perspective" (Makholm). "Höch was not only a rare female practicing prominently in the arts in the early part of the twentieth century—near unique as a female active in the Dada group in Berlin that coalesced in her time—she also consciously promoted the idea of women working creatively more generally in society. She explicitly addressed in her pioneering artwork in the form of photomontage the issue of gender and the figure of woman in modern society" (The Art Story).

In these montages, Höch gathered images and text from popular forms of media, such as newspapers and magazines, and combined them in often uncanny ways, which were able to express her stances on the important social issues of her time. The fact that images she included in her pieces were pulled from current newspapers and magazines gave her messages validity.

The power of the works came from the intentional dismemberment and reconstruction of the images. This alludes to the notion that current issues can be viewed through different lenses. This technique was originally thought of as extremely leftist and revolutionary, but by the 1930s, it had become an accepted mode of design linked with modernity and consumerism. Thus began the notion that mass culture and fine arts could be combined in a meaningful way. The ambiguity in her work was integral to the way which she addressed issues of sexuality and gender. These complex constructions of genders allow women to embrace both their masculine and feminine attributes. This leads to an intensified sense of individualism. Photomontage is a large part of Höch's legacy as an artist.

=== Women in Dada ===
The role that women played in Dada has been the object of research in recent years, including in scholarly works by Ruth Hemus, Nadia Sawleson-Gorse and Paula K. Kamenish. While the Dadaists, including Georg Schrimpf, Franz Jung, and Johannes Baader, "paid lip service to women's emancipation," they were clearly reluctant to include a woman among their ranks. Hans Richter described Höch's contribution to the Dada movement as the "sandwiches, beer and coffee she managed somehow to conjure up despite the shortage of money." Raoul Hausmann even suggested that Höch get a job to support him financially, despite her being the only one from her close circle to have a stable income.

On her exclusion and the sexism of the Dadaists, Höch responded, "None of these men were satisfied with just an ordinary woman. But neither were they included to abandon the (conventional) male/masculine morality toward the woman. Enlightened by Freud, in protest against the older generation. . . they all desired this 'New Woman' and her groundbreaking will to freedom. But—they more or less brutally rejected the notion that they, too, had to adopt new attitudes. . . This led to these truly Strinbergian dramas that typified the private lives of these men."

Höch was the lone woman among the Berlin Dada group. Emmy Hennings and Sophie Taeuber were also important figures in Zurich, while others, including Beatrice Wood and Baroness Else von Freytag-Loringhoven, participated in New York. Höch references the hypocrisy of the Berlin Dada group and German society as a whole in her photomontage, Da-Dandy. Höch also wrote about the hypocrisy of men in the Dada movement in her short essay "The Painter", published in 1920, in which she examines the artistic crisis which ensues after a man is asked to do the dishes by his wife. This is an example of how Höch was able to transcend one particular medium and render her observations in yet another mode.

Höch's time at Ullstein Verlag working with magazines targeted at women made her acutely aware of the difference between women as portrayed in media and their reality, and her workplace provided her with many of the images that served as raw material for her own work. She was also critical of the institution of marriage, often depicting brides as mannequins and children, reflecting the socially pervasive idea of women as incomplete people with little control over their lives.

Höch worked for the magazine Ullstein Verlag between 1916 and 1926 in the department which focused on design patterns, handicrafts, knitting and embroidery, artistic forms within the domestic sphere which were considered appropriate for women. "The pattern designs Höch created for Ullstein's women's magazines and her early experiments with modernist abstraction were integrally related, blurring the boundaries between traditionally masculine and feminine modes of form and expression" (Makholm). She wrote a Manifesto of Modern Embroidery in 1918, which spoke to the modern woman, empowering her to take pride in her work. "She now drew on this experience and on a large body of advertising material she had collected, in images that were unprecedented in their insights into the way society 'constructs' women" (Hudson).

Höch considered herself a part of the women's movement in the 1920s, as shown in her depiction of herself, alongside multiple political and cultural figures, in the large-scale photomontage Schnitt mit dem Küchenmesser DADA durch die letzte Weimarer Bierbauchkulturepoche Deutschlands ("Cut with the Kitchen Knife Dada through the Last Weimar Beer-Belly Cultural Epoch in Germany") (1919–20). Her pieces also commonly combine male and female traits into one unified being. During the era of the Weimar Republic, "mannish women were both celebrated and castigated for breaking down traditional gender roles." In this artwork Hoch metaphorically equates her scissors, used to cut images or her collages, to the kitchen knife. This is used to symbolize cutting through the dominant domains of politics and public life in Weimer culture. Her androgynous characters may also have been related to her bisexuality and attraction to masculinity in women (that is, attraction to the female form paired with stereotypically masculine characteristics).

== Works ==
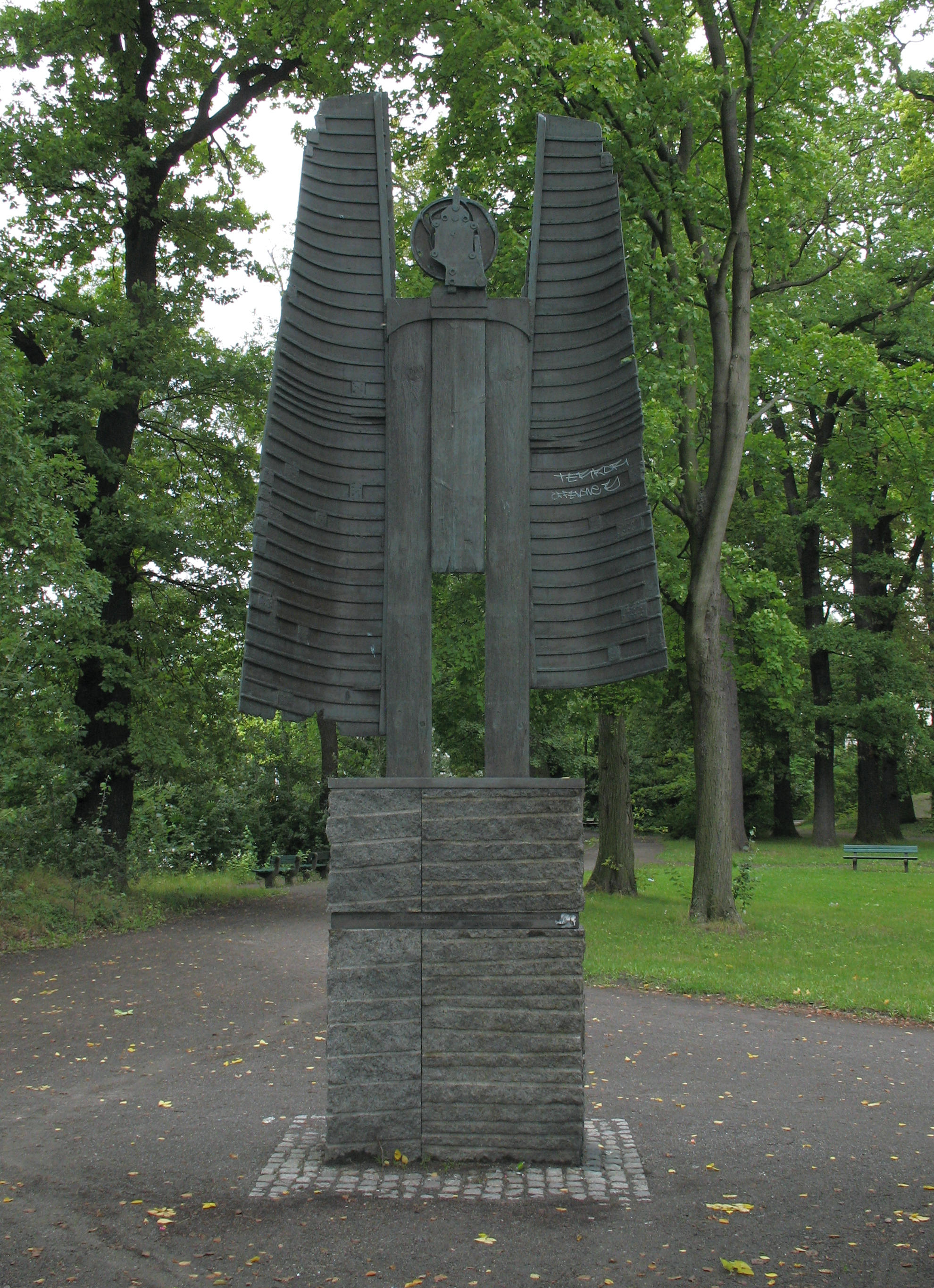
Siegfried Kühl, Der archaische Erz-Engel vom Heiligensee, 1989, sculpture in homage to Hannah Höch in Berlin-Reinickendorf

Höch was a pioneer of the art form that became known as photomontage and of the Dada movement. Many of her pieces sardonically critiqued the mass culture beauty industry of the time, then gaining significant momentum in mass media through the rise of fashion and advertising photography. Many of her political works from the Dada period equated women's liberation with social and political revolution.

Her work displays the chaos and combustion of Berlin's visual culture from the female perspective. In particular, her photomontages often critically addressed the Weimar New Woman, collating images from contemporary magazines. Her works from 1926 to 1935 often depicted same-sex couples, and women were once again a central theme in her work from 1963 to 1973. Her most often used technique was to fuse together male and female bodies. This fusion existed in order to give the attributed power of a man to a woman, as well as blur the lines of gender attributed actions. She also used historically feminine mediums such as embroidery and lace in her collages to highlight gendered associations.

Höch also made strong statements on racial discrimination. Her most famous piece is Schnitt mit dem Küchenmesser DADA durch die letzte Weimarer Bierbauchkulturepoche Deutschlands ("Cut with the Kitchen Knife Dada through the Last Weimar Beer-Belly Cultural Epoch in Germany"), a critique of Weimar Germany in 1919. This piece combines images from newspapers of the time mixed and re-created to make a new statement about life and art in the Dada movement.

From an Ethnographic Museum (1929), one of Höch's most ambitious and highly political projects, is a series of twenty photomontages that depict images of European female bodies with images of African male bodies and masks from museum catalogues, creating collages that offer "the visual culture of two vastly separate civilizations as interchangeable—the modish European flapper loses none of her stylishness in immediate proximity to African tribal objects; likewise, the non-Western artifact is able to signify in some fundamental sense as ritual object despite its conflation with patently European features." Hoch created Dada Puppen (Dada Dolls) 1916. These dolls were influenced by Hugo Ball, the Zurich-based founder of Dada. The doll's costumes resembled the geometric forms of Ball's own costumes worn in seminal Dada performances.

== Important works ==
=== Cut with the Kitchen Knife Dada through the Last Weimar Beer-Belly Cultural Epoch in Germany (1919) ===
Dada was an inherently political movement; Dadaists often deployed satire to address the issues of the time. They attempted to push art to the limits of humanity and to convey the chaos in post-war (World War I, which did not yet have this title) Germany. "Many of Höch's overtly political photomontages caricatured the pretended socialism of the new republic and linked female liberation with leftist political revolution" (Lavin). Perhaps Höch's most well known piece Schnitt mit dem Küchenmesser DADA durch die letzte Weimarer Bierbauchkulturepoche Deutschlands ("Cut with the Kitchen Knife Dada through the Beer-Belly of the Weimar Republic") symbolizes her cutting through the patriarchal society. The piece is a direct criticism of the failed attempt at democracy imposed by the Weimar Republic. Cut with the Kitchen Knife is "an explosive agglomeration of cut-up images, bang in the middle of the most well-known photograph of the seminal First International Dada Fair in 1920" (Hudson). This photomontage is an excellent example of a piece that combines these three central themes in Höch's works: androgyny, the "New Woman" and political discourse. It combines images of political leaders with sports stars, mechanized images of the city, and Dada artists.

=== The Beautiful Girl (1920) ===
"The New Woman of Weimar Germany was a sign of modernity and liberation" (Lavin).

Women in Weimar Germany in theory had a new freedom to discover social, political, and self-definition—all areas heavily addressed by Höch. Despite this, there were still many issues with the socioeconomic status of women. Women were given more freedom, yet in a way that seemed to be predetermined for them. They were still restricted to certain jobs and had the less employment benefits than their male counterparts. Analysis of Höch's piece Das Schöne Mädchen ("The Beautiful Girl") shows the construction of the archetype of the "New Woman". The piece combines motifs of the ideal feminine woman with car parts. In the upper right corner there is a woman's face with the eyes of a cat. Along with industrialization comes the opportunity for women to be more involved in the workforce. While this opportunity was exciting for women, it was also frightening—symbolized by the cat eyes staring down at the image. This image shows that although women were excited about the idea of the "New Woman" and the freedom this lifestyle might bring, it was a freedom that was still constructed by men, who still had most of the power in society.

=== Marlene (1930) ===
This piece alludes to an ambiguous sexual identity of the subject. The image depicts two men looking upward at a pair of legs clad in stockings with high heels atop a pedestal. This pedestal symbolizes traditionalism, while the legs show sexuality triumphing over classical architecture (which would have been revered by the Nazis). The lips in the upper right corner show a feminine sexuality that is kept from the male gaze. (Lavin). For the viewer, the piece can provide the concept of a utopian moment that opposes gender-hierarchies. "Her androgynous images depict a pleasure in the movement between gender positions and a deliberate deconstruction of rigid masculine and feminine identities" (Lavin). These ideas were radical at the time when Höch raised them, but are still in the process of being addressed today. Androgyny can be viewed as a utopian ideal in Höch's works; in addition it relates to some of the radical leftist ideas in her works and the political discourse surrounding them.

=== Ethnographic Museum Series (1924–1930) ===
Höch created an expansive series of works titled the Ethnographic Museum Series after a visit to an ethnographic museum. Germany had begun colonial expansion into African and Oceanic territories by the 1880s, which lead to an influx of cultural artifacts into Germany. Höch was inspired by the pedestals and masks present in the museums, and began incorporating them into her art.

=== Mother (1930) Ethnographic Museum series (1924–1930) ===
The photomontage Mutter ("Mother"), part of Höch's Ethnographic Museum series, utilizes the photo of a pregnant, working class mother. Höch effaces the woman with a mask from the Kwakwakaʼwakw, or the Kwakuti Indian tribe, on the Northwest Coast. She pastes a woman's mouth over the bottom of the mask, and a single eye over one of the eye holes. The image is part of an ongoing critique by Höch of Paragraph 218, a law outlawing abortion in Germany at the time.

=== Death Dance and Time of Suffering Series ===
Höch also executed two series around 1943, TotenTanz ("Death Dance") and Notzeit ("Time of Suffering"). Death Dance consists of three works, titled Death Dance I, Death Dance II, and Death Dance III. This series is primarily watercolor and pencil. The images show individual figures without hair or defining features, in long gray shifts, filing across barren pastel landscapes. The Time of Suffering series is black and white but contains similar figures to the Death Dance series. The series, comprising two works titled Time of Suffering I and Time of Suffering II, shows the figures walking through a cemetery towards a grim reaper, and a line of people leading up into the sky.

=== Strange Beauty II (1966) ===
Höch returned to the female figure in the 1960s after a long period where she favored surrealism and abstraction. Fremde Schönheit II ("Strange Beauty II") is a part of this return, showing a woman surrounded by feathery pink fauna. The woman's face is covered by a Peruvian terracotta trophy head. In this piece, Höch effaces the figure of the New Woman and replaces her head with a tribal mask, turning the figure from beautiful to disturbing.

== Exhibitions ==
Höch's work has been exhibited internationally in solo and group exhibitions.

The Whitechapel Gallery in London presented a major exhibition of Höch's work from 15 January to 23 March 2014. This exhibition was composed of over one hundred works from international collections that Höch created from the 1910s to 1970s. Highlights included Staatshäupter (Heads of State) (1918–20), Hochfinanz (High Finance) (1923), Flucht (Flight) (1931), and many works from the series From an Ethnographic Museum.

Examples of her work were included in Woven Histories: Textiles and Modern Abstraction.

=== Selected solo shows ===
- 2017: Hannah Höch – Auf der Suche nach der versteckten Schönheit, (Looking for the hidden beauty), Galerie und Verlag St. Gertrude, Hamburg, 20 April – 16 June 2017.
- 2016: Hannah Höch – Revolutionärin der Kunst, Kunsthalle Mannheim und Kunstmuseum Mülheim an der Ruhr.
- 2015: Vorhang auf für Hannah Höch (Curtain up for Hannah Höch), Kunsthaus Stade, Stade, Germany, 7 November 2015 – 21 February 2016.
- 2014: Hannah Höch, Whitechapel Gallery, London.
- 2008: Hannah Höch – Aller Anfang ist DADA (Every Beginning is DADA), Museum Tinguely, Basel.
- 2007: Hannah Höch – Aller Anfang ist DADA, (Every Beginning is DADA), Berlinische Galerie, Berlin.
- 1997: The Photomontages of Hannah Höch, Walker Art Center, Museum of Modern Art, and the Los Angeles County Museum of Art, Minneapolis, New York City, Los Angeles.
- 1993: Hannah Höch, Museums of the City of Gotha, Germany.
- 1974: Hannah Höch, National Museum of Modern Art, Kyoto.
- 1961: Hannah Höch: Bilder, Collagen, Aquarelle 1918–1961, Galerie Nierendorf, Berlin.
- 1929: Hannah Höch, Kunstzaal De Bron, The Hague.

== Bibliography ==
External media
- Cut with the Kitchen Knife Dada ..., Detail

Images
- Annotated Cut with the Kitchen Knife ..., Flickr

Video
- Höch's Cut with the Kitchen Knife Dada ..., Smarthistory

- Natias Neutert: Lady Dada. Essays über die Bild(er)finderin Hannah Höch. Lilienstaub & Schmidt, Berlin 2019, ISBN 978-3-945003-45-9.
- McBride, Patrizia. "Narrative Resemblance: The Production Of Truth In The Modernist Photobook Of Weimar Germany." New German Critique: An Interdisciplinary Journal of German Studies 115.(2012): 169–197.
- Chametzky, Peter. Objects as History in Twentieth-Century German Art: Beckmann to Beuys. Berkeley: University of California Press, 2010.
- Biro, M. The Dada Cyborg: Visions of the New Human in Weimar Berlin. Minneapolis: University of Minnesota Press, 2009. ISBN 978-0-8166-3620-4
- Bergius, H. Dada Triumphs! Dada Berlin, 1917–1923. Artistry of Polarities. Montages – Metamechanics – Manifestations. Translated by Brigitte Pichon. Vol. V. of the ten editions of Crisis and the Arts. The History of Dada, ed. by Stephen Foster, New Haven, Conn. u. a., Thomson/ Gale 2003. ISBN 978-0-8161-7355-6.
- Bergius, H. Montage und Metamechanik. Dada Berlin – Ästhetik von Polaritäten (mit Rekonstruktion der Ersten Internationalen Dada-Messe und Dada-Chronologie) Berlin: Gebr. Mann Verlag 2000. ISBN 978-3-7861-1525-0.
- Meskimmon, Marsha. We Weren't Modern Enough: Women Artists and the Limits of German Modernism. Berkeley, California: University of California Press, 1999.
- Gaze, Delia. Dictionary of Women Artists, Volume One. London: Taylor & Francis, 1997.
- Hemus, Ruth. Dada's Women. London & New Haven: Yale University Press, 2009.
- Kamenish, Paula K. (2015). Mamas of Dada: women of the European avant-garde. Columbia, South Carolina: University of South Carolina Press. ISBN 978-1-61117-468-7.
- Sante, Lucy. "Dada's Girl: Hannah Höch Thumbs Her Nose at Art." Slate. 10 April 1997.
- Lavin, Maud. "The Mess of History or the Unclean Hannah Höch". In: Catherine de Zegher (ed.), Inside the Visible. The Institute of Contemporary Art, Boston & MIT Press, 1996.
- Makela, Maria, and Peter Boswell, eds. The Photomontages of Hannah Hoch. Minneapolis: Walker Art Center, 1996.
- Meskimmon, Marsha & Shearer West, ed. Visions of the 'Neue Frau': Women and the Visual Arts in Weimar Germany. Hants, England: Scolar Press, 1995.
- Makela, Maria. "Hannah Höch". In: Louise R. Noun (ed.), Three Berlin Artists of the Weimar Era: Hannah Höch, Käthe Kollwitz, Jeanne Mammen. Des Moines, Iowa: Des Moines Art Center, 1994.
- Lavin, Maud. Cut With the Kitchen Knife: The Weimar Photomontages of Hannah Hoch. New Haven, Connecticut: Yale University Press, 1993.
- Bergius, Hanne Das Lachen Dadas. Die Berliner Dadaisten und ihre Aktionen. Gießen: Anabas-Verlag, 1989. ISBN 978-3-87038-141-7.
- Ohff, Heinz. Hannah Höch. Berlin: Deutsche Gesellschaft für Bildende Kunst, 1968.
- Sawelson-Gorse, Nadia. Women in Dada. Cambridge, Mass.: MIT Press, 2001.

== See also ==
- Kurt Schwitters
- Marcel Duchamp
- Raoul Hausmann
- List of German women artists
