= Donatas Morkūnas =

Lithuanian politician (born 1957)

Donatas Morkūnas (born 17 April 1957 in Druskininkai, Lithuania) is a politician, banker, a former lecturer at Šiauliai Pedagogical Institute, and signatory of the 1990 Act of the Re-Establishment of the State of Lithuania.
