= Richard Huelsenbeck =

German psychoanalyst (1892–1974)

Carl Wilhelm Richard Hülsenbeck
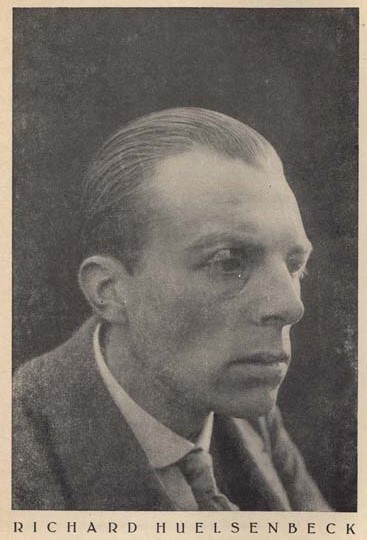
- Richard Hülsenbeck in 1920
- Born: 23 April 1892; Frankenau, Hessen-Nassau
- Died: 20 April 1974 (aged 81); Muralton, Switzerland

Carl Wilhelm Richard Hülsenbeck (aka Charles R. Hulbeck) (23 April 1892 – 20 April 1974) was a German writer, poet, and psychoanalyst born in Frankenau, Hessen-Nassau who was associated with the formation of the Dada movement.

== Life and work ==
After attending the Gymnasium am Ostring in Bochum, Huelsenbeck became a medical student on the eve of World War I. He was invalided out of the army and emigrated to Zürich, Switzerland in February 1916, where he fell in with the Cabaret Voltaire. In January 1917, he moved to Berlin, taking with him the ideas and techniques which helped him found the Berlin Dada group. 'To make literature with a gun in my hand had for a time been my dream,' he wrote in 1920.

Huelsenbeck was the editor of the Dada Almanach, and wrote Dada siegt, En Avant Dada and other Dadaist works. Huelsenbeck's autobiography Memoirs of a Dada Drummer gives detailed accounts of his interactions with many key figures of the movement.

Huelsenbeck's ideas fitted in with left-wing politics current at the time in Berlin. However idealistic Huelsenbeck and his companions were, their challenge Dada is German Bolshevism had unfortunate repercussions later, when the National Socialists denounced all aspects of modern art as Kunstbolschewismus. Beginning in 1933, Huelsenbeck was repeatedly investigated by the Nazi authorities. He was forbidden to write and rather than remaining in 'exile', he managed to get an immigration visa to the United States in 1936. He changed his name to Charles R. Hulbeck and practiced medicine and psychoanalysis at the Karen Horney Clinic in Long Island, New York. In 1970 he returned to the Ticino region of Switzerland.

Of his music, Hugo Ball wrote, "Huelsenbeck has arrived. He pleads for an intensification of rhythm (Negro rhythm). He would best love to drum literature & to perdition."

Until the end of his life, Huelsenbeck insisted, "Dada is still existing," although the movement's other founders might not have agreed.
