= Kroesos Foundation =

Luxemburgese artist

The Kroesos Foundation is an artistic collective set up by Luxemburgese Artist Mark Divo. Between January and March 2002 they occupied the building in the centre of Zurich where the original European Dada movement began, as a response to the horrors of World War I, which came to be known as the Cabaret Voltaire. The collective organised a number of events/ performances over a period of three months until they were forced to leave the building. In spite of their eviction they managed to have the building turned into a museum. Members of the collective, apart from Divo, include Aiana Calugar, Dan Jones, Lennie Lee, ingo giezendanner and Pastor Leumund Cult. Throughout the winter of 2002 they were described as neo-Dadaists by the Swiss and international press. The group have exhibited in a number of international exhibitions including the real Biennale at the Kinský Palace in Prague.
