= Flametti, or The Dandyism of the Poor =

1918 novel by Hugo Ball

- Author: Hugo Ball
- Original title: Flametti; oder, Vom Dandysmus der Armen
- Translator: Catherine Schelbert
- Language: German
- Publisher: Erich Reiß
- Publication date: 1918
- Publication place: Germany
- English publication date: 2014
- Pages: 224

Flametti, or The Dandyism of the Poor (German: Flametti; oder, Vom Dandysmus der Armen) is a 1918 novel by the German writer Hugo Ball. It is a portrayal of vaudeville life in Zurich and follows Max Flametti, director of a variety-entertainment company on the verge of financial ruin.

The semi-autobiographical novel was inspired by Ball's experience from Zurich variety troupes in the 1910s. It was Ball's first novel. He wrote it in 1916, the same year he co-founded the Cabaret Voltaire and wrote the Dada Manifesto, and it was published two years later by Erich Reiß in Berlin.

The English translation by Catherine Schelbert received the 2015 Helen and Kurt Wolff Translator's Prize.
