= Gideon London =

British artist

Gideon "Gid" London (1961–2010) was a British artist.

== Early years ==
London was born on 18 March 1961 in Hampstead, London. He studied fine art at Stourbridge College.

== Career ==
He was a successful film maker and collage artist, in addition to being an ex-member of the ARC group, a London-based collective of international artists, influenced by Kurt Schwitters, who specialised in building site-specific installation art.

From 1987 to 1991, he worked together with the ARC group until it was finally disbanded in November 1991 in Budapest. In 1990, he was included in a show together with the other members of the group at the Galleria Milano in Italy. In 1995, he took part in a joint project with the artists' collective FA+, founded by the Swedish artists Gustavo Aguerre and Ingrid Falk.

In the late 1990s, he made a series of Channel Four television documentaries including The Wonderful World of Lennie Lee. From 1990, he exhibited widely both in the UK and abroad. His collages are said to echo the work of earlier masters such as Schwitters and the Dadaist movement. His work was used for the cover of Zero 7's CD The Garden which was named after his collage. He died on 10 April 2010.
