= Karawane =

Orchestral composition

Karawane is a composition for chorus and orchestra by the Finnish composer Esa-Pekka Salonen. The work was jointly commissioned by the Tonhalle Orchester Zürich, the Swedish Radio Symphony Orchestra, the New York Philharmonic with support from the philanthropist Marie-Josée Kravis, the Bamberg Symphony, and the Finnish Radio Symphony Orchestra. It was first performed by the Tonhalle Orchester Zürich and the Zürcher Sing-Akademie conducted by Lionel Bringuier in the Tonhalle, Zürich, on September 10, 2014. The piece is set to the eponymous poem by the German author and Dadaist Hugo Ball.

== Composition ==
Karawane has a duration of approximately 28 minutes and is composed in two numbered parts. Each part is subdivided into six connected and unnamed movements.

=== Background ===
Karawane was composed between January 2013 and July 2014. Salonen had long intended to write a piece for chorus and orchestra, but delayed its composition due to scheduling conflicts and a lack of appropriate text. The opportunity finally arose when Salonen received a commission from a consortium of international orchestras. Knowing the premiere would be held in Zürich, the composer decided to connect his piece to the city's history, particularly the origins of Dadaism in 1916. Salonen wrote in the score program notes, "Soon I settled for perhaps the best known Dada poem (or 'Lautpoesie', 'Sound Poetry' as it was called) by Hugo Ball, the founder of Dada, author of the Dada Manifesto, and the central figure in all the activities of Cabaret Voltaire, the first forum of the early dadaists."

=== Instrumentation ===
The work is scored for an SATB chorus and a large orchestra consisting of three flutes (2nd doubling alto flute; 3rd doubling piccolo), two oboes, English horn, two clarinets, bass clarinet (doubling 3rd clarinet), contrabass clarinet, two bassoons, contrabassoon, four horns, three trumpets (3rd doubling piccolo trumpet), three trombones, tuba, timpani, four percussionists, harp, piano (doubling celesta), and strings.

== Reception ==
Karawane has been praised by music critics. Reviewing the world premiere, Mark Swed of the Los Angeles Times called it "a mischievous, madcap 30-minute work for orchestra" and wrote, "Karawane channels Salonen's inner caveman (who knew?), treating the text of made-up words (the opening is: 'jolifant bambla o falli bambla') as a springboard for a circus of styles and emotions. Written in a double cycle, the second part intensifying the first, the score propels from one entrancing dreamlike state to another, from one extreme (nocturnal quiescence) to another (a wild Javanese monkey chant)." After hearing a later performance by Los Angeles Philharmonic, Swed called it "richer, lusher, livelier and all the more unhesitatingly in-your-face."

Reviewing a performance of the work by the New York Philharmonic, Zachary Woolfe of The New York Times described it as "the product of a mature master, working with more confidence and patience on a larger canvas. The chorus’s hypnotic incantations have the undergirding of a glistening orchestral landscape, sometimes swaying, sometimes blooming." He continued:

At one point, a passionate cello solo becomes a duet with an oboe, which then gets a layer of enigmatic percussion before the other strings come in, as gently lyrical as any Mahler slow movement. Later, ethereal notes in the chorus are punctuated by firm string downbeats, like exhalations, that build to loud grandeur, then immediately recede, before a swirling, swinging climax driven on by an undercurrent of ba-bum heartbeat rhythm.

Jay Nordlinger of The New Criterion was slightly more critical of the piece, however, remarking, "I found Karawane a bit tiresome. But perhaps the problem was my lack of patience, rather than a lack of imagination on the composer's part. In a program note of his own, Gilbert called Salonen's work 'deliciously whimsical while also being fully formed and rigorous.' I'll buy that. And I'll definitely buy Salonen, who is a credit to this musical age." Despite calling it "entertaining and grandiose," George Grella of the New York Classical Review similarly observed that the "narrative feel of Karawane loses out to density over a 30-minute duration." He added, "There are entertaining, colorful bits of music that seem inspired by other composers, like Ennio Morricone, Philip Glass, and John Adams. In particular, sections seem like responses to Harmonium. Salonen embraces clichés with a knowing wink, but they add bigness to a piece that is already overblown."
