= John Elderfield =

American art historian (born 1943)

John Elderfield (born 25 April 1943) is a retired art historian and museum curator, who was Chief Curator of Painting and Sculpture at the Museum of Modern Art, New York, from 2003 to 2008. He then served as the Allen R. Adler, Class of 1967, Distinguished Curator at the Princeton University Art Museum and Lecturer in the Princeton University Department of Art and Archaeology from 2012 to 2019.

== Early life ==
Elderfield was born in the North Yorkshire village of Lazenby, just outside the town of Redcar; a twin brother to Harry Elderfield.

== Career ==
Elderfield studied the history of art at the University of Manchester and the University of Leeds. He received his PhD from the Courtauld Institute of Art in 1975.

In 1974, Elderfield edited and introduced the diary of the Zurich Dada poet Hugo Ball, Flight out of Time. This publication was revised in 1996.

Elderfield joined the Museum of Modern Art, New York, as Curator of Painting and Sculpture in 1975. He served as the Museum's Chief Curator at Large from 1993 to 2003. As Chief Curator of Painting and Sculpture at the Museum, he reinstalled that collection in 2004 in its newly rebuilt premises.

Elderfield has published studies of Henri Matisse, Kurt Schwitters, Helen Frankenthaler, Richard Diebenkorn, Howard Hodgkin, and Pierre-Paul Prud'hon. In 1986, Elderfield received the Eric Mitchell Prize for his book on Kurt Schwitters.

Elderfield contributed a catalog essay to the exhibition of Bob Dylan's paintings at the National Gallery of Denmark from September 2010 until April 2011

He has served on the board of the Dedalus Foundation, the Members’ Board of the Phillips Collection, Washington, D.C, the American Advisory Committee of the Courtauld Institute of Art, the American Committee of the Praemium Imperiale, and the Advisory Committee of the Kate Weare Dance Company; was a Member of the Association of Literary Scholars, Critics, and Writers, and an Honorary Member of Proyecto Armando Reverón, Caracas.

At Princeton University Elderfield has curated two Willem de Kooning exhibitions the first in 2017-17 Drawn and Paint (zeroing in on his later career), and the second, De Kooning: The Brealthrough Years 1945-5 (dealing with his earlier works from his when he made it period) in March of 2026.

== Recognition ==
Elderfield received the award of Chevalier des Arts et des Lettres from the French Government. In 2005, Time Magazine included Elderfield on their list of the 100 most influential people of 2005.

== Bibliography ==
- Flight Out of Time: A Dada Diary, by Hugo Ball, edited with an introduction and notes by John Elderfield (University of California Press, 1974; revised 1996). ISBN 978-0-520-20440-9
- Kurt Schwitters (New edition 1987), Thames & Hudson. ISBN 978-0-500-27474-3
- Modern Painting And Sculpture: 1880 to Present at the Museum of Modern Art, New York: Museum of Modern Art, 2004. ISBN 0-87070-576-8
- Henri Matisse: A Retrospective, New York: Museum of Modern Art, 1992. ISBN 0-87070-432-X
- Helen Frankenthaler, Harry N. Abrams, 1987. ISBN 0-8109-0916-2
- Language of the Body: Drawings by Pierre-Paul Prud'hon, Harry N. Abrams, 1996. ISBN 0-8109-3585-6
- Manet and the Execution of Emperor Maximilian, New York: Museum of Modern Art, 2006. ISBN 0870704230
- Cézanne Portraits, Princeton University Press, 2017. ISBN 978-0691177861
