= Ottonella Mocellin =

Italian photographer and video artist

Ottonella Mocellin (born 1966 in Milan) is an Italian photographer and video artist based in Milan.

Mocellin works with text, sound installation, performance and site specific projects. Her work is based on issues of identity and human relationships. In 1984 she moved to London, where she attended the Chelsea School of Art. She was a founding member of the ARC Group along with Shahin Afrassiabi, Emma Holmes, Gideon London, Lennie Lee, David Miles, Nicola Pellegrini, João Quintino, Nicola Reece, Andrew Stockwell and Emanuelle Waeckerle. In 1993 she moved back to Milan with Pellegrini. Her work has been exhibited at the Malmo Museum, the Venice Biennale, the Gallery of Modern Art in Turin, the National Slovak Gallery, Bratislava, the Contemporary Art Center in Vilnius, the Gallery of Modern Art in Bologna, the P.S.1 Contemporary Art Center in New York, the 2nd Tirana Biennale (2003). She represented Italy for the PS1 International Studio Program In New York in 2001/2002.
