= Cabaret Voltaire =

Cabaret Voltaire may refer to:

- Cabaret Voltaire (Zürich), a Swiss cabaret founded in 1916, distinguished by the involvement of Dada artists
- Cabaret Voltaire (band), a British industrial/techno musical group
- Cabaret Voltaire (magazine), a Dada magazine published in 1916 in Zurich
- Cabaret Voltaire, a 1916 painting by Marcel Janco
- Cabaret Voltaire, a Houston, Texas punk club
