= Ingrid Falk (artist) =

Swedish painter, installation artist and curator

Ingrid Falk (born 1960 in Sweden) is a painter, installation artist and curator. In 1992 formed the art collective FA+ in collaboration with her husband, Gustavo Aguerre. Amongst the artists who have worked with FA+ are Nicola Pellegrini, Otonella Mocellin, Daniel Wetter and Lennie Lee. Together Ingrid Falk and Gustavo Aguerre have worked on a number of site-specific installations throughout Europe. These involve large-scale installations, photographic projections, sculptures and video installations. Falk has exhibited in a number of important museums and private galleries throughout Europe. Ingrid Falk and Gustavo Aguerre assembled 3,053 pieces of toast into a large mosaic of a toaster in late 1999—they are attributed with spreading toast as an art medium.

== Exhibitions ==
- Italian Pavilion at the Venice Biennale in 1999
- Malmö Art Museum in 1996
- ARCO in 2000
- The Museo Nacional de Bellas Artes in Buenos Aires, 2000. Two site installations: The Toaster and Pax Securitas
- Konstnärshuset, Stockholm
- Stenersen Museum, Oslo
- Tirana Biennale, 2001
- Reykjavik Art Museum in 2002
- National Center of Contemporary Art in 2005
