= Spandau 5 =

State electoral district of Germany

- Electoral district for the Berlin House of Representatives
- Spandau 5 in 2026
- District: Spandau
- Electorate: 31,802 (2026)

Current electoral district
- Party: CDU
- Member: Kai Wegner

Spandau 5 is an electoral constituency (German: Wahlkreis) represented in the House of Representatives of Berlin. It elects one member via first-past-the-post voting.

== Geography ==
The constituency comprises the districts of Pichelsdorf, Gatow, Kladow, and southern Wilhelmstadt, within the borough of Spandau.

There were 31,802 eligible voters in 2026.

== Members ==
Election	Member	Party	%
1999	Peter Trapp	CDU	59.0
2001	Peter Trapp	CDU	42.2
2006	Peter Trapp	CDU	42.3
2011	Peter Trapp	CDU	44.2
2016	Peter Trapp	CDU	31.8
2021	Kai Wegner	CDU	36.5
2023	Kai Wegner	CDU	46.9
2026	Kai Wegner	CDU	31.8

== Election results ==
=== 2026 election ===
State election (2026): Spandau 5
Notes:	Blue background denotes the winner of the electorate vote. Pink background denotes a candidate elected from their party list. Yellow background denotes an electorate win by a list member, or other incumbent. A ✓ or ✗ denotes status of any incumbent, win or lose respectively.						
Party	Candidate	Votes	%	±%	Party votes	%	±%
CDU	✓ Kai Wegner	7,575	31.8	▼15.0	7,815	32.7	▼11.2
SPD	Susanne Drescher	4,611	19.4	▼2.6	3,675	15.4	▼5.0
AfD	Frithjof Porsch	4,088	17.2	▲9.1	4,190	17.5	▲9.0
Greens	Dara Kossok-Spieß	2,548	10.7	Steady	2,714	11.4	▲0.2
Left	Fritz Stephan	2,241	9.4	▲6.7	2,631	11.0	▲7.7
FDP	Paul Fresdorf	981	4.1	▼0.5	920	3.8	▼2.1
BSW	Peyman Rezvani	608	2.6		778	3.3	
Tierschutzpartei	Vivien Maricano	604	2.5	▼0.6	520	2.2	▼0.5
Volt	Danina Margit Schwarm	360	1.5		379	1.6	▲1.2
PARTEI	Jacob Spötter	168	0.7	▼0.5	139	0.6	▼0.3
PdF					77	0.3	
ÖDP					42	0.2	Steady
du.					16	0.1	Steady
DKP					7	0.0	Steady
SGP					5	0.0	Steady
Informal votes		464			340		
Total valid votes		23,784			23,908		
Turnout		24,248	76.2	▲8.7			
CDU hold	Majority	2,964	12.4	▼12.5			

=== 2023 repeat election ===
Changes denoted below for the 2023 election are compared to the 2016 election, as the 2021 election was declared invalid.

State election (2023): Spandau 5
Notes:	Blue background denotes the winner of the electorate vote. Pink background denotes a candidate elected from their party list. Yellow background denotes an electorate win by a list member, or other incumbent. A ✓ or ✗ denotes status of any incumbent, win or lose respectively.						
Party	Candidate	Votes	%	±%	Party votes	%	±%
CDU	✓ Kai Wegner	9,873	46.9	▲15.1	9,232	43.9	▲15.9
SPD	Uwe Ziesak	4,626	22.0	▼5.7	4,299	20.4	▼3.4
Greens	Elmas Wieczorek-Hahn	2,253	10.7	▲1.2	2,355	11.2	▲1.0
AfD	Andreas Otti	1,706	8.1	▼7.0	1,799	8.5	▼6.4
FDP	Paul Fresdorf	978	4.6	▼4.8	1,254	6.0	▼5.4
Tierschutzpartei	Roman Lennert Weber	668	3.2		563	2.7	▲0.9
Left	Marc Mattern	564	2.7	▼2.3	692	3.3	▼2.3
PARTEI	Benjamin Marzahn	248	1.2		180	0.9	Steady
dieBasis	Klaus-Peter Berens	126	0.6		84	0.4	
Gray Panthers					81	0.4	▼0.5
Team Todenhöfer					62	0.3	
The Grays					59	0.3	
Pirates					49	0.2	▼0.7
ÖDP					39	0.2	
Humanists					38	0.2	
Verjüngungsforschung					32	0.2	▼0.3
Mieterpartei					31	0.1	
FW					28	0.1	
Bildet Berlin!					19	0.1	
Klimaliste					19	0.1	
du.					13	0.1	
NPD					11	0.1	▼0.3
DKP					9	0.0	
BüSo					7	0.0	Steady
LKR	Richard Hildebrandt	16	0.1		4	0.0	▼0.4
The Pinks/Alliance 21					4	0.0	
Bergpartei, die ÜberPartei					1	0.0	
SGP					0	0.0	Steady
Informal votes		170			156		
Total valid votes		21,058			21,053		
Turnout		21,246	67.5	▼4.6			
CDU hold	Majority	5,247	24.9				

=== 2021 election (annulled) ===
The election in 2021 was annulled and rerun in 2023.

State election (2021): Spandau 5
Notes:	Blue background denotes the winner of the electorate vote. Pink background denotes a candidate elected from their party list. Yellow background denotes an electorate win by a list member, or other incumbent. A ✓ or ✗ denotes status of any incumbent, win or lose respectively.						
Party	Candidate	Votes	%	±%	Party votes	%	±%
CDU	Kai Wegner	8,970	36.5	▲4.7	8,155	33.0	▲5.1
SPD	Uwe Ziesak	6,153	25.0	▼2.6	5,740	23.3	▼0.6
Greens	Elmas Wieczorek-Hahn	3,146	12.8	▲3.3	3,217	13.0	▲2.9
AfD	Andreas Otti	1,976	8.0	▼7.0	1,996	8.1	▼6.8
FDP	Paul Fresdorf	1,886	7.7	▼1.8	2,256	9.1	▼2.2
Left	Marc Mattern	907	3.7	▼1.3	1,035	4.2	▼1.4
Tierschutzpartei	Roman Lennert Weber	791	3.2		507	2.1	▲0.2
dieBasis	Klaus-Peter Berens	364	1.5		273	1.1	
PARTEI	Benjamin Marzahn	357	1.5		295	1.2	▲0.3
FW					175	0.7	
Team Todenhöfer					172	0.7	
The Grays					123	0.5	
Volt					123	0.5	
Gray Panthers					118	0.5	▼0.4
APT					112	0.5	
Pirates					65	0.3	▼0.7
Verjüngungsforschung					48	0.2	▼0.2
ÖDP					45	0.2	
Mieterpartei					41	0.2	
Klimaliste					37	0.1	
Humanists					33	0.1	
du.					26	0.1	
Bildet Berlin!					19	0.1	
LKR	Richard Hildebrandt	29	0.1		15	0.1	▼0.4
NPD					15	0.1	▼0.3
DKP					14	0.1	Steady
The Pinks/Alliance 21					10	0.0	
Bergpartei, die ÜberPartei					6	0.0	
BüSo					5	0.0	Steady
SGP					3	0.0	Steady
Informal votes		352			247		
Total valid votes		24,579			24,679		
Turnout		24,968	78.4	▲6.2			
CDU hold	Majority	2,817	8.5				

== See also ==
- Politics of Berlin
- House of Representatives of Berlin
