= Neukölln 5 =

State electoral district of Germany

- Electoral district for the Berlin House of Representatives
- Neukölln 5 in 2026
- District: Neukölln
- Electorate: 33,372 (2026)

Current electoral district
- Party: CDU
- Member: Robbin Juhnke

Neukölln 5 is an electoral constituency (German: Wahlkreis) represented in the House of Representatives of Berlin. It elects one member via first-past-the-post voting.

== Geography ==
The constituency comprises the district of Britz southwest of the line Tempelhofer Weg/Buschkrugallee, and the district of Buckow west of Kölner Damm. It is entirely within the borough of Neukölln.

There were 33,372 eligible voters in 2026.

== Members ==
Election	Member	Party	%
1999	Eberhard Diepgen	CDU	64.9
2001	Reinhard Führer	CDU	43.7
2006	Marion Kroll	CDU	40.8
2011	Falko Liecke	CDU	38.3
2016	Robbin Juhnke	CDU	30.0
2021	Nina Lerch	SPD	30.3
2023	Robbin Juhnke	CDU	43.1
2026	Robbin Juhnke	CDU	28.2

== Election results ==
=== 2026 election ===
State election (2026): Neukölln 5
Notes:	Blue background denotes the winner of the electorate vote. Pink background denotes a candidate elected from their party list. Yellow background denotes an electorate win by a list member, or other incumbent. A ✓ or ✗ denotes status of any incumbent, win or lose respectively.						
Party	Candidate	Votes	%	±%	Party votes	%	±%
CDU	✓ Robbin Juhnke	6,473	28.2	▼14.9	5,832	25.0	▼15.3
AfD	Julian Potthast	4,698	20.5	▲10.5	4,589	19.7	▲9.8
Left	Emmi Stiegler	4,241	18.5	▲13.7	3,946	16.9	▲12.5
SPD	Joachim Rahmann	4,226	18.4	▼6.5	3,811	16.3	▼8.9
Greens	Jan Stiermann	1,945	8.5	▲0.5	1,947	8.3	▼0.1
BSW					1,312	5.6	
FDP					721	3.1	▼1.3
Tierschutzpartei	Gabriella Perotto	864	3.8	▲0.5	604	2.6	▲0.1
Volt	Susanne Heim	423	1.8		277	1.2	▲0.9
PARTEI					145	0.6	▼0.2
Independent	Hans-Dieter Worbs	99	0.4	▲0.3			
PdF					69	0.3	
ÖDP					33	0.1	Steady
du.					20	0.1	▼0.1
DKP					13	0.1	Steady
SGP					4	0.0	Steady
Informal votes		681			327		
Total valid votes		22,969			23,323		
Turnout		23,650	70.9	▲8.6			
CDU hold	Majority	2,247	9.8	▼8.4			

=== 2023 repeat election ===
Changes denoted below for the 2023 election are compared to the 2016 election, as the 2021 election was declared invalid.

State election (2023): Neukölln 5
Notes:	Blue background denotes the winner of the electorate vote. Pink background denotes a candidate elected from their party list. Yellow background denotes an electorate win by a list member, or other incumbent. A ✓ or ✗ denotes status of any incumbent, win or lose respectively.						
Party	Candidate	Votes	%	±%	Party votes	%	±%
CDU	✓ Robbin Juhnke	8,682	43.1	▲16.9	8,136	40.3	▲16.7
SPD	Nina Lerch	5,014	24.9	▼4.6	5,101	25.3	▲0.5
AfD	Jörg Kapitän	2,006	9.9	▼7.2	1,989	9.9	▼7.0
Greens	Christina Hilmer-Benedict	1,610	8.0	▼2.9	1,706	8.5	▼2.8
Left	Ferat Koçak	955	4.7	▼3.1	889	4.4	▼3.6
FDP	Angela Dehio	729	3.6	▼3.5	895	4.4	▼3.0
Tierschutzpartei	Martin Jürgen Ullrich	660	3.3		496	2.5	▲0.1
PARTEI	Florian Müller	309	1.5	▲1.2	170	0.8	▼0.6
Team Todenhöfer					139	0.7	
The Grays					96	0.5	
Gray Panthers					80	0.4	▼0.8
dieBasis	Philipp Sokoll	97	0.5		71	0.4	
Volt					66	0.3	
Pirates					61	0.3	▼0.9
FW	Bernward Eberenz	83	0.4		46	0.2	
Verjüngungsforschung					40	0.2	▼0.3
Mieterpartei					37	0.2	
du.					29	0.1	
Independent	Hans-Dieter Worbs	21	0.1				
Bildet Berlin!					20	0.1	
ÖDP					20	0.1	
NPD					18	0.1	▼0.6
DKP					16	0.1	Steady
Klimaliste					16	0.1	
Humanists					16	0.1	
The Pinks/Alliance 21					8	0.0	
LKR					7	0.0	▼0.4
BüSo					4	0.0	Steady
SGP					4	0.0	
Bergpartei, die ÜberPartei					1	0.0	
Informal votes		184			171		
Total valid votes		20,166			20,177		
Turnout		20,362	62.3	▼3.7			
CDU hold	Majority	3,668	18.2				

=== 2021 election (annulled) ===
The election in 2021 was annulled and rerun in 2023.

State election (2021): Neukölln 5
Notes:	Blue background denotes the winner of the electorate vote. Pink background denotes a candidate elected from their party list. Yellow background denotes an electorate win by a list member, or other incumbent. A ✓ or ✗ denotes status of any incumbent, win or lose respectively.						
Party	Candidate	Votes	%	±%	Party votes	%	±%
SPD	Nina Lerch	7,333	30.3	▲0.8	8,052	33.1	▲8.3
CDU	✗ Robbin Juhnke	6,941	28.7	▲2.6	6,026	24.8	▲1.1
Greens	Christina Hilmer-Benedict	2,469	10.2	▼0.7	2,277	9.4	▼1.9
AfD	Jörg Kapitän	2,295	9.5	▼7.6	2,243	9.2	▼7.7
FDP	Angela Dehio	1,791	7.4	▲0.2	1,779	7.3	▼0.1
Left	Ferat Koçak	1,363	5.6	▼2.2	1,211	5.0	▼3.0
Tierschutzpartei	Martin Jürgen Ullrich	964	4.0		588	2.4	▲0.1
Team Todenhöfer					487	2.0	
PARTEI	Florian Müller	389	1.6	▲1.3	276	1.1	▼0.3
FW	Bernward Eberenz	306	1.3		216	0.9	
dieBasis	Philipp Sokoll	297	1.2		219	0.9	
The Grays					157	0.6	
Gray Panthers					138	0.6	▼0.6
Volt					129	0.5	
APT					111	0.5	
Pirates					95	0.4	▼0.8
Verjüngungsforschung					56	0.2	▼0.2
Independent	Hans-Dieter Worbs	49	0.2				
Klimaliste					46	0.2	
Mieterpartei					36	0.1	
Humanists					36	0.1	
ÖDP					35	0.1	
Bildet Berlin!					21	0.1	
LKR					19	0.1	▼0.4
du.					16	0.1	
Bergpartei, die ÜberPartei					15	0.1	
DKP					12	0.0	Steady
The Pinks/Alliance 21					11	0.0	
BüSo					6	0.0	Steady
SGP					4	0.0	Steady
Informal votes		425			288		
Total valid votes		24,197			24,342		
Turnout		24,675	74.2	▲8.3			
SPD gain from CDU	Majority	392	1.6				

== See also ==
- Politics of Berlin
- House of Representatives of Berlin
