= Ana Roldán =

Mexican-Swiss artist

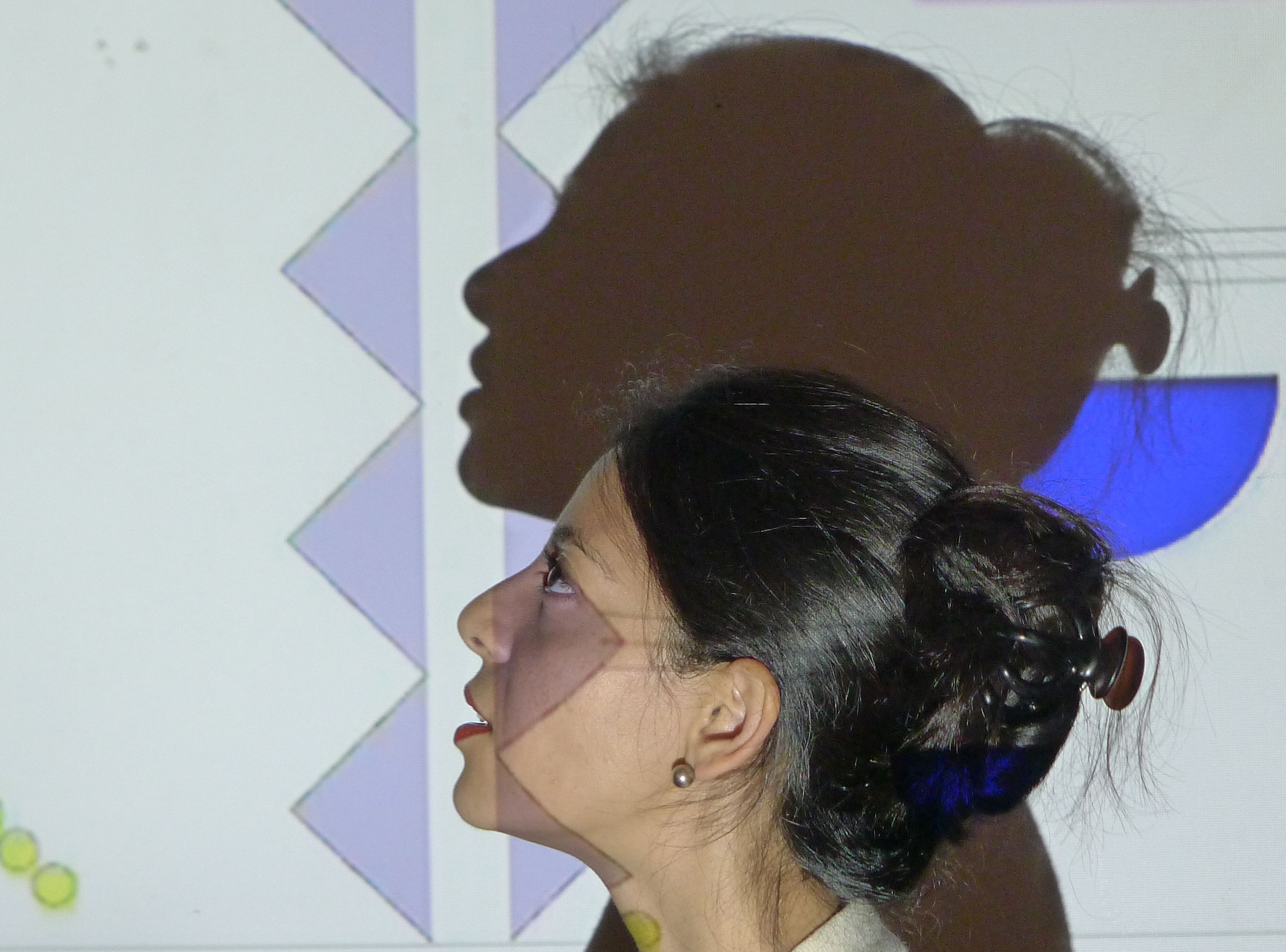
Ana Roldán 2012 in madrid in front of a projection in her exhibition Espejo Negro.

Ana Roldán (* 1977 in Mexico City) is a Mexican-Swiss artist.

== Personal life ==
Ana Roldán grew up in Mexico City. In her father's locksmith and carpentry shop, a small manufacturing business, she discovered her love of craftsmanship and began designing furniture. After training as a caterer, she ran a restaurant, then studied history at the Escuela Nacional de Antropología e Historia. She was so inspired by the work of Mexican performance artist Elvira Santamaría, that she began performing as a performance artist in Mexico City in the late 1990s. In 2000, she moved to Switzerland and studied art at the Bern University of the Arts and linguistics at the University of Bern. Afterward, she devoted herself entirely to art. In 2007, she won the City of Zurich's studio scholarship for China and worked in Kunming for a year.

After long stays in São Paulo and Mexico City, Ana Roldán now lives in Zurich.

== Career ==
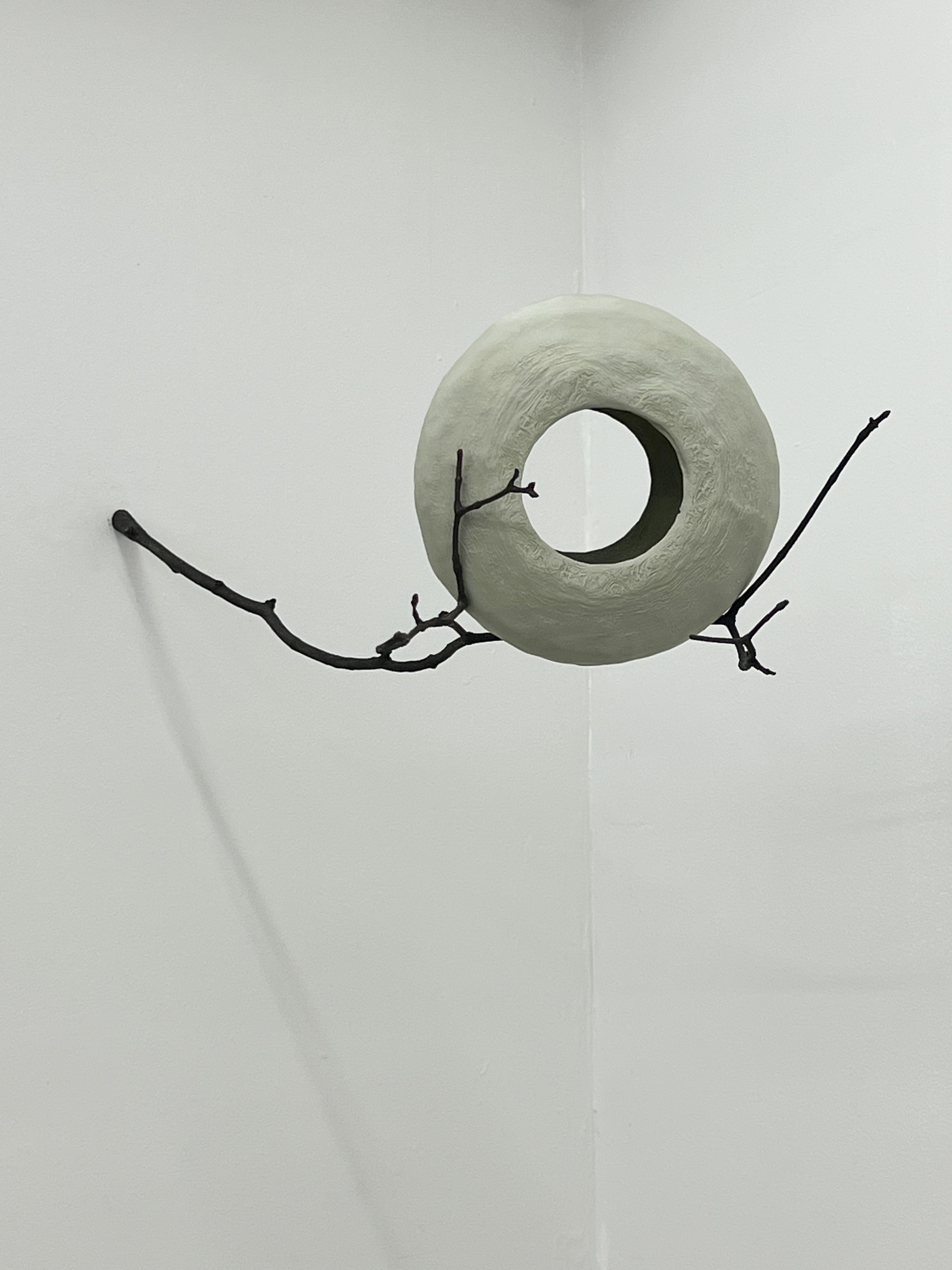
2023 Green hole

Ana Roldán's media are performances, sculptures, videos, collages, installations, photography and group exhibitions that she curates. Represented by galleries in Switzerland, Madrid, Mexico and in Colombia and the USA, it is just as present in Latin America as in Europe. Following Tropicalismo Hélio Oiticicas, Roldán often uses natural materials from Latin America such as coconuts, palm trees, banana flowers or jade. Many works oscillate between the austerity of European modernism and the softer forms of Latin American modernism, as seen in the work of the Mexican architect Luis Barragán findet, to whom Roldán refers on various occasions. Thus, the rectangles of modernity become crooked and crooked which Ana Roldán's work for Rio de Janeiro Colección de Especímenes de un Nuevo Mundo I reconstructs with the poor natural material bamboo. And instead of primary colors, she uses the palette of Brazil's skin tones.

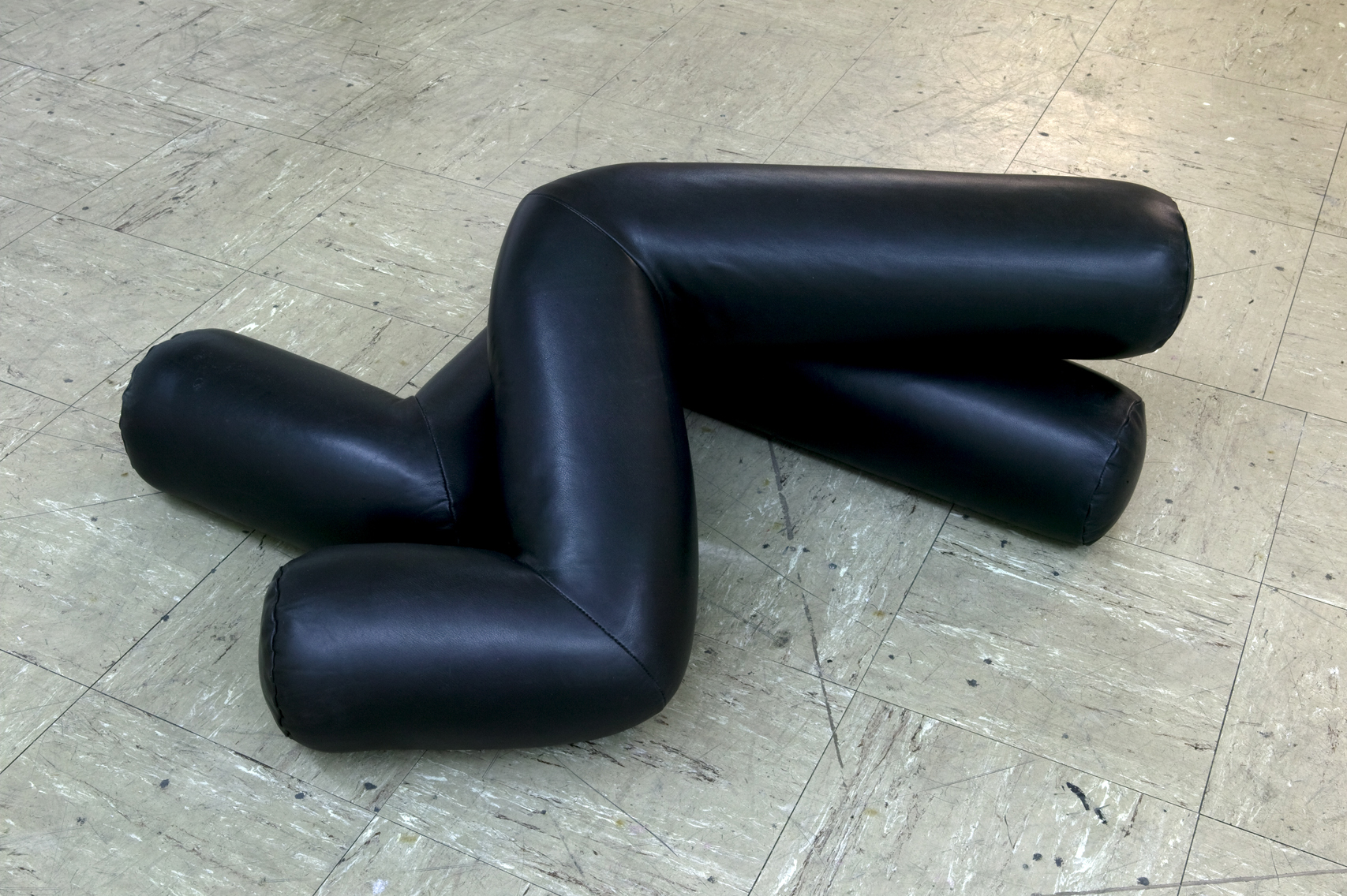
Ana Roldán, Joe, 2008, Leather, Wood, 29 × 100 × 45 cm

Roldán's repertoire includes concrete objects that become abstract, often minimalist art. She folds state flags to create more complex abstract color images.

Another recurring motif is anthropomorphic sculptures, which she first shows in 2004 with the work Joe, about which Pablo Müller writes: Two angled rolls of leather lying on top of each other are reminiscent of human limbs in their form and materiality. In this way, a performative quality of sculpture is hinted at in the works. Hans Rudolf Reust says about a continuation of Joe, namely the work I thought it was impossible (2015): The separation between geometries and bodies, figuration and abstraction is completely dissolved in the emerging figurations of black round fabric snakes with partially skin-colored overlays. Like slightly schematized human bodies, they are familiar to us, until a small change of perspective abruptly tips them over into abstract lineatures. A political reading is proposed by Thomas Haemmerli, who recalls the dismembered bodies present in the media of Mexico in the context of the civil war: The title I thought it was impossible then referred to cruelties that people do to each other - a diagnosis that applies today not only in Mexico, but globally in a world that has gone off the rails.

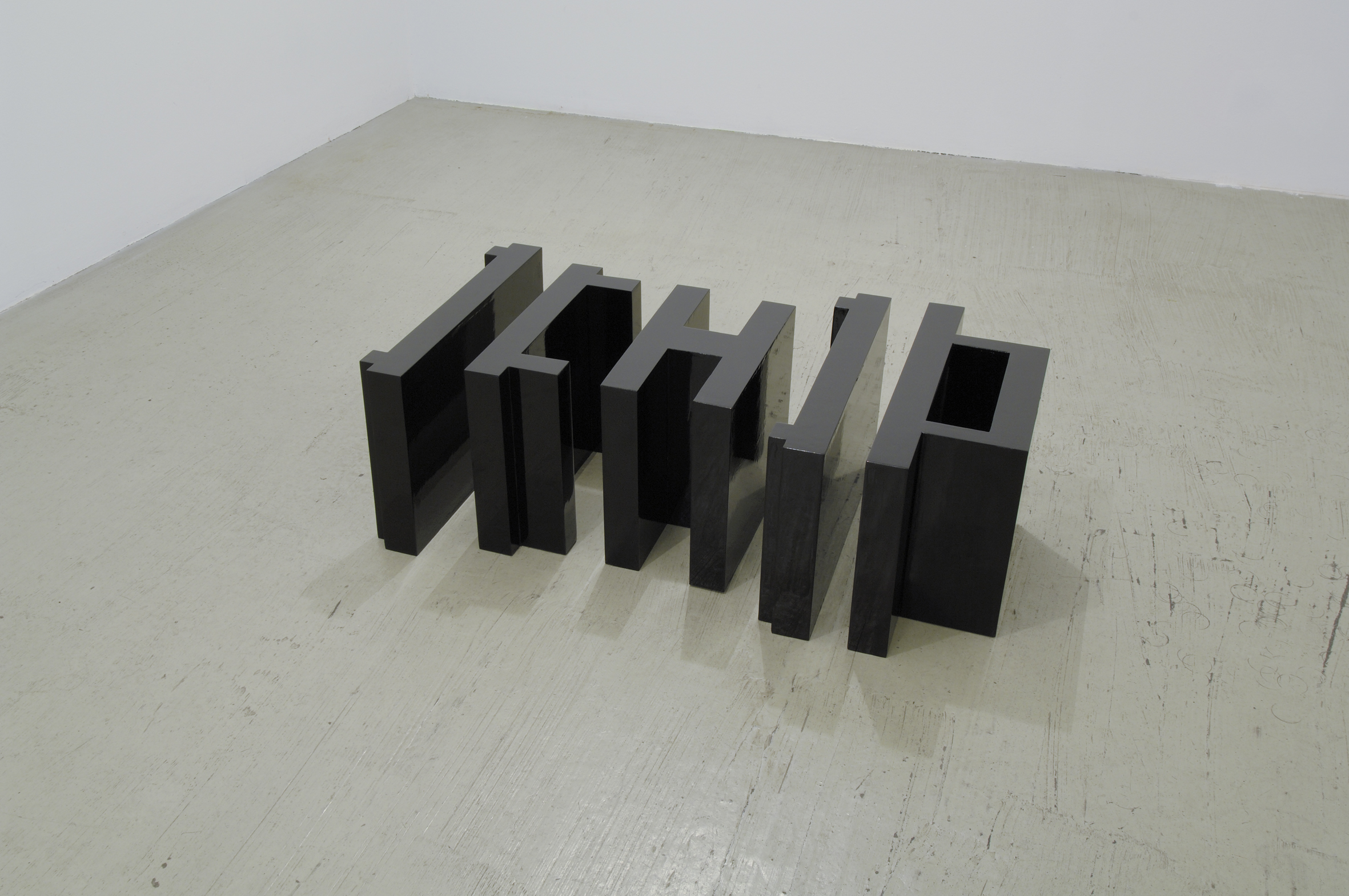
Ana Roldán, Truth, 2006, Wood, Lacquer, 105 × 56 × 36 cm

Roldán's interest in linguistics and the philosophy of language repeatedly leads to corresponding works. Exemplary is the sculpture Truth from 2006, which depicts the lettering truth and its reflection in three dimensions. If one does not know that the word is mirrored at the center line, one cannot decipher it and, like children or illiterates, is thrown back on incomprehensible signs. Furthermore, the title of the work plays with the claim to truth that words claim for themselves. In a site-specific installation for the headquarters of reinsurer Swiss Re, the terms Risk and Life become abstract chair backs. And in her multi-part bestiary, Roldán works directly with texts, and figures like the young curator and the female artist as beasts of the art world.

== Exhibitions ==
=== Single exhibition (selection) ===
- 2024: Dibujando un Círculo, Fomato Cómodo, Madrid
- 2023: Tell Me What Red Is..., Instituto de Visión, New York City
- 2022: Air, annex, 14, Zürich
- 2019: Physical Structures, annex14, Zurich
- 2019: Clear Opacity, Formato Cómodo, Madrid
- 2019: Material Art Fair, Mexico, Solo Booth Instituto de Visión
- 2018: Physical Structures, Instituto de Visión/Frieze, London
- 2016: No, annex14, Zurich
- 2015: Solo Projects: Focus Latinoamérica, with Instituto de Visión, Bogotá, Arco Madrid
- 2015: Take Position: Bodies and Plants, annex14, Zurich
- 2013: Drunk, High and Exhilaration, Florian Christopher, a show room, Zurich
- 2012: Espejo Negro, Formato Cómodo, Madrid
- 2011: Blank Back Mirror, Kunsthaus Langenthal, Langenthal
- 2011: Different Orders, annex14, Bern
- 2011: Forms of contemplation, ideal forms in compositions, Badischer Kunstverein, Karlsruhe
- 2010: Cococompositions, Dolores, Ellen de Brunije Projects, Amsterdam, curated by Karin Hasselberg
- 2009: Words to be looked at, objects to be read, Kunsthalle Arbon
- 2009: Picking holy words from the perfect ghost, homage to James Lee Byars, Kunstmuseum Bern
- 2009: As „the Myth of the hole“, annex14, Bern
- 2008: Observations on Modernity and Form, Statements / „Kunst“, Zurich art fair
- 2008: The Actor, Art Palace, World Trade Center Beijing, China
- 2008: Dance steps, Garash gallery, Mexiko-Stadt
- 2007: Comical, Magical, Musical, Black Box, Marks Blond Project, Bern
- 2006: Truth, annex14, Bern
- 2006: God is red/Gott ist rot, Amberg-Marti, Zurich
- 2006: Fable, Espace Libre, Biel
- 2005: Début, Marks Blond project, Bern
- 2005: Kill the beast, Yellow Submarine – Marks Blond Projekt bei Mark Divo, Häuser und wir, Zurich
- 2005: The mountain and the ground, Kunst in St. Peter und Paul, Bern
- 2004: The letter «O», Gallery Kunstkeller, Bern
- 2002: All is like all, Stadtgalerie, Bern
- 2001: Silver gelatine, Gallery Kabinett, Bern

=== Group exhibitions (selection) ===
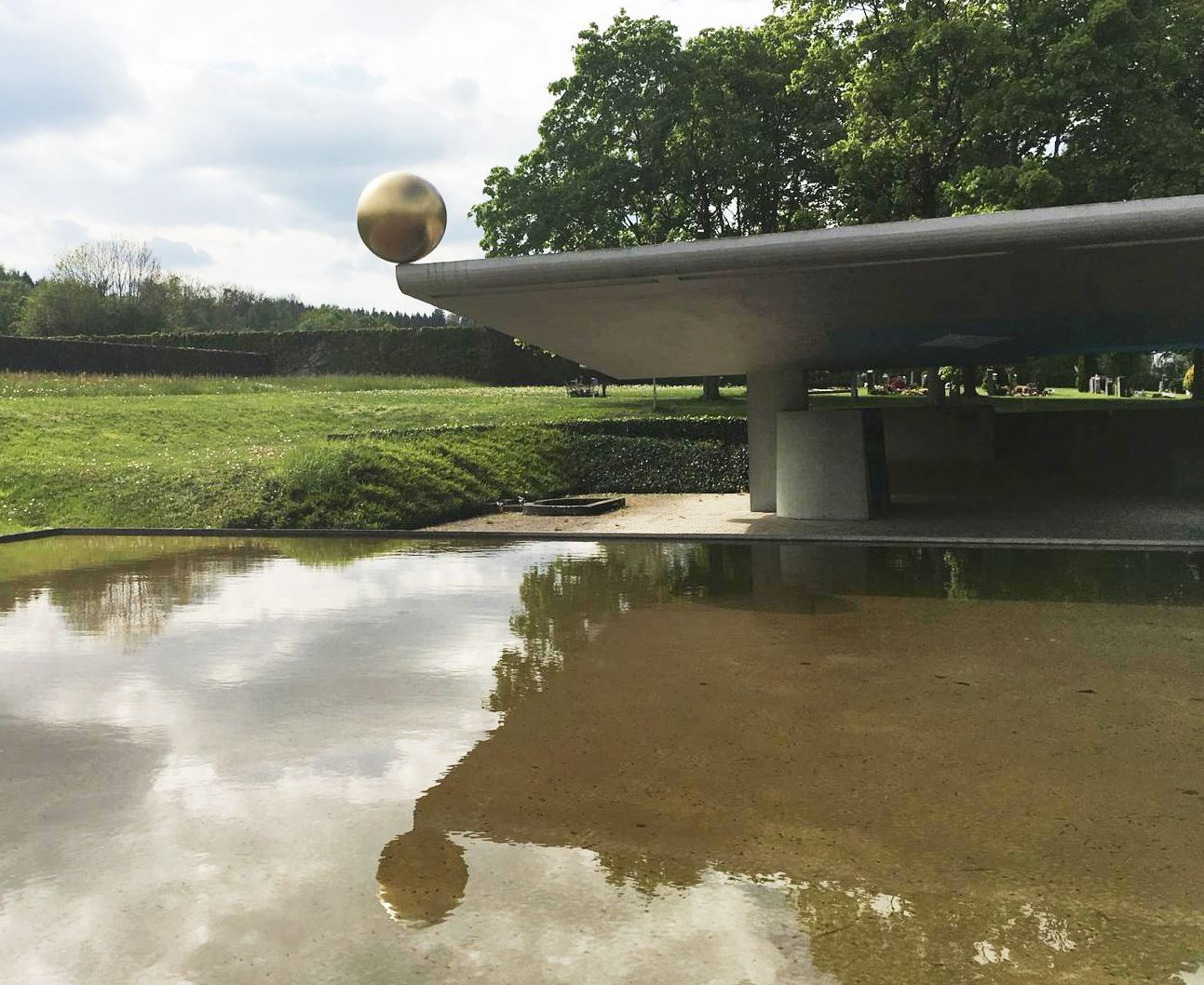
Enjoy the silence golden sphere, 2015, cemetery Eichbühl, Zurich

- 2024: Sound of Signs with Susan Hefuna & Andrea Sparta, annex 14
- 2020: Material Art Fair Mexico, Instituto de Visión
- 2019: Fifth Ural Biennial, kuratiert von Xiaoyu Weng
- 2019: Portadores de Sentido, Museo Amparo, Puebla, Mexiko
- 2017: Espejo negro, elefante blanco, curated by Fabiola Iza, Quarto de Maquinas, Mexiko-City.
- 2017: I was a wall, and my breasts were like fortress towers, Adam and Ollman, Portland, USA.
- 2016: New Buenos Aires, Corner College, Zürich, curated by Damian Christinger, Dimitrina Sevova, co-curated by Silvan Kälin.
- 2015: The Lulennial: A Slight Gestuary, curated by Fabiola Iza & Chris Sharp, Mexiko-Stadt.
- 2014: Blackboard – White Page, Kantonsschule Oerlikon, Zürich, curated by Maud Châtelet und Ana Roldán.
- 2013: LUPA, curated by Abaseh Mirvali für Art Rio, Rio de Janeiro.
- 2012: La jeunesse est un art – Jubiläum Manor art price, Aargauer Kunsthaus, Aarau
- 2012: Surplus Authors mit Falke Pisano, curated by Defne Ayas and Philippe Pirotte, Witte de With, Rotterdam.
- 2012: Popo de Paris, curated by Beatriz Lopez for Sultana Paris
- 2011: Môtiers – Art en plein air
- 2011: “Free Fall I” with Dieter Meier, Thomas Haemmerli, Sitki Kosemen, curated by Magda Guruli, Georgian National Gallery, Tbilisi, Georgia
- 2010: Distant Memories, curated by Hélène Joye-Cagnard und Catherine Kohler, Kunstmuseum Solothurn, Solothurn.
- 2010: Formal reiterations and the end of the world, with Athene Galiciadis, Garash, Mexiko-City.
- 2009: Made in China, Kunstmuseum Bern
- 2009: Turn on, Tune in, Drop Out, 798 Beijing Biennale, curated by Nicoykatiushka, Beijing.
- 2009: The Conspiracy/Die Verschwörung, with Falke Pisano Kunsthalle Bern.
- 2008: Acting Joe, George und Mr. Seek, with Falke Pisano, Wartesaal, Zürich.
- 2008: Mão Dupla/Stopover, curated by Evangelina Seiler and Sarah Zürcher, SESC Pinheiros, São Paulo.
- 2004: Es war einmal, Kunstmuseum Thun, Thun
- 2004: Identität, Kunstraum Baden

== Films ==
- 2016: Bones and Bananas
- 2015: Dialog
- 2011: How to do Shakespeare
- 2008: Construction concerned with the relationship between dissimilar emotional values in a composition with black and white
- 2003: Flags
- 2002: Fortschritt
- 2001: Silver Gelatine

== Recognition ==
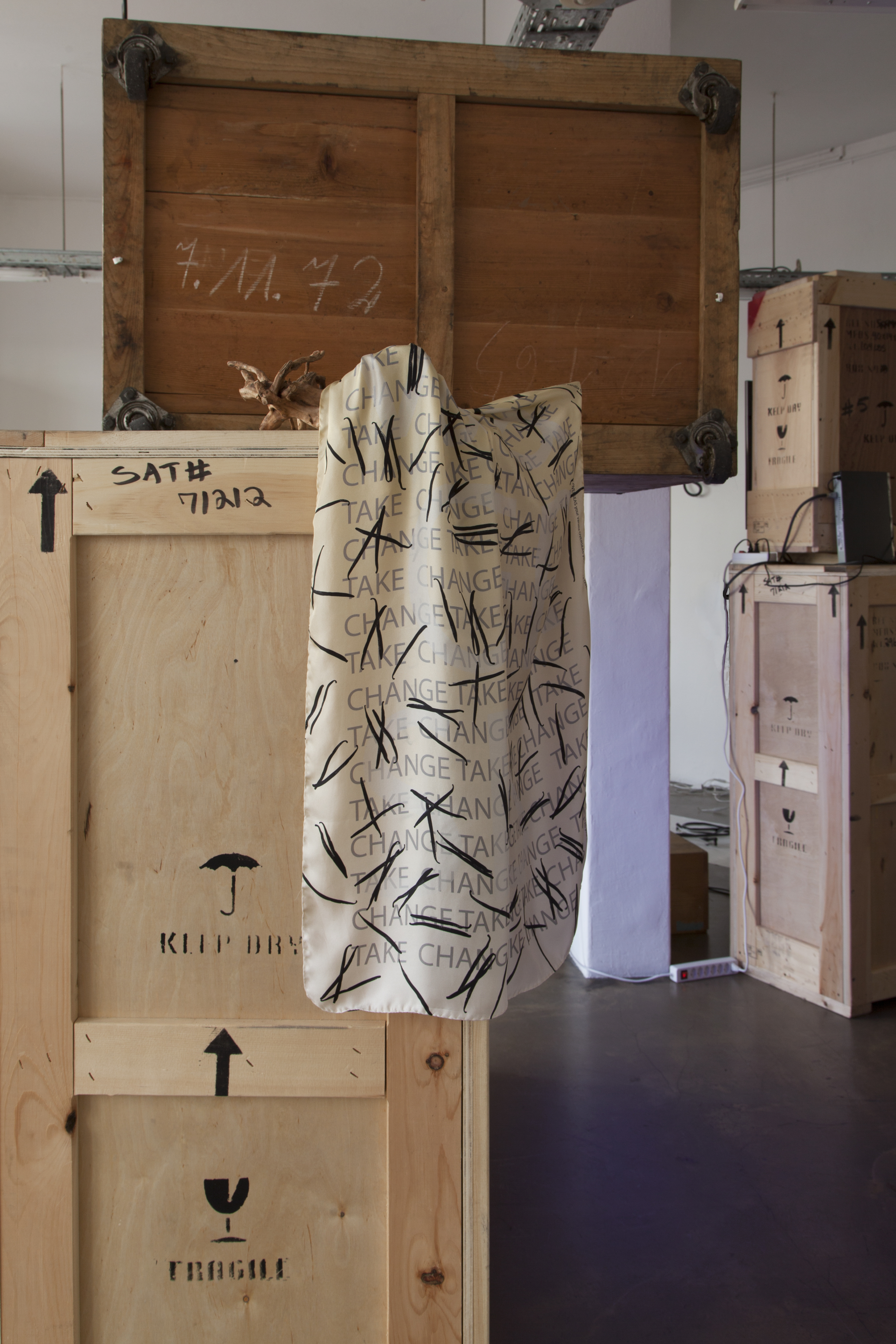
Ana Roldán, Vanilla Overseas, 2016, Silk, 100 × 100 cm. (Installation view at Corner College, Zürich, Switzerland)

- 2017: Competition art on building for the island Rheinau - Structural engineering office of the Canton of Zurich, Switzerland .
- 2010: Work contribution of the Canton of Zurich, Switzerland. for Blank Black Mirror
- 2009: Work scholarship of the City of Zurich, Switzerland
- 2007: Work contribution of the Canton of Zurich
- 2007: Studio scholarship of the city of Zurich in Kunming, China
- 2006: Swiss Art Award
- 2005: Swiss Art Award
- 2003: Corti Aeschliman Stiftung, scholarship
