= Gustavo Aguerre =

Argentine multidisciplinary artist

- Born: Gustavo Aguerre; Buenos Aires, Argentina
- Occupations: Photographer, curator, writer, and theatre designer
- Years active: 1976– present
- Known for: Photographing, writing and theatre designing

Gustavo Aguerre (born 1953 in Buenos Aires, Argentina) is an artist, photographer, curator, writer, and theatre designer.

== Career ==
Aguerre studied at the Munich Art Academy between 1974 and 1976. He subsequently moved to Sweden. In collaboration with his wife, Ingrid Falk, he set up an art collective in Stockholm called FA+ in 1992. Amongst the artists who have worked with FA+ are Nicola Pellegrini, Otonella Mocellin, Daniel Wetter, Lennie Lee.

Aguerre and Falk have worked on a number of site-specific installations throughout Europe. These involve large-scale installations, photographic projections, sculptures, and video installations in Stockholm.

== Exhibitions ==
He has exhibited in museums and private galleries including:

- Malmo Museum, Sweden (1996)
- Rich and Famous Gallery, London (1998)
- Italian Pavilion Venice Biennale (1999)
- Galeria Milano (1999)
- ARCO, Madrid (2000)
- Museo bellas Artes, Buenos Aires
- Konstnarhuset, Stockholm
- Sternersenmuseet, Oslo
- Tirana Biennial, Albania (2001)
- Reykjavik Art Museum, Iceland (2002)
- National Center of Contemporary Art (2005)
