= Marcel Słodki =

Polish artist

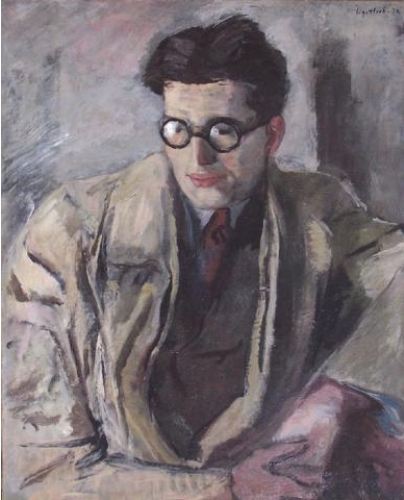
- A (presumed) portrait of Słodki by Leopold Gottlieb, early 1930s
- Born: Marceli Słodki; 11 November 1892; Łódź, Congress Poland, Russian Empire
- Died: 1944 (aged 51–52); Auschwitz concentration camp
- Education: Academy of Fine Arts, Munich
- Known for: Painting
- Movement: Post-Impressionism; Dada; Kapists

Marcel Słodki (Polish: Marceli Słodki; 11 November 1892 – 1943/1944) was a Polish painter, graphic artist and stage designer. He was Post-Impressionist associated with the dadaist movement. He died during World War II, after being arrested in France and sent to the Nazi German Auschwitz concentration camp c. 1943–1944.

== Biography ==
Słodki was born to a secular, liberal Jewish family in Łódź (then part of the Russian Empire). His father was a bank director. From 1910 to 1913 Słodki studied in Munich at the Academy of Fine Arts and then spent the next year travelling through Europe.

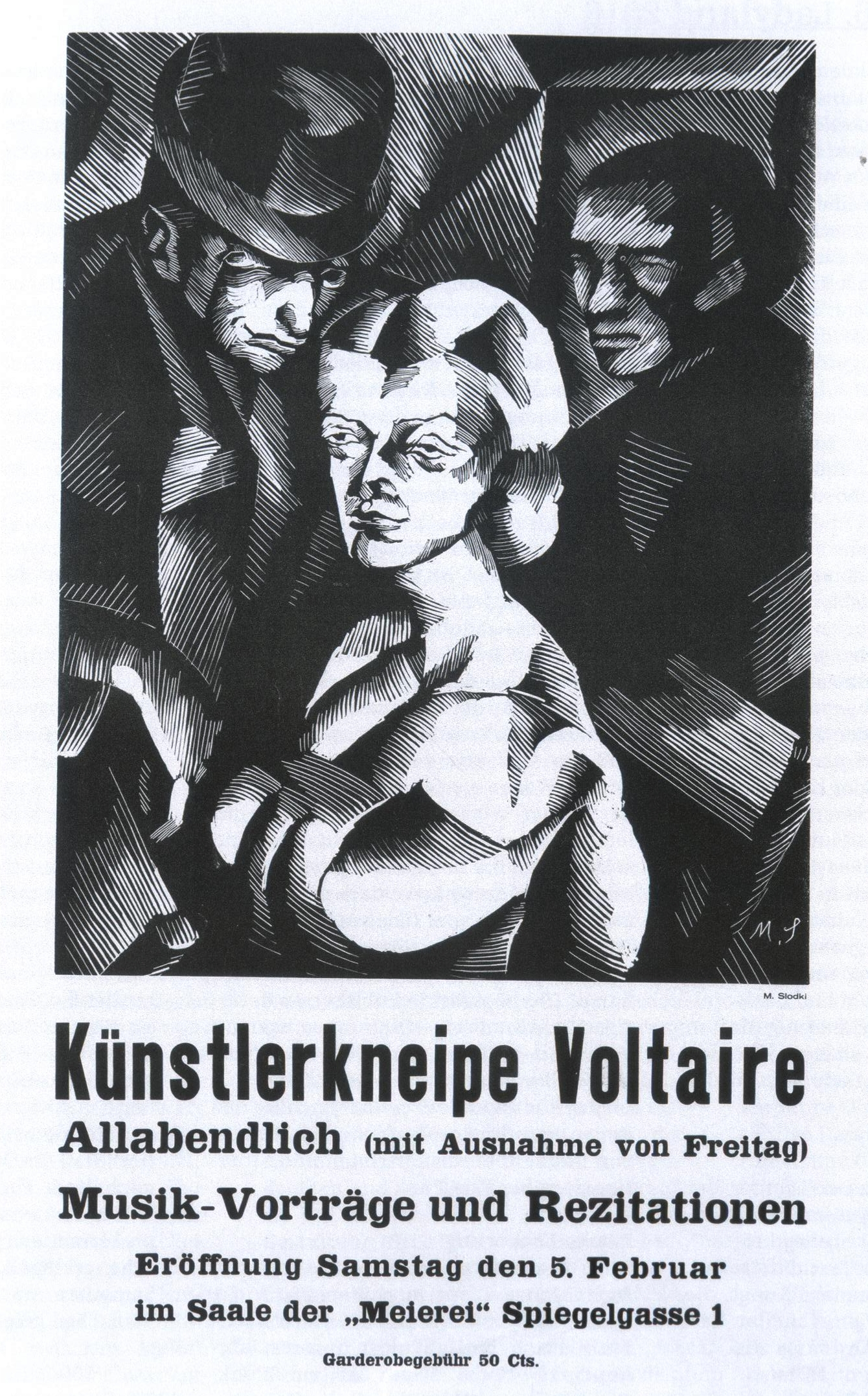
Poster for the opening of Cabaret Voltaire, lithograph by Marcel Słodki

He moved to Switzerland in 1914, where for a time he worked with architects designing town plans. He became involved early on with the Dada art movement. He designed the poster for the 1916 opening of Dadaist performance at Cabaret Voltaire in Zürich. His work was presented there beginning in 1917, and he held his first individual exhibition, also in Zürich, in 1919. From 1921 to 1924 he lived in Germany, where he designed theater sets for the cabaret Die wilde Bühne and worked on the Berlin magazine Die Aktion. Later, he moved to France. His works were shown at several exhibitions, including Salon des indépendants (Paris, 1928), an exhibition in Bruges (1933), an exhibition in Warsaw (1934, possibly related to Żydowskie Towarzystwo Krzewienia Sztuk Pięknych), Salon d'Automne (Paris, 1937), and an exhibition in London (1938).

He married a painter, Macha Boulanger.

Following the German invasion and occupation of France, he lived in Brive-la-Gaillarde, first continuing with his public work, even exhibiting it, but eventually going into hiding. He was arrested in 1943 in Paris, but was released or escaped (accounts vary). He hid in woodlands near Paris, and then moved to Bourg-Saint-Maurice, Chambéry (then under Italian occupation). After the Germans took control of Chambéry, he was arrested again, on 14 December 1943, and was sent to the Auschwitz concentration camp where he died within a year.

== Works ==
His art style is described as post-impressionist. He has been associated with the Dada art movement, as well as the Polish Kapists art movement. His early works were also influenced by Cubism, but most did not survive, as they were destroyed by the artist himself in an act he later regretted. Most of his paintings are landscapes and still lifes, although he created some portraits as well as several paintings of fishermen and circus artists.
