= Tenderenda the Fantast =

1967 novella by Hugo Ball

- Author: Hugo Ball
- Original title: Tenderenda der Phantast
- Translator: Malcolm Green
- Language: German
- Publisher: Die Arche
- Publication date: 1967
- Publication place: Switzerland
- English publication date: 1995
- Pages: 135

Tenderenda the Fantast (German: Tenderenda der Phantast) is a novella by the German writer Hugo Ball. Set in fantastical locations, it consists of episodic chapters and functions as an allegorical story about the creation of the Dada movement in Zurich and Ball's eventual disillusionment with it. The novella is characterised by satire and personal world-weariness. Ball described it as part commentary on the life he had lived, part exorcism against the aspects of the world he personally wished to abandon.

Ball wrote the texts that form the book between the autumn of 1914 and July 1920. Significant parts were performed on stage at Dada soirées, but it was first published posthumously in 1967 by Die Arche in Zurich. It was published in English translation by Malcolm Green in 1995 in the volume Blago Bung, Blago Bung, Bosso Fataka! The First Texts of German Dada. An English-language edition translated and illustrated by Jonathan Hammer was published in 2002.
