= Emmy Hennings =

German poet and performer

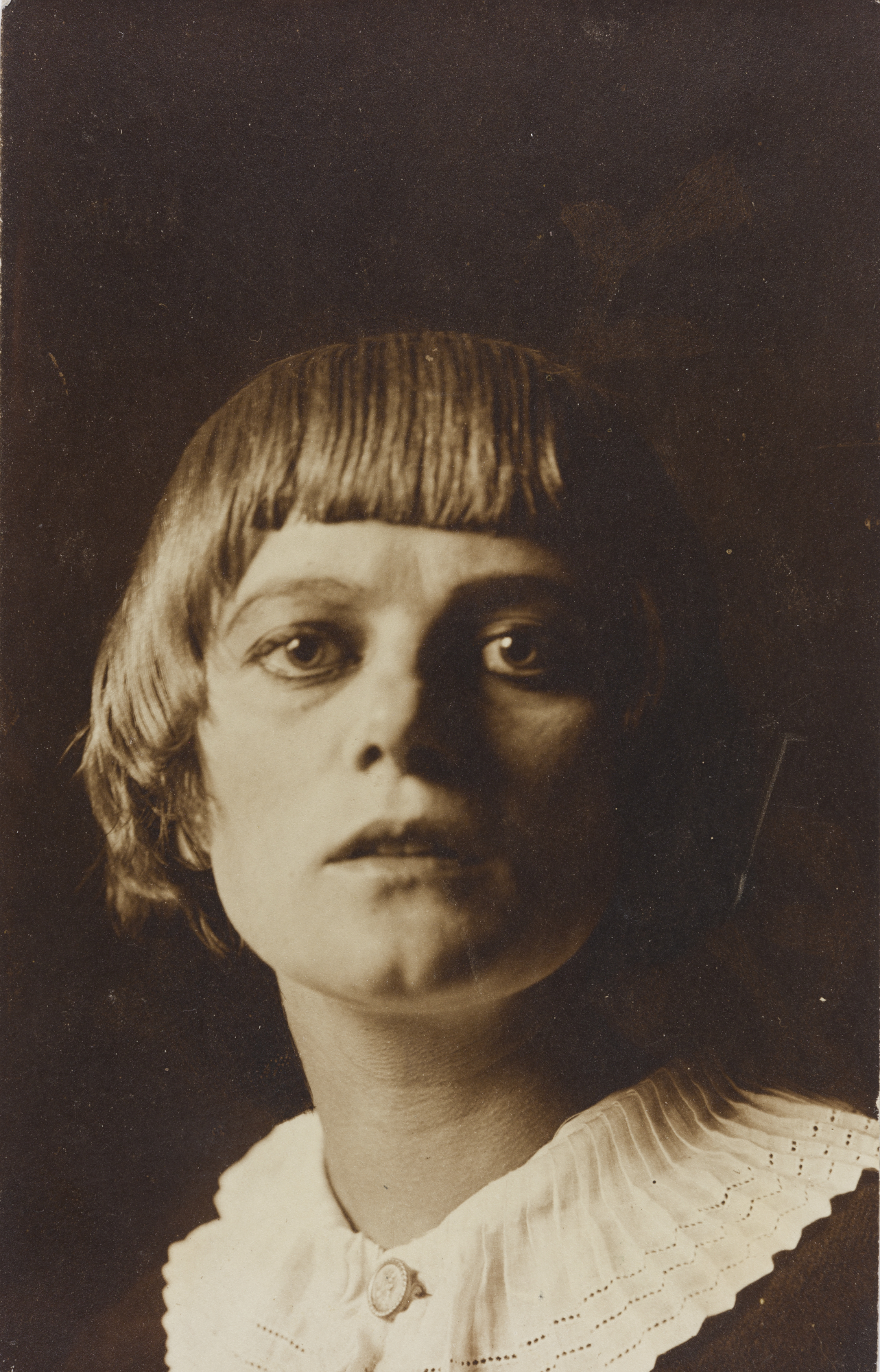
- Born: Emma Maria Cordsen; 17 January 1885; Flensburg, German Empire
- Died: 10 August 1948 (aged 63); Sorengo, Switzerland

Emmy Hennings (born Emma Maria Cordsen, 17 January 1885 – 10 August 1948) was a German poet and performing artist, and co-founder of the Dadaist Cabaret Voltaire with her second husband Hugo Ball.

Known as the "star of the show," Hennings has been the subject of numerous creative works, including a best-selling novel, a graphic novel, short films and various works of visual art.

== Life and work ==
Hennings was born on 17 January 1885 in Flensburg, German Empire, to Ernst Cordsen, a sailor, who died young. She described herself later as "a seaman's child".

In 1906, after ending her first marriage to an actor, losing a son, and leaving her daughter to grow up with her grandmother, Hennings became an itinerant performer, traveling over much of the European continent. She was a performer at the Cabaret Simplizissimus in Munich, when she met Ball in 1913. At the time, Hennings was already a published poet, whose works had appeared in the left-wing publications Pan and Die Aktion. In 1913 she also published a short poetry collection titled Ether Poems (Äthergedichte in German). Later, Hennings was a contributor to the magazine Revolution, founded by Ball and Hans Leybold.

Hennings and Ball moved to Zürich in 1915, where they took part in the founding of the Cabaret Voltaire, which marked the beginning of the Dada movement.

Hennings was a morphine user and an occasional prostitute.

Before they launched the Cabaret Voltaire, the two struggled to make a living in Zürich during the early days of WW1. They toured, performing mostly in hotels around Switzerland. Hennings sang, did puppetry, and danced to music composed by Ball. She also recited her own poetry. In 1916 Ball and Hennings created Arabella, their own ensemble troupe, where Hennings performed under the name Dagny.

On 5 February 1916, Hennings and Hugo founded the Cabaret Voltaire at Spiegelgasse 1, 8001 Zürich. Hennings was a regular performer at the Cabaret Voltaire. Her performances included a role in the German premiere of Das Leben des Menschen (The Life of a Man) by playwright Leonid Andreev, in which she appeared with Ball. Hennings also performed in Krippenspiel, a piece written by Ball.

Hennings married Ball on 21 February 1920. They had no children together. However, Hennings had a daughter, Annemarie, from a previous relationship, who took fondly to Ball. Hennings, who outlived Ball by two decades, lived in Magliaso, Switzerland from 1942 to 1948. She died on 10 August 1948 at a clinic in Sorengo, Switzerland.

Hennings was a Catholic and survived the Spanish flu.

== Works ==
- Die letzte Freude. (Gedichtband) Kurt Wolff, Leipzig 1913 (= Der jüngste Tag, Band 5)
- Gefängnis. (Roman) Reiß, Berlin 1919 (Neuauflage 2019, ISBN 978-3-7437-3099-1).
- Das Brandmal. Ein Tagebuch. Reiß, Berlin 1920.
- Helle Nacht. (Gedichtband) Reiß, Berlin 1922.
- Das ewige Lied. Reiß, Berlin 1923.
- Der Gang zur Liebe. Ein Buch von Städten, Kirchen und Heiligen. Kösel & Pustet, München 1926.
- Hugo Ball. Sein Leben in Briefen und Gedichten. (mit einem Vorwort von Hermann Hesse) Fischer, Berlin 1930.
- Hugo Balls Weg zu Gott. Ein Buch der Erinnerung. Kösel & Pustet, München 1931.
- Die Geburt Jesu. Für Kinder erzählt. Glock, Nürnberg 1932.
- Blume und Flamme. Geschichte einer Jugend. Benziger, Einsiedeln / Köln 1938 (Neuauflage 2022, ISBN 978-3-7437-4346-5).
- Der Kranz. (Gedichtband) Benziger, Einsiedeln / Köln 1939.
- Das flüchtige Spiel. Wege und Umwege einer Frau. Benziger, Einsiedeln / Köln 1940.
- Märchen am Kamin. Benziger, Einsiedeln / Köln 1943
- Das irdische Paradies und andere Legenden. Stocker, Luzern 1945.

== Legacy ==
In The Magic Bishop: Hugo Ball, Dada Poet, author Erdmute Wenzel White writes that Hennings “was admired by expressionists as the incarnation of the cabaret artist of her time ... The shining star of the Voltaire, according to the Züricher Post (Zürich Post), her role in Dada has not been adequately acknowledged.” (p. 11).

White also cites a poem by Johannes Becher, which he uses as evidence that Emmy served as a muse for other artists of the time:

"It was in Munich, at the Café Stefanie,
Where I recited for you, Emmy, poems
That I dared tell only you,"

Family member Julian Schütt has commented on her eclipse and re-emergence as a central artistic figure of the early twentieth century: "Suddenly my great-grandmother is on YouTube – although for a long time she was only considered an ecstatic groupie"

== In popular culture ==
The German emo band 125, Rue Montmartre featured Emmy Hennings on the cover of their split 7" with Maggat (1999).

The 2024 novel, "What was Beautiful and Good" tells a story of Emmy Hennings.

== Sources ==
- Flight Out of Time: A Dada Diary, by Hugo Ball
- Emmy Ball-Hennings: Leben im Vielleicht by Bärbel Reetz. Frankfurt: Suhrkamp, 2001
- Emmy Ball-Hennings: Wege und Umwege zum Paradies: Biographie by René Gass. Zürich: Pendo, 1998
- The Magic Bishop: Hugo Ball, Dada Poet by Erdmute Wenzel White
- Hemus, Ruth (2009). Dada's Women. Yale University Press. ISBN 978-0-300-14148-1.
- Viñas, Fernando González (2020). Alles ist Dada: Emmy Ball-Hennings (in German). avant-verlag. ISBN 978-3-96445-034-0.
