= Critique of the German Intelligentsia =

1919 book by Hugo Ball

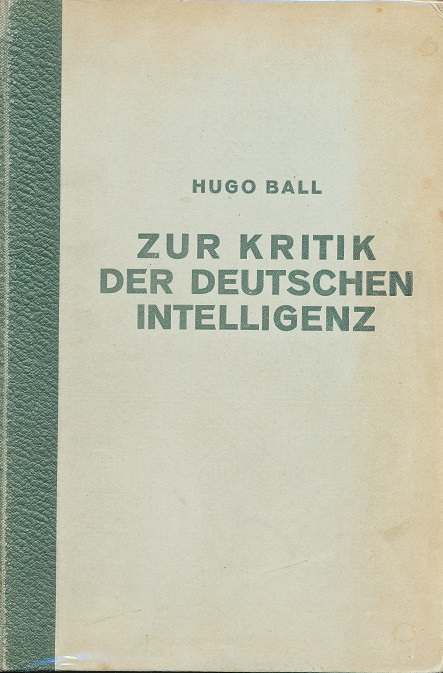
- Author: Hugo Ball
- Original title: Zur Kritik der deutschen Intelligenz
- Translator: Brian L. Harris
- Language: Germany
- Genre: polemic
- Publisher: Der Freie Verlag
- Publication date: 1919
- Publication place: Switzerland
- English publication date: November 1993
- Pages: 327

Critique of the German Intelligentsia (German: Zur Kritik der deutschen Intelligenz) is a 1919 polemical book by the German writer Hugo Ball.

== Summary ==
The book is a critical examination of German culture, philosophy and political life in relation to World War I and its disastrous consequences for Europe. Ball rails against German philosophers and the prominence of absolutism and militarism in German culture. He attributes these features to the Protestant Reformation to which he connects his major villains, notably Martin Luther, Immanuel Kant, Georg Wilhelm Friedrich Hegel, Karl Marx and Otto von Bismarck. Ball holds up Russian and French Catholic thinkers as positive counterexamples. As his preferred way forward, Ball proposes a synthesis of anarchism and Catholicism, which he wants to see developed by religious intellectuals operating outside of both state and church structures.

== Publication ==
Der Freie Verlag in Bern published the book in 1919. Some later editions omit portions where Ball held Jews and Jewish theology responsible for parts of what he criticised. This was the case with the second and third German-language editions, published in 1970 and 1980 respectively.

Brian L. Harris produced an English translation of the original edition for his 1979 doctoral dissertation. It was published by Columbia University Press in November 1993.

== See also ==
- Christian anarchism
