= Hans Leybold =

German poet (1892–1914)

Hans Leybold (2 April 1892 – 8 September 1914) was a German expressionist poet, whose small body of work was a major inspiration behind much of the Dada movement, in particular the works of his close friend Hugo Ball. Although Leybold died two years before the emergence of Dada, his absurdist writings and poems represent an important stage in the development of expressionist movement in Germany.

Born into a middle-class family in Frankfurt am Main, Leybold was raised in Hamburg where he completed his schooling in 1911 and joined the German Army. In his compulsory year of conscription he impressed his superior officers so much he was offered a commission and embarked on a military career. Taking a leave of absence to attend university, Leybold traveled to Munich to study German literature and whilst there he fell in with the crowd of German poets and authors who would head the Dada movement post-war. These figures included Richard Huelsenbeck, Emmy Hennings, Klabund, Johannes R. Becher, Franz Jung and most importantly of all his particular friend Hugo Ball. It was Ball who interested Leybold in the expressionist movement and soon the two of them were soon producing poetry together under the pseudonym Ha Hu Baley. In the company of these authors, Leybold experimented wildly with technique and imagery in his poetry, seeking both to develop his skills and in the process deconstruct poetry itself, heavily influenced by Alfred Kerr and Friedrich Nietzsche. In consequence of his literary experimentation, his studies went neglected and he began to edit and contribute to expressionist magazines, such as Die Aktion and his own work, the short lived magazine Revolution, in which he and his colleagues issued their literary manifesto.

"Protect yourself against responsibilities! Hit out: against old household rubbish! And if some valuable piece gets torn up in the process: what does it matter? You respected people! You well-polished ones! You bigwigs! We ought to stick our tongues out at you! Boys, you'll say. Old men! we'll reply"

In August 1914 the First World War erupted and Leybold was immediately called up as an active reservist. Less than a month later, Leybold was seriously wounded during operations near Namur and was evacuated to a casualty clearing hospital. He recovered rapidly from his wound but on 8 September, the night he returned to his regiment, he committed suicide by gunshot to the head. His death was never fully explained, although a rumour persisted that he had syphilis and had given up on survival following his wound. His works were collected together many years after his death, as he never had a book published independently, and he is now recognised as an important influence both on Dadism and German expressionism itself.
