= Jan Theiler =

German artist, musician and political activist

Jan Theiler alias Pastor Leumund (born 1967) is a German artist, musician and political activist.

In the 1990s, he was an influential curator, performance artist and musician on the underground scene organising large-scale music and performance events at various venues in East-Berlin including the Duncker14, K77, Prater, Kule, Kunsthaus Tacheles and many more.

In 1997, he took part in the Labyrinth festival, in the Torpedo Hallen, Copenhagen. In 1999, he exhibited at the Rich and Famous gallery, London.

He was one of a number of artists including Mark Divo, the Mikry Drei, Lennie Lee and Dan Jones to have squatted the Cabaret Voltaire (Zürich) in the February 2002, in an attempt to revive the Dada movement.

He became well known in Zürich as a spokesman for the neo-dadaists. He curated the second (Sihlpapier 2003), third (Toilethouses 2004) and fourth (Pornokino 2005) Dada festival together with Mark Divo in Zürich.

In 2005, he was included in the Real Biennale at the Kinský Palace, Prague. In 2005, he also attempted to set up a political party known as the Berg Party during the struggle for the Palast der Republik. In 2011, the Party merged with the squatters party, becoming Bergpartei, die ÜberPartei. Jan Theiler remaines chairman of the party.
