= Flight out of Time =

1927 book by Hugo Ball

- Title page for Flight out of Time: A Dada Diary (1974 edition)
- Author: Hugo Ball
- Original title: Die Flucht aus der Zeit
- Language: German
- Publisher: Duncker & Humblot
- Publication date: 1927
- Publication place: Germany
- English publication date: 1 October 1974
- Pages: 332

Flight out of Time: A Dada Diary (German: Die Flucht aus der Zeit) is a 1927 book by the German writer Hugo Ball. It is an edited version of Ball's diaries from the years 1913 to 1921, which includes his time in the Dada movement at Cabaret Voltaire in Zurich, as well as his quick rejection of Dada and modern literature in general. The book consists of personal notes and excerpts from mystical and anarchist literature.

The original diaries are lost so it is unknown to what extent Ball changed their content, but the changes were made to emphasise a trajectory away from Dadaism and anarchism and toward Ball's later interest in Catholic theology. Ball's wife Emmy Hennings described the book in a letter as a "very edited diary" and "by no means directly copied" from the original texts. The title Flight out of Time is a reference to monastic life. The book was published a few months before Ball's death at the age of 41.
