= Hugo Ball =

German author and poet (1886–1927)

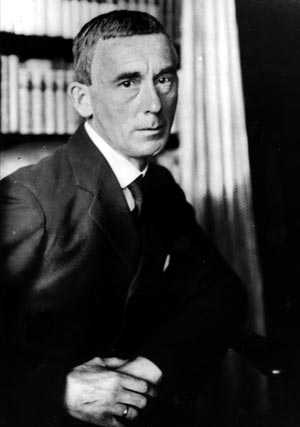
- Ball in 1916
- Born: 22 February 1886; Pirmasens, Germany
- Died: 14 September 1927 (aged 41); Sant'Abbondio (Gentilino), Switzerland
- Occupations: Author; poet
- Known for: Poetry
- Movement: Dada

Hugo Ball (German: [bal]; 22 February 1886 – 14 September 1927) was a German author, poet, and essentially the founder of the Dada movement in European art in Zürich in 1916. Among other accomplishments, he was a pioneer in the development of sound poetry. His best known works include the "Dada Manifesto", the Dadaist nonsense poem "Karawane", the poetry collection 7 schizophrene Sonette, the edited diary Flight out of Time, the Christian anarchist polemic book Critique of the German Intelligentsia and the novels Flametti, or The Dandyism of the Poor and Tenderenda the Fantast.

== Life and work ==
Hugo Ball was born in Pirmasens, Germany, and was raised in a middle-class Catholic family. He studied sociology and philosophy at the Ludwig-Maximilians-Universität München and Heidelberg University (1906–1907). In 1910, he moved to Berlin in order to become an actor and collaborated with Max Reinhardt. At the beginning of World War I, he tried joining the army as a volunteer, but was denied enlistment for medical reasons. After witnessing the invasion of Belgium, he was disillusioned, saying: "The war is founded on a glaring mistake – men have been confused with machines." Considered a traitor in his country, he crossed the frontier with the cabaret performer and poet Emmy Hennings, whom he would marry in 1920, and settled in Zürich, Switzerland. There, Ball continued his interest in anarchism and in Mikhail Bakunin in particular; he also worked on a book of translations of works by Bakunin, which never got published. Although interested in anarchist philosophy, he nonetheless rejected it for its militant aspects, and viewed it as only a means to his personal goal of socio-political enlightenment.

In 1916, Hugo Ball created the Dada Manifesto, making a political statement about his views on the terrible state of society and acknowledging his dislike for philosophies of the past that claimed to possess the ultimate truth. In the manifesto Ball aimed to legitimize the new artistic movement's ambition, to create an entirely new language, because the old language was viewed as "doomed", and "ruined by the filthy hands of capital". The ambition in creating new words was in response to Ball's critique of "honored poets who are always writing with words but never writing the word itself".

The central thought of modernism since Baudelaire regarding that the language has to be fixed, is here given a distinctive critique of economy as a motivation. The same year as the Manifesto, in 1916, Ball wrote his poem "Karawane", a poem consisting of nonsensical words. The meaning, however, resides in its meaninglessness, reflecting the chief principle behind Dadaism. Some of his other best known works include the poem collection 7 schizophrene Sonette, the drama Die Nase des Michelangelo, a memoir of the Zürich period Flight Out of Time: A Dada Diary, and a biography of Hermann Hesse, entitled Hermann Hesse. Sein Leben und sein Werk (1927).

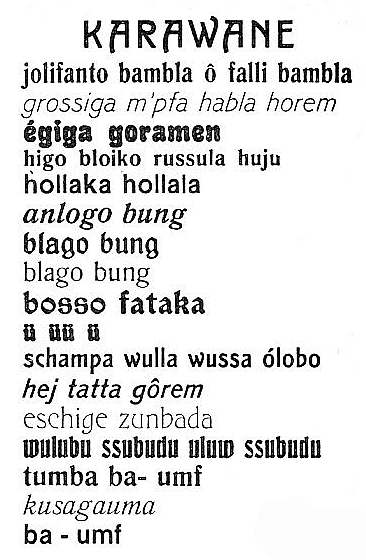
Ball's 1916 poem, "Karawane"

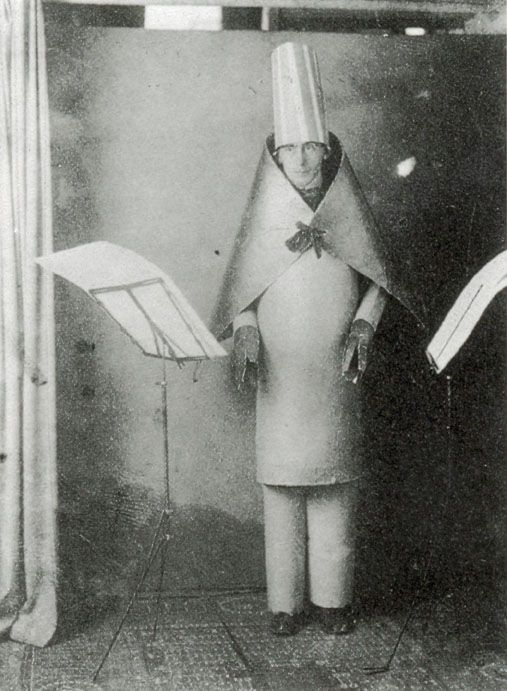
Ball, reading "Karawane", Club Voltaire, 1916

As co-founder of the Cabaret Voltaire and a magazine with the same name, Cabaret Voltaire, in Zürich, he led the Dada movement in Zürich and is one of the people credited with naming the movement "Dada," by allegedly choosing the word at random from a dictionary. His companion and future wife, Emmy Hennings, was also a member of Dada.

His involvement with the Dada movement lasted approximately two years. He then worked for a short period as a journalist for Die Freie Zeitung in Bern. After returning to Catholicism in July 1920, Ball retired to the canton of Ticino, where he lived a religious and relatively poor life with Emmy Hennings. He contributed to the journal Hochland during this time. He also began the process of revising his diaries from 1910 to 1921, which were later published under the title Flight out of Time. These diaries provide a wealth of information concerning the people and events of the Zürich Dada movement. He died in Sant'Abbondio (Gentilino), Switzerland, of stomach cancer on 14 September 1927.

== Adaptations ==
Ball's poem "Gadji beri bimba" was adapted to the song "I Zimbra" on the 1979 Talking Heads album Fear of Music. Ball received a writing credit for the song on the track listing.

The song contains these lines:

Gadji beri bimba clandridi
Lauli lonni cadori gadjam
A bim beri glassala glandride
E glassala tuffm I zimbra

The complete "Gadji beri bimba" poem by Ball reads:

gadji beri bimba glandridi laula lonni cadori
gadjama gramma berida bimbala glandri galassassa laulitalomini
gadji beri bin blassa glassala laula lonni cadorsu sassala bim
gadjama tuffm i zimzalla binban gligla wowolimai bin beri ban
o katalominai rhinozerossola hopsamen laulitalomini hoooo
gadjama rhinozerossola hopsamen
bluku terullala blaulala loooo

zimzim urullala zimzim urullala zimzim zanzibar zimzalla zam
elifantolim brussala bulomen brussala bulomen tromtata
velo da bang band affalo purzamai affalo purzamai lengado tor
gadjama bimbalo glandridi glassala zingtata pimpalo ögrögöööö
viola laxato viola zimbrabim viola uli paluji malooo

tuffm im zimbrabim negramai bumbalo negramai bumbalo tuffm i zim
gadjama bimbala oo beri gadjama gaga di gadjama affalo pinx
gaga di bumbalo bumbalo gadjamen
gaga di bling blong
gaga blung

A voice-cut-up collage of his poem "Karawane" by German artist Kommissar Hjuler, member of Boris Lurie's NO!art movement, was released on an LP on the Greek Shamanic Trance label in 2010. "Karawane" was also set to music in 2012 by Australian composer Stephen Whittington, as an "anti-song cycle" of seventeen songs — one for each line of the poem, lasting approximately two minutes each. The same poem and its historical context was used by Esa-Pekka Salonen for his 28-minute composition Karawane for mixed choir and orchestra.

== Bibliography ==
- Die Nase des Michelangelo. Tragikomödie in vier Auftritten, 1911
- Der Henker von Brescia. Drei Akte der Not und Ekstase, 1914
- Flametti oder Vom Dandysmus der Armen. Roman. Reiss, Berlin 1918
- Zur Kritik der deutschen Intelligenz. Der Freie Verlag, Bern 1919
  - redeveloped as: Die Folgen der Reformation. Duncker & Humblot, München 1924
- Byzantinisches Christentum. Drei Heiligenleben (on Joannes Klimax, Dionysius Areopagita und Symeon dem Styliten). Duncker & Humblot, München 1923
- Hermann Hesse. Sein Leben und sein Werk. S. Fischer, Berlin 1927
- Die Flucht aus der Zeit (Diary). Duncker & Humblot, München 1927
- Gesammelte Gedichte mit Photos und Faksimiles, ed.. Annemarie Schütt-Hennings. Arche, Zürich 1963
- Tenderenda der Phantast. Roman. Arche, Zürich 1967

Bibliography in English

- Flight Out of Time: A Dada Diary. Translated by Ann Raimes. New York: Viking Press. 1974. ISBN 0-670-31841-8.
- Critique of the German Intelligentsia. Translated by Brian Harris. Columbia University Press. 1993. ISBN 9780231075268.
- Blago Bung, Blago Bung, Hugo Ball's Tenderenda the Fantast, Richard Huelsenbeck's Fantastic Prayers, and Walter Serner's Last Loosening – three key texts of Zürich ur-Dada. Translated and introduced by Malcolm Green. Atlas Press, ISBN 0-947757-86-4
- Flametti, or The Dandyism of the Poor, trans. Catherine Schelbert, Wakefield Press, Massachusetts, 2014, ISBN 978-1-939663-03-0
- What was Beautiful and Good, (Was schön war und gut), Jill Blocker, Münster Verlag, Switzerland, 2023, English: ISBN 978-1-916964-33-4 in German: ISBN 3907301617

== See also ==
- Hans Arp
- Emmy Hennings
- Richard Huelsenbeck
- Hans Leybold
- Hans Richter
- Walter Serner
- Tristan Tzara
