= Shahin Afrassiabi =

Iranian artist

- Born: Iran
- Education: Goldsmiths College

Shahin Afrassiabi (born 1963, in Tehran) is an artist and author who has been based in London, Berlin and Spain.

His early work can be characterised as mixed media installations, using everyday building materials and domestic objects in juxtaposition, including use of shop window displays as a motif. It has been suggested his work is influenced by architectural practice and early 20th century design, including Russian Constructivism. More recent works have included oil paintings and drawings.

== Education ==
Afrassiabi studied for an MA in Fine Art at Goldsmiths College, graduating in 1997. He set up The Trade Apartment with architect Raymond Brinkman in 1998, and held his first solo show, 'You're a Heavenly Thing' in 2000.

== Career ==
In 2001 he was one of ten artists selected for the Institute of Contemporary Arts' Beck's Futures Arts award for his mixed media work 'Jalousie Gelocht als Blend Schultz' which is now in the permanent collection of Leeds Art Gallery.

== Exhibitions ==
His work has featured in a number of international exhibitions, examples including:

- 1998 - 'Surfacing' - Institute of Contemporary Arts.
- 2000 - 'These Epic Islands' - Vilma Gold gallery, London.
- 2002 - 'Early One Morning (new Generation) Whitechapel Gallery, London.
- 2004 - Project Art Centre Dublin.
- 2004 - 'Piet x 4 2004' - a new work commissioned for the EXPO21: Strategies of Display, touring exhibition, Warwick Arts Centre
- 2010 - 'Subject to Form', Limoncello Gallery, London.
- 2018 - Paintings 2016–2018 exhibition, Soy Capitán gallery, Berlin.

== Publications ==
- 1999 - 'REVIEW: DJ Simpson' in Flash art magazine
- 2000 - 'John Chilver' in Flash art magazine
- 2002 - Early One Morning: British Art Now.
