= Cabaret Voltaire (magazine) =

Dada magazine in Zürich, Switzerland (1916)

- Categories: Art magazine
- Founder: Hugo Ball
- Founded: 1916
- First issue: 31 May 1916
- Final issue: 31 May 1916
- Country: Switzerland
- Based in: Zürich
- Language: German; French

Cabaret Voltaire was a one-issue Dadaist art magazine which was published in May 1916 in Zürich, Switzerland. Its subtitle was eine Sammlung künstlerischer und literarischer Beiträge (German: A collection of artistic and literary contributions).

== History and profile ==
Cabaret Voltaire was launched by the German writer Hugo Ball in Zürich and appeared on 31 May 1916. In the magazine Hugo Ball announced the opening of an artistic nightclub with the same name, Cabaret Voltaire. The publisher of the magazine was Julius Heuberger. Its size was 21.5 x 27 cm (8½ x 10½ inches), and it had thirty-two pages. Five hundred copies of the magazine were issued.

Cabaret Voltaire published articles in French and German. Its format was conventional, and the magazine featured work by the Dadaist, Futurist and Cubist artists.

The successor of Cabaret Voltaire was Dada, an art and literary review launched by Tristan Tzara.
