= Mark Divo =

Swiss-luxembourgish conceptual artist and curator

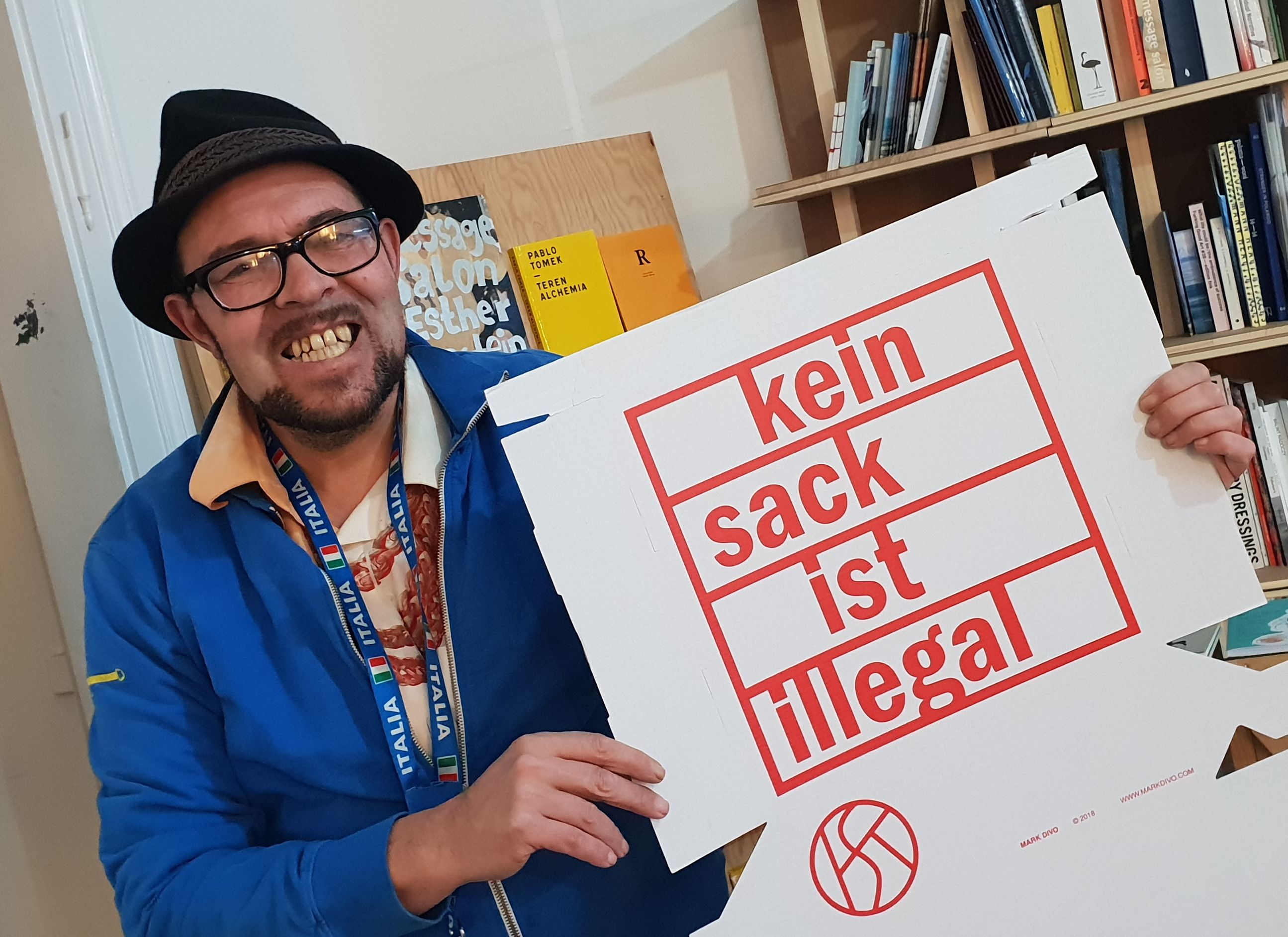
- Mark Divo in 2018
- Born: 1966 (age 59–60); Zürich, Switzerland
- Known for: inhabited sculpture
- Movement: conceptual art

Mark Divo (born 1966) is a Swiss-Luxembourgian conceptual artist and curator. He organizes large-scale interactive art projects incorporating the work of underground artists. His work involves painting, performance, photography, sculpture and installation.

== Early life ==
Divo was born in 1966. From 1987 to 1989 he studied social sciences in Göttingen. He had his first self-organized exhibition in 1988. In 1989 he dropped out of his studies and moved to Berlin.

== Career ==
Between 1988 and 1989 Divo worked in West Berlin. After the fall of the Berlin Wall in 1989, he moved to East Berlin, where he organized exhibitions at the Kunst Haus Tacheles. Between 1990 and 1994 he organized exhibitions, performances, and murals with the Duncker group.

In 1994 he moved back to Zürich where he created a number of murals and organised a group of travelling mural painters. There he organised several underground art projects funded by the Swiss government, including exhibitions/events in the subways of Escherwyssplatz. In 1995, he organised a festival of underground art. Amongst the artists who exhibited were Swiss artist Ingo Giezendanner, German artist Leumund Cult and British artist Lennie Lee.

In the winter of 2002, he occupied the Cabaret Voltaire with different artists including Dan Jones. Together they succeeded in preventing the location's closure. The building has now been turned into a museum dedicated to Dada (Cabaret Voltaire). In 2003 he organised a Dada festival at the Sihlpapierfabrik.

In 2004, Divo was awarded a one year art residency at the Swiss Institute Contemporary Art New York in West Broadway, New York, where he invited artists to exhibit alongside him. In the summer of 2008, he established the Divo Institute, a multi-disciplinary arts center in the city of Kolín, near Prague. In August 2009, Divo was one of thirty artist-curators who presented work by artists from the Divo Institute at the Subvision Art Festival in Hamburg.

Since becoming an artist, Divo has exhibited in museums throughout Europe including the Helmhaus, Zürich, the Contemporary Art Center, Vilnius, the Kunsthaus Zürich and the Kinský Palace, Prague. He has created three public sculptures for the city of Zürich.

Since 2002, working in collaboration with artists, performers and photographers, Divo has produced a series of large-format satirical photographs.
