= Bergpartei, die ÜberPartei =

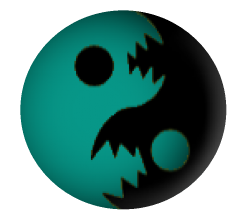
- Chairperson: Yanachasca Laso Solari
- General Secretary: Jan Theiler
- Founded: July 2005 (Both), 1 April 2011 (Merger)
- Merger of: Bergpartei; ÜberPartei
- Headquarters: Berlin
- Ideology: Post-left anarchy Green anarchism Dadaism; Autonomism
- Political position: Left-wing
- Colours: Green-black (flag)
- Slogan: Small but slow

Party flag

Website
- www.bergpartei.de

Bergpartei, die ÜberPartei, stylized as bergpartei, die überpartei (German pronunciation: [ˌbɛʁkpaʁˈtaɪ diː ˌʔyːbɐpaʁˈtaɪ]) and shortened as B*, is a left-wing anarchist, dadaist party in Germany. Its main proposals include universal basic income, restricting private ownership and leaving NATO.

It is known for the holding of a vegetable battle between two rival districts of Berlin and the video activist film festival nodogma.

== History ==
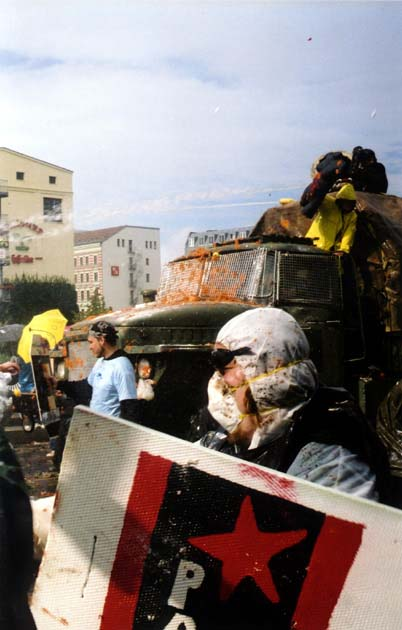
Separatist water cannon at the vegetable battle.

It was founded on 1 April 2011 by fusing two grassroot squatter parties, the Bergpartei and the ÜberPartei.

The party's founding chairman was Jan Theiler, who currently serves as the party's general secretary. He was succeeded as the party leader by Rico Tscharntke who served the position until 2021, when he was replaced by Yanachasca Laso Solari.

== Program ==
B* has no domination claim, but refuses to be a joke party. Its additional designation is: radical feminist arm, utopian solidarity branch, post-identity anti-national, anti-materialist action.

The party is considered left-wing and has roots in the Berlin squatter scene. It supports a system of unconditional, universal basic income, proposes strict restrictions on private ownership, advocates leaving NATO and seeks to implement a system that would let the people directly exercise political power through direct democracy and anarchism.

In 2005, the Bergpartei was the first German party to enshrine the unconditional basic income, then called existence money, in its program.

== Electoral Results ==
In the Berlin elections 2011, the party gained 0.9 % in the district Friedrichshain-Kreuzberg (including 3.2% in the former squats area "Wahlkreis 5"). In the national elections 2013, the party gained 0.4% in the same district. Berlin 2016: 3,1 % in area Wahlkreis 5 and 0,5 % in the whole district of Friedrichshain-Kreuzberg. 2021 elections were held in Berlin and the federal level at the same time. Bergpartei decided to support the referendum to expropriate landlords and doubled their votes.

== Posters and slogans ==
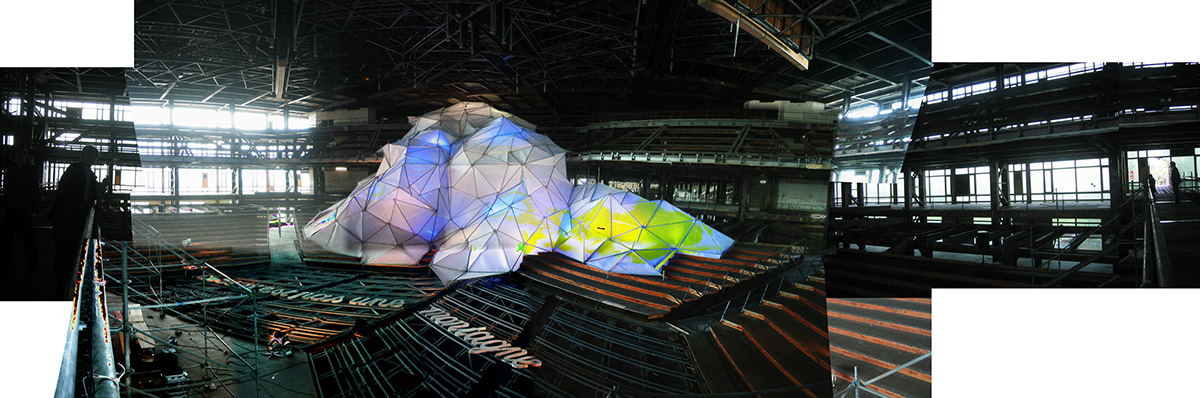
founding place: installation "the Mountain", inside Palace of the Republic 2005

The party is famous for its handmade posters and billboards.

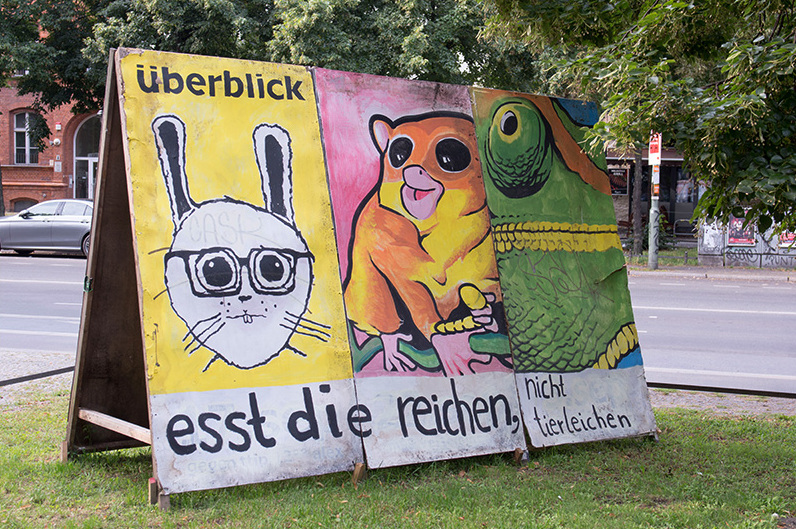
Eat the rich, not animal cadavers

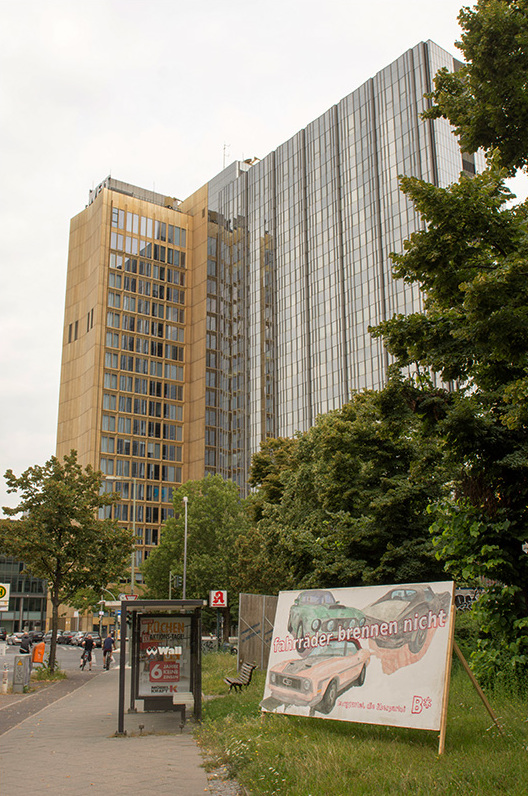
Bikes don't burn

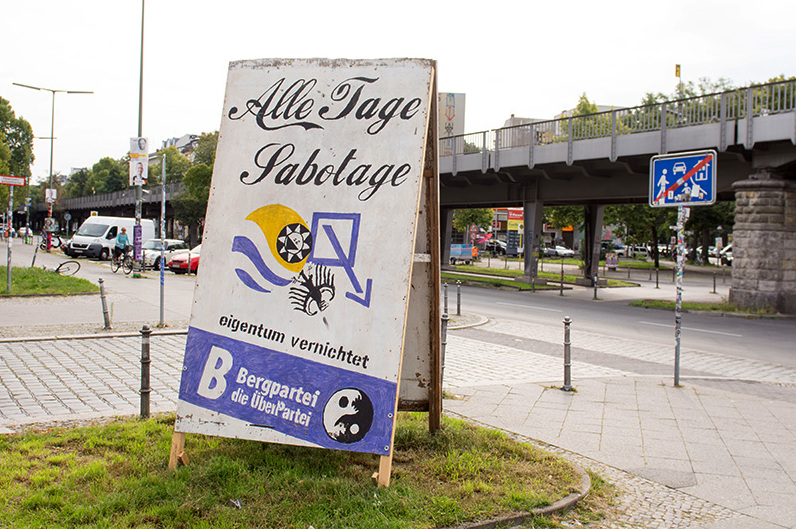
Every day sabotage day

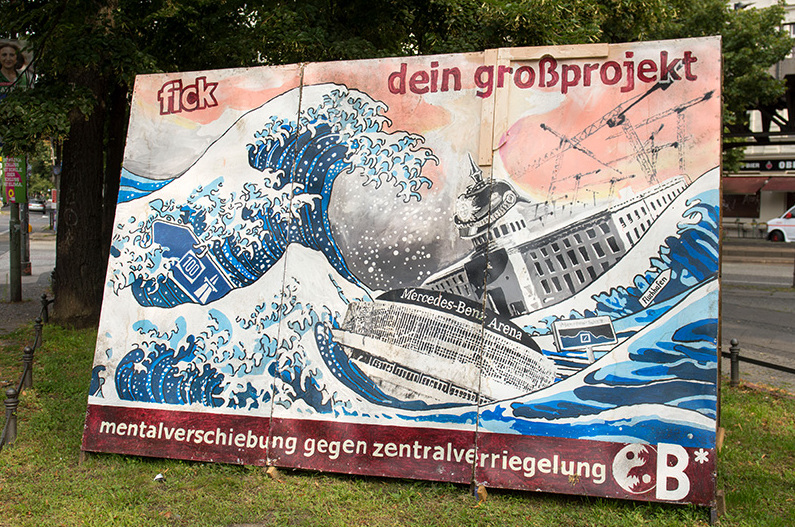
Fuck your major projects

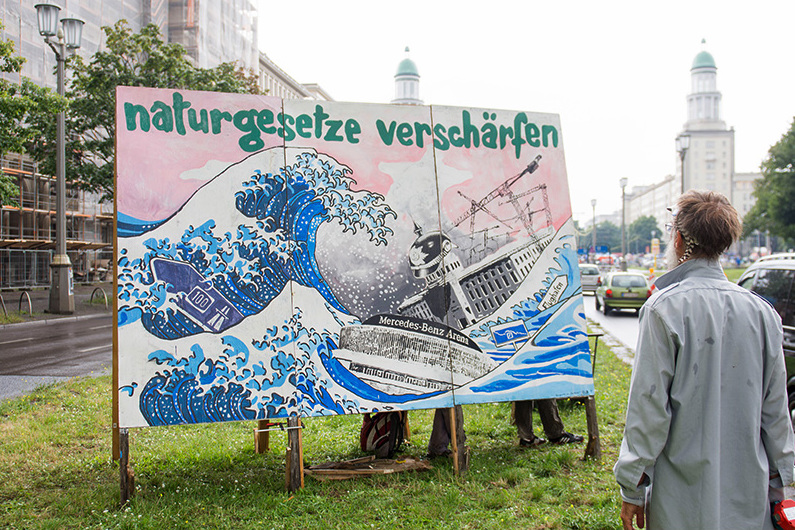
Toughen the laws of nature

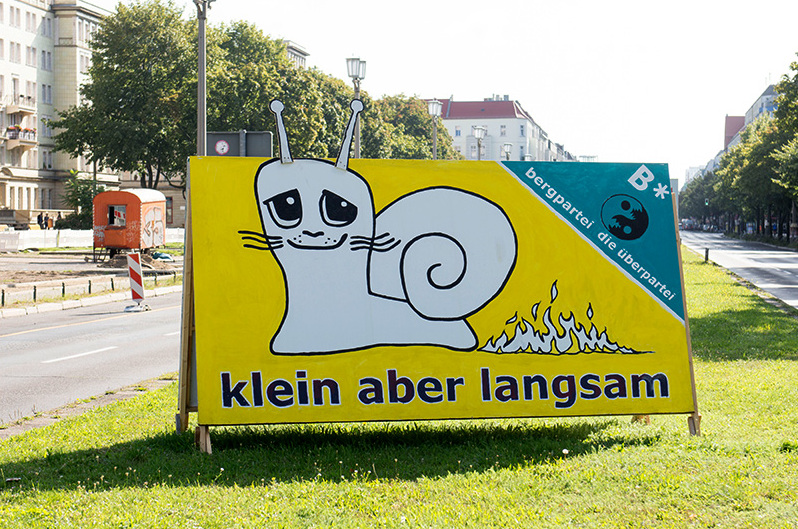
Small but slow

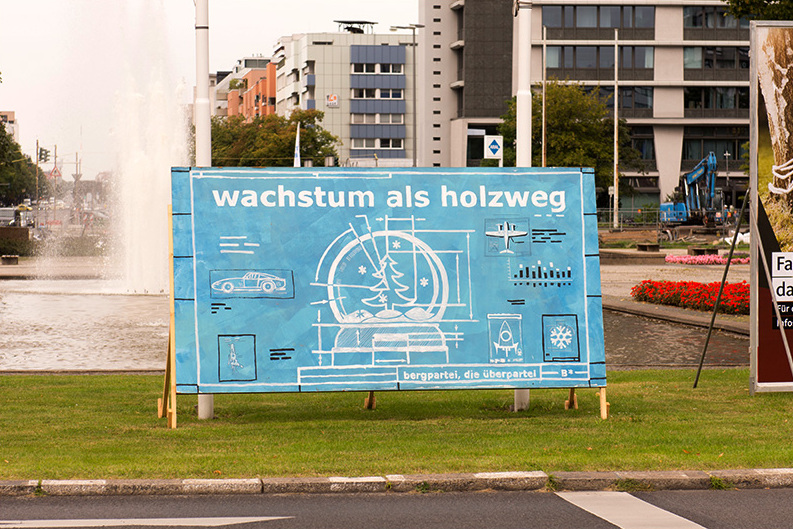
Growth is a pitfall

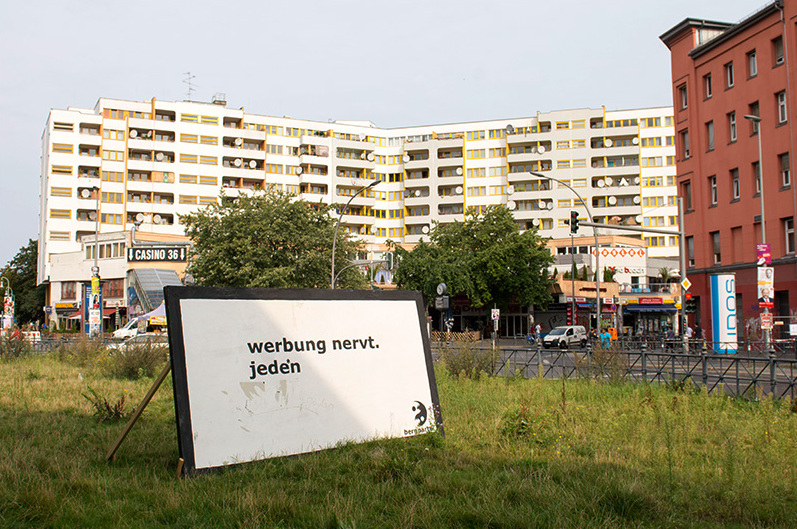
Ads annoy everyone

== See also ==
- Dadaism
- Green anarchism
- List of political parties in Germany

== Webpages ==
- Official website
