= Dada Manifesto =

1916 artistic movement text by Hugo Ball

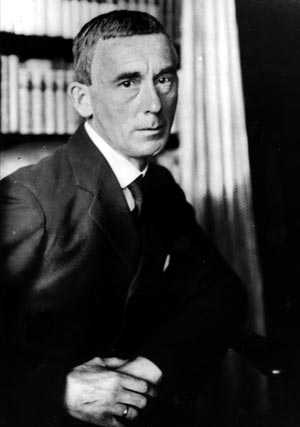
Portrait of the poet and essayist Hugo Ball

The Dada Manifesto (French: Le Manifeste DaDa) is a short text written by Hugo Ball detailing the ideals underlying the Dadaist movement. It was presented at Zur Waag guildhall in Zürich at the first public Dada gathering on July 14, 1916. The choice of this date, Bastille Day, was important to Ball as it carried significance as a protest to World War I. In this manifesto, Ball begins by giving diverse definitions of the word "Dada" in multiple languages. He continues to introduce the movement's own definition of "Dada" by boldly asserting that "Dada is the heart of words." Ball concludes his manifesto with a linguistic explosion that alternates between coherence and absurdity. After writing his manifesto Ball stayed active in the Dada movement for another six months, but the manifesto created conflict with his fellow Dada artists, most notably Tristan Tzara.

== Tzara's response ==
On March 23, 1918, Tzara wrote and published another, longer, Manifeste Dada 1918. This manifesto was angrier and more nonsensical in tone. Tzara counters Ball's earlier manifesto and states that all definitions of "Dada" were to be dismissed immediately. Tzara's Manifeste was used in the prologue and in the segment about Dadaism of the 2015 film Manifesto.
