= Ingo Giezendanner =

Swiss artist

Ingo Giezendanner (born 1975) is a Swiss painter and installation artist. He is a member of the Kroesos Foundation. He lives and works in Zürich, Switzerland.

== Publications ==
- GRR5: Seattle / San Francisco (1999), Andreas Züst Verlag, 104 pages ISBN 3-905328-05-4
- GRR8: Zürich (2002) Edition Patrick Frey, 72 pages ISBN 3-905509-42-3 Out of print.
- GRR20: Die Bau Zeitung (2004) edition fink, 40 pages ISBN 3-906086-69-0
- GRR23: DESIGN (2004) Nieves Books, 12 pages Out of print.
- GRR30: urban recordings (2006) passenger books, 356 pages ISBN 978-3-00-018496-3
