= Lennie Lee =

South African conceptual artist (born 1958)

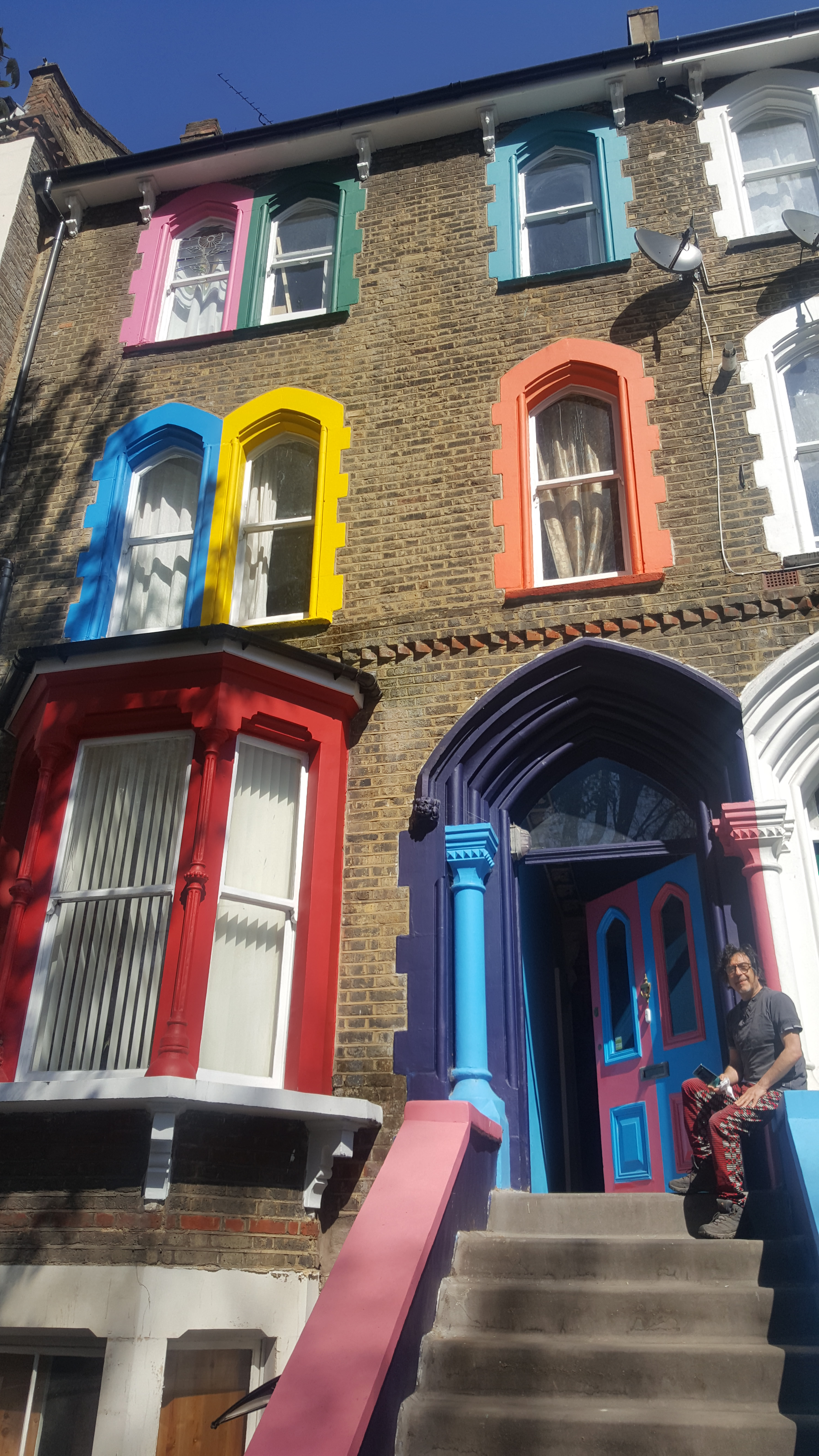
- Lennie Lee outside his home in Dalston
- Born: 4 March 1958 (age 68); Johannesburg, South Africa
- Education: Christ Church, Oxford
- Known for: painting, performance art, video art, photography and installation art
- Patrons: David Roberts
- Website: www.lennielee.co.uk

Lennie Lee (born 4 March 1958) is a South African conceptual artist who lives and works in London.

== Life and career ==
Lee is a South African artist born in Johannesburg, South Africa. He moved to the UK in 1960. He was educated at Dulwich College in London before winning a scholarship to study philosophy at Christ Church, Oxford.

In 1983, he took up painting. Soon after, he moved to East London where he became interested in the urban dereliction left over from the Second World War. In 1984 he occupied several disused buildings and, together with a number of artists including South African painter, Beezy Bailey, he began to make site-specific installations using found material.

From the mid-1980s he joined various underground art collectives including the ARC group, a London-based collective of international artists, influenced by Kurt Schwitters, who specialized in building site-specific installation art. From 1987 to 1991, he worked together with the ARC group until it was finally disbanded in November 1991 in Budapest.

After the Berlin Wall came down in 1989, Lee was offered a number of exhibitions in East and West Berlin. While working on a series of outdoor sculptural installations in the summer of 1990, he was invited to work at the Kunst Haus Tacheles in Berlin, where he made contact with the thriving Berlin underground scene. On his return to London in the winter of 1990 he began to make a series of performances, mostly on the theme of taboo, the first of which took place at the ARC in London's Balls Pond Road. Through this, Lee was introduced to members of the KULE group, a radical theatre collective based in Berlin who invited him to come and stay in August Strasse 10 in the winter of 1990. There, together with performance artist Nils Duemcke, he set up a weekly cabaret. In the same year he painted large-scale banners for the Mutoid Waste Company.

After returning to London, he set up a new art collective known as the 'Department of Hate and Social Sickness', (DHSS) in spring 1992. The DHSS continued to make installations and performances in underground venues throughout London until it was disbanded in the spring of 1994. That same year, in collaboration with Ian Stenhouse and Mark Bishop, Lee set up the Rich and famous gallery in the heart of London's East End showing work by a number of artists including Martin Maloney, David Burrows, Mark Divo, Ingo Giezendanner, Graham Nicholls, Dan Jones, Tod Hanson, Lee Campbell, Daniel Fernandez, David Mccairley Ian Stenhouse, Gini Simpson, Trevor Knaggs and Stefanie Maas.

In winter 1994, Lee once again moved to Berlin where he organised a series of performances in the theatre space at the Kunst Haus Tacheles in Berlin. There he became involved with a group of radical artists from Zürich including Mark Divo and Ingo Giezendanner and from 1995 onwards was repeatedly invited by them to take part in a series of art projects throughout Europe including Divo's important show at the 'Escherwyssplatz' in Zürich in 1995, the infamous Cabaret Voltaire in 2002, the 'Sihlpapierfabrik', Zürich in 2003 and the 'Real Biennale', Prague in 2005 and 'Process', Prague in 2006.

In the late 1990s Lee made a series of performances and installations for the art collective, Hydra. Between 1996 and 2002 Lee worked together with Gustavo Aguerre and Ingrid Falk, mainly in Sweden.

In 2003 Lee was invited by Gillian McIver to join 'Luna Nera', an art collective producing site-specific installations.

Since 2000 Lee has concentrated mainly on performance art, video art, digital photography and installation art. He has exhibited in a number of UK institutions including the Barbican Art Centre, the Institute of Contemporary Arts, Tate gallery and the Third Eye Centre in Glasgow. Abroad he has exhibited in the National Gallery in Stockholm 1998, the Museum of Arts and Sciences in Valencia, 2005, the Circulo de Bellas Artes, Madrid, 2006 and the prestigious Venice Biennale in 1999. He was the subject of documentaries. He was included in an Imax film directed by "Faust" singer and painter Geraldine Swayne. Since 2001, Lee has made a series of performances and exhibitions in Chengdu, Xi'an and Beijing organised by the curator Shu Yang.

In 2020 he exhibited in Covent Gardens Our Wonderful Culture alongside Stan Lewry

Lee is a painter and performance artist working with themes of taboo,shame and fear. His work involves extreme performance, video and digital images
