= Cabaret Voltaire (Zurich) =

Nightclub in Switzerland; birthplace of the Dada art movement

Coordinates: 47°22′18″N 8°32′38″E

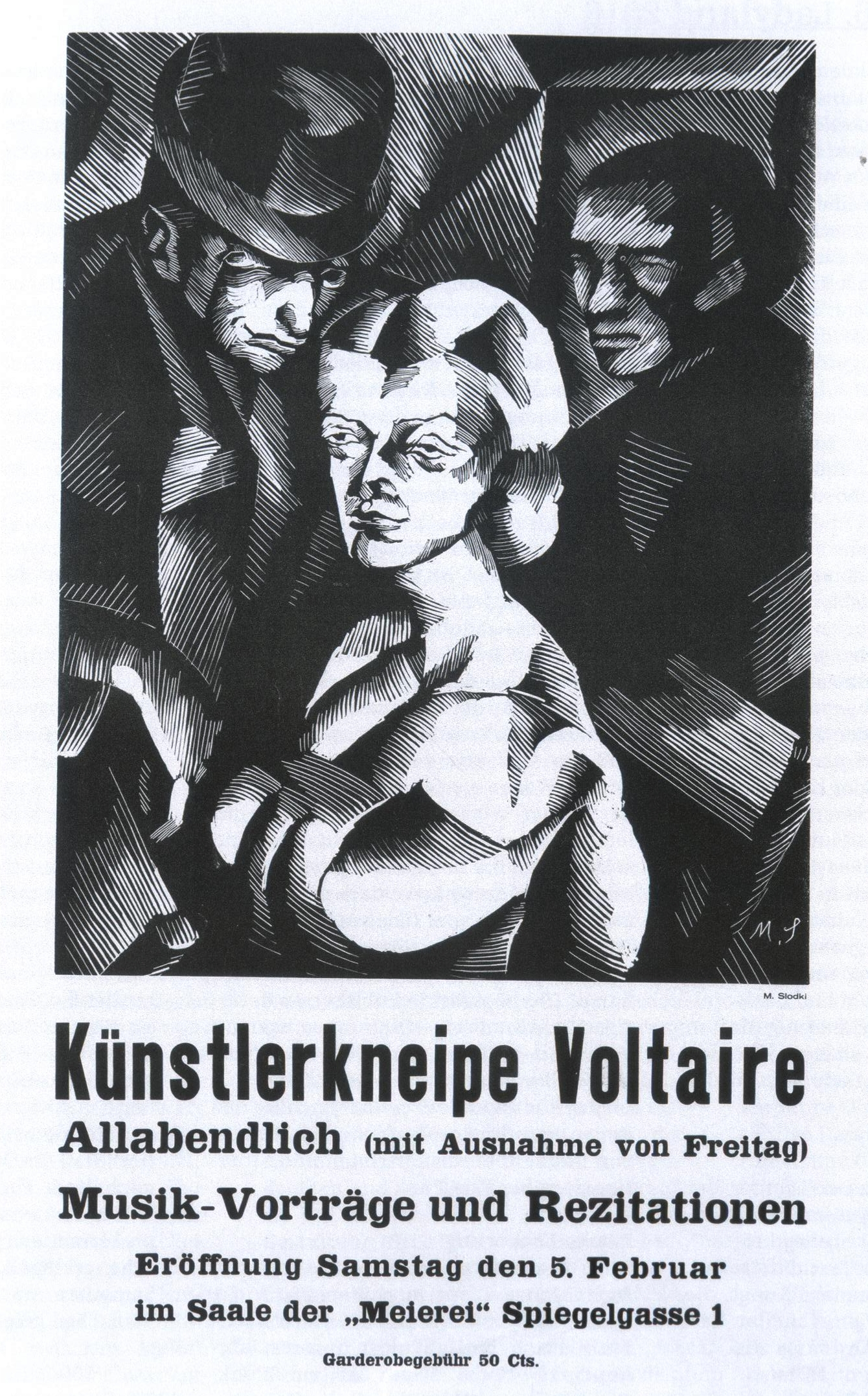
Poster for the opening of the Cabaret Voltaire on 5 February 1916. Lithograph by Marcel Slodki.

Cabaret Voltaire is the birthplace of the Dada art movement, founded in Zurich, Switzerland, in 1916. It was founded by Hugo Ball and Emmy Hennings as a cabaret intended for artistic and political purposes.

Other founding members were Marcel Janco, Richard Huelsenbeck, Tristan Tzara, Sophie Taeuber-Arp and Jean Arp.

It is currently operating as a museum, bar and cultural space open to the public, at Spiegelgasse 1 in Zurich, Switzerland.

== Significance ==
The cabaret was founded at the Holländische Meierei, Spiegelgasse 1, in Zurich, Switzerland on February 5, 1916. Vladimir Lenin moved into a flat at Spiegelgasse 14, a few houses up the same street, on 21 February 1916, sixteen days after the cabaret opened, and remained there until his departure for Russia on 2 April 1917.. The cabaret proved pivotal in the founding of the anarchic art movement known as Dada.

"If one seeks a dictionary now to explain the word 'Dada,' one will discover it has a clear definition. Yet, no one can describe exactly that feeling of rebellion, hidden behind suspicion and the desire to do what the troupe was passionate about at the time."

In 2013, the Cabaret Voltaire performances were ranked as the 25th best work of performance art in history.

Cabaret Voltaire closed in the summer of 1916, but the Cabaret was revived in the same building in the 21st century.

== History ==
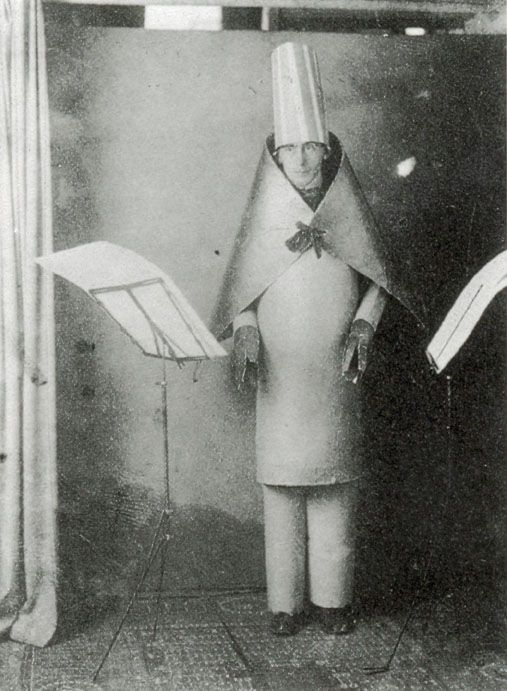
Hugo Ball performing at Cabaret Voltaire in 1916

Switzerland was a neutral country during World War I and among the many refugees coming to Zurich were artists from all over Europe. Ball and Hennings approached Ephraim Jan, patron of the Holländische Meierei at Spiegelgasse 1, which had already hosted Zurich's first literary cabaret, the Pantagruel in 1915. Jan permitted them to use the back room for events. The press release on 2 February 1916 announcing the opening of the club reads:

The Cabaret Voltaire. Under this name a group of young artists and writers has formed with the object of becoming a center for artistic entertainment. In principle, the Cabaret will be run by artists, permanent guests, who, following their daily reunions, will give musical or literary performances. Young Zurich artists, of all tendencies, are invited to join us with suggestions and proposals.

The cabaret featured spoken word, dance and music. The soirees were often raucous events with artists experimenting with new forms of performance, such as sound poetry and simultaneous poetry. Mirroring the maelstrom of World War I raging around it, the art it exhibited was often chaotic and brutal. On at least one occasion, the audience attacked the cabaret's stage. Though the cabaret was to be the birthplace of the Dadaist movement, it featured artists from every sector of the avant-garde, including Futurism's Marinetti. The cabaret exhibited radically experimental artists, many of whom went on to change the face of their artistic disciplines; featured artists included Wassily Kandinsky, Paul Klee, Giorgio de Chirico, Sophie Taeuber-Arp, and Max Ernst.

On 28 July 1916, Ball read out his Dada Manifesto. In June, Ball had also published a journal with the same name. It featured work from artists such as the poet Guillaume Apollinaire, and had a cover designed by Arp.

The cabaret closed in the summer of 1916.

While the Dada movement was just beginning, by 1917 the excitement generated by Cabaret Voltaire had fizzled out, and the artists moved on to other places in Zurich such as the Galerie Dada at Bahnhofstrasse 19, and later Paris and Berlin.

=== 21st century revival ===
After the turn of the millennium, the building which had housed Cabaret Voltaire in 1916 had fallen into disrepair, and in the winter of 2001/2002 a group of artists describing themselves as neo-Dadaists, organised by Mark Divo, squatted the building to protest its planned closure. They declared that it was a signal for a new generation of artists to align themselves with a revival of Dada.

Over a period of three months there was a number of performances, parties, poetry evenings and film nights. Among the participating artists were Ingo Giezendanner, Lennie Lee, Leumund Cult, Mickry3, xeno volcano, elektra sturmschnell, Aiana Calugar, and Dan Jones. The building was decorated on the outside as well as the inside. Thousands of people from around Zurich took part in the experiment. On April 2, 2002 police evicted the occupants.

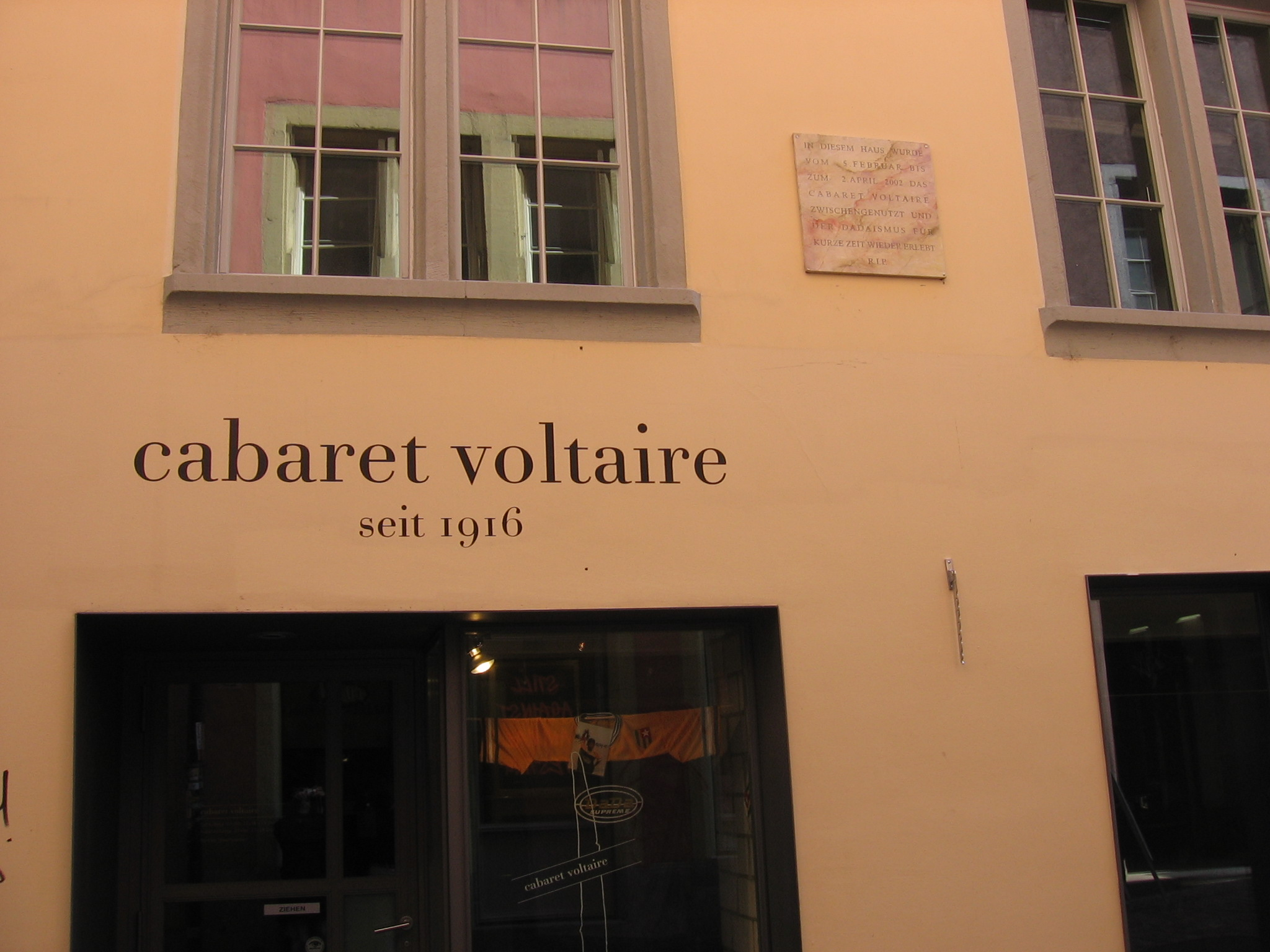
Entrance to the new Cabaret Voltaire

The cabaret reopened in 2004 under the direction of Philipp Meier, with Adrian Notz joining as his deputy and later co-director. Notz became sole director in 2012 and continued in that role until the end of 2019. Salome Hohl has been director since 2020. The institution's continued public funding has been politically contested. The City of Zurich pays the rent for the premises through a multi-year subsidy that requires periodic parliamentary renewal. In 2008 the Swiss People's Party launched a referendum against the city parliament's decision to extend the subsidy until 2011 at 315,000 Swiss francs per year, with a referendum committee operating under the slogan «Zürich ist nicht gaga: Keine Steuergelder für Dada!» ("Zurich is not gaga: no taxpayers' money for Dada!"). In the city-wide vote on 28 September 2008, voters clearly rejected the referendum and approved the continued subsidy. A new cabaret has since opened in the building, with an extensive programme of events such as, Hugo Ball: Fuga saeculi, in 2008, curated by Bazon Brock and included a performance of Gabriella Daris's corporeal poem LopLop: WORD or WOman biRD (an homage to Max Ernst's namesake collage from 1921) as well as a film projection by Werner Nekes.

More recently, Cabaret Voltaire has adopted personalities and celebrated them as Dadaists, such as Alexander Archipenko, Tatsuo Okada and Mikhail Bakunin. Cabaret Voltaire sponsored the restoration of Bakunin's grave plate in the Bremgarten cemetery in Bern, adding a portrait by Swiss artist Daniel Garbade and the Bakunin quote: "By striving to do the impossible, man has always achieved what is possible."

== In popular culture ==
- The electronic band Cabaret Voltaire was named as so in reference to the club, drawing inspiration from Dadaism and incorporating it in their earliest albums.
- The novel What was Beautiful and Good by Jill Blocker follows the lives of Emmy Hennings and Hugo Ball during the early days of World War 1, Here, they struggle to find purpose amidst the chaos, which results in the creation of the Cabaret Voltaire.
- In 2012, the Blue Devils Drum and Bugle Corps won their 15th Drum Corps International World Championship, with a score of 98.7 for their show, entitled "Caberet Voltaire".
- In 2020, the first season of the television show The Fugitive Game, which focusses on German poet Emmy Hennings, was filmed on location at Cabaret Voltaire.
- Talan Memmott's electronic literature work, (2001, Flash) The Hugo Ball interprets Hugo Ball's "Gadji beri bimba" as users mouse over Hugo Ball's face, the words of the poem are recited in a randomized order
