= Nicola Pellegrini =

Italian artist

Nicola Pellegrini (born Milan, Italy, 1962) is an artist, curator, and architect; a conceptual artist working with photography, installation and video.

Pellegrini is a former member of the London-based art collective ARC group. In 1988 he and other ARC members lived and worked in a large art house in the Highgate area, known as Chumley Dene. Later he took part in building large-scale installations in London, Milan, Genoa and Budapest until the group fell apart in the autumn of 1991. In 2001 he curated a show for the Oreste room in the Italian Pavilion at the Venice Biennale.

Pellegrini also took part in a number of exhibitions in museums and private galleries, including "Contagious" at the Malmö Museum in 1996, the 8th International Photography Biennial in 1999 and the 3rd Tirana Biennale in 2003. He has had several exhibitions at Galleria Milano in Italy.
