= ID Festival Berlin =

ID Festival Berlin (German: Israel-Deutschland Festival Berlin) is an arts festival that aims to present the works of the Israeli artists living in Germany. The first edition of the festival took place in October 2015 at Radialsystem V.

== History ==
Founded by the Israeli pianist and composer Ohad Ben-Ari, the festival's name takes after the English acronym for the Identity document, which also happen to be the first letters in Israel and Deutschland (Germany in German). Upon coming to Germany, Ben-Ari saw the multitude of Israeli classical musicians living there, specifically in Berlin, and he envisioned a symphonic orchestra made of only Israeli musicians. After talking to the member of the German Bundestag Rüdiger Kruse of the Christlich Demokratische Union Deutschlands party, Ben-Ari's original idea grew into a 3-day event featuring not just the Israeli classical musicians, but also Israelis from other art disciplines such as visual art, dance, theater, and film. Eventually, the festival gained its financial support from the German ministry of culture.

== Festival Programme ==
ID Festival aims to represent the German-based Israeli artists from different art disciplines. Typically visual art, dance, theater, film, music, and literature find their way into the programme. Additionally, philosophical discussions on topics pertaining to that year's theme are featured.

In 2015, renowned musicians such as violinist Guy Braunstein, mandolinist Avi Avital, and piano duet Silver-Garburg partook in the festival. Additionally, theater playwright Hila Golan, with the actors Ariel Nil Levy and Niva Dloomy presented their play "Save Your Love - Part 1", while Sivan Ben-Yishai put together a piece commissioned specifically for the festival "I Know I'm Ugly But I Glitter in the Dark". Dance company matanicola together with the progressive wave presented their dance performance "BodieSlanGuage". Two films were screened at the festival: Farewell Herr Schwarz by Yael Reuveny and "I Hear The Synths of East Berlin" by Micki Weinberg. Finally, visual artist's groups Circle1 and Die Asporas exhibited at the festival.

In 2016, the festival saw participating a very diverse and multidisciplinary group of Israeli artists living in Berlin: filmmaker Udi Aloni with his Junction 48 film crew, violinist Guy Braunstein, classical Trio Mondrian, baroque ensemble Sferraina, Omer Klein jazz Trio, Tango Factory, The Third Generation Cabaret, playwright and filmmaker Micki Weinberg, performance artist the Progressive Wave, dancers and choreographers Oren Lazovski and Nir de Volff/Total Brutal, as well as artists of the Circle1 Platform for the Arts.

In the 2017, ID Festival Berlin brings the Israeli national Habima Theatre with its award-winning play "Jeder Stirbt für Sich Allein" (lit: Every Man Dies Alone or Alone in Berlin), based on the novel of the same name by Hans Fallada. In addition, a series of classical concerts with prominent Israeli and German musicians will take place as a part of the festival's 2017 theme "integration?".

== Festival Themes ==
ID Festival has a specific theme each year to tie various art events together. In 2015, festival's theme was identity, as reflected in that year's motto: "Searching for new paths to German-Israeli identity". In 2016, reflecting on the then current issue of the refugees in Germany, the festival's topic was migration, with the motto being "Migration told through Israeli-German art". Building on the previous years of work, the 2017 theme is "integration?", where the ID Festival continues to encourage collaborations between Israeli and German artists, organizations, and institutions, providing further opportunities for Israeli artists to integrate into the German cultural landscape.

== Israeli Artists in Berlin ==
As of 2015, there were estimated over 11,000 Israelis living in Berlin. Many of them are speculated to be artists, academics, and cosmopolitan, who are described as young, liberal, well-educated, and secular. Some of the reasons why Berlin attracts many Israelis may be low costs of living and an overall appealing image of the city.

== See also ==
Berlin International Film Festival

Berlin International Literature Festival
