= Sasha Waltz =

German Choreographer and Dancer

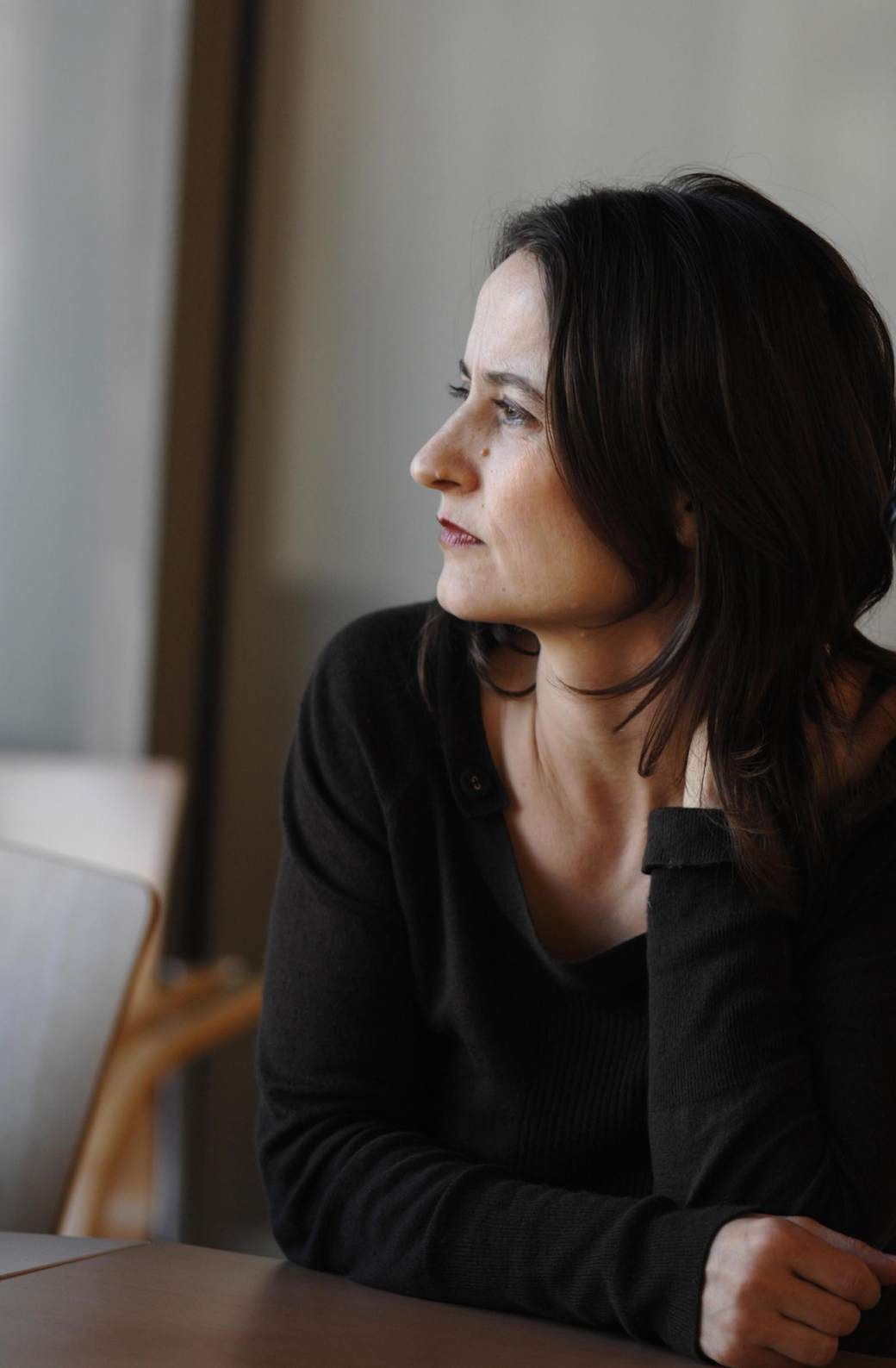
Sasha Waltz (2007)

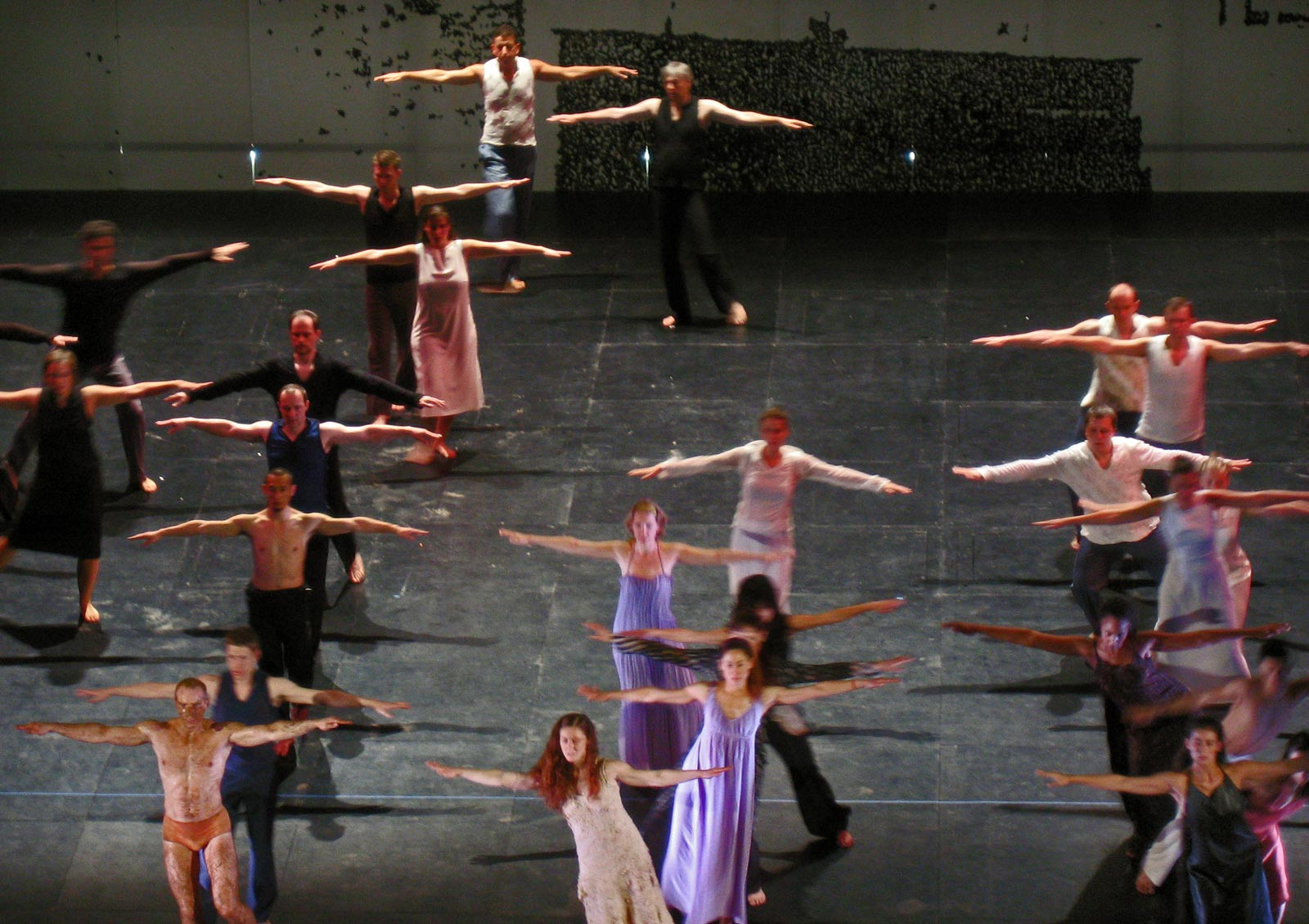
Sasha Waltz

Sasha Alexandra Waltz (born 8 March 1963, Karlsruhe) is a German choreographer, dancer and leader of the dance company Sasha Waltz and Guests.

== Biography ==
Waltz is the daughter of an architect and a curator. At the age of five years she had her first dance lesson in Karlsruhe with Waltraud Kornhass, a student of Mary Wigman. From 1983 until 1986, Waltz studied at the School For New Dance Development in Amsterdam.

Between 1986 and 1987, Waltz did further training in New York. During that period she was a dancer for Pooh Kaye, Yoshiko Chuma & School of Hard Knocks, and Lisa Kraus. After that, she collaborated intensely with choreographers, visual artists and musicians such as Tristan Honsinger, Frans Poelstra, Mark N Tompkins, and David Zambrano.

From 1992 onwards Waltz was an artist in residence at the Künstlerhaus Bethanien. There she developed a series of "dialogues" in interdisciplinary projects with dancers, musicians and visual artists (Nasser Martin-Gousset, Takako Suzuki, Charlotte Zerbey, Ákos Hargitai). A year later in 1993, she founded her company "Sasha Waltz and Guests" with Jochen Sandig. Over the next 3 years they developed the Travelogue-Trilogy.

Together with Jochen Sandig, Waltz founded the Sophiensæle in central Berlin, as a center for the development of free theatre and dance. Here they developed Allee der Kosmonauten (1996), Zweiland (1997) and Na Zemlje (1998), as well as the project Dialoge `99/I.

In 1999, Waltz took over as artistic director at Schaubühne am Lehniner Platz in Berlin alongside Thomas Ostermeier, Jens Hillje and Jochen Sandig. She opened the Schaubühne under new direction with the debut of Körper (2000). This was followed by S (2000), noBody (2002), insideout (2003), Impromptus (2004) and Gezeiten (2005).

Once her 5-year period with the Schaubühne finished, Waltz reactivated Sasha Waltz & Guests as an independent company again, with a base in Berlin. It was established as an international project with 25 permanent and 40 associate collaborators.

In 2008, she was awarded the X Europe Prize Theatrical Realities, in Thessaloniki.

In 2016, Michael Mueller, Mayor of Berlin, announced that Waltz and Johannes Ohman would succeed Nacho Duato as joint artistic directors of the Berlin State Ballet in 2019.

In an online conversation with Octavian Saiu, Waltz declared that she "does not want to go back to the same world" as before the pandemic. She further explained that she thinks important lessons should be drawn from the global crisis, with crucial implications for humanity, ecology, and culture.

In July 2022, Sasha Waltz became the Inaugural Fellow of the International Association of Theatre Leaders (IATL).

Waltz and her husband Jochen Sandig have two children.

== Artistic phases ==
=== Education ===
After high school, from 1983 to 1986, Waltz studied dance at the School For New Dance Development in Amsterdam.

She then furthered her education in New York from 1986 to 1987. In New York she worked as a dancer in the companies of Pooh Kaye, Yoshiko Chuma & School of Hard Knocks and Lisa Kraus. She then went on to collaborate with choreographers, visual artists and musicians such as Tristan Honsinger, Frans Poelstra, Mark Tompkins, David Zambrano, and others.

During her training in Amsterdam and New York she created her first Sasha Waltz's choreographies, among them: Das Meer in mir (1985), Gold Dust (1986), How come we go (1987), Schwarze Sirene (1987) and Rifle (1987).

=== 1990s ===
In 1992, Waltz received a scholarship from the Künstlerhaus Bethanien in Berlin as an Artist-in-residence It was in that context that she created her first of five dialogues in collaboration with the dancers Frans Poelstra, Nasser Martin-Gousset, Takako Suzuki, Kitt Johnson, Carme Renalias and David Zambrano, as well as the musicians Tristan Honsinger, David Moss, Dietmar Diesner, Sven-Åke Johansson, and Peter Hollinger. They performed their own dance productions at various locations in Berlin, such as the two solos False Trap (Tanzfabrik Berlin, 1991) and Paulinchen – allein zu Haus (Kunsthaus Tacheles, 1996) and in 1993 the Duet Bungalow in Hackescher Markt.

Over the next three years her career took off with productions including Travelogue-Trilogie with Twenty to Eight (1993), Tears Breakfast (1994) and All Ways Six Steps (1995). Through this work, she laid the foundation for the rest of her career: After the premiere of Twenty to Eight in October 1993, Waltz founded, together with Jochen Sandig, her own dance company Sasha Waltz & Guests in order to appear in the Dance Platform in Berlin in 1994. The Dance Platform brought her more public attention. Then, Sasha Waltz & Guests toured with the trilogy Travelogue through Europe, and in 1995, with the support of the Goethe Institute, she toured North America (including the cities of Atlanta, New York, Chicago, Montreal, Houston and Los Angeles).

=== 2000s ===
In 2007 a new generation of dancers took part in the first play of the trilogy Twenty to Eight. Up to this date the play is still on the repertoire of the company and is regularly performed.

== Selected works ==
Year and location of world premieres by Sasha Waltz:

- 1993 Travelogue I – Twenty To Eight, Grand Theatre Groningen
- 1994 Travelogue II – Tears Break Fast, Podewil Berlin
- 1995 Travelogue III – All Ways Six Steps, Theater am Halleschen Ufer Berlin
- 1996 Allee der Kosmonauten, Sophiensaele Berlin
- 1997 Zweiland, Sophiensaele Berlin – 48th Berliner Festspiele
- 1998 Na Zemlje ("On Earth"), Sophiensaele Berlin
- 1998 Film adaptation of Allee der Kosmonauten in cooperation with television channels Arte/ZDF directed by Sasha Waltz
- 1999 Dialoge '99/I, Sophiensaele Berlin
- 1999 Dialoge '99/II, Jewish Museum Berlin
- 2000 Körper, Schaubühne am Lehniner Platz Berlin
- 2001 S, Schaubühne am Lehniner Platz Berlin
- 2001 17-25/4 – Dialoge 2001, Schaubühne am Lehniner Platz Berlin
- 2002 noBody, in coproduction with Festival d'Avignon, Schaubühne am Lehniner Platz Berlin
- 2002 Adaptation of noBody for the Cour d'honneur of the Palais des Papes in Avignon
- 2003 insideout, Helmust-List-Halle Graz
- 2004 Impromptus, Schaubühne am Lehniner Platz Berlin
- 2005 Dido and Aeneas, opera according to the composition by Henry Purcell, Berlin State Opera
- 2005 Gezeiten, Schaubühne am Lehniner Platz Berlin
- 2006 Solo für Vladimir Malakhov, House of World Cultures Berlin
- 2006 Dialoge 06 – Radiale Systeme, Radialsystem Berlin
- 2007 Medea, based on the opera "medeamaterial" by Pascal Dusapin (music) / Heiner Müller (text), Grand Théâtre de la Ville de Luxembourg
- 2007 Roméo et Juliette, based on the symphony by Hector Berlioz, Paris Opera
- 2008 Jagden und Formen with music by Wolfgang Rihm, Schauspiel Frankfurt
- 2009 Dialogue 09 – Neues Museum, Neues Museum Berlin
- 2009 Dialogue 09 – MAXXI, MAXXI National Museum of the 21st Century Arts Rome
- 2010 Continu, Schiffbauhalle Zurich
- 2010 Passion, based on the composition by Pascal Dusapin, Théâtre des Champs-Élysées Paris
- 2011 Matsukaze, Opera by Toshio Hosokawa, Théâtre Royal de la Monnaie, Brussels. Co-production: Théâtre Royal de la Monnaie, Grand Théâtre de Luxembourg, Staatsoper Unter den Linden and Teatr Wielki (Warsaw).
- 2021 In C, based on the open composition In C by Terry Riley, Radialsystem_V, Berlin
- 2022: SYM-PHONIE MMXX, Staatsoper Berlin, Berlin. Co-production: Staatsballett Berlin, with music composed by Georg Friedrich Haas.
- 2023: Beethoven 7, Radialsystem_V, Berlin. A two-part dance piece, starting with »Freiheit/Extasis« by the composer Diego Noguera and followed by Ludwig van Beethoven's »Sinfonie Nr.7 in A-Dur (op. 92)«.
- 2024 Johannespassion, opera based on the composition by Johann Sebastian Bach, Felsenreitschule, Salzburg. Co-production: Opéra de Dijon.

== Awards ==
- 1994: Choreography Prize at the International Choreographer's Competition Groningen (NL) for Travelogue I – Twenty to Eight
- 1997: Invitation of Allee der Kosmonauten to the 34th "Berliner Theatertreffen", an annual event of the Berliner Festspiele that invites the 10 most remarkable German theatre productions of the season to be presented in Berlin
- 2000: Adolf Grimme Award for the film adaptation of Allee der Kosmonauten
- 2000: Invitation of Körper to the 37th "Berliner Theatertreffen"
- 2007: "Choreographer of the Year", by ballettanz, German dance magazine
- 2008: Europe Theatre Prize - Europe Prize Theatrical Realities
- 2009: 1st prize of the Critique's Survey of Die Deutsche Bühne, Germany's oldest theatre magazine
- 2009: Order of Arts and Letters
- 2010: Friederike Caroline Neuber Prize of the City of Leipzig, Germany
- 2022: Nominated in the Bessie Awards category "Outstanding Choreographer/Creator" for In C at the Brooklyn Academy of Music
- 2024: Appointed Commander of Arts and Letters by the Ministry of Culture (France)
- 2024: Winner of the Deutscher Tanzpreis for her "artistically unique and discipline-breaking body of work".

== Bibliography ==
- Yvonne Hardt, Sasha Waltz. Palermo, L'Epos, 2007. ISBN 978-88-8302-337-8

== Reviews ==
- "Ausweidung der Kampfzone", Die Zeit, 24. November 2005
- "Die Geilheit unter der Puderperücke", Berliner Zeitung, 1 March 2006
- "Das Pathos der Trauer", Netzeitung, 19 September 2007
- "Unter Todeskieseln", Die Welt, 8 October 2007
- "Sasha Waltz & Guests, Brooklyn Academy of Music, New York", The Financial Times about "Gezeiten" (Tides), 9 November 2010.
