= Sandig =

Sandig is a surname. Notable people with the surname include:

- Curt Sandig (born 1918), American football player
- Jochen Sandig (born 1968), German cultural entrepreneur
- Madeleine Sandig (born 1983), German cyclist
- Marita Sandig (born 1958), German rower
- Rudolf Sandig (1911–1994), German SS officer
- Ulrike Almut Sandig (born 1979), German writer
