= Hargitay =

Hargitay is a Hungarian surname also known in its alternative form, Hargitai. The name means "from Hargita", a historical region of Hungary now called Harghita in present-day Romania.

Hargitay or Hargitai is a surname. Notable people with the surname include:

- Ákos Hargitai (born 1964), Hungarian dancer
- János Hargitai, Hungarian jurist and politician
- András Hargitay (born 1956), Hungarian swimmer
- Mariska Hargitay (born 1964), American actress, director and philanthropist
- Mickey Hargitay (1926–2006), Hungarian-American actor and fitness celebrity
- Peter Hargitay (born 1951), partner of the European Consultancy Network
