= Azade Shahmiri =

Iranian theatre director and playwright (born 1982)

- Born: 13 May 1982 (age 44); Tehran (Iran)
- Website: Official website

Azade Shahmiri (Persian: آزاده شاهمیری; born on May 13, 1982) is an Iranian theatre artist and performance maker who was born in Tehran, Iran. Shahmiri also works as a journalist, researcher and performer.

== Works ==
=== Quasi ===
Three characters talk about life in present-day Iran, overcoming time, place, and body constraints. Along with the fragmentary shots taken in Tehran in 2001, the stories are incomplete, open, and interwoven, underscoring the permeability of identities.

Quasi was created in Tehran in 2020/21 and premiered at the Wiener Festwochen in June 2021. It was presented at the Points Communs Festival in Cergy, France, beursschouwburg theater in Brussels, and Kaserne Basel during March and April 2022.

=== Tempor(e)ality ===
This lecture performance examines the historically imagined representation of the West and at the same time reflects on the position of an Iranian performer on a European theater stage today.

Tempor(e)ality was part of the White Money Project by Flinn Works and premiered in November 2021 at Sophiensaele, Berlin.

=== Unperforming ===
This solo performance installation focuses on the privilege of gazing into performance space by digging out the power relations between the audience and the performer.

Unperforming was created in Tehran and Mannheim in 2018 and premiered at the Theatre Festival Schwindelfrei Mannheim.

=== Voicelessness ===
is a semi-documentary investigative play that illustrates the science fiction story of a mother and her daughter in the future. The girl is attempting to learn more about the suspicious disappearance of her grandfather more than fifty years earlier. But there is a lack of evidence.

Voicelessness premiered at Kunstenfestivaldesarts in Brussels in 2017 and was performed at the Edinburgh International Festival, Zürcher Theater Spektakel, International Theatre Festival of Kerala ITFoK, Theatre de l' Usine, Geneva, City Theatre, and the Wiener Festwochen, Kyto Experiments, between 2017 and 2022.

=== Museum ===
This site-specific performance aims to shape a meta-performance through reenactment and re-making of a project performed once in the past. To re-present a performance titled Nearby Museum in a different place and with a new performer, the group faced some challenges that dramatically affected the whole project; the text, the narratives, the space, and the relationships.

Museum was created in 2019 in Tehran and premiered at the Iran International Fadjr Theatre Festival's Off-Stage Program.

=== Damascus ===
Through a study of the ancient history of Damascus, this lecture performance turns into the narratives of everyday life and aspects of the current brutal reality of a city resisting destruction.

Damascus was created and premiered in Tehran in 2013. It was performed in Zürcher Theater Spektakel and Asian Arts Theatre in South Korea. The text was published in Persian by Mania Honar Publishing in Iran in 2021.

== Awards and honours ==
During the 12th international university theatre festival, Shahmiri won the award for the best play text for "Black Skin, White Masks".

In 2014 Shahmiri won the Parvin literary award, which is an Iranian state-financed award, for "Research compilation: theory and critique of post-colonialism".

== Publications ==
- Grammar of Acts: An archive in progress for open ended performances, Performance Text, Pages Magazine, Volume 11, 2023
- Damascus A Performance Text, Mania Honar Publications, Tehran, 2021
- Murder in Scriptorium Monologue, Ketab-e Azad Publications, Tehran, 2015
- Postcolonial Theory and Criticism, Elm publications, Tehran, 2010
