= Kunsthaus Tacheles =

Former arts center in Berlin, Germany

Coordinates: 52°31′32″N 13°23′19″E

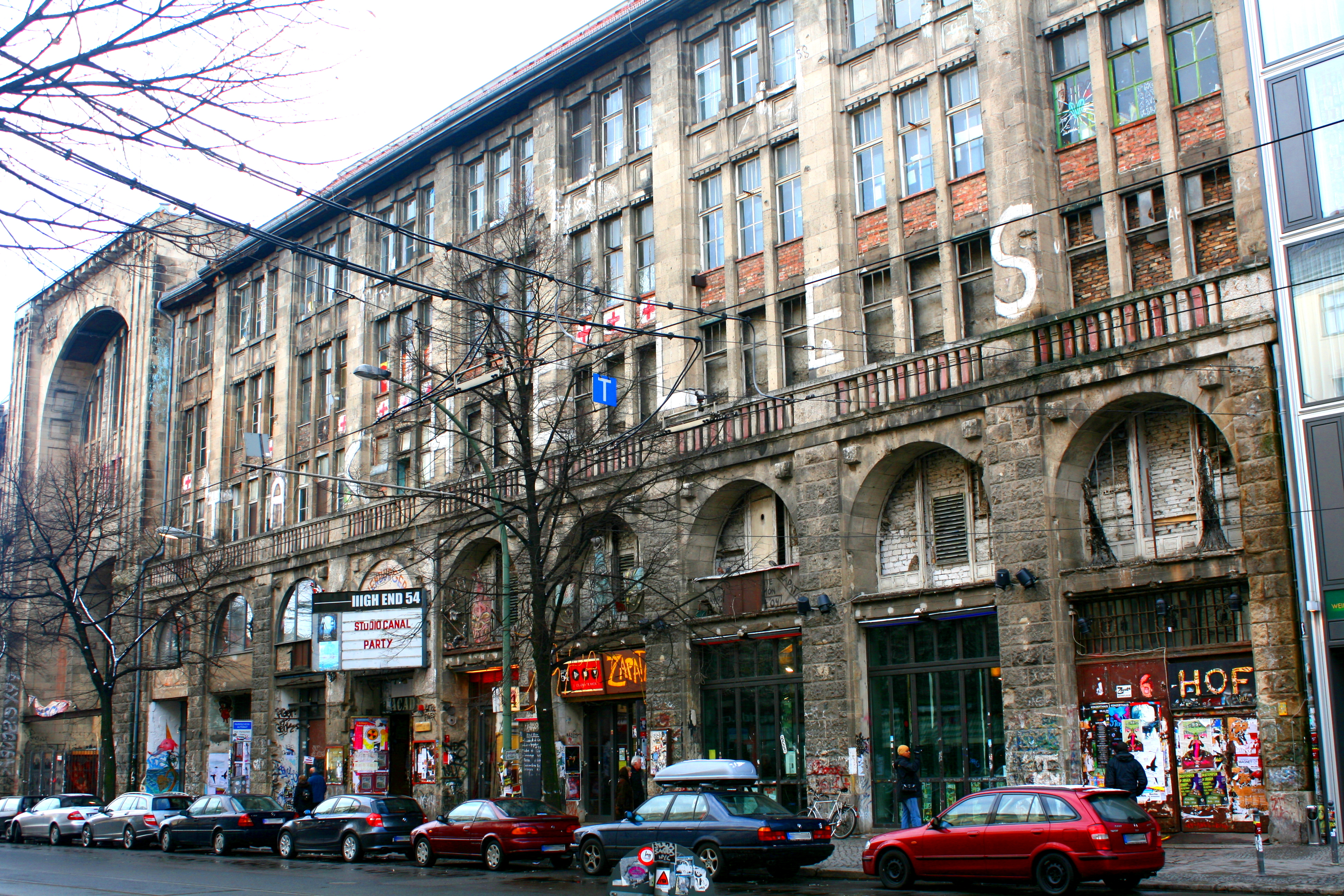
- Facade of Kunsthaus Tacheles at Oranienburger Straße
- Established: 1990
- Location: Oranienburger Straße 54, 56a Berlin, Germany
- Type: Art gallery, Art house
- Website: tacheles.de

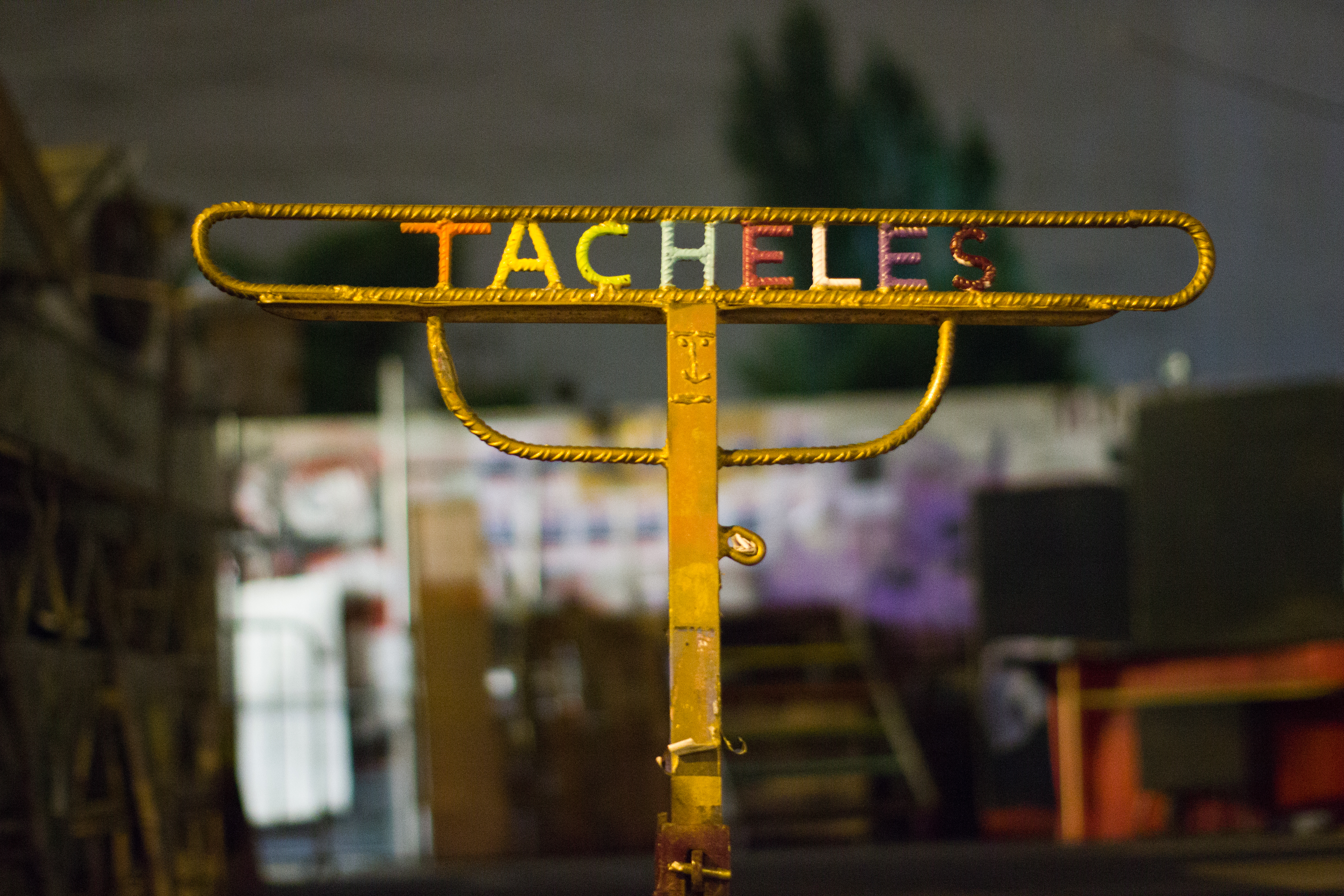
A sign for Tacheles at the entrance

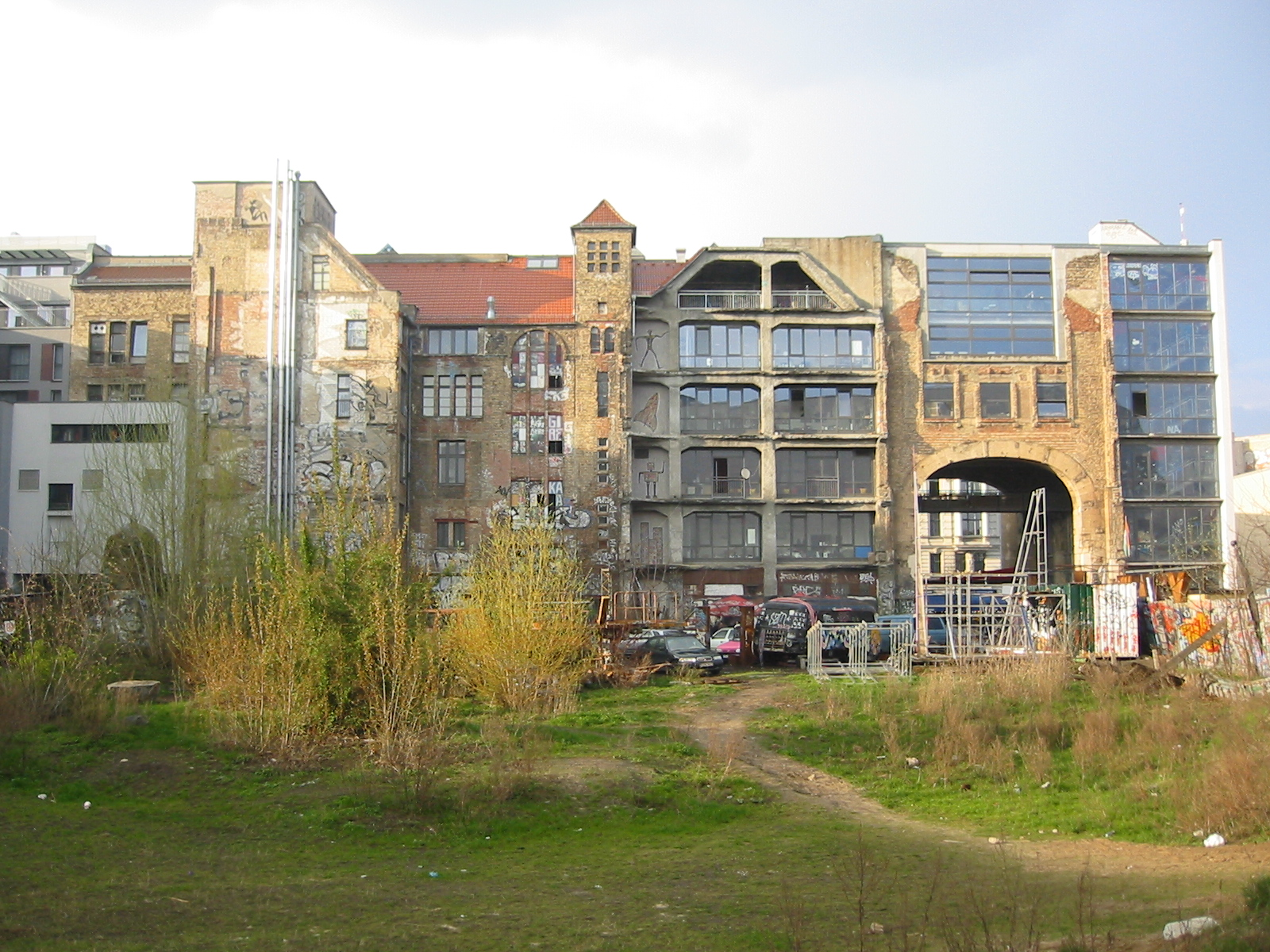
Tacheles (2006) from the rear

The Kunsthaus Tacheles ([ˈkʰʊnst.haʊ̯s ˈtaxələs], lit. 'Art-house "Straight-Talking"') was an art center in Berlin, Germany, a large (9,000 m^{2} (97,000 sq ft)) building and sculpture park on Oranienburger Straße, in the sub-neighborhood of Spandauer Vorstadt in the Mitte district. Huge, colorful graffiti-style murals were painted on the exterior walls, and modern art sculptures were featured inside. The building housed an artist collective from 1990 until 2012.

Originally called Friedrichstraßenpassage, it was built in 1907–1908 as a department store opposite the synagogue. During World War II it served as a Nazi prison for a short while. Under GDR authorities it was later partially demolished. After the Berlin Wall had come down in 1989, it was taken over by artists, who called it Tacheles, "straight talking," a term taken from Yiddish תּכלית (takhles, 'purpose, result'). The building contained studios and workshops, a nightclub, and a cinema. Outside, the garden featured an open-air exhibition of metal sculptures as well as galleries and studios for sculptors and painters.

== History ==
=== Friedrichstraßenpassage ===
The building was constructed over the course of 15 months in 1907 and 1908 under the watch of the imperial building consellor (kaiserlicher Baurat) Franz Ahrens. The building complex stretched from Friedrichstraße to Oranienburger Straße. The shopping arcade had entrances from both sides and served to connect the two main thoroughfares. The Friedrichstraßenpassage was the second largest of its kind in the city and the only remaining example in Europe of this type of architecture. The construction expenses totaled approximately 7 million German marks.

The five-story building was made of reinforced concrete with a colossal ribbed dome. The façade was built to be dependent upon this concrete frame. There were several small businesses on both sides of the large covered arcade. The building is typically treated as an example of early Modern architecture but exhibits aspects of both Classic and Gothic styles. The complex also housed its own pneumatic tube system for sending mail and materials within the building.

A group of individual shareholders hoped to establish a market advantage by capitalizing on a common location. The concept meant that stores would not be strictly separated from one another, but would instead be allowed to overlap. This was enabled by the existence of a central point-of-sale terminal, where all customers would pay for their goods. But a mere 6 months after its opening the passage had to file for bankruptcy in August 1908. The complex was then rented by Wolf Wertheim, who in 1909 opened a new department store, which operated until 1914. The building was auctioned off shortly before World War I.

It is unclear how the building was used between 1914 and 1924. In 1924, among other additions to the building, a deep cellar was built. This cellar still exists today and is also known as the Tresorraum. The height of the ceiling in the passage was lowered to that of the stores, which changed the appearance of the building completely.

=== Haus der Technik ===
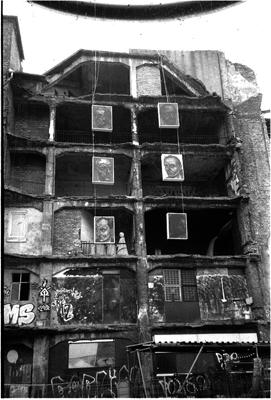
Tacheles (1997)

After 1928 the building was used as a show room by the Allgemeine Elektrizitäts-Gesellschaft (General Electric Company). It was renamed Haus der Technik by the proprietor, the Berliner Commerz- und Privatbank. The AEG used the space to display products and advise customers. The former AEG show room, located at Luisenstraße 35, had been destroyed by a fire on September 15, 1927. The new space covered over 113,000 sq ft (10,500 sq. meters) and used 20 large display cases. One of the first German television transmissions took place here during the 1930s.

=== Use by the NSDAP ===
In the early 1930s, the building was increasingly used by the National Socialist German Workers' Party (Nazi) party members. In the mid-1930s, the German Workers Front established offices for Gau Kurmark and became owners of the building in 1941. At the same time it became the central office for the SS.

In 1943 the skylights were closed and the corresponding ridge turrets removed, so that French war prisoners could be held in the attic. During the Battle of Berlin the second cellar was flooded by the Nazis and remains underwater today. The building was heavily damaged during World War II, though a large portion of it survived intact.

=== Use in the GDR ===
In 1948 the building was taken over by the Free German Trade Union Federation (FDGB) and deteriorated over the course of the next several years. Various retailers and craft businesses temporarily moved into the ruins, especially on the Friedrichstraße side. The German Travel Agency used the repaired passage section and several floors above ground. Among others, there was an artists' school, a technical school for foreign trade and economics, and office spaces for RFT (Rundfunk- und Fernmelde-Technik), a company dealing with radio and transmission technology. The cellar was used by the National People's Army.

The movie theater Camera was located in the Friedrichstraße gateway area, but was forced to leave in 1958 due to the worsening condition of the building. The presentation hall was dismantled, but was later reopened under the name OTL (Oranienburger Tor Lichtspiele). During the reconstruction work the facade was partially changed and a lobby area was built to house cash registers and checkout aisles. The roof was also rebuilt. This created the current entryway. The movie theater is still used today as a theater area, and after further reconstruction in 1972, it was renamed Camera.

=== Partial demolition ===
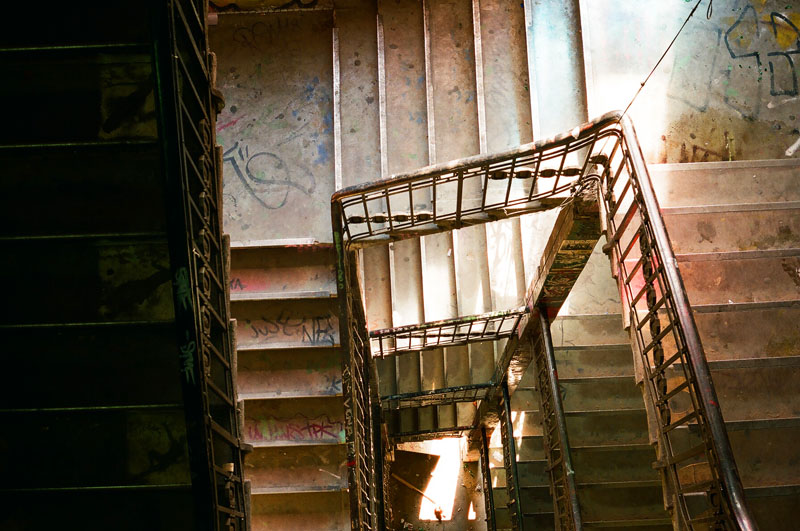
Staircase in the Tacheles (2009)

The building was slated to be demolished as a result of two engineering opinions from 1969 and 1977; it had not once been renovated, despite relatively continuous and intensive use. A new street was planned on the site and would have created a shortcut between Oranienburger Straße and Friedrichstraße.

The demolition began in 1980. The dome was torn down and the movie theater closed. The remaining portions of the building were scheduled to be demolished in April 1990.

=== Artists' Initiative Tacheles ===
On February 13, 1990, two months before the planned demolition, the group Künstlerinitative Tacheles occupied the building. The group tried to prevent the demolition through discussions with the building management in Berlin-Mitte, which was legally responsible for the complex, by registering the building as a historic place. The planned demolition was not delayed however, until the group managed to get the Berlin Round Table to issue a last-minute injunction.

The artists' initiative had a new engineering survey done to evaluate the building's structural integrity. The study found that the building was in surprisingly good shape, and it was named a historic landmark shortly thereafter. Its status was officially recognized after a second survey done in February 1992.

In the beginning the center was run by well-known curator Jochen Sandig who expanded the building considerably. In its early days, Tacheles provided both housing and work space for its artist residents. In 1991, the associated housing burnt down and there was considerable suspicion that the fire was started deliberately in order to pave the way for a new art center. Among the early exhibitors were artist Mark Divo, sculptors the Mutoid Waste Company, musicians Spiral Tribe, theater group DNTT, performance artist Lennie Lee, dancer/ choreographer Sasha Waltz, RA.M.M. Theater, and many others.

There was an appreciable amount of disagreement among the East German and West German artists due to their conflicting views and concepts for the space. In the meantime, however, Tacheles has become a central part of the art, activist, exhibition and communication scenes in Berlin, and is officially registered as Tacheles, e. V.. In 1996 and 1997, politicians, sociologists, architects, and artists discussed the preservation and future use of the complex at Metropolis Berlin, Hochgeschwindigkeitsarchitektur (English: Metropolis Berlin, High Speed Architecture).

=== Use until 2011 ===
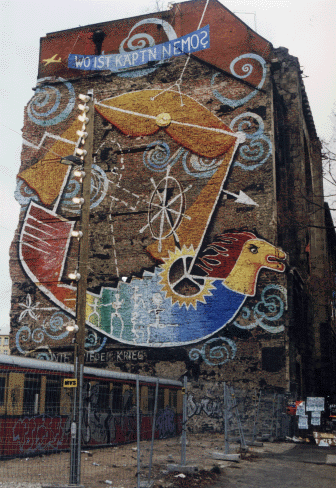
One of Kunsthaus Tacheles walls. The graffiti says "Where is Captain Nemo?"

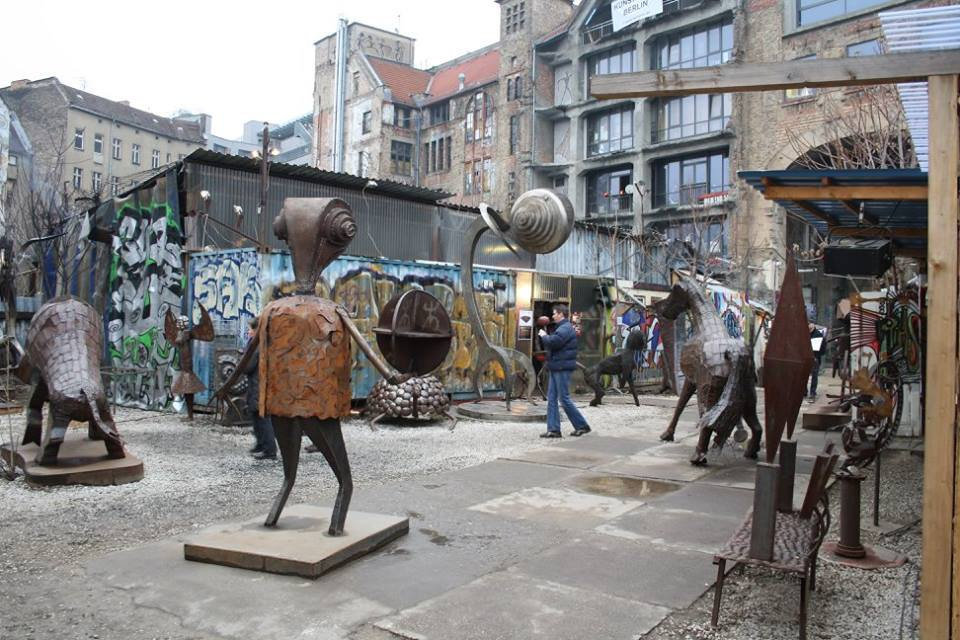
Sculpture park (2011)

The building was painted in bright colors and a large courtyard behind the building holds several sculptures erected using rubble, debris, vehicles and other objects. It became an art center with a cafe, cinema, performance space, workshops and exhibition space.

Tacheles provided inspiration for a scene in the German film Good Bye, Lenin!, according to commentary by director Wolfgang Becker on the US DVD release.

A developer called the Fundus Group had bought the site from the Berlin government in the mid-1990s. Because it was in no hurry to do anything with the building, it gave the artists a 10-year lease in 1998 at a nominal rent of 1 DM (about 0.50 EUR). This contract was then extended but expired at the end of 2009, at which point the artists again became squatters. By this time, the Fundus Group had become insolvent, so the Hamburg-based HSH Nordbank, to which the Fundus Group owed money, decided to sell the property.

=== End of Tacheles ===
By 2010, a division inside the Tacheles cooperative developed. "Upstairs" lived the artists from the coterie around organizer Martin Reiter, chairman of Tacheles e.V., the association that was formed in 1994 but went bankrupt in 2010. "Downstairs" around 20 businesses including High End Kino 54 and Café Zapata, together with the Johannishof artists who were not represented by the e.V., formed Gruppe Tacheles.

On April 4, 2011, the owner HSH Nordbank scheduled an eviction, but it was not carried out. Instead, on the next day, the "downstairs group" left the building peacefully in return for a payment of EUR 1 million from an anonymous source. Eighty "upstairs" artists vowed to stay and continue to use their ateliers and metal workshops. One week later, the building's owner ordered an almost 3m tall wall to be built, separating Oranienburger Straße from the building's courtyard.

On September 4, 2012, the remaining 40-60 artists left peacefully, after pressure from HSH Nordbank. Tacheles Metallwerkstatt, the sculpture park, was open until March 2013, when the financial group Nordbank decided to make money out of it.

Several artists and programmers created a Tacheles 3D online art gallery, to open up new rooms for the Tacheles artists, and to continue the spirit of Tacheles online. The association Artprotacheles aims at expanding the idea of Tacheles through Mobile Atelier Projects and has already realised the first one in Berlin Friedrichshain. A few of the Tacheles artists have moved to a property in Marzahn.

=== Sale in 2014 and new development ===
The property was sold to a New York firm in September 2014. Lead architects for the project development after 2015 were Herzog de Meuron. Construction began in September 2019 for a mixed-use scheme that follows the trend of the 1990s to fill in vacant land in Berlin with perimeter block buildings, utilizing courtyards and mimicking the traditional urban structure of the city.

Since September 2023, the building is home to the photography museum Fotografiska Berlin.

== Gallery ==
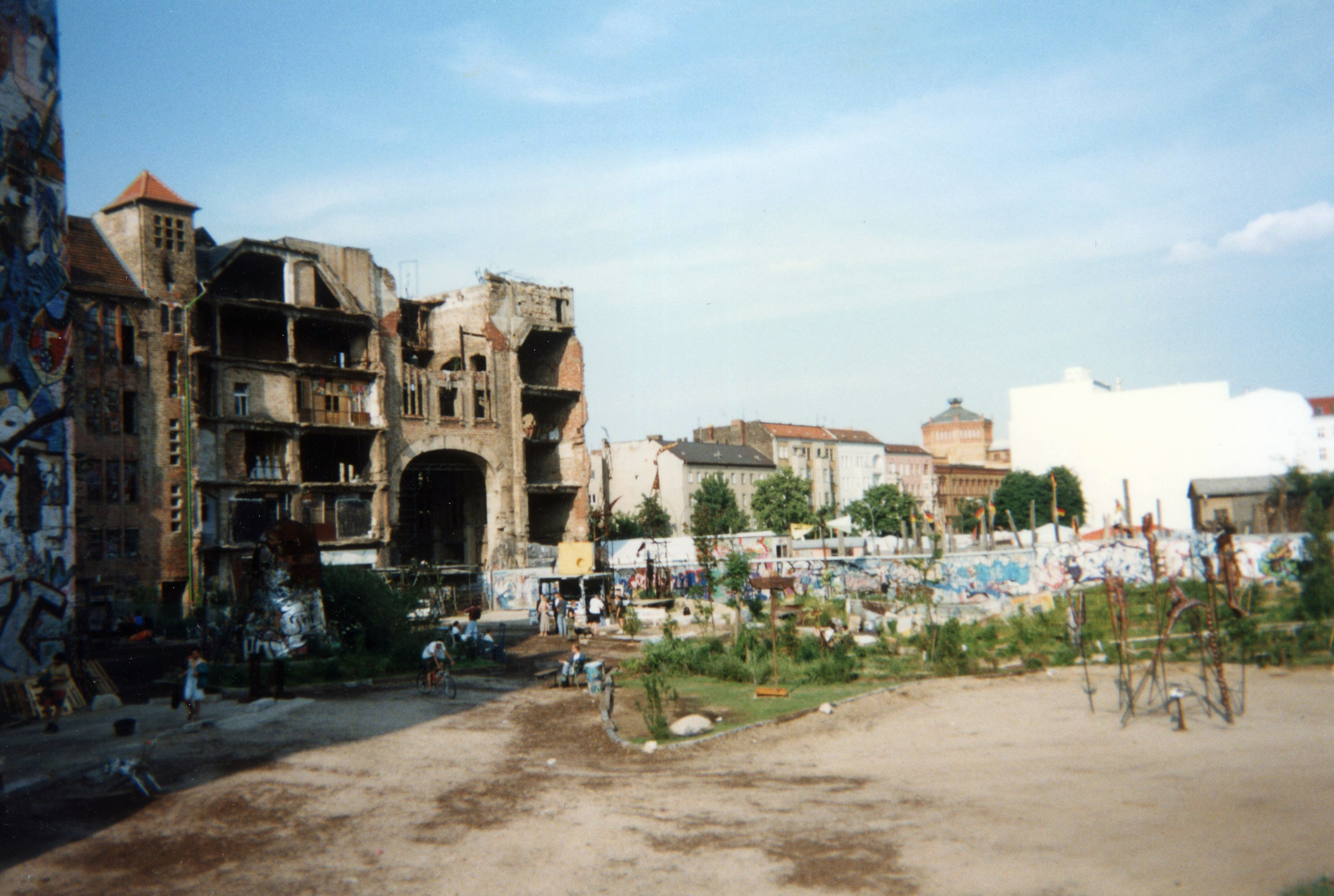

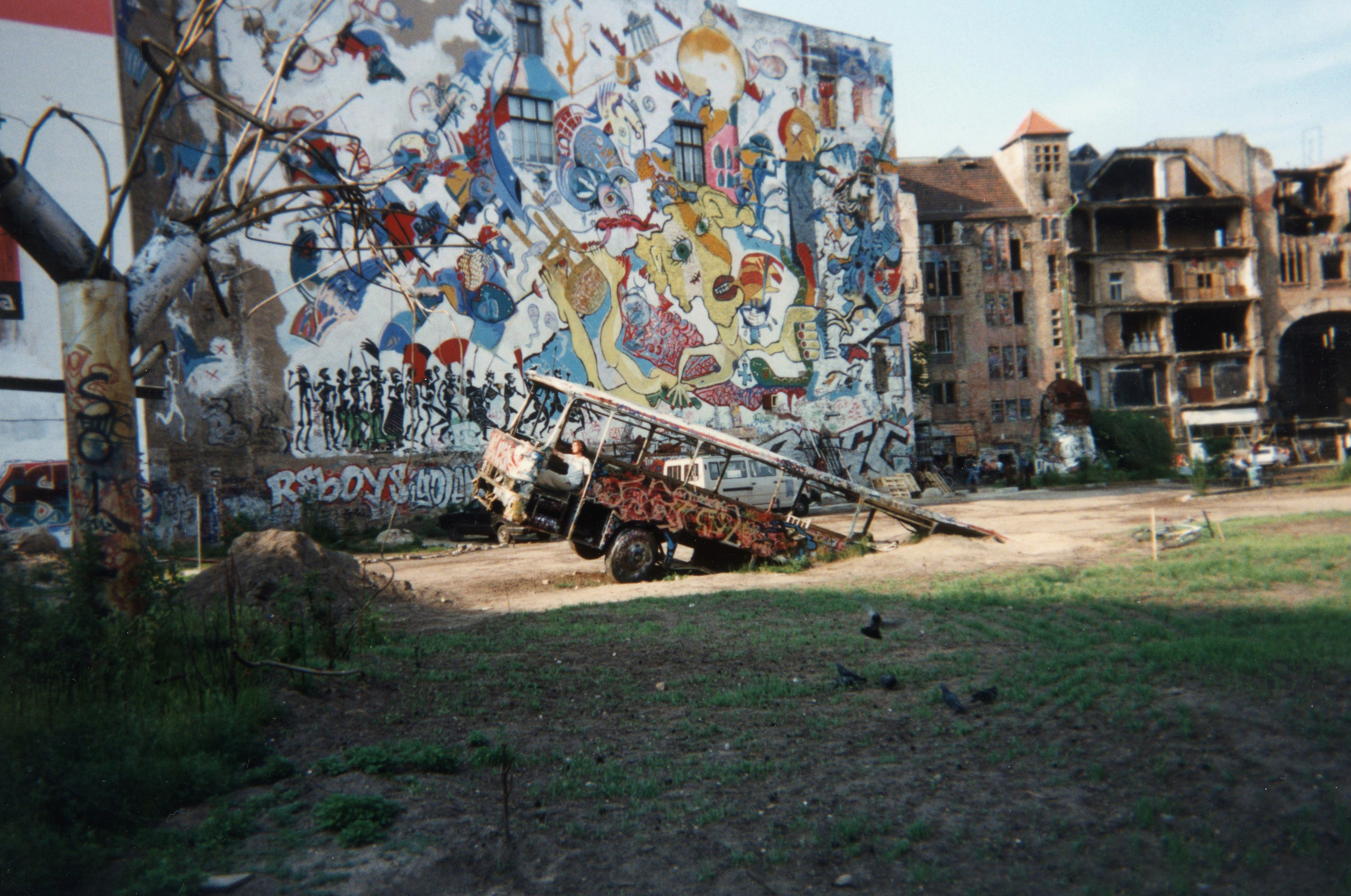

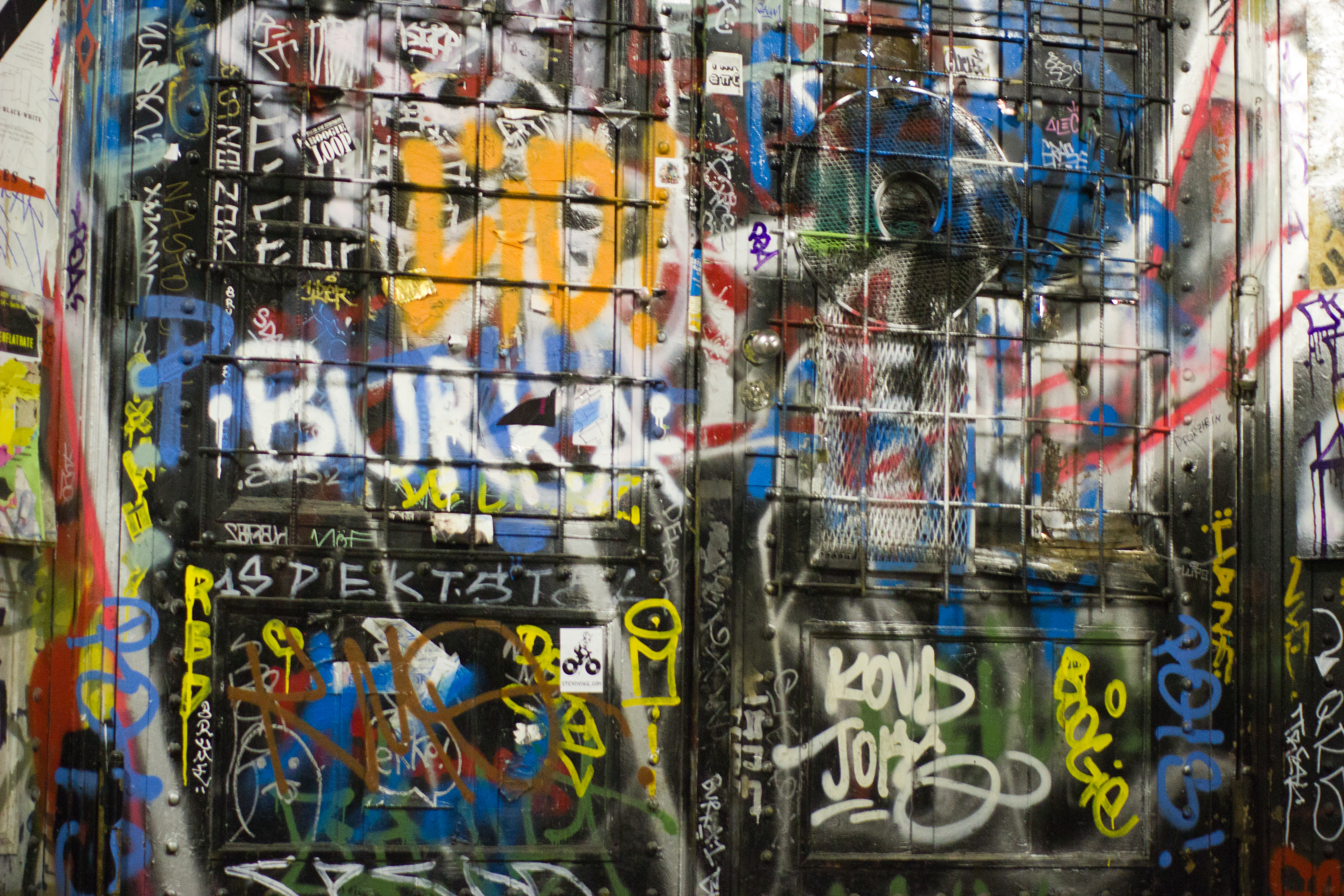

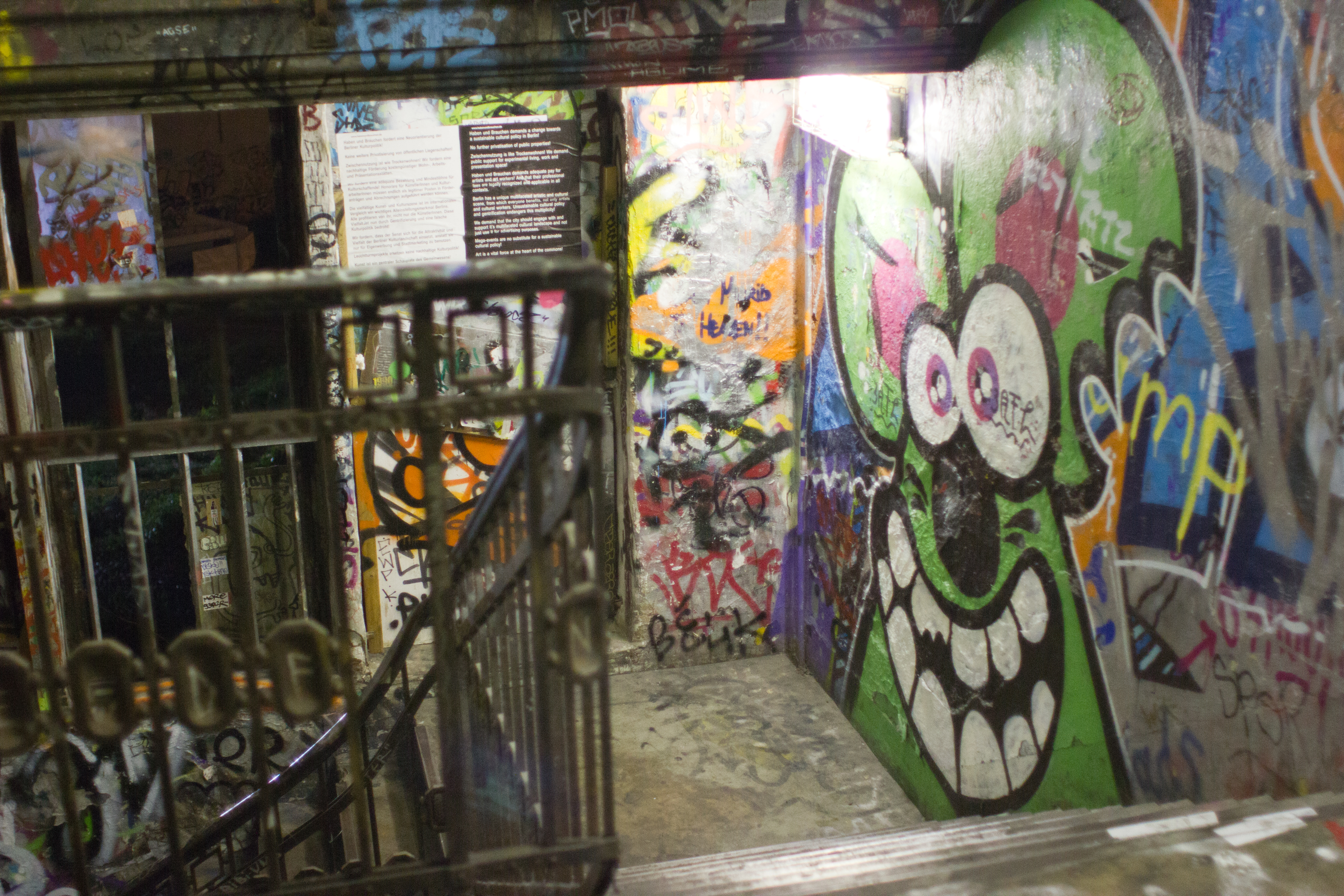

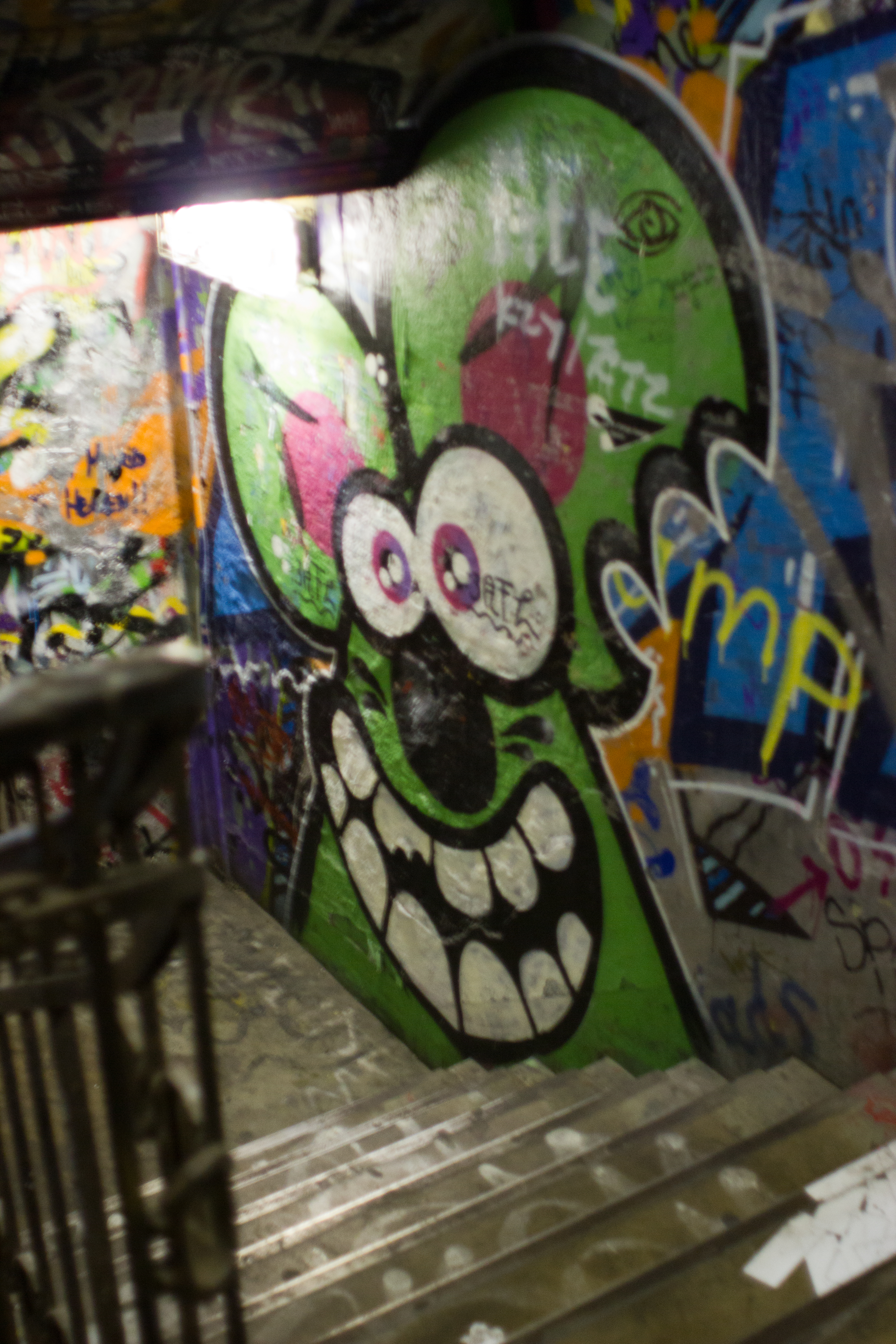

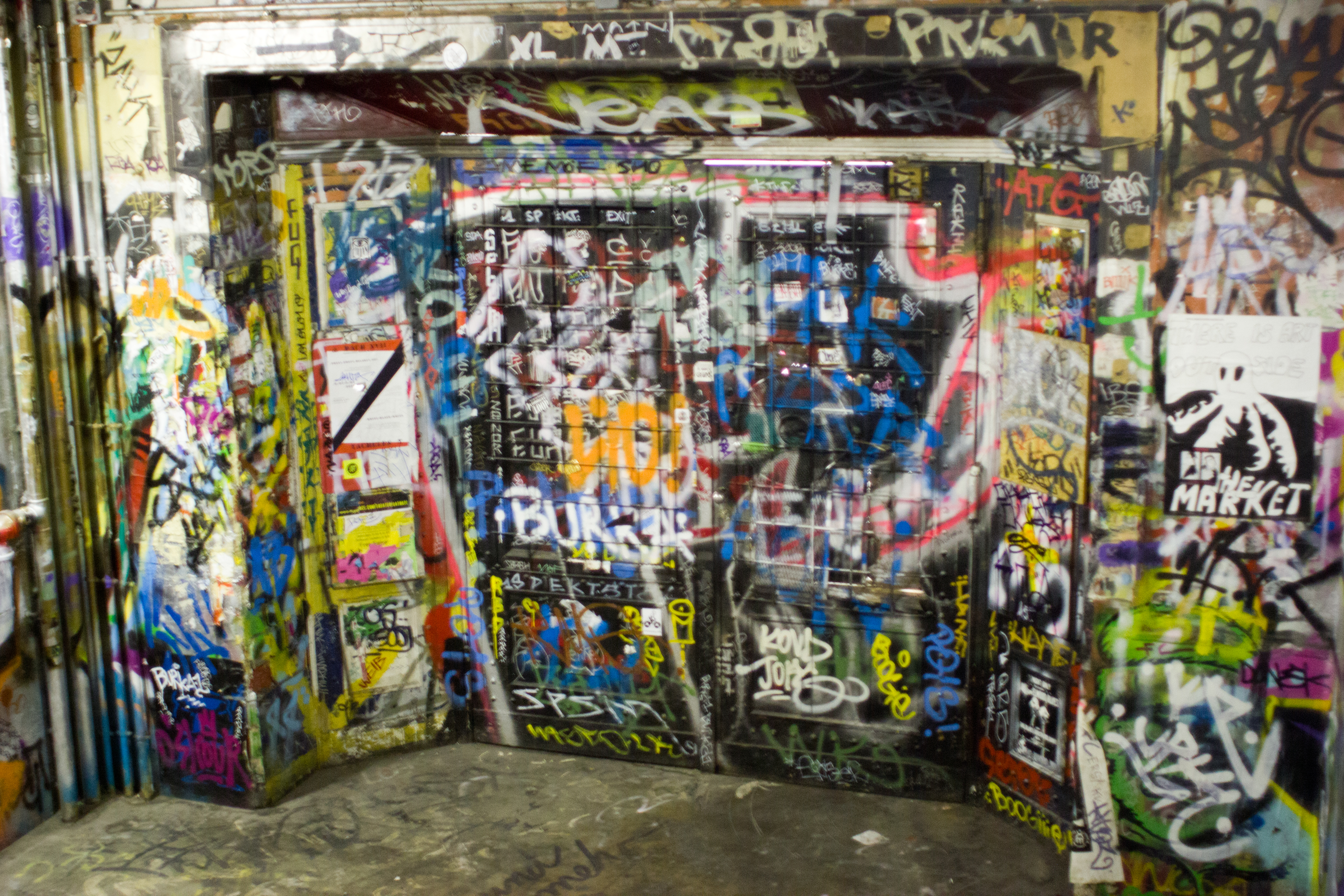

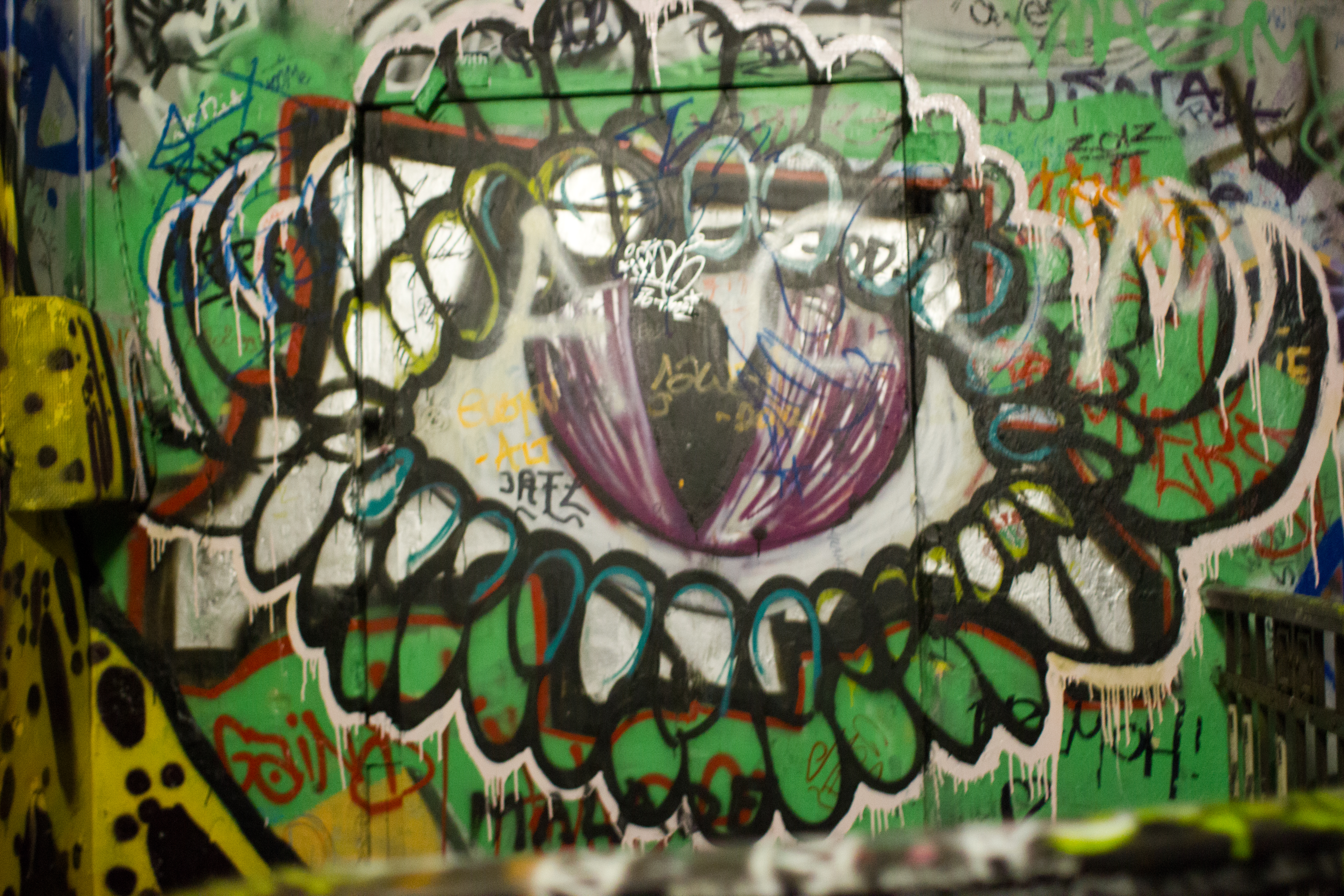

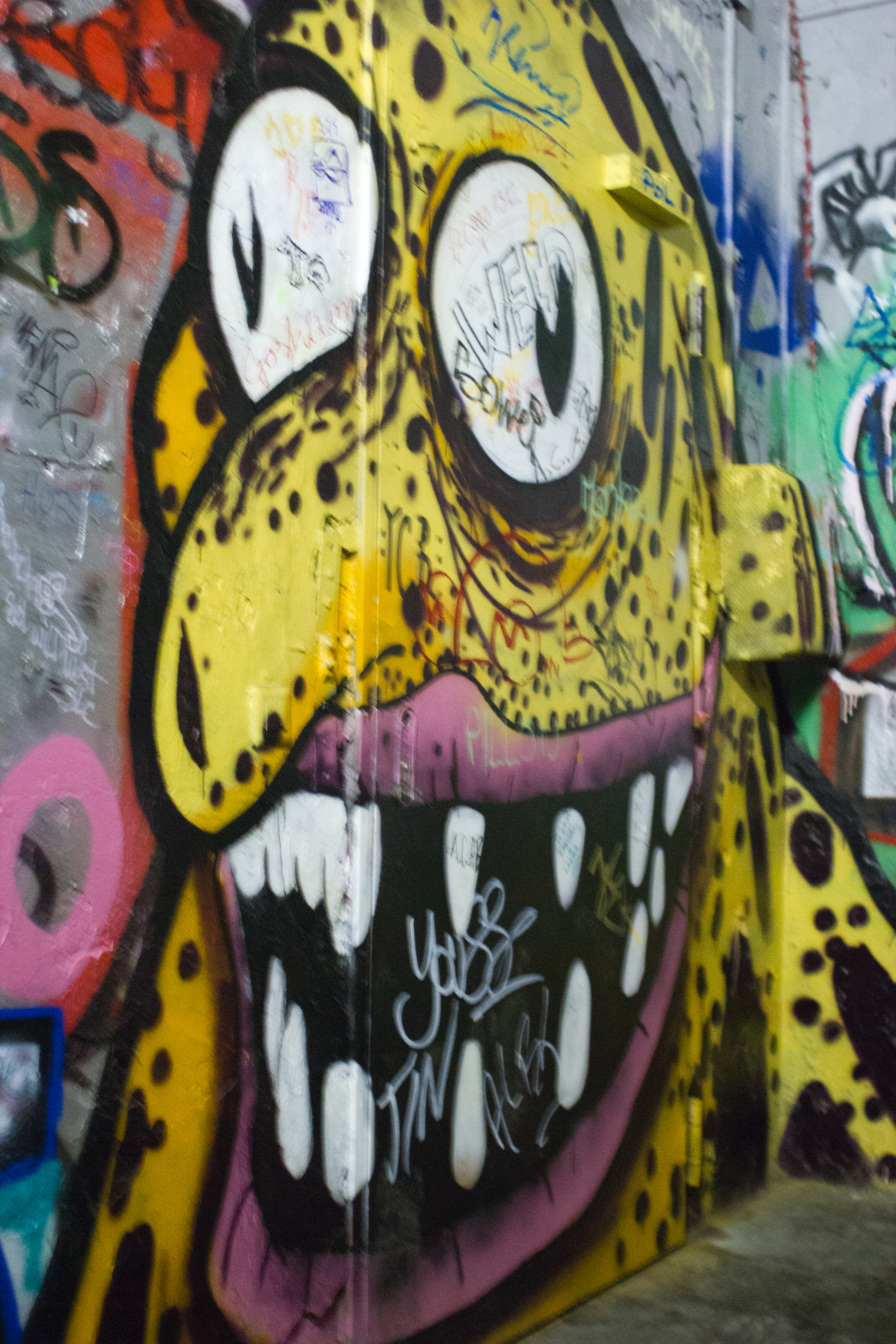

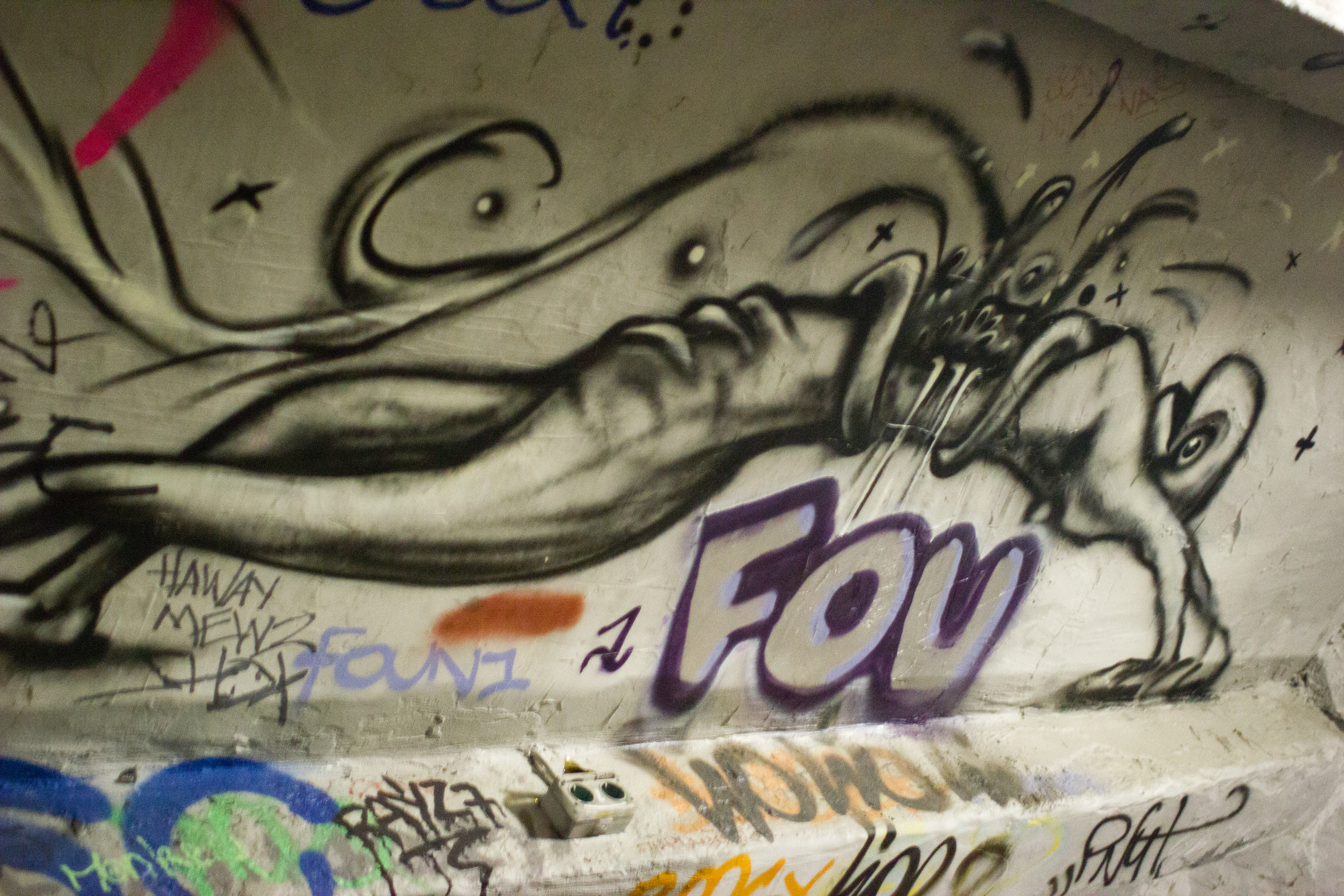

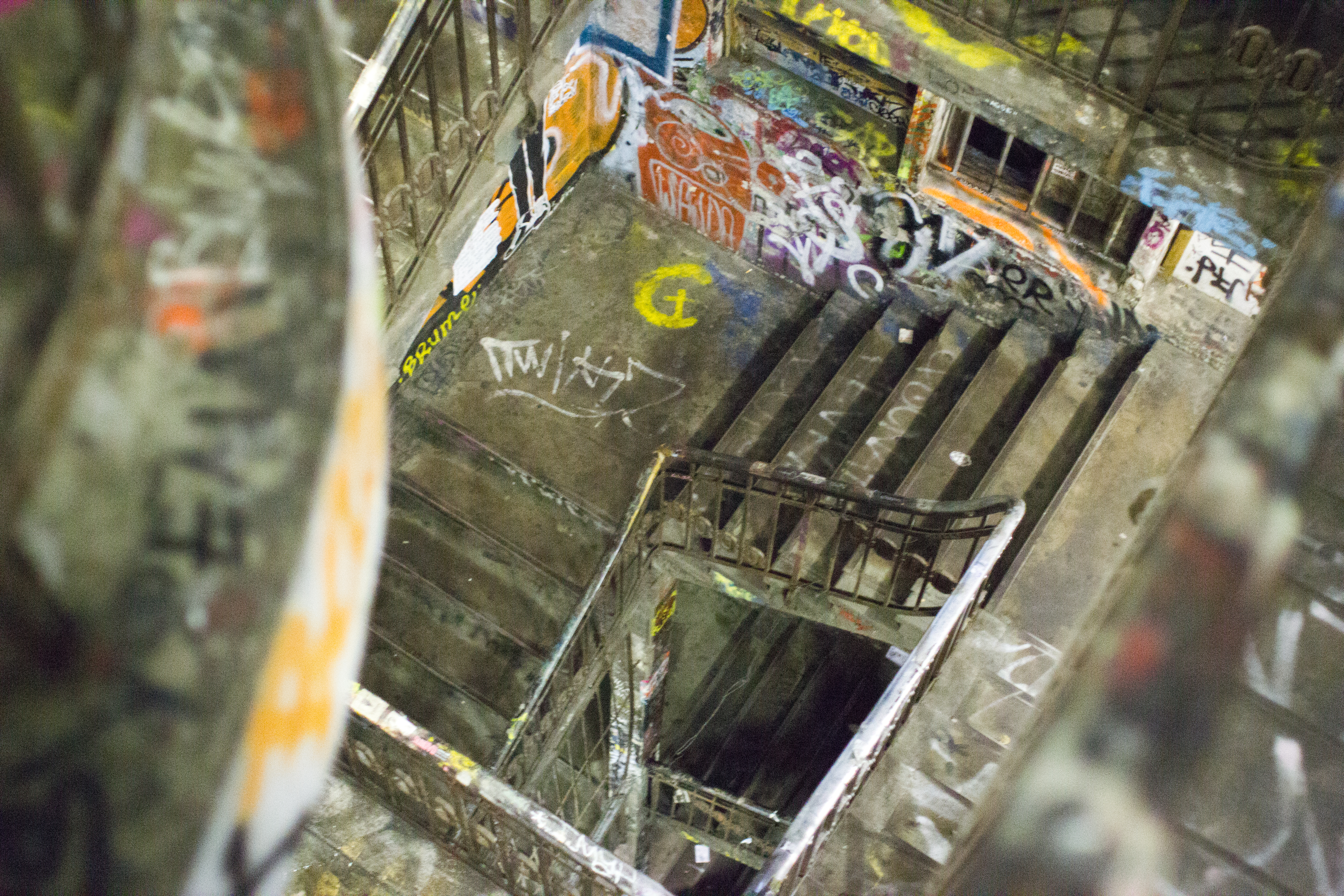

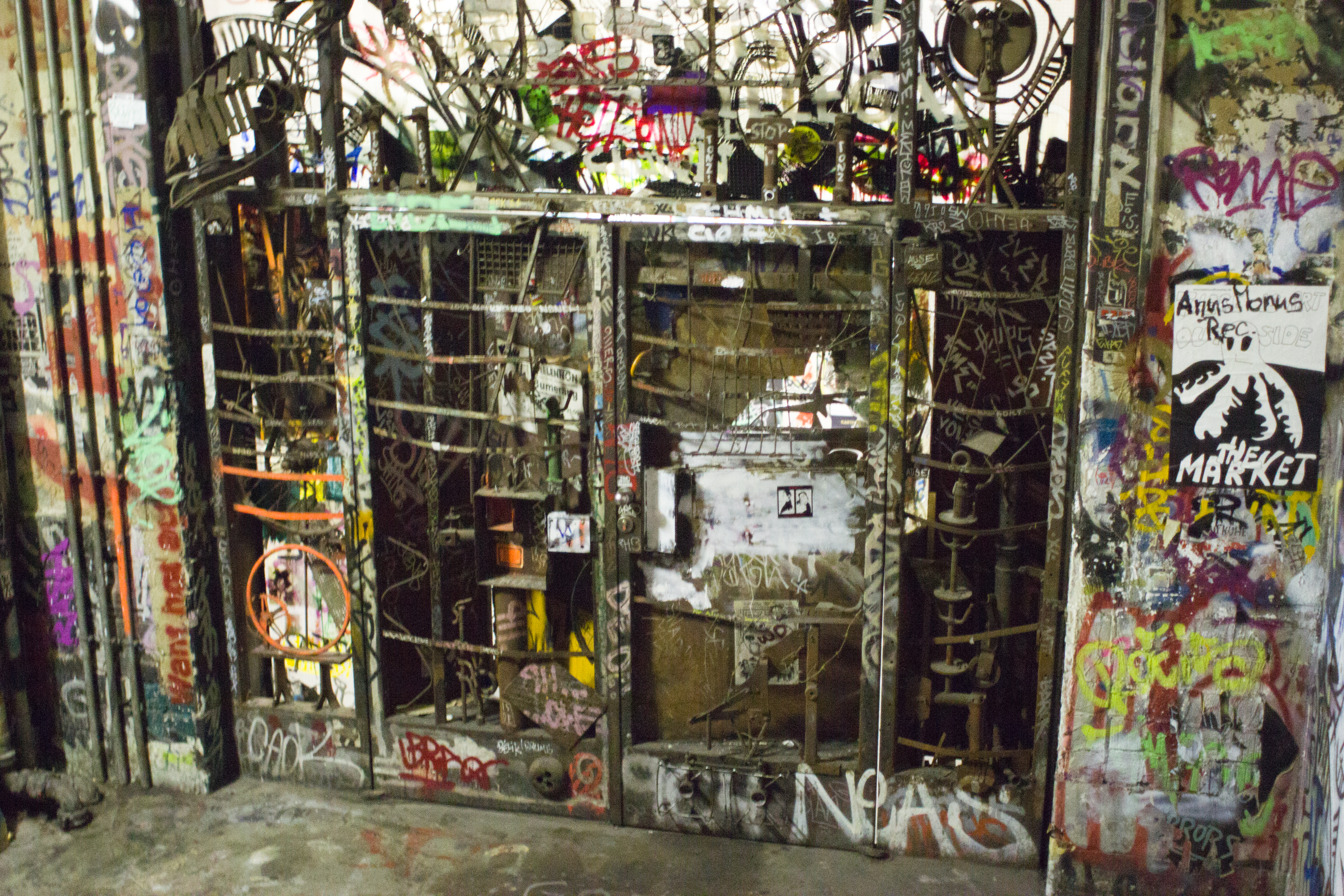

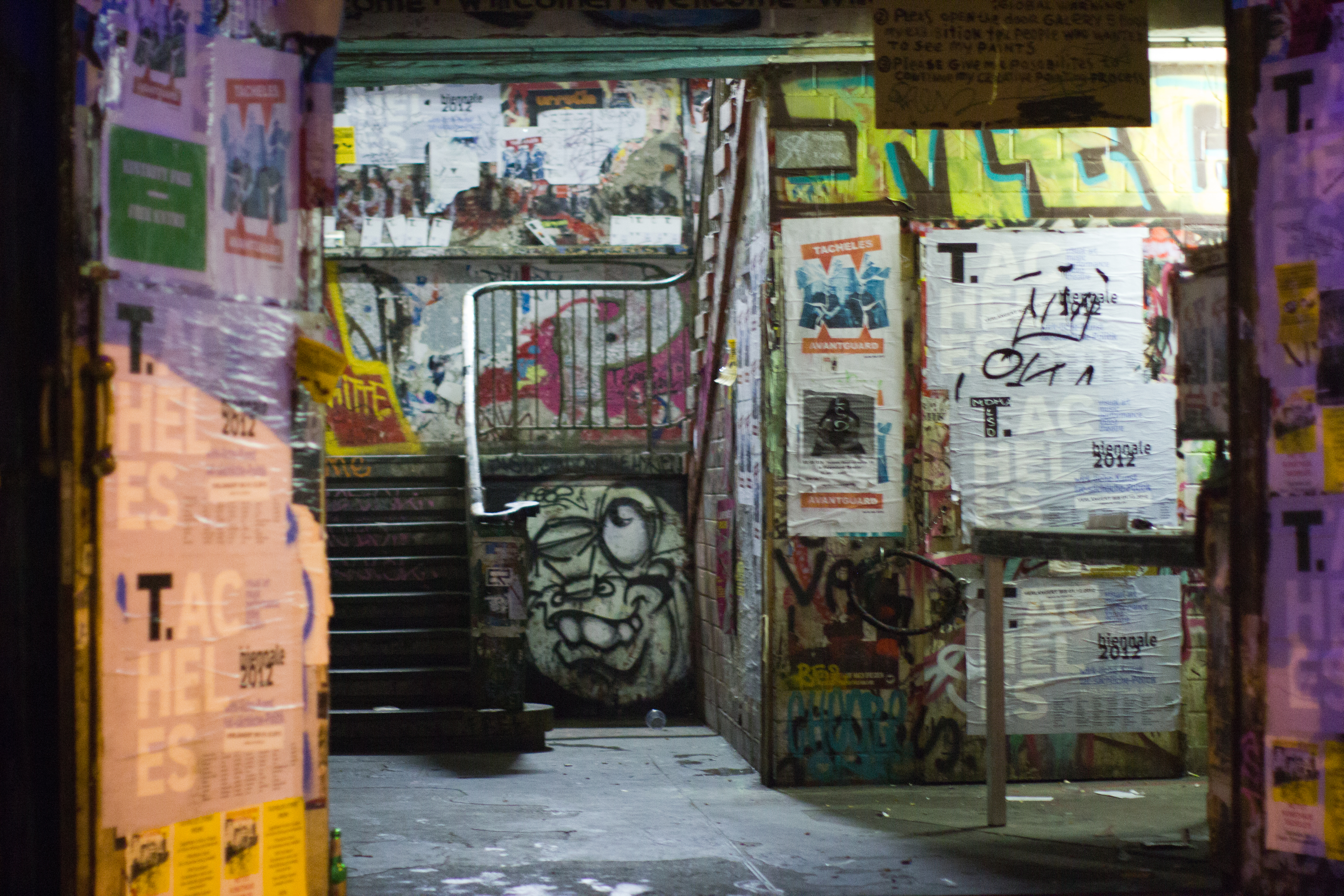

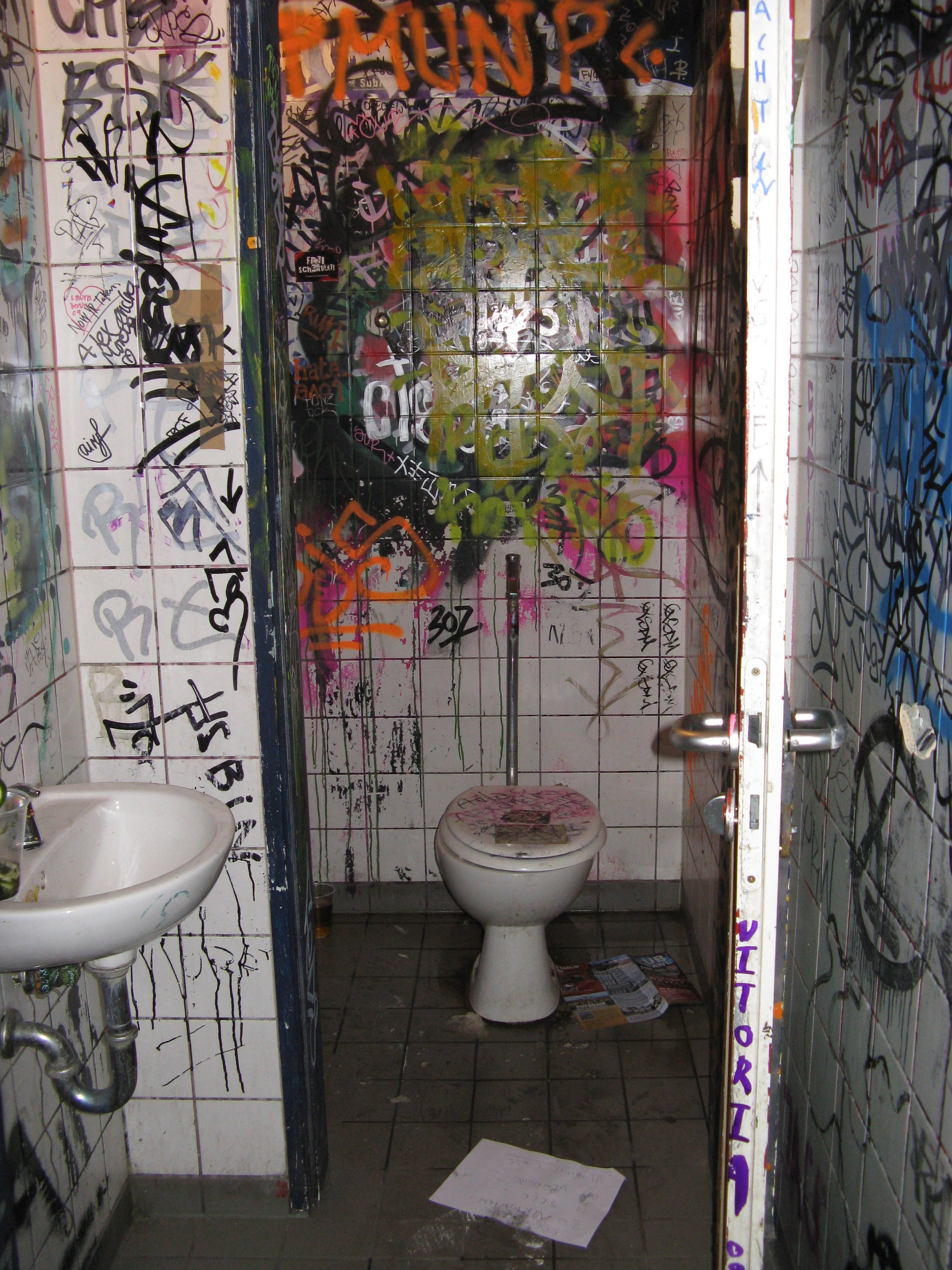

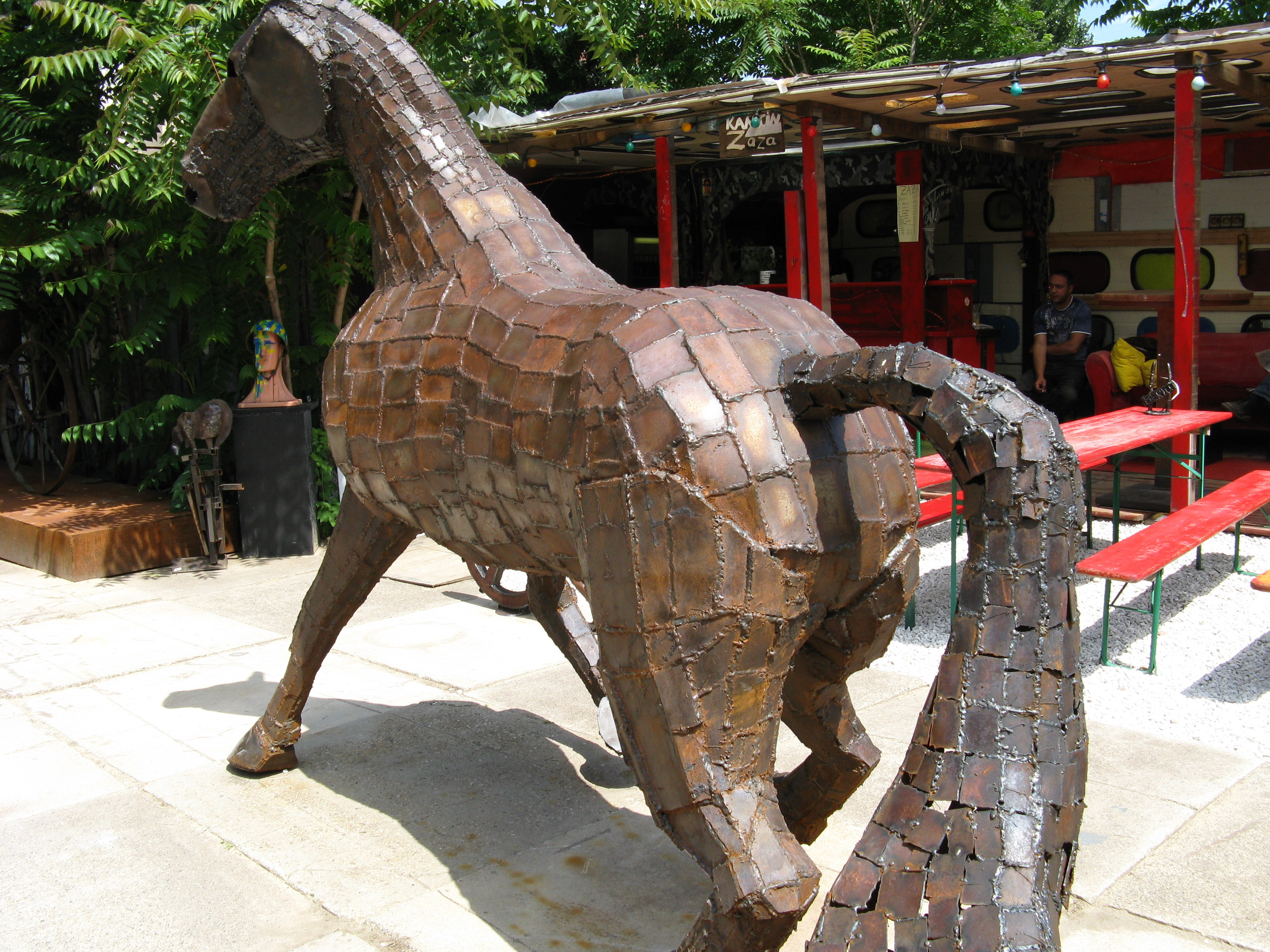

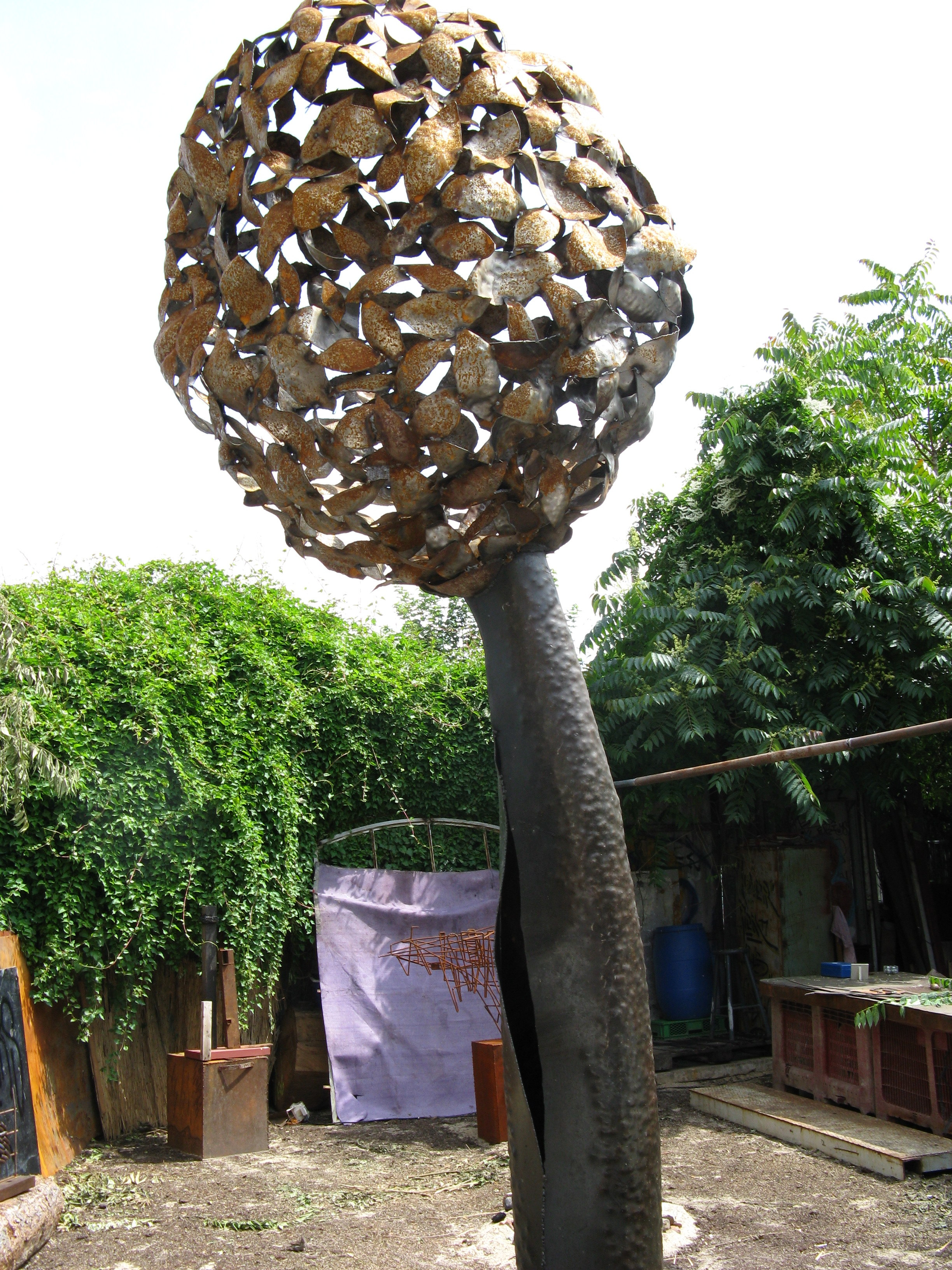

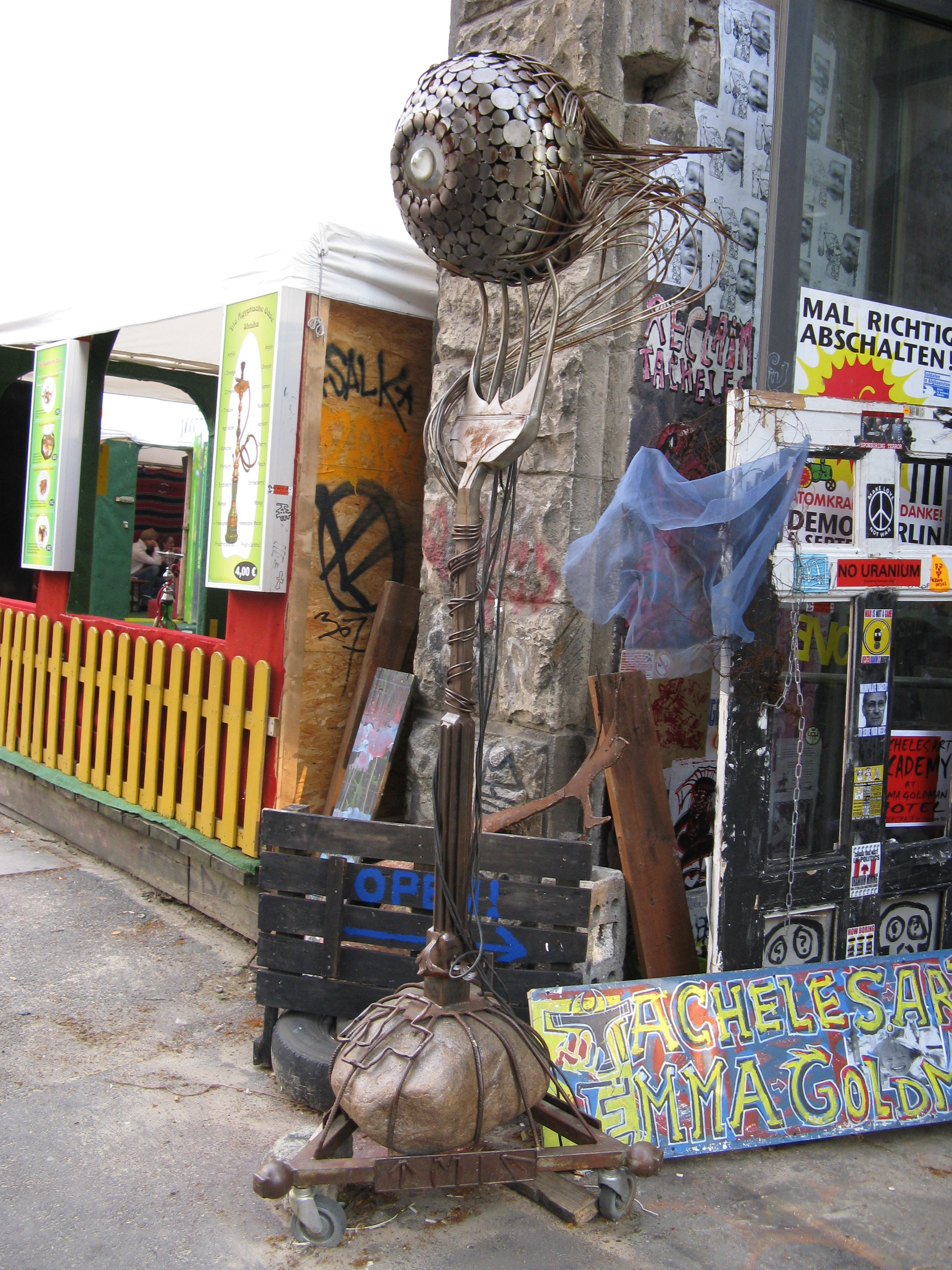

== See also ==
- Art commune
- Social center
- Rote Flora
