= Jochen Sandig =

Jochen Sandig (born 5 January 1968 in Esslingen) is a German cultural entrepreneur, dramaturg, and founder of several cultural institutions in Berlin. He served as artistic director of the Ludwigsburger Schlossfestspiele from 2020 to 2024, where he shaped the festival’s programmatic focus on democracy, sustainability, and participatory culture.

== Biography ==
Jochen Sandig has lived in Berlin since 1989. In 1990, he was involved in the founding of the Kunsthaus Tacheles. From 1990 to 1994, he was chairman of the board of Tacheles e.V. and was responsible for financing, operations, and the artistic programme.

In 1993, together with Sasha Waltz, he founded the international dance company Sasha Waltz & Guests. In 1996, he founded the Sophiensaele in Berlin as a production venue for independent theatre and dance, serving as artistic director until 1999.

In 1999, Sandig joined the artistic leadership of the Schaubühne together with Sasha Waltz, where he worked until 2004. In 2006, together with music manager Folkert Uhde, he founded the cultural institution Radialsystem V in Berlin, which opened in September 2006.

In January 2010, Sandig was appointed Chevalier dans l'Ordre des Arts et des Lettres (Knight of the Order of Arts and Letters).

Sandig and his wife, Sasha Waltz, have two children.
