= Ákos Hargitai =

Ákos Hargitai (born 1964 in Budapest), since 1990, danced in the field of contemporary dance with various local Hungarian dance groups such as Gyula Berger Dance Company, Artus, choreographer Katalin Lõrinc and in collaboration with Réka Szabó and Eszter Gál.

In Vienna he worked with Cie Willi Dorner, TanzHotel, Tanz Atelier Wien, Mark Tompkins among others.

He worked with Dance Energy / Micha Purucker (D), with David Zambrano (NL) in the Ballroom Project in NYC. He has been a member of the Berlin-based Sasha Waltz & Guests from 1994 to 1998 internationally touring with Travelogue I and II.

His appearance in musicals include: Singin' in the Rain, Cats, West Side Story or a film by Menahem Golan: Mack the Knife.

Ákos Hargitay has been teaching dance at Anton Bruckner Private University Linz, SEAD Salzburg, TQW, Cie. Willi Dorner, Orkesztika Alapitvany Budapest, Dance Conservatory Győr, Ballet Pécs, Workshop Foundation Budapest, L1 DanceLab Budapest. Together with Michaela Pein he has established the first weekly contact jam in Budapest in 2000.
