= Guy Braunstein =

German musician

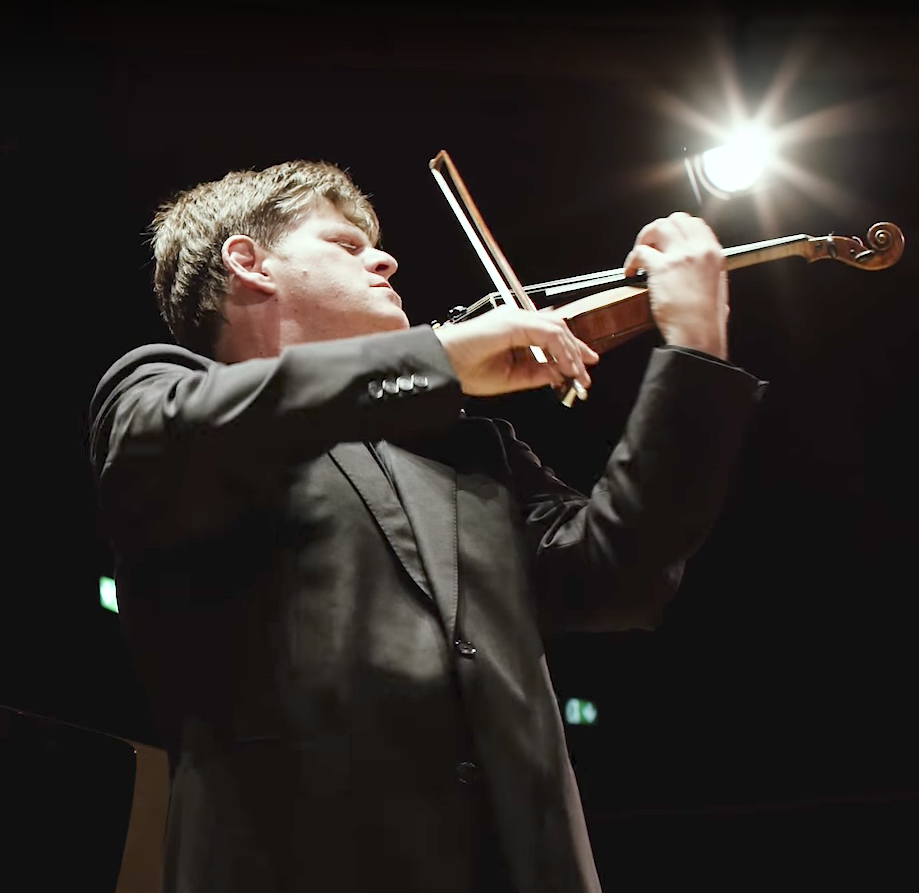
Guy Braunstein, 2018

Guy Braunstein (Hebrew: גיא בראוןשטין; born 1971) is an Israeli-American composer, conductor and classical violinist.

Born in Tel Aviv, Israel, he began to study the violin at age seven. In Israel he studied under the guidance of Valeria Blotner and Haim Taub. In the United States under the guidance of Glenn Dicterow and Pinchas Zukerman.

Braunstein developed a solo and chamber music career. He performed as a soloist with leading orchestras around the world and played in many chamber music groups such as the Huberman Quartet.

In 2000 Braunstein was appointed as the concertmaster of the Berlin Philharmonic Orchestra. Before receiving this position Braunstein played only as a soloist and as a chamber music violinist, and never played in an orchestra. However, the orchestra members unanimously elected him as the Concertmaster.

In 2003 Braunstein became professor of music at the Berlin University of the Arts (UDK) and taught there until 2007.

Braunstein was involved in re-establishing the Rolandseck Festival in Germany which was closed several years before. Until 2016, he was the Music Director of the festival together with Ohad Ben-Ari

Braunstein has appeared in various music festivals worldwide, including Chamber Music Festival in Jerusalem founded by Elena Bashkirova in 2009.

In 2013, Braunstein left the Berlin Philharmonic in order to concentrate on a solo career.
