= Sophiensæle =

Berlin

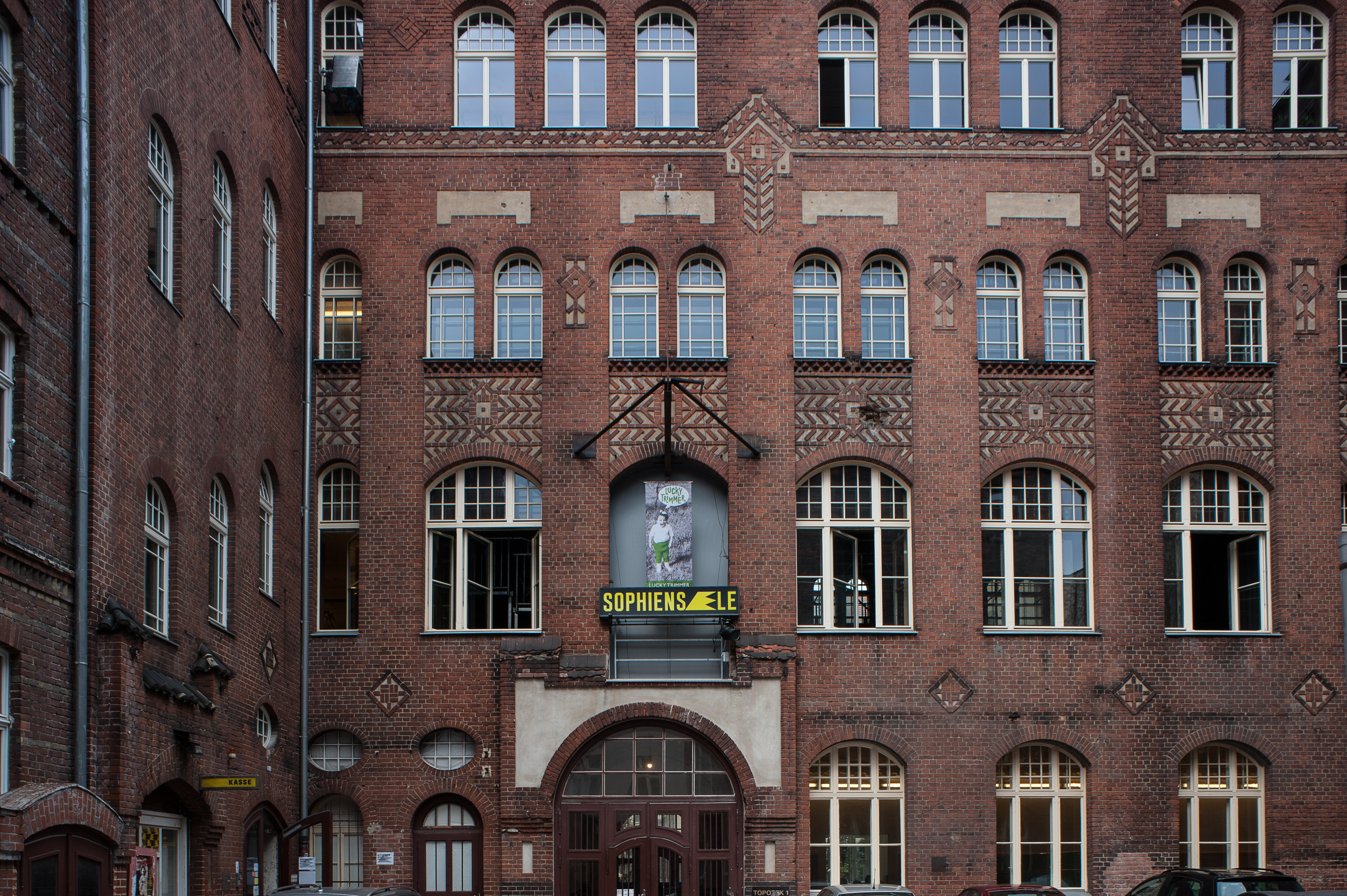
- Facade of the Sophiensæle, as viewed from the inner courtyard
- Interactive map of Sophiensæle
- Address: Sophienstraße 18, 10178; Berlin; Germany
- Coordinates: 52.52594°N 13.40156°E

Construction
- Opened: 1996

Website
- sophiensaele.com

The Sophiensæle (also occasionally spelled as Sophiensäle or Sophiensaele) is a venue for independent performance, theater, and dance, in Berlin, Germany. It is located in the courtyard of Sophienstraße 18, in the Berlin district of Mitte.

== History ==
The Sophiensæle was founded in 1996 by Sasha Waltz, Jochen Sandig, Jo Fabian, Zebu Kluth, and Dirk Cieslak.

The first performances took place the same year, beginning with the play Durchgehend Geöffnet by Dirk Cieslak and Armin Dallapiccola, in February and March. The official opening of the Sophiensæle followed on September 26, 1996 with the premiere of Sasha Waltz’s production Allee der Kosmonauten.

In 2011, the Sophiensæle’s premises and the surrounding building were renovated, mostly through the support of funds from the German Lottery Foundation. The venue reopened on December 2, 2011. The Sophiensæle currently occupies three main rooms in the building: the ballroom (Festsaal), the wedding hall (Hochzeitssaal) and the canteen (Kantine).

Amelie Deuflhard was artistic director of the venue until 2007, followed by Heike Albrecht from 2007 to 2010. At the end of 2011, Franziska Werner took over the artistic direction, and in 2023, Jens Hillje und Andrea Niederbuchner took on this position as a shared role.

The site of the Sophiensæle was originally the Handwerkervereinshaus — the house of the craftspersons’ association — and as a result was a site that was connected to significant political events in German history. For example, it was the location where Karl Liebknecht appealed to the workers of Berlin to join the 1918 German Revolution. Then, from 1950 to 1990, the location served as a theater workshop for the Maxim Gorki Theater. The building is a protected monument.

== Programming ==
Since its founding in 1996, the Sophiensæle has been a central production location for independent theater, performance, and dance in Germany. It is currently one of the most significant venues for independent theater in the German-speaking world, and an anchor institution for the independent artistic scene in Berlin.

Artists from the local, national, and international scene are invited to produce and present their work at Sophiensæle, with the venue providing support in applying for funding, finding co-production partners, and in press and public relations work. In some cases, the venue also takes over production management.

Around 90 productions and several festivals are presented in the Sophiensæle each year. This includes theater, dance, performance, music, discussions, and presentations in various experimental or speculative formats.

== Related articles ==
- Culture in Berlin
