= Radialsystem V =

Cultural venue in Berlin, Germany

Coordinates: 52°30′37″N 13°25′44″E

Radialsystem
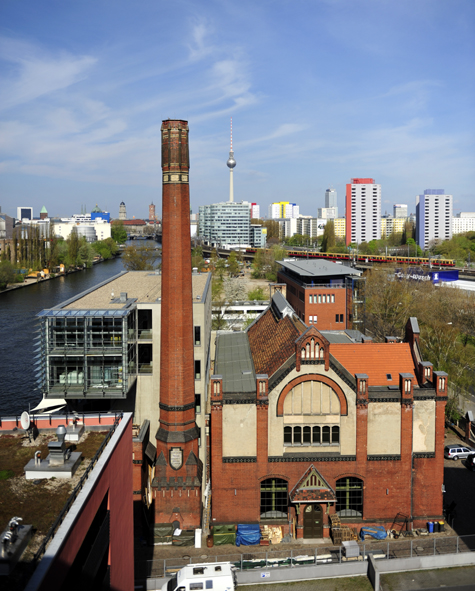
- Radialsystem on the banks of the River Spree
- Interactive map of Radialsystem
- Former names: Radialsystem V
- Address: Holzmarktstraße 33; Berlin; Germany

Construction
- Opened: 2006
- Architect: Gerhard Spangenberg (conversion)

Website
- www.radialsystem.de

Radialsystem (formerly Radialsystem V) is a cultural venue in Berlin, Germany. Located in the Friedrichshain district on the banks of the Spree, it opened in 2006 in a former industrial pumping station.

== History ==
The building was originally constructed as Pumping Station V (Pumpstation V) as part of Berlin’s historic sewerage system, entering operation in 1881. After the end of its industrial use, the structure was redeveloped for cultural use and reopened in 2006.

The conversion of the building into a cultural venue combined the preserved industrial structure with a modern architectural extension designed by Gerhard Spangenberg.

=== Acquisition by the State of Berlin ===
In 2018, the State of Berlin acquired the Radialsystem property following negotiations with its owners. The Berliner Morgenpost explained that the primary intention of the purchase was to secure the venue’s long-term future as a cultural institution for the city. The primary aim of the purchase was to prevent it from being acquired by commercial developers amid a real estate boom that was driving up property values across Berlin.

== Use as a cultural venue ==
Radialsystem has been used for performances and events since its opening days. The main focus of the venue is to present and promote contemporary dance, music, and interdisciplinary arts including contemporary dance for children.

The venue has hosted productions by Sasha Waltz & Guests.

In a 2023 interview with The New York Times, Sasha Waltz described Radialsystem as an interdisciplinary arts space intended to bridge classical and contemporary performance practices and to support the development of new work in contemporary dance.

Radialsystem has also been discussed in German newspaper coverage in relation to Berlin’s cultural infrastructure and the independent performing arts scene.

== Architecture ==
In 2004, the German Architect Gerhard Spangenberg submitted a proposal to renovate and revitalize the building, and became the project lead for Radialsystem V GmbH.

Radialsystem consists of a preserved industrial brick building combined with a contemporary extension. The redevelopment adapted the former pumping station for cultural use while retaining elements of its original industrial structure.

The building is part of a broader pattern of adaptive reuse of industrial heritage sites in Berlin.

== Sources ==
- “Zwischen Kiez und Kies”, Süddeutsche Zeitung, 24 August 2006.
- “Den Tiger reiten”, Sandra Luzina, Der Tagesspiegel, 2 September 2007.
- “Pumpwerk der Gefühle”, Frederik Hanssen, Der Tagesspiegel, 10 September 2009.
- “Wir sind der erste Kulturort nach dem BER”, Franziska Buhre, taz, 3 September 2016.
- “Mehr Dialog als Umarmung”, Astrid Kaminski, taz, 31 August 2020.
- “Diese neuen Berliner Theater sollten Sie kennen”, Berliner Morgenpost, 19 August 2016.
- *The New York Times*, 2022 feature on Sasha Waltz & Radialsystem.
