= Rongwrong =

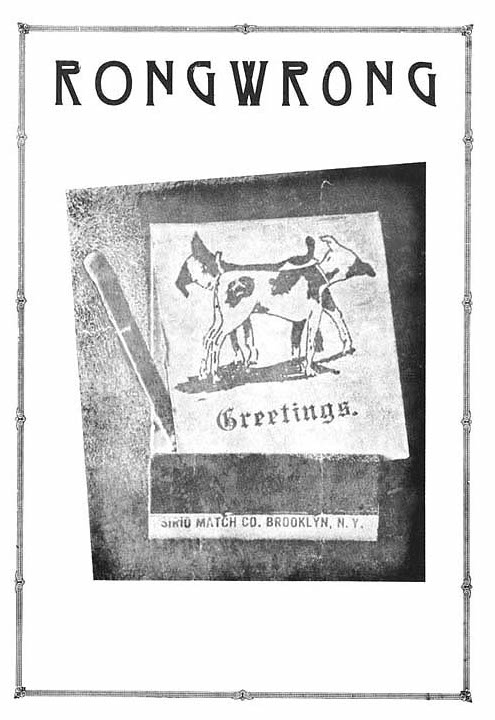
Title page of Duchamp, Roché, and Wood's 1917 Dadaist magazine Rongwrong

Rongwrong was a New York Dadaist magazine of which one issue was published in May 1917. The magazine was co-created and edited by Marcel Duchamp, Henri-Pierre Roché, and Beatrice Wood.

== History ==
In May 1917, Henri-Pierre Roché played and lost a chess game against Francis Picabia over which the two had wagered the continuation of their respective New York-based Dadaist magazines (Roché's The Blind Man and Picabia's 391). Forced to discontinue The Blind Man as a result of his losing the chess match, Roché launched Rongwrong alongside co-editors Marcel Duchamp and Beatrice Wood, and published just one issue of the magazine. Duchamp had wanted to name the magazine "Wrongwrong", but the title was misprinted as "Rongwrong", and in true Dada fashion they accepted the mistake as the official title of their magazine.

The one issue of Rongwrong included contributions by:

- Francis Picabia (poem titled "Plafonds Creux")
- Marquis de la Torre (poem titled "Une Nuit Chinoise a New York")
- Edith Clifford Williams (image of her tactile sculpture titled "Plâtre à toucher chez de Zayas")
- Carl Van Vechten (comedic dialogue titled "Rondes de Printemps", taking place between two characters named Elle and Lui; essay titled "Pour Amuser Rich")
- John Covert (painting titled "Temptation of St. Anthony")
- Henry J. Vernot (poem titled "À Cette Heure-La...")
- Bob Brown (quote, "A man is judged by the money he keeps")
- Allen Norton (quote, "Men may come and men may go//But women go on forever.")
- H.F. (pair of poems, one visual and one written, titled "Portrait de M. et R. ensemble")
- Michio Itō (program of nine dances accompanied by brief descriptions; illustration of his pictorial muse Miss Tulle Lindahl)

Rongwrong also included the following works produced by the editors:

- A letter signed "Marcel Douxami" and dated May 5, 1917, in which the author (presumably Marcel Duchamp and friends, using a humorous pseudonym) insults Picabia and muses about mechanical metaphors and double meanings present in Duchamp's previous works, including The Green Box and The Large Glass.
- The chess game between Roché and Picabia that resulted in the discontinuation of The Blind Man.
