= The Chips Are Down =

"The Chips Are Down" is a French idiom used in cards, roughly meaning 'the plays are made'. It may also refer to:

- The Chips Are Down (screenplay) (Les jeux sont faits), a screenplay by Jean-Paul Sartre
- Les jeux sont faits (film), the 1947 French drama of the same name, based on the screenplay
- "The Chips Are Down", an episode of the French animated television series Code Lyoko
