= Mina Loy =

British writer and designer of lamps (1882–1966)

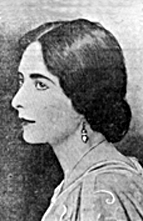
- Mina Loy in 1917
- Born: Mina Gertrude Löwy; 27 December 1882; London, England
- Died: 25 September 1966 (aged 83); Aspen, Colorado, US
- Occupations: Writer; poet; playwright; novelist; actress; designer; painter
- Movement: Modernism, Futurism, Dadaism, Surrealism
- Spouse(s): Stephen Haweis (1903 - divorced 1917, separated years beforehand), Arthur Cravan (25 January 1918 -)
- Children: 4

Mina Loy (born Mina Gertrude Löwy; 27 December 1882 – 25 September 1966) was a British artist, writer, poet, playwright, novelist, painter, designer of lamps, and bohemian. She was one of the last of the first-generation modernists to achieve posthumous recognition. Her poetry was admired by T. S. Eliot, Ezra Pound, William Carlos Williams, Basil Bunting, Gertrude Stein, Francis Picabia, and Yvor Winters, among others.

== Biography ==
=== Early life and education ===
Loy was born in Hampstead, London. She was the daughter of a Hungarian Jewish tailor, Sigmund Felix Löwy, who had moved to London to evade persistent antisemitism in Budapest, and an English Protestant mother, Julia Bryan. Loy reflected on their relationship and the production of her identity, in great detail in her mock-epic Anglo-Mongrels and the Rose (1923–1925). The marriage of Löwy and Bryan was fraught. Unknown to Loy, as biographer Carolyn Burke records, her mother married her father under the pressure of disgrace because she was already seven months pregnant with the child that would be Mina. This situation was mirrored later in Loy's life when she rushed into a marriage with Stephen Haweis after becoming pregnant out of wedlock. Löwy and Bryan had three daughters in total, with Mina being the oldest.

In much of her poetry and writing, Loy describes her mother as overbearingly Evangelical Victorian. As Burke records: "Like most Evangelicals, for whom the imagination was a source of sin, Julia distrusted her child's ability to invent." In reference to her mother, Loy recalled that she was troubled by the fact of "the very author of my being, being author of my fear." Loy found it hard to identify with her mother, who not only punished her continually for her "sinfulness", but also espoused fervent support of the British Empire, rampant antisemitism (which included her husband), and nationalistic jingoism.

Loy's formal art education began late in 1897 at St. John's Wood School where she remained for about two years. She later called it "the worst art school in London" and "a haven of disappointment". Loy's father pushed for her to go to the art school in the hope that it would make her more marriageable. Around this time, Loy became fascinated with both Dante Gabriel Rossetti and Christina Rossetti, and after much pleading, was able to persuade her father to purchase her Dante's Complete Works and reproductions of his paintings as well as a red Moroccan leather-bound version of Christina's poems. She also became passionate about the Pre-Raphaelites, beginning with the work of William Morris and later turning to Edward Burne-Jones (her favourite work of which, at the time, was Love Among the Ruins). Loy had to be careful as to how she expressed herself due to her mother's control. For example, Loy described that when her mother found a drawing she had done of the naked Andromeda bound to a rock her mother, scandalised and disgusted, tore up the work and called her daughter "a vicious slut".

=== Studies in Germany and Paris ===
In 1900, Loy attended the Munich Künstlerinnenverein, or the Society of Female Artists' School, which was connected with the Academy of Fine Arts, Munich. It was there that she claimed she learned draughtsmanship.

Upon returning from the relative freedom she found in Munich to the stifling environment of her family home in London, Loy suffered from "headaches, respiratory problems, and generalized weakness", which was then diagnosed as neurasthenia – "a catch-all term for a variety of psychosomatic complaints suffered by artistic or intellectual women and a few sensitive men" during that time period.

Around the age of eighteen, Loy convinced her parents to allow her to continue her education in Paris with a chaperone – a woman called Mrs. Knight. After much persuasion, she was allowed to move to Montparnasse, which in 1902 had not yet been urbanised, and attend the Académie Colarossi as an art student. Unlike the segregated classes at the Munich Künstlerinnenverein, these art classes were mixed. It was here, through an English friend of a similar social standing named Madeline Boles, that Loy first came into contact with the English painter Stephen Haweis, whom Loy later described as enacting the "parasitic drawing-out of one's vitality to recharge, as it were, his own deficient battery of life." According to Burke's biography, Haweis was unpopular with his fellow students, being considered a "poseur," and Boles in particular took him under her wing. Haweis, whose father was the well-known Reverend Hugh Reginald Haweis and his mother Mary Eliza Haweis, a writer who wrote, amongst other things, Chaucer for Children: A Golden Key, was an aesthete of sorts and "despite being very short[,] he managed to condescend to his listeners from a height." He began to exert himself over Loy, recognising her beauty and desirability, and played the role of the misunderstood eccentric, which led Loy to feel guilty for disliking him and distrusting him as he borrowed more and more money from her without paying her back. Later, she would reflect that Haweis loomed over her and she became, in Loy's own words, "as sullenly involved as with my mother's sadistic hysterics." One night, he convinced her to stay over and, in what she would later describe as a state of hypnosis, she was seduced by him. Waking up the next morning in his bed, semi-naked, Loy was horrified and repulsed.

A few months after this, she realised that she was pregnant, something which terrified her as it bound her, as she later described, even closer to "the being on earth whom she would have least chosen." Being only twenty-one, she faced a difficult situation and, fearing rejection from her family and disinheritance, which would leave her penniless, she sought her parents' approval to marry Haweis, which they agreed to due to his respectable social status as the son of a preacher. Reflecting on this in later life, and how her upbringing influenced her in the decisions she made, Loy remarked that "If anyone I disliked insisted upon my doing anything I was averse to I would automatically comply, so systematically had they obfuscated my instinct of self-preservation."

=== Paris, 1903–1906 ===
Relocating to Paris, Haweis and Loy married there, in the 14th Arrondissement, on 13 December 1903 – Loy was twenty-one, and four months pregnant. Initially they agreed that it would be just a marriage of convenience, but Stephen quickly became more possessive and demanding. Instead of taking her husband's name, after their marriage, she changed her last name from "Lowy" to "Loy." Becoming Modern: The Life of Mina Loy (1996) biographer Carolyn Burke notes that "[t]he anagrammatic shifts of Lowy into Loy and later Lloyd symbolize her attempts to resolve personal crises and chooses to refer to Loy as Mina – the name that stayed fixed as her surname varied."

Starting in 1903 until 1904, after meeting the Englishman Henry Coles, Haweis began selling photographies d'art, or fine art photography pieces, influenced by Art Nouveau style. The most notable commission of this time was the photographing of the recent works of Auguste Rodin, which came about after Haweis met with Rodin himself. At that time, Loy was Haweis's favourite subject to photograph; this is something which Loy never commented on. As Haweis gained more contacts and work, Loy became increasingly isolated and heavily pregnant.

Loy's first child, Oda, was born on 27 May 1903. The labour was hard, as recalled in the early poem "Parturition" (first published in The Trend 8:1, October 1914). The opening details:

I am the centre
Of a circle of pain
Exceeding its boundaries in every direction
The business of the bland sun
Has no affair with me
In my congested cosmos of agony
From which there is no escape [...]

Whilst Loy was in labour through the night, Haweis was absent with his mistress. Loy records this in "Parturition" thus:

The irresponsibility of the male
Leaves woman her superior Inferiority.
He is running upstairs

Two days after her first birthday, Oda died of meningitis, and Loy was left completely bereft with grief over the loss. A day or so after Oda's death Loy reportedly painted a (now lost) tempera painting The Wooden Mother in which she depicted two mothers with their children, one being a "foolish-looking mother holding her baby, whose small fingers are raised in an impotent blessing over the other anguished mother who, on her knees, curses them both with great, upraised, clenched fists, and her own baby sprawling dead with little arms and legs outstretched lifeless."

Loy decided to enter the Salon d'Automne under the name "Mina Loy" (having dropped the "w" in Lowy) in 1905. That autumn, she exhibited six watercolours, and the following spring she exhibited two watercolours at the Salon des Beaux-Arts of 1906. After the latter exhibition, Loy was written of favourably in the Gazette des Beaux-Arts:

Mlle Mina Loy who, in her uncommon watercolours, where Guys, Rops and Beardsley are combined, shows us ambiguous ephebes whose nudity is caressed by ladies dressed in furbelows of 1855.

After this positive reception, Loy was asked to become a sociétaire of the drawing category, which meant that her work could be exhibited without having to pass through a selection committee. This was a "vote of confidence" which, as biographer Burke recognises, "was an exceptional mark of recognition for an unknown Englishwoman of twenty-three".

By 1906, Loy and Haweis had agreed to live separately. During this period of separation, Loy was treated by a French doctor named Henry Joël le Savoureux for neurasthenia, which had worsened with the death of Oda and living with Haweis, and the pair embarked on an affair, which would end with her becoming pregnant. This made Haweis jealous and precipitated their move to Florence, where there were fewer people who knew them.

=== Florence, 1906–1916 ===
At first, Loy and Haweis moved into a villino located in Arcetri, finding themselves in a large expatriate community. In the Spring of 1907, Haweis found a studio on the Costa San Giorgio in Oltrarno.

On 20 July 1907, Loy gave birth to Joella Sinara. A few months before Joella's first birthday, Loy was pregnant again, this time with the child of Haweis, and she was to give birth to a son named John Stephen Giles Musgrove Haweis on 1 February 1909.

Joella was late learning to walk, which was later diagnosed as a type of infantile paralysis which caused her muscles to atrophy. Dreading that Joella's condition might be like the meningitis that killed Oda, Loy sought medical and spiritual support. This was one of her earliest, critical encounters with Christian Science as she sought out a practitioner, who prescribed a treatment and told Loy to feed Joella beef broth and donkey's milk. After this succeeded in improving Joella's health, Loy began to attend church regularly.

Around 1909, with the financial support of Loy's father, Loy and Haweis moved into a three-storey home on the Costa San Giorgio. The family had a nurse, Giulia, who helped raise the children and would later spend years being the children's sole support, and her sister Estere, who was the family cook. Once the children were toddlers, Loy spent increasingly less time with them, and they were often cared for in the cooler climate of the mountains and Forte de Marmi in the summers. Burke speculates that this may have been a reaction to the overbearing intrusion of her own mother, which led her to withdraw.

Loy frequented the social gatherings held by socialite Mabel Dodge Luhan at the Villa Curonia, and it was here that she met Gertrude Stein, her brother Leo Stein, and Alice B. Toklas. Loy was drawn to Gertrude and even got the opportunity to dine with her, Dodge, and Andre Gide. Gertrude would later recall that Loy, as well as Haweis, were amongst the few at that time who expressed serious interest in her work (she had not yet been widely recognised for her literary achievement). However, Gertrude recalls an incident where Haweis begged her to add two commas in exchange for a painting, which she did, but then later removed them; contrarily, Gertrude noted that "Mina Loy equally interested was able to understand without the commas. She has always been able to understand."

In daughter Joella (née Sinara) Bayer's memoir, now part of the Mina Loy Estate, she reflected on her parents, saying:

My mother, tall, willowy, extraordinarily beautiful, very talented, undisciplined, a free spirit, with the beginning of too strong an ego; my father, short, dark, a mediocre painter, bad tempered, with charming social manners and endless conversation about the importance of his family.

According to Gillian Hanscombe and Virginia L. Smyers:

During their ten years in Florence, both Mina and Haweis took lovers and developed their separate lives. In 1913 and 1914, though she was coping with motherhood, a soured marriage, lovers, and her own artistic aspirations, Mina found time to notice and take part in the emerging Italian Futurist movement, led by Filippo Marinetti, whom Loy had a brief affair with, and to read Stein's manuscript: The Making of Americans. Loy even showed some of her own art at the first Free Futurist International Exhibition in Rome. She became, also, at this time, a lifelong convert to Christian Science.

In winter 1913, at Caffe Giubbe Rosse (an informal meeting place of those involved in Giovanni Papini's Lacerba) Loy's lodger friend and fellow artist, the American Frances Simpson Stevens, met Florentine artists Carlo Carrà and Ardengo Soffici, who, with Papini, had joined forces with Marinetti's Futurists earlier that year. They soon began visiting Stevens on the Costa San Giorgio, and through this connection, Stevens and Loy met many other Italian artists. Soffici would later invite Loy and Stevens to exhibit their work in the First Free Futurist International Exhibition, to be held in Rome at the Sprovieri Gallery – Loy was the only artist representing Britain and Stevens the only North American.

From 1914 until her departure for America in 1916, Loy was involved in a complicated love triangle between Papini and Marinetti – which she was to write about extensively in her poetry.

In 1914, while living in an expatriate community in Florence, Italy, Loy wrote her Feminist Manifesto. A galvanising polemic against the subordinate position of women in society, the short text remained unpublished in Loy's lifetime.

=== New York, 1916 ===
Disillusioned with the macho and destructive elements in Futurism, as well as craving independence and participation in a modernist art community, Loy left her children and moved to New York in the winter of 1916. Before arriving in New York, Loy had already created a stir – most notably with the 1915 publication of her Love Songs in the first edition of Others. She became a key figure in the group that formed around Others magazine, which also included Man Ray, William Carlos Williams, Marcel Duchamp, and Marianne Moore. Loy soon became a well-known member of the Greenwich Village bohemian circuit. Frances Stevens, who had stayed with Loy previously in Florence, helped Loy get a small apartment on West Fifty-seventh Street. Within days of being in New York, Stevens took Loy to an evening gathering at Walter and Louise Arensberg's 33 West Sixty-seventh Street duplex apartment.

As Loy's biographer Carolyn Burke describes:

'On any given evening the Arensbergs’ guests might include Duchamp’s friends from Paris: the painters Albert Gleizes; his wife, Juliette Roche; Jean and Yvonne Crotti; and Francis Picabia, as well as his wife, Gabrielle Buffet-Picabia; the composer Edgard Varèse; and the novelist and diplomat Henri-Pierre Roché. The new figures in American art and letters were also represented: at various times the salon attracted the artists Man Ray, Beatrice Wood, Charles Sheeler, Katherine Dreier, Charles Demuth, Clara Tice, and Frances Stevens, as well as poets Wallace Stevens, Alfred Kreymborg, William Carlos Williams, writers Allen and Louise Norton and Bob Brown, and art critic Henry McBride. And then there was the Baroness Elsa von Freytag-Loringhoven – artist’s model, poet, and ultra-eccentric.'

Early in 1917, Loy starred alongside William Carlos Williams, as wife and husband, in Alfred Kreymborg's one-act play Lima Beans produced by the Provincetown Players.

Loy contributed a (since lost) painting entitled Making Lampshades to the first exhibition of the Society of Independent Artists (formed in December 1916) at the Grand Central Palace, New York, which opened on 10 April 1917. With Walter Arensberg acting as the director and Marcel Duchamp as the head of the hanging committee, the show broke new ground in America as they ran with the slogan 'No jury, no prizes' as well as flouting tradition by displaying art works alphabetically, with no regard to reputation, and allowing anyone to enter for the price of $6.

In 1917 she met the "poet-boxer" Arthur Cravan, a nephew of Oscar Wilde's wife, Constance Lloyd. Cravan fled to Mexico to avoid the draft; when Loy's divorce was final, she followed him, and they married in Mexico City in 1918. Here they lived in poverty, and years later, Loy would write of their destitution.

When she found out that she was pregnant, she travelled on a hospital ship to Buenos Aires, "where she intended to wait for Cravan, but Cravan never appeared, nor was he ever seen again". Reportedly, "Cravan disappeared while testing a boat he planned to escape in. He was presumed drowned, but reported sightings continued to haunt Loy for the rest of her life." Cravan was lost at sea without trace; although some mistakenly claim that his body was found later in the desert (post-mortem, his life acquired even more epic proportions and dozens of stories proliferated). The tale of Cravan's disappearance is strongly anecdotal, as recounted by Loy's biographer, Carolyn Burke. Their daughter, Fabienne, was born in April 1919 in England.

In a chapter of her largely unpublished memoir entitled Colossus, Loy writes about her relationship with Cravan, who was introduced to her as "the prizefighter who writes poetry." Irene Gammel argues that their relationship was "located at the heart of avant-garde activities [which included boxing and poetry]." Loy draws on the language of boxing throughout her memoir to define the terms of her relationship with Cravan.

=== Return to Europe and New York ===
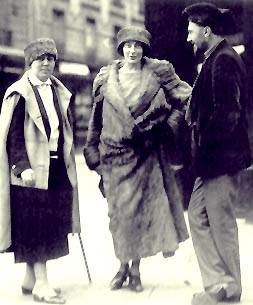
Loy (centre) with Jane Heap and Ezra Pound in Paris, c. 1923

After Cravan's death/disappearance, Loy travelled back to England, where she gave birth to her daughter, Fabienne. Loy would return to Florence and her other children. However, in 1916 she moved to New York, arriving on 15 October on the ship Duca D 'Aosta, which set sail from the port of Naples. While in New York, she worked in a lamp-shade studio, as well as acting in the Provincetown Theater. Here, she returned to her old Greenwich Village life, engaging in theatre or mixing with her fellow writers. During this period, some of Loy's poems ended up in small magazines such as Little Review and Dial. She would mingle and develop friendships with the likes of Ezra Pound, Dadaist Tristan Tzara, and Jane Heap. Loy contributed writing to Marcel Duchamp's two editions of the journal The Blind Man.

Appearing to be somewhat mystified by the new kinds of poetry being produced by Loy and her ilk, Pound remarked in a March 1918 piece for Little Review, "In the verse of Marianne Moore I detect traces of emotion; in that of Mina Loy I detect no emotion whatsoever", seeing them both as demonstrating logopoeia, the writing of poetry without caring for its music or imagism. Instead, in their poetry, they performed "a dance of the intelligence among words and ideas and modification of ideas and characters." Pound concludes, "The point of my praise, for I intend this as praise...is that without any pretences and without clamours about nationality, these girls have written a distinctly national product, they have written something which would not have come out of any other country, and (while I have before now seen a great deal of rubbish by both of them) they are, as selected by Mr. Kreymborg, interesting and readable (by me...)."

Loy travelled back to Florence, then New York, then back to Florence, "provoked by the news that Haweis had moved with Giles to the Caribbean". She brought her daughters to Berlin to enrol her daughter in dance school, but left them once more because she was drawn back to Paris by the art and literature scene.

In 1923, she returned to Paris. Her first volume of poetry, Lunar Baedecker, a collection of 31 poems, was published this year and was mistakenly printed with the spelling error "Baedecker" rather than the intended "Baedeker".

=== Later Years in New York ===
In 1936, Loy returned to New York and lived for a time with her daughter in Manhattan. She moved to the Bowery, where she found inspiration for poems and found object assemblage art in the destitute people she encountered. On 15 April 1946, she became a naturalised citizen of the United States under the name "Gertrude Mina Lloyd", resident at 302 East 66 Street in New York City. Her second and last book, Lunar Baedeker & Time Tables, appeared in 1958. In 1953, Loy moved to Aspen, Colorado, where her daughters were already living; Joella, who had been married to the art dealer of Surrealism in New York, Julien Levy, next married the Bauhaus artist and typographer Herbert Bayer. She exhibited her found object art constructions in New York in 1951 and at the Bodley Gallery in 1959 in a show entitled 'Constructions' but she did not personally attend it.

=== Death ===
Loy continued to write and work on her assemblages until her death at the age of 83, on 25 September 1966 from pneumonia in Aspen, Colorado. Loy is buried in Aspen Grove Cemetery.

=== Children ===
Loy had four children; her children by Haweis were Oda Janet Haweis (1903–1904), Joella Synara Haweis Levy Bayer (1907–2004) and John Giles Stephen Musgrove Haweis (1909–1923). Her only child with Cravan was Jemima Fabienne Cravan Benedict (1919–1997). Both Oda and John Giles died prematurely—Oda at the age of one year and John Giles at fourteen.

Giles, whose father Stephen Haweis picked him up from Florence in Loy's absence and took Giles without her consent to the Caribbean, died of a rare cancerous growth at the age of fourteen having never been reunited with his mother. According to Loy biographer Burke, the loss of Giles, following as it did upon the disappearance or death of Cravan, precipitated struggles with her mental health. As a result, Loy’s daughter Joella often had to care for her and prevent her from self-harming.

== Published works ==
Consider Your Grandmother's Stays, a 1916 drawing by Mina Loy

Loy is described as a "brilliant literary enigma" by Rachel Potter and Suzanne Hobson, who outline a chronological map of her geographical and literary shifts. Loy's poetry was published in several magazines before being published in book form. The magazines that she was featured in include Camera Work, Trend, Rogue, Little Review, and Dial. Loy had two volumes of her poetry published in her lifetime: The Lunar Baedeker (1923) and The Lunar Baedeker & Time-tables (1958). The Lunar Baedeker included her most famous work, "Love Songs", in a shortened version. It also included four poems included in Others in 1915, but their sexual explicitness had provoked a violent reaction, which made it difficult to publish the rest. Posthumously, two updated volumes of her poetry were released, The Last Lunar Baedeker (Highlands, NC, Jargon Society, 1982) and The Lost Lunar Baedeker (New York, Farrar Straus Girous, 1996 and Manchester, Carcanet, 1997), both edited by Roger L. Conover. The 1997 edition omits Anglo-Mongrels and the Rose, a sequence of 21 poems, part semi-autobiographical, part social satire, arguably Loy's most accomplished work - which, as a result of this omission, remains out of print. Songs to Joannes is in both editions.

Her only novel, Insel, was published posthumously in 1991. It is about the relationship between a German artist, Insel, and an art dealer, Mrs. Jones. Some critics have suggested that the novel is based on Loy's relationship with Richard Oelze. However, Sandeep Parmar has said that it is actually about Loy's relationship with her creative self.

=== Poetry books ===
- Lunar Baedeker (Paris: Contact Publishing Co.,1923)
- Lunar Baedeker and Time-Tables (Highlands, N.C.: Jonathan Williams Publisher [Jargon 23], 1958)
- The Last Lunar Baedeker, Roger Conover ed. (Highlands: Jargon Society [Jargon 53], 1982)
- The Lost Lunar Baedeker, Roger Conover ed. (Carcanet: Manchester, 1997)

=== Published prose ===
- Insel, Elizabeth Arnold ed. (Black Sparrow Press, 1991)
- Stories and Essays, Sara Crangle ed. (Dalkey Press Archive [British Literature Series], 2011)

=== Critical exhibitions ===
- Salon d'Automne (Paris, 1905) – six watercolours
- Salon des Beaux-Arts (Paris, 1906) – two watercolours
- First Free Futurist International Exhibition (Rome, 1914)
- The New York Society of Independent Artists (Inaugural exhibition, 1917)
- Constructions at Bodley Gallery, New York (April 14 – 25th 1959; her only solo show until 2023)
- Mina Loy: Strangeness is Inevitable at Bowdoin College, Brunswick, Maine (April 6, 2023 - September 17, 2023; the first monographic presentation of the art of Mina Loy)

== Legacy ==
Loy's name may have been an inspiration for the stage name of actress Myrna Loy (born Myrna Williams); the idea apparently came from screenwriter Peter Ruric, also known as crime novelist Paul Cain.

Recently in Argentina Camila Evia has translated and prepared an edition that includes the Feminist Manifesto and many poems by Mina Loy, making her legacy known in depth throughout Latin America.

Nicholas Fox Weber wrote in the New York Times that "Mina Loy may never be more than a vaguely familiar name, a passing satellite, but at least she sparkled from an orbit of her own choosing."
