= Beatrice Wood =

American painter and studio potter

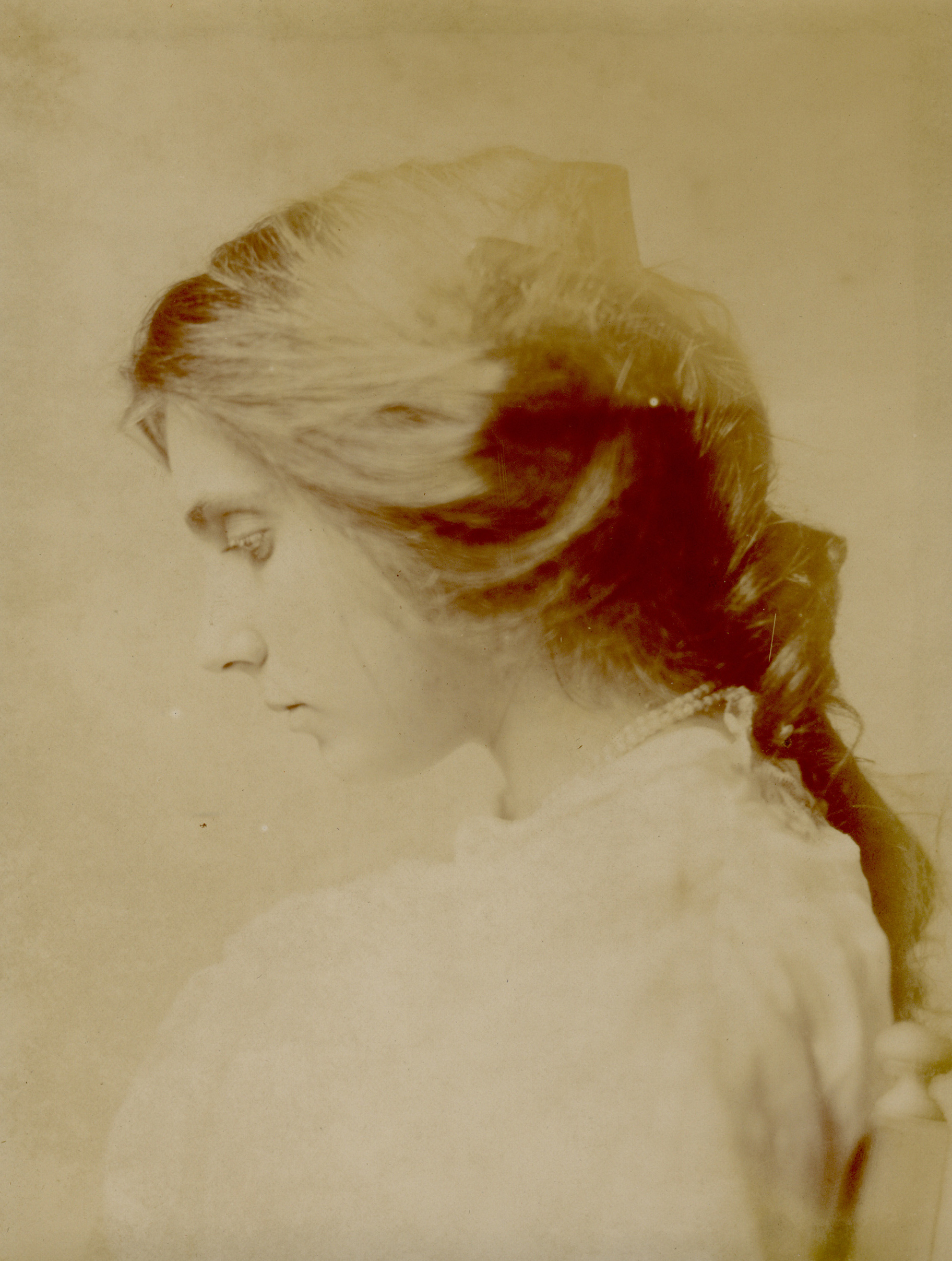
- Beatrice Wood, 1908
- Born: March 3, 1893; San Francisco, California
- Died: March 12, 1998 (aged 105); Ojai, California
- Known for: Ceramics, figure sculpture, lusterware
- Movement: Dada
- Spouses: Paul Renson (annulled), Steve Hoag (m. 1938–1960)

Untitled (Two Women) earthenware with glazes by Beatrice Wood, 1990

Beatrice Wood (March 3, 1893 – March 12, 1998) was an American artist and studio potter involved in the Dada movement in the United States; she founded and edited The Blind Man and Rongwrong magazines in New York City with French artist Marcel Duchamp and writer Henri-Pierre Roché in 1917. She had earlier studied art and theater in Paris, and was working in New York as an actress. She later worked at sculpture and pottery. Wood was characterized as the "Mama of Dada".

Wood partially inspired the character of Rose DeWitt Bukater in the 1997 film Titanic. She died nine days after her 105th birthday in Ojai, California.

== Childhood ==
Beatrice Wood was born in San Francisco, California, the daughter of wealthy socialites. After the San Francisco earthquake of 1906, the family moved to New York. Despite her parents' strong opposition, Wood insisted on pursuing a career in the arts. Eventually her parents agreed to let her study painting. Because she was fluent in French, they sent her to Paris, where she studied acting at the Comédie-Française and art at the Académie Julian.

The onset of World War I forced Wood to return to the United States. She continued acting with a French Repertory Company in New York City, performing more than sixty roles in two years. She worked for several years performing on the stage.

== Dada and the avant-garde ==
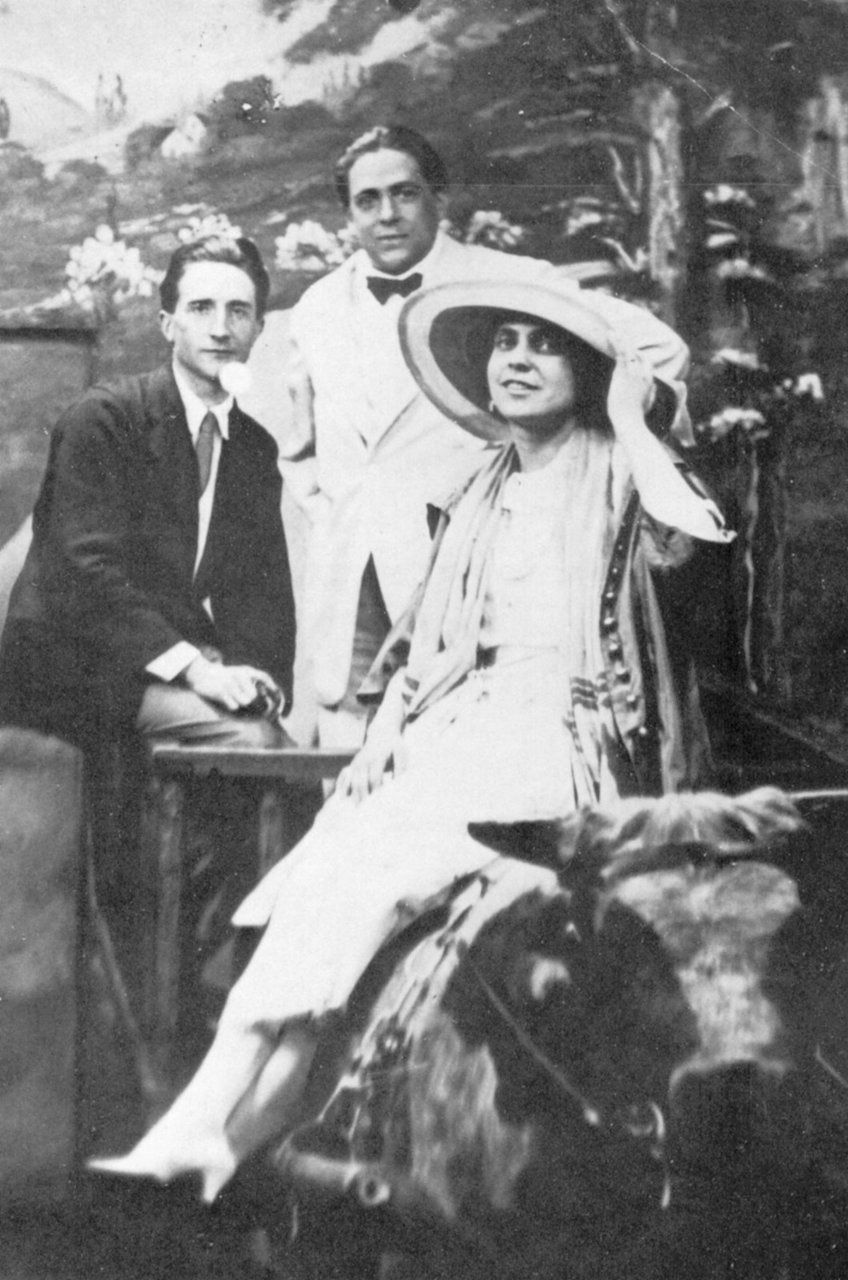
Marcel Duchamp, Francis Picabia, and Beatrice Wood at the Broadway Photo Shop, New York City, 1917

Wood's involvement in the avant-garde began with her introduction to Marcel Duchamp. He and his friend Henri-Pierre Roché, a man fourteen years her senior, met her in New York in 1916 while she was visiting the composer Edgard Varèse, who was hospitalized with a broken leg. The three worked together to create The Blind Man and subsequently Rongwrong, magazines that were two of the earliest manifestations of the Dada art movement in the United States. The publication was intended to defend the submission of a urinal by Duchamp who had submitted it under the name R. Mutt to the First Exhibition of the Society of Independent Artists in April 1917. Wood wrote the oft-quoted statement that appeared in the publication as an unsigned editorial: "As for plumbing, that is absurd. The only works of art America has given are her plumbing and her bridges." Wood also submitted to the exhibition and her piece "Un peu d'eau dans du savon", which she had made alongside Duchamp in his studio, was accepted and was displayed. The work was the image of a nude female figure rising from her bath, but because Wood attached an actual piece of soap to what she called the "tactical position", the work drew a great deal of attention and critical reaction.

=== Roché, Duchamp, and Jules et Jim ===
Though she was most involved with Roché, the two often spent time with Duchamp, creating a kind of love triangle. This was not, however, the inspiration for Roché's 1953 novel, Jules et Jim (or the 1962 film adaptation by François Truffaut). Jules et Jim was based on the triangle involving Roché, German writer Franz Hessel, and Helen Grund, who married Hessel. Roché alluded to the Wood-Roché-Duchamp triangle in his unfinished novel, Victor. Wood herself saw little resemblance between Jules et Jim and her relationship with Roché and Duchamp, writing in her 1985 autobiography, I Shock Myself:

Roché lived in Paris with his wife Denise, and had by now written Jules et Jim ... Because the story concerns two young men who are close friends and a woman who loves them both, people have wondered how much was based on Roché, Marcel, and me. I cannot say what memories or episodes inspired Roché, but the characters bear only passing resemblance to those of us in real life! (p. 136)

=== Arensbergs and their circle ===
Wood met the art patrons Walter and Louise Arensberg, who became her lifelong friends. From 1915 through 1920, they held regular gatherings at their apartment at 33 West 67th Street in Manhattan in which artists, writers, and poets were invited to gather, where they were given drinks, hors d'oeuvres, and engaged in intellectual discussions. Besides Duchamp, Roché, and her, the group included many other artists of the avant-garde: Edgard Varese, Charles Sheeler, Joseph Stella, Man Ray and Francis Picabia. Wood's relationship with these artists and others associated with the avant-garde movement of the early 20th century, earned her the designation as "Mama of Dada".

== Drawings ==
Marcel Duchamp encouraged her to draw, inviting her to use his studio as a place in which to work. She later illustrated her autobiography, I Shock Myself. She signed her early drawings "Bea", her name in French, but after taking up pottery, she signed most of her work as "Beato", her nickname. In 2014, a series of her drawings were exhibited as part of the permanent collection of the Santa Barbara Museum of Art in Santa Barbara, California

== Sculpture ==
Figures were an important part of the artist's work during the 1930s and 40s. She explored both vessel forms and sculpture throughout her career. As her skills increased, Wood consciously retained a naive, illustrative style to communicate her commentaries on life and love. She called these works her "sophisticated primitives". This approach makes clear her love of all types of non-Western folk and primitive art.

== Ceramics career ==
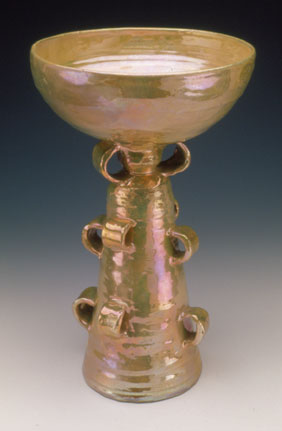
Luster Chalice by Beatrice Wood, Permanent Collection, Beatrice Wood Center for the Arts & Happy Valley Foundation

While on a trip to hear J. Krishnamurti speak in the Netherlands, Wood bought a pair of baroque plates with a luster glaze. She wanted to find a matching teapot to go along with it, but was unsuccessful. Deciding to make the teapot herself, she enrolled in a ceramic class at Hollywood High School. Throughout her long career in ceramics, she never did make the matching teapot. This hobby turned into a passion which lasted another sixty years, and she studied with a number of leading ceramists including Gertrude and Otto Natzler. Ultimately, Wood developed a signature style of glazing, an all-over, in-glaze luster that draws the metallic salts to the surface of the glaze by starving the kiln of oxygen.

=== Collections ===
Wood's work is held in the permanent collections of the Smithsonian Institution, the Metropolitan Museum of Art, the National Museum of Women in the Arts, the Brooklyn Museum, the Museum of Modern Art, among others.

== Ojai and longevity ==
In 1947, Wood felt her career was established enough for her to build a home. She settled in Ojai, California, in 1948 to be near the Indian philosopher J. Krishnamurti. She became a lifelong member of the Theosophical Society—Adyar. These associations greatly influenced her artistic philosophies. She also taught and lived on the same land as the Happy Valley School, now known as Besant Hill School.

At the age of 90, Wood became a writer, having been encouraged by her friend Anaïs Nin. Her best-known book is her autobiography, I Shock Myself (1985). When asked the secret to her longevity, she responded, "I owe it all to art books, chocolates, and young men." Wood was a lifelong vegetarian who abstained from alcohol and smoking.

== Legacy and honors ==
- In 1994, the Smithsonian Institution named Wood an "Esteemed American Artist".
- Wood left her home and studio to the Happy Valley Foundation. In 2005, the foundation asked Kevin Virgil Wallace to transform it into The Beatrice Wood Center for the Arts.

== Films inspired by Wood ==
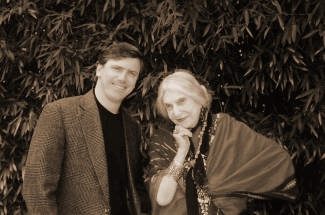
Wood (right) and Tom Neff in Ojai, 1993

- Beatrice Wood: Mama of Dada: This documentary, by film maker Tom Neff, was released as a 16 mm film in Los Angeles on March 3, 1993, to coincide with Wood's 100th birthday.
- Wood partially inspired the 101-year-old character of "Rose" in James Cameron's epic 1997 film, Titanic. According to Cameron, Bill Paxton's wife had loaned him a copy of I Shock Myself. As he started reading it, he realized that

the first chapter describes almost literally the character I was already writing for "Old Rose" ... When I met her [Beatrice Wood] she was charming, creative and devastatingly funny ... Of course, the film's Rose is only a refraction of Beatrice, combined with many fictional elements. James Cameron pays homage to her in the opening scene of his 1998 film Titanic. We see the film's heroine, 101, making ceramics, one of Beatrice Wood's favored mediums. James Cameron explains that he discovered it by reading her autobiography while preparing the film. He is enthusiastic about this rebellious and nonconformist spirit and tells the following anecdote of his interaction with Beatrice Wood: "She was a bit of the inspiration for the character of Titanic. In fact, I called her and asked her the permission to interview her and use her as a sort of model for this character, even though Beatrice had no connection to the Titanic itself. She replied, 'I can't do that, I don't - 'I'm only 35'. She was 102 at the time".

According to her obituary in the Ojai Valley News, Wood awarded the Fifth Annual Beatrice Wood Film Award to Cameron.

== Diaries ==
Beatrice Wood kept daily journals for 85 years. In 2011, Francis M. Naumann and his wife, Marie T. Keller, edited a selection of her journals involving her life in the world of art.

== Sources ==
- Wood, Beatrice; Smith, Lindsay (1992). I Shock Myself: The Autobiography of Beatrice Wood. San Francisco, Calif: Chronicle Books. ISBN 978-0-87701-498-0.
- Clark, Garth (2001). Gilded Vessel: The Lustrous Life and Art of Beatrice Wood. Guild Publishing.
- Wallace, Marlene (1994). Playing Chess With the Heart: Beatrice Wood at 100. San Francisco, Calif: Chronicle Books.
- "Beatrice Wood". New Mexico Museum of Art.

== Other ==
- Cameron, James. Titanic: James Cameron's Illustrated Screenplay. New York, Harper: 1998.
- Laskas, Jeanne Marie. "Beatrice Wood: Breaking the Mold", in We Remember: Women Born at the Turn of the Century Tell the Stories of Their Lives in Words and Pictures. New York: William Morrow and Co., 1999.
