= Edith Williams (disambiguation) =

Edith Williams (1899–1979) was a Canadian veterinarian.

Edith Williams may also refer to:

- Edith Clifford Williams (1885–1971), pioneer in the American abstract art movement
- Edith L. Williams (1887–1987), US Virgin Islands educator and suffragist
- Edith Derby Williams (1917–2008), Roosevelt family member and conservationist historian
