= Allen Norton =

American writer

Allen Norton (1878?-1945?) was an American poet and literary editor of the 1910s and 20s. His father, E.L. Norton, was a stock broker. He went to Harvard, where he specialized in literature and began writing poetry. He and his wife Louise Norton edited the little magazine Rogue, published from March 1915 to December 1916. The periodical, partly financed by Walter Conrad Arensberg, served as an early showcase for the work of Arensberg himself, Wallace Stevens, Mina Loy, and Alfred Kreymborg. Norton's 1914 volume of verse, Saloon Sonnets With Sunday Flutings, was published by Donald Evan's Claire Marie Press. Heavily influenced by fin-de-siècle aestheticism, Alice Corbin Henderson remarked that his work, along with the poetry of Evans himself, represented something of a revival of that style. Poems in the volume included Impressions of Oscar Wilde, Modern Love and Mrs. Eddy: a Mask.

Allen Norton and his wife Louise had a son, Michael, born in 1912, but the couple became estranged by 1917 and divorced shortly thereafter. In the 1920s, Norton married a woman named Adele Baker, an actress, but that marriage, too, ended in divorce. In 1944 he met Marion Phillip, a merchandising consultant, and they moved to the Baker family farm in Monmouth County, Pennsylvania. From that location he suddenly and inexplicably disappeared on January 3, 1945, but his bones were found in 1951 and forensically matched to his identity.
