= Feminist Manifesto =

Manifesto by Modernist poet Mina Loy

Feminist Manifesto was written in 1914 by English-born Modernist writer Mina Loy (December 27, 1882 – September 25, 1966), but not published until 1982 by The Last Lunar Baedeker. The text inspires a call to action for women to critique the feminist movement in the 20th century, while designing an agenda to secure women's identity within the changing spheres of society. This action is attained by casting out traditional roles and demolishing the distinction between the two sexes. The manifesto is dependent on political and rational involvement.

== Historical and literary context ==
Loy wrote Feminist Manifesto in 1914, while living in an expatriate community in Florence, Italy. The Great War was underway, and lasted from 1914 until 1918, resulting in a huge disruption in social and economic values. Women were required to enter the workforce as a substitution for the men who were away at war. As the war came to an end, Parliament voted in favor of the Representation of the People Act. This law made it possible for women in England to vote for the first time, although it contained stipulations concerning those who were able to maintain social standing. In response to the changing spheres, Loy wrote Feminist Manifesto.

The manifesto begins with a direct call on women:

The feminist movement as at present instituted is Inadequate. Women if you want to realize yourselves—you are on the eve of a devastating psychological upheaval—all your pet illusions must be unmasked—the lies of centuries have got to go—are you prepared for the Wrench—? There is no half-measure—NO scratching on the surface of the rubbish heap of tradition, will bring about Reform, the only method is Absolute Demolition. Cease to place your confidence in economic legislation, vice-crusades & uniform education—you are glossing over Reality. Professional & commercial careers are opening up for you—Is that all you want?

== Impact on feminism and manifestos ==
=== Legacy in feminist theory ===
Feminist manifestos like Valerie Solanas' SCUM Manifesto have borrowed some of the ideas employed in Feminist Manifesto, such as the critique of men's historical influence on societal structures and the call for significant change..

=== Manifesto theory ===
The Modernist Manifesto is considered to be a public declaration of artistic convictions. This particular manifesto employs this characteristic by utilizing a more expressive form concerning word choice and sentence placement. Its form and language reflect a stance of autonomy and individuality using intense language for the purpose of getting readers invested. The manifesto originated from the idea to make works public. This same idea was practical in conveying a particular medium in which the audience was not specified, but intrigued by the intense tone and information presented through text. In the Modernist manifesto, hostile rhetoric became an essential tool to the material previously written.

== Reception and criticism ==
Feminist Manifesto has been one of the many templates used concerning women's issues since its unpublished release. Scholars such as Susan Gilmore and Cristanne Miller argue that the text itself is a reflection of Loy's personal experience.

"Susan Gilmore, for instance, defines impersonality as a masculinist striving for “invisibility” through the “transcendence” of the “emotion[al]” and the “personal,” and uses “Feminist Manifesto” to categorize Loy’s project as a contrary aesthetic that “foregrounds the female poet’s visibility” and an “authority borne not of cultural transcendence but of cultural disenfranchisement.”'

"'Similarly, Cristanne Miller, also citing the manifesto and aligning impersonality with the negation of the personal, contends that Loy “eschew[s] even apparent lyric impersonality” by “maintain[ing] strong illocutionary and suggestively autobiographical elements” in her poetry.'"
