= Henri Serre =

French actor (1931–2023)

- Born: 26 February 1931; Sète, France
- Died: 9 October 2023 (aged 92); Saint-Jean-du-Bruel, France
- Occupation: Actor
- Years active: 1953–1990

Henri Serre (26 February 1931 – 9 October 2023) was a French actor who was best known for his role as Jim, a "vivid, melancholy, and finally tragic figure" in François Truffaut's Jules and Jim. Other appearances include The Fire Within, Section spéciale and Mister Frost. Serre died on 9 October 2023, at the age of 92.

== Partial filmography ==
- Women of Paris (1953)
- Le combat dans l'ile (1961)
- La Meule (short film) - René Allio, 1962)
- Jules et Jim (Jules and Jim, 1962)
- Il Processo di Veronal (1963)
- Le Feu follet (The Fire Within, Louis Malle, 1963)
- Atout cœur à Tokyo pour O.S.S. 117 (1966)
- Fantômas contre Scotland Yard (Fantomas Against Scotland Yard, 1967)
- Romance of a Horsethief (1971)
- Le Sourire vertical (1973)
- Section spéciale (Costa-Gavras, 1974)
- Club privé pour couples avertis (1974)
- Le Soulier de satin (1985)
- Je t'ai dans la peau (1990)
