= Les jeux sont faits (film) =

1947 film

- Directed by: Jean Delannoy
- Written by: Jacques-Laurent Bost; Jean Delannoy; Jean-Paul Sartre
- Produced by: Louis Wipf
- Starring: Micheline Presle
- Cinematography: Christian Matras
- Edited by: Henri Taverna
- Release date: 2 July 1947
- Running time: 105 minutes
- Country: France
- Language: French

Les jeux sont faits, known in English as The Chips are Down, is a 1947 French fantasy film directed by Jean Delannoy, based on the screenplay of the same name by French philosopher Jean-Paul Sartre. It was entered into the 1947 Cannes Film Festival.

== Plot ==
In a country very similar to France under German military occupation, two people are murdered at the same moment. Ève, a young woman married to an influential man, is unknowingly poisoned by him so that he can get her money and seduce her naîve younger sister, Lucette. Pierre, a worker and a leader of the resistance, is shot by an informer. The two wake up as though they are still alive, yet are unable to communicate or interact with the living. They find out that they are soulmates, yet were unable to meet during their lives, and are thus sent back to the living world so that they can fall in love. The only condition is that they must show their love for each other within 24 hours - if they fail to do so, they must leave the world of the living. Their first mission is to do a favour to a dead man who was worried about his young daughter. Then, after brief sex, they address unfinished business. Ève confronts her scheming husband and attempts to convince her sister of his treachery. Pierre goes to a meeting of his fellow resistors and tries to convince them that their organisation is compromised by traitors. They find themselves unable to pursue their love for each other, instead focused on their individual lives and the people they left behind. Sent back to the afterlife, they agree to part.

== Cast ==
- Micheline Presle as Eve Charlier
- Marcello Pagliero as Pierre Dumaine
- Marguerite Moreno as La dame de l'au-delà
- Charles Dullin as Le marquis
- Fernand Fabre as André Charlier
- Jacques Erwin as Jean Aguerra
- Colette Ripert as Lucette
- Marcel Mouloudji as Lucien Derjeu
- Guy Decomble as Poulain
- Howard Vernon as Le chef milicien
- Jim Gérald as Renaudel
- Renaud Mary as Un milicien
- André Carnège as Le ministre de la justice
- Andrée Ducret as Madame Astin
- Robert Dalban as Georges
