= Clara Tice =

American avant-garde illustrator and artist

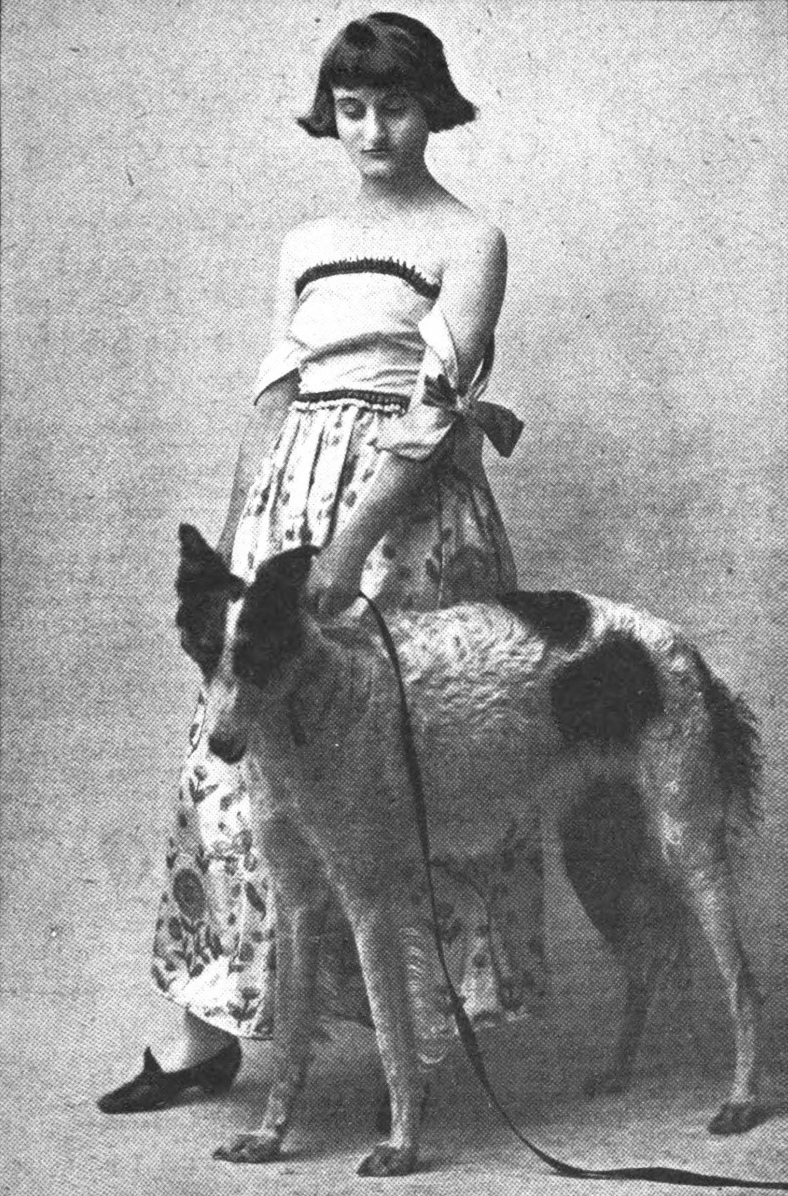
- Tice in 1916
- Born: May 22, 1888
- Died: February 2, 1973 (aged 84)
- Known for: Representative of bohemian Greenwich Village, known as "The Queen of Greenwich Village"
- Notable work: ABC Dogs
- Movement: Avant-garde
- Patrons: Robert Henri

Clara Tice (22 May 1888 – 2 February 1973) was an American avant-garde illustrator and artist, who spent most of her life in New York City, United States. Because of her provocative art and public appearances, she was seen as representative of bohemian Greenwich Village and thus known as "The Queen of Greenwich Village."

== Early life ==
According to herself and The New York Times, in 1908 Tice was the first woman in Greenwich Village to bob her hair. Around the same time, Tice was able to study under the famous artist and teacher Robert Henri. In 1910, Henri and some of his artist friends, organized the first exhibition of Independent Artists. This art show, which was with its jury-free and no-awards concept quite a revolution at that time and thus received enormous attention, was financially backed by Tice and featured her works.

== Immersion in the arts ==
A few years later, namely in 1915, Tice's fame skyrocketed when Anthony Comstock, main founder of the Society for the Suppression of Vice, tried to confiscate Tice's art at the well-known bohemian restaurant Polly's. Thereafter images of Tice's artworks and photos of the artist were featured in magazines such as Vanity Fair, Rogue, The Blind Man, and Cartoons magazine. During that time she had several one-person exhibitions and also worked on numerous other projects, for example, she created posters for bohemian costume balls and played herself in the 1922 version of the Greenwich Village Follies.

During those years, Tice not only played an important part in Greenwich Village's colorful art scene, but also joined the Arensberg Circle in their uptown location. It was probably Marcel Duchamp who introduced Tice to Walter and Louise Arensberg and their salon. There she met Henri-Pierre Roché, with whom she spent several evenings. Tice also participated in two projects by the Arensberg Circle: first, two of her works were shown in the first exhibition of the Society of Independent Artists and second, one of her works was featured in The Blind Man.

During the 1920s, she illustrated about a dozen books with her erotic images, these are nowadays expensive collector's items. In 1940, her own book called ABC Dogs was published. It is a children's book in which each letter of the alphabet is represented by a dog breed whose name starts with the same letter. This publication sparked renewed interest in Tice and her art. She also worked on her memoirs, which she never completed.
