= Louise Varèse =

American translator

Edgard and Louise Varèse in the 1960s

Louise Varèse (French pronunciation: [lwiz vaʁɛz]; née McCutcheon; 20 November 1890 – 1 July 1989), also credited as Louise Norton or Louise Norton-Varèse, was an American writer, editor, and translator of French literature who was involved with New York Dadaism.

== Early life and education ==
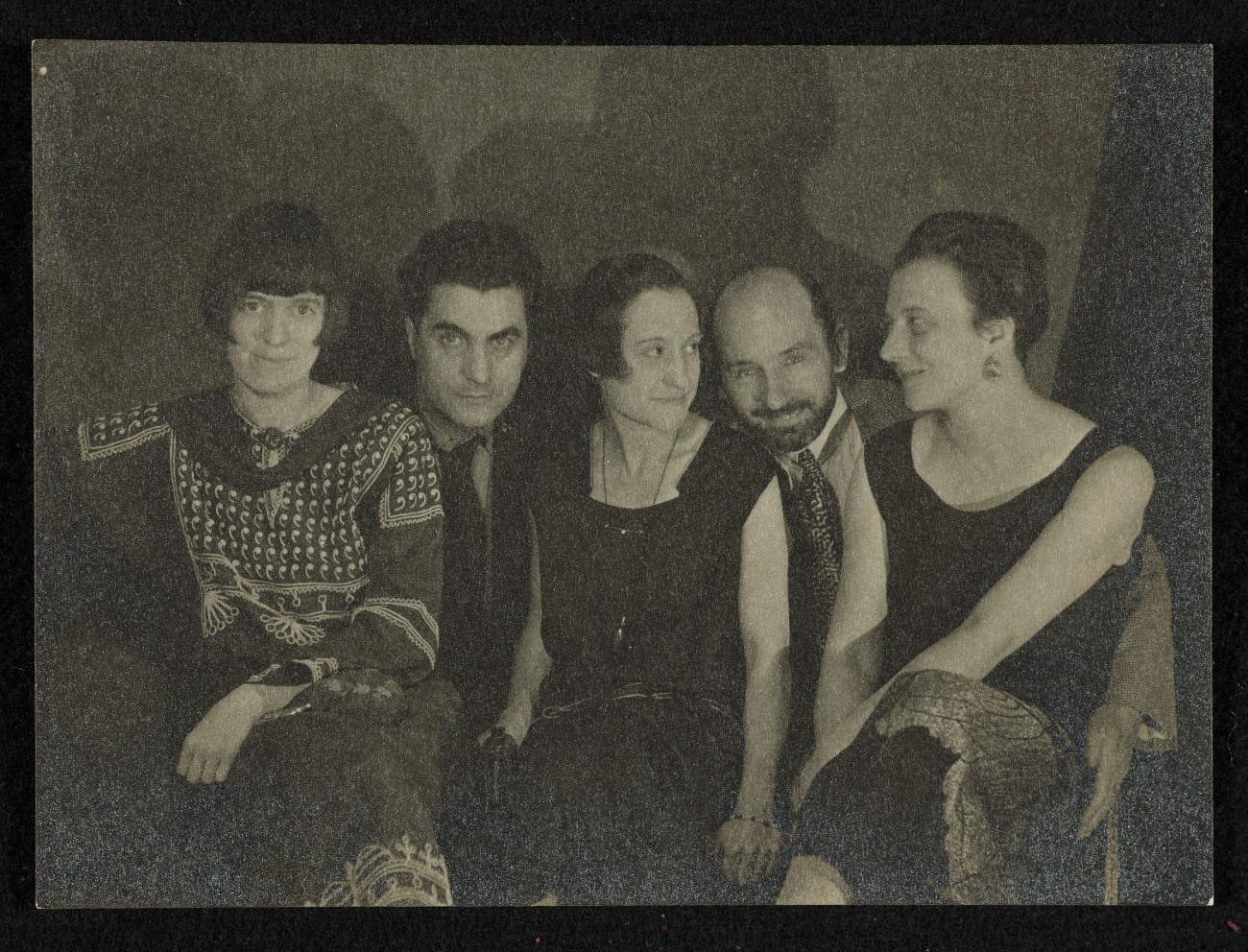
1924 group photo of Louise Varèse, Edgard Varèse, Suzanne Duchamp, Jean Crotti, and Mary Reynolds

Varèse was born Louise McCutcheon in Pittsburgh, Pennsylvania, to John Lindsay McCutcheon and Mary Louise Taylor. She attended Smith College (class of 1912), but left in the fall of 1911 to marry Allen Norton.

== Career ==
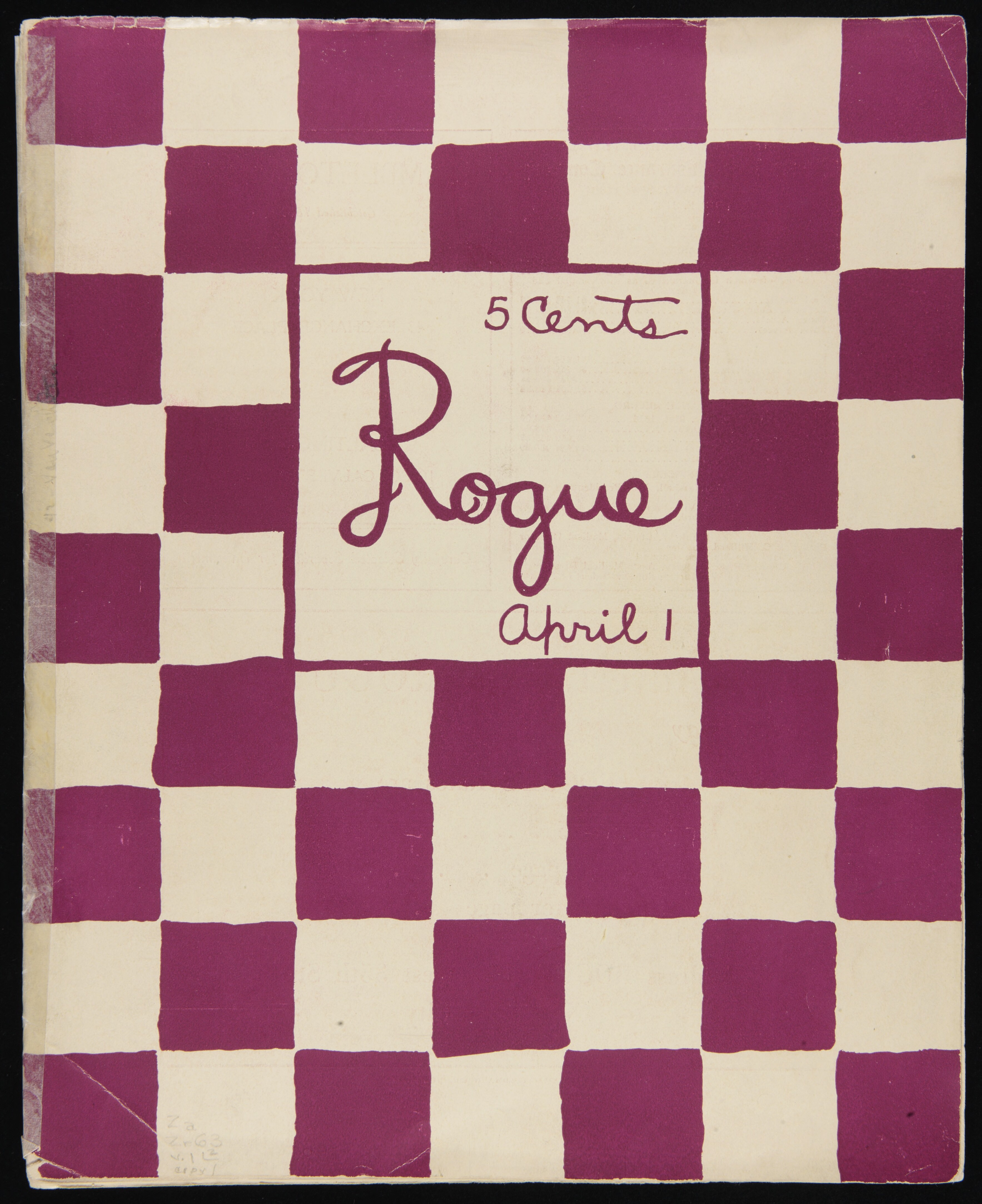
Cover of Rogue, April 1, 1915

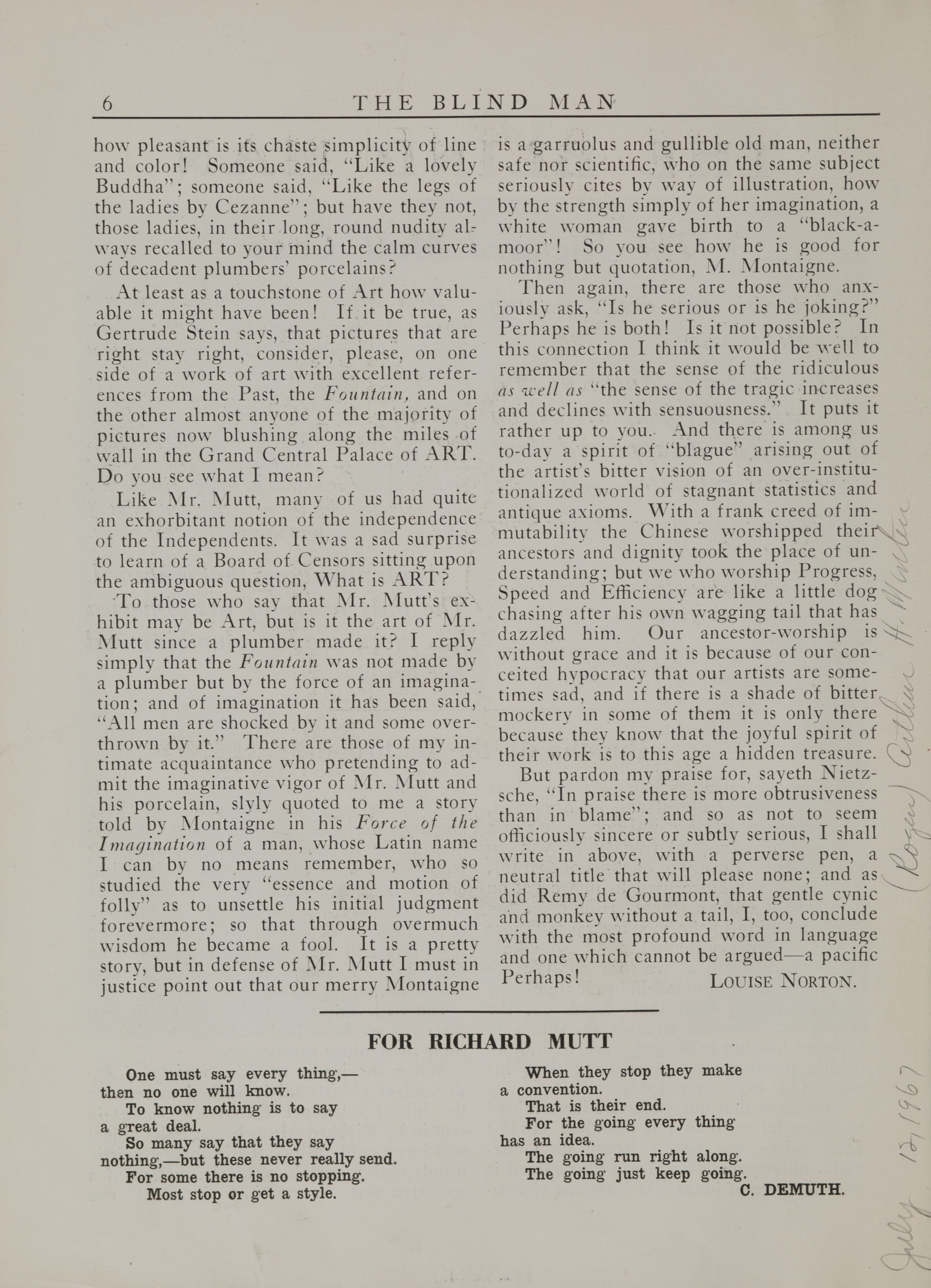
Louise Norton's article on Fountain, part 2

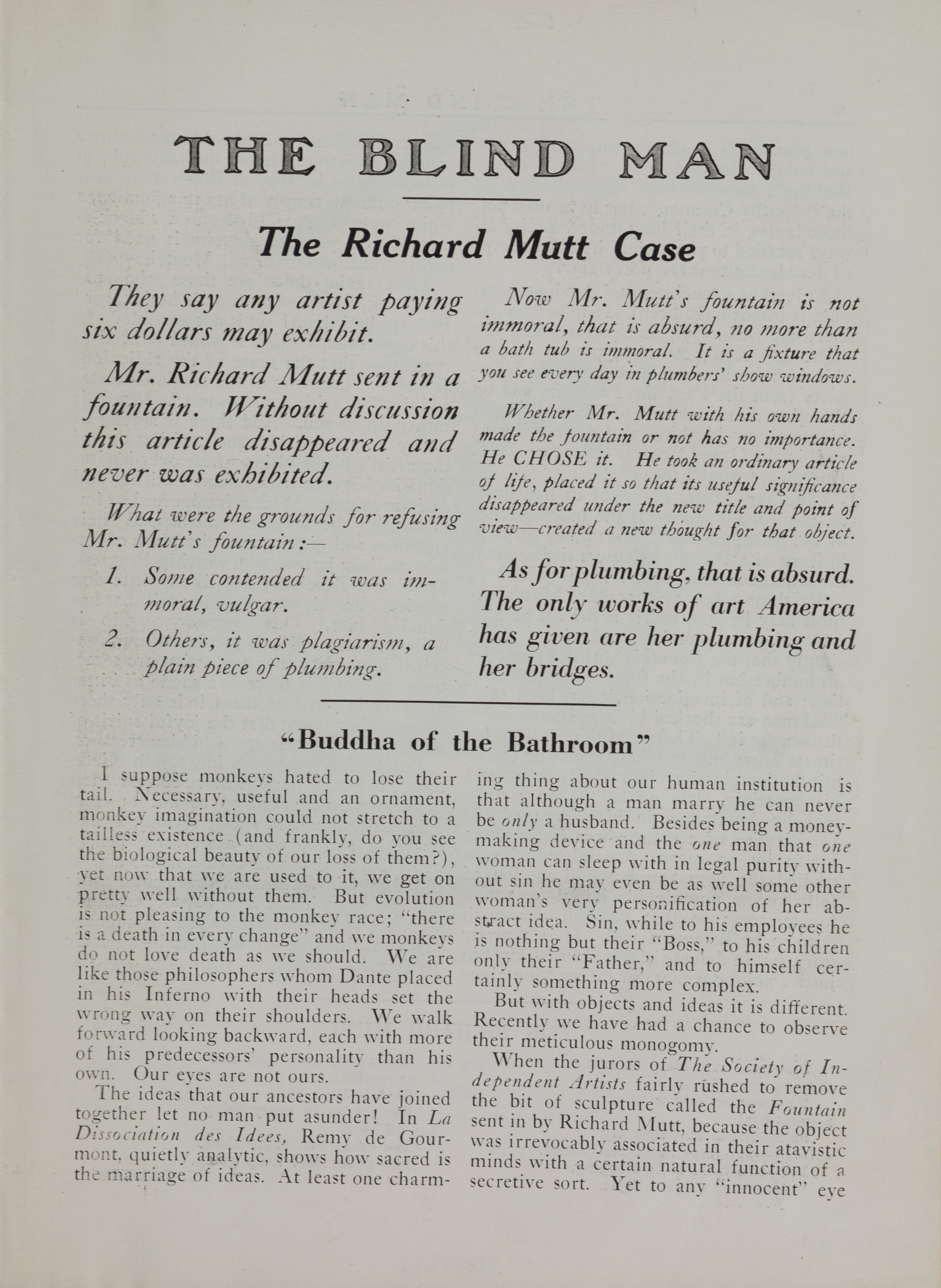
Louise Norton's article on Fountain, part 1

Varèse founded and edited the modernist magazine Rogue (a play off of Vogue) with her then-husband, Allen Norton, from 1915 to 1916. She sometimes wrote under the pseudonym "Dame Rogue". Under this pseudonym, Varèse wrote a fashion column called "Philosophic Fashions". She was also a contributor to the New York Dada magazine The Blind Man.

Varèse (then Norton) met Marcel Duchamp in 1915 and became close friends. She was involved in the 1917 Society of Independent Artists submission of a urinal under the name R.Mutt known as Fountain. She wrote a defense of the work titled "Buddha of the Bathroom" in issue 2 of The Blind Man.

Her address also appears on the label of Fountain as seen in the Alfred Stieglitz photograph of the work and her phone number was given as an alternative to Duchamp's as press contact. As such, she is a likely candidate for the "female friend" Duchamp mentions in a letter dated 11 April 1917 to his sister Suzanne: "Une de mes amies sous un pseudonyme masculin, Richard Mutt, avait envoyé une pissotière en porcelaine comme sculpture" ("One of my female friends under a masculine pseudonym, Richard Mutt, sent in a porcelain urinal as a sculpture.").

Varèse translated poetry and other works by Charles Baudelaire, Julien Gracq, Saint-John Perse, Marcel Proust, Arthur Rimbaud, Georges Simenon, and Stendhal. Her translations of the work of Arthur Rimbaud for James Laughlin's New Directions imprint were particularly influential. In 1956, she translated the section "The Great Improvisation" from Adam Mickiewicz's poetic drama Dziady.

She played an important role in the International Composers' Guild, and included material about this organisation in her book Varèse; a looking-glass diary (1972).

In 1972, she wrote a biography of her late second husband, Edgard Varèse, titled: Varèse: A Looking-Glass Diary. For the exhibition Marcel Duchamp at the Philadelphia Museum of Art in 1973, Varèse wrote an essay titled "Marcel Duchamp at Play".

== Personal life ==
Her first husband was poet and literary editor Allen Norton, the couple had a son, Michael in 1912, separated in 1916, and divorced in 1920. Louise also had a granddaughter, Sylvia Calderwood.

In 1922 she married composer Edgard Varèse; they remained together until his death in 1965.

== Death ==
Varèse died on July 1, 1989, at the age of 98 in Eugene, Oregon.

== Awards ==
- In 1948, Varèse was awarded the Denyse Clairouin Award for her translation of Paris Spleen by Baudelaire.
- She was awarded the Chevalier de l'Ordre des Arts et des Lettres in 1969.
- Varèse was awarded MacDowell fellowships from 1967 through 1975.

== Bibliography ==
=== Fiction ===
- Norton, Louise (1914). Little Wax Candle: A Farce in One Act. New York: Claire Marie. OCLC 776860.

=== Nonfiction ===
- Norton [Varèse], Louise. "Buddha of the Bathroom", The Blind Man 2. May 1917: 5–6.
- Varèse, Louise. Varèse; a looking-glass diary. New York: W. W. Norton & Company, 1972. ISBN 9780393074611
- [Norton] Varèse. Louise. "Marcel Duchamp at Play", in Marcel Duchamp, ed. Anne d'Harnoncourt and Kynaston McShine. New York: Museum of Modern Art; Philadelphia: Philadelphia Museum of Art. 1973; rpt. 1989. 224–225. ISBN 9780876330432

=== Translations ===
- Saint-John Perse, Éloges and Other Poems, W. W. Norton & Company, 1944
- Arthur Rimbaud, A Season in Hell, New Directions Publishing, 1945
- Arthur Rimbaud, Illuminations, New Directions Publishing, 1946
- Georges Bernanos, Joy, Pantheon Books, 1946
- Jacques Lemarchand, Parenthesis, Alfred A. Knopf, 1947
- Charles Baudelaire, Paris Spleen, New Directions Publishing, 1947
- Marcel Proust, Pleasures and Regrets, Crown Publishers, 1946
- Jean-Paul Sartre, The Chips are Down, Lear Publishers, 1948
- Georges Simenon, The Snow Was Black, Prentice-Hall, 1950
- Stendhal, Lucien Leuwen Book I: The Green Huntsman, New Directions Publishing, 1950
- Stendhal, Lucien Leuwen Book II: The Telegraph, New Directions Publishing, 1950
- Georges Bernanos, Joy, Pantheon, 1951
- Georges Simenon, The Heart of a Man, New American Library, 1951
- Julien Gracq, The Castle of Argol, New Directions, 1951
- Georges Simenon, The Girl in His Past, Prentice-Hall, 1952
- Georges Simenon, I Take This Woman, Signet, 1953
- Henri Michaux, Miserable Miracle (Mescaline), City Lights Books, 1956
