= Denyse Clairouin =

French translator

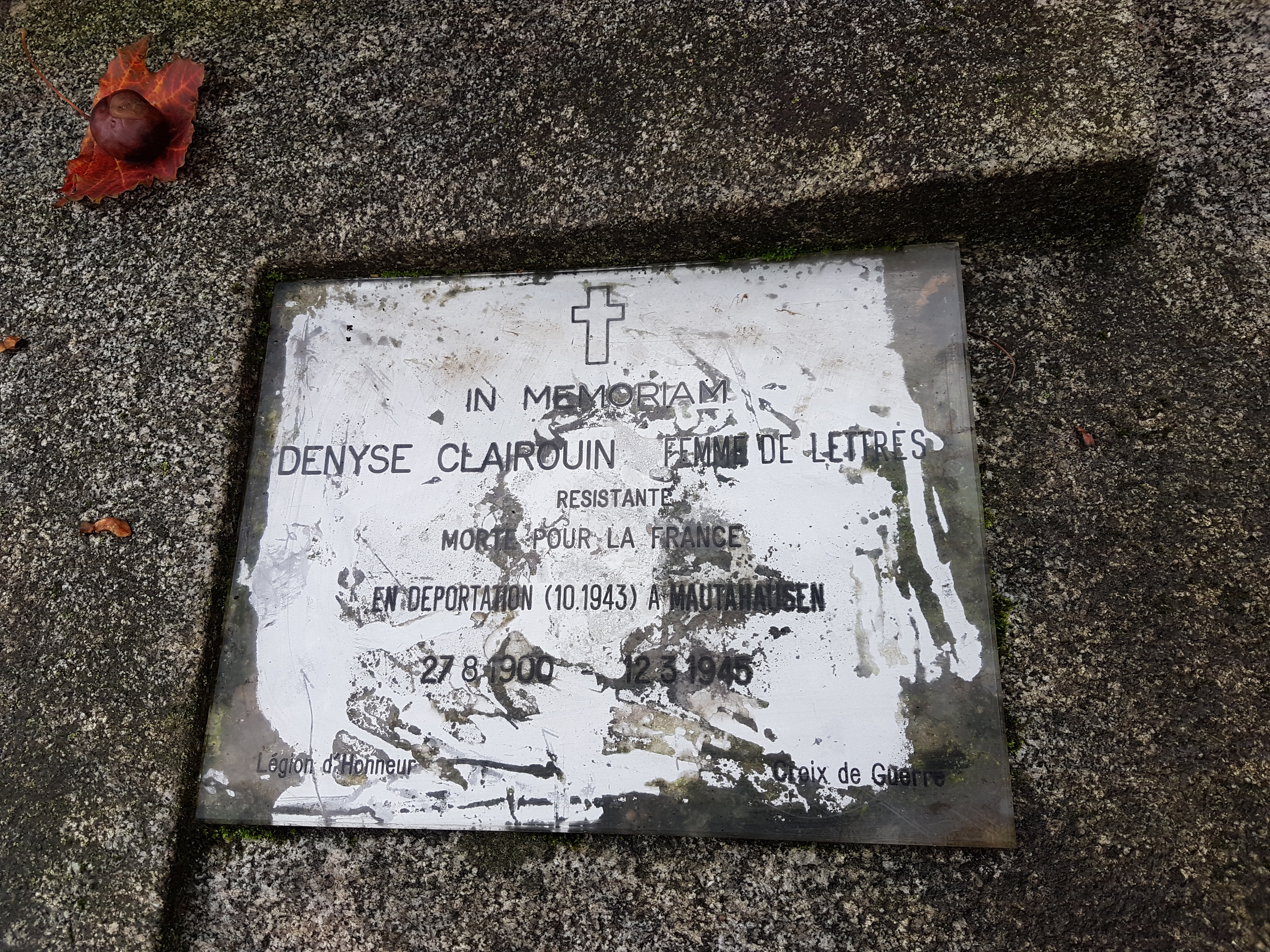
- Plaque in memory of Denyse Clairouin at the Père Lachaise Cemetery (division 24), Paris
- Born: August 27, 1900; Paris, France
- Died: March 12, 1945 (aged 44); Mauthausen concentration camp, occupied Austria
- Awards: Legion of Honour; Croix de Guerre

Denyse Henriette Léonie Clairouin (27 August 1900 in Paris – 12 March 1945 in Mauthausen) was a French translator and Resistance fighter.

During the Second World War, she was part of the Resistance (group Secret Army). She was arrested in 1943 and deported to Ravensbrück and then Mauthausen. She died in deportation in March 1945. She was awarded the Legion of Honour and the Croix de Guerre.

In 1945, the Denyse Clairouin literary prize was created to celebrate her memory. In 1948, Louise Varèse was awarded the prize for her translation of Paris Spleen by Charles Baudelaire.
