= Jules and Jim =

1962 film by François Truffaut

- Theatrical release poster by Christian Broutin
- French: Jules et Jim
- Directed by: François Truffaut
- Screenplay by: François Truffaut; Jean Gruault
- Based on: Jules et Jim; 1953 novel by Henri-Pierre Roché
- Produced by: Marcel Berbert; François Truffaut
- Starring: Jeanne Moreau; Oskar Werner; Henri Serre; Marie Dubois
- Cinematography: Raoul Coutard
- Edited by: Claudine Bouché
- Music by: Georges Delerue
- Production companies: Les Films du Carrosse; SEDIF
- Distributed by: Cinédis
- Release date: 23 January 1962 (France)
- Running time: 105 minutes
- Country: France
- Languages: French; German
- Box office: 1,595,379 admissions (France)

Jules and Jim (French: Jules et Jim [ʒyl e dʒim]) is a 1962 French New Wave romantic drama film directed, produced and co-written by François Truffaut. Set before, during, and after World War I, it follows a love triangle involving French bohemian Jim (Henri Serre), his shy Austrian friend Jules (Oskar Werner), and Jules' girlfriend and later wife Catherine (Jeanne Moreau). Hailed as a definitive example of French New Wave (Nouvelle Vague) cinema, the film is still regarded as a classic. It won the 1962 Étoile de Cristal, with Moreau winning that year's prize for best actress.

== Plot ==
In 1912, Jules, a shy Austrian writer living in Paris, forges a friendship with the more extroverted Frenchman Jim. They share an interest in the world of the arts and the bohemian lifestyle. At a slide show, they become entranced with a bust of a goddess with a serene smile and travel to an island in the Adriatic Sea to see it.

After encounters with several women, they meet the free-spirited, capricious Catherine, who reminds them of the statue, and the three become inseparable. Although she begins a relationship with Jules, both men are affected by her presence and her attitude toward life, and the three take a seaside holiday together. Jim continues to be involved with his girlfriend Gilberte, usually seeing her apart from Jules and Catherine. Catherine asks to speak with Jim at a cafe, but she does not show up on time and he leaves. A few days before the beginning of World War I, Jules and Catherine move to Austria to get married. Both he and Jim serve during the war, on opposing sides; each fears throughout the conflict the potential for facing the other or learning that he might have killed his friend.

After the war, Jim visits, and later stays with, Jules, Catherine, and their young daughter Sabine at their chalet in the Black Forest. Jules confides to Jim about the tensions in their marriage; Catherine torments and punishes him at times with numerous affairs, and she once left him and Sabine for six months. Catherine flirts with and attempts to seduce Jim, who has never forgotten her. Jules, fearful that Catherine might leave him forever, gives his blessing for Jim to marry Catherine so that he may continue to visit them and see her. The three live happily with Sabine in the chalet until tensions between Jim and Catherine arise over their inability to conceive a child.

Jim leaves Catherine and returns to Paris. After several exchanges of letters between Catherine and Jim, they resolve to reunite when she learns that she is pregnant. The reunion does not occur after Jules writes to tell Jim that Catherine has suffered a miscarriage.

After a time, Jim runs into Jules in Paris. He learns that Jules and Catherine have returned to France. Catherine tries to win Jim back, but he rebuffs her, saying that he is going to marry Gilberte. She pulls a gun on him, but he wrestles it away and flees.

Jim encounters Jules and Catherine in the Studio des Ursulines cinema during a screening of a newsreel depicting Nazi book burnings. The three of them meet at an outdoor cafe. Catherine asks Jim to get into her car, saying that she has something to tell him. She asks Jules to watch them and then drives the car off a ruined bridge into the nearby river, killing both herself and Jim. Jules attends the burial of their ashes in the columbarium at the Père Lachaise Cemetery; Catherine had wanted her ashes to be scattered in the wind from a hilltop, but at the time this was not legal.

== Cast ==
- Jeanne Moreau as Catherine
- Oskar Werner as Jules
- Henri Serre as Jim
- Vanna Urbino as Gilberte, Jim's fiancée
- Serge Rezvani (credited under the name "Boris Bassiak") as Albert, Catherine's sometime lover
- Marie Dubois as Thérèse, Jules' ex-girlfriend
- Sabine Haudepin as Sabine, Jules and Catherine's daughter
- Kate Noëlle as Birgitta
- Anny Nelsen as Lucy
- Christiane Wagner as Helga
- Jean-Louis Richard as a customer in cafe
- Michel Varesano as a customer in cafe
- Pierre Fabre as a drunk in the cafe
- Danielle Bassiak as Albert's companion
- Bernard Largemains as Merlin
- Elen Bober as Mathilde
- Dominique Lacarrière as a woman
- Michel Subor as the Narrator (voice)

== Production ==
The film is based on a 1953 semi-autobiographical novel by Henri-Pierre Roché describing his relationship with young writer Franz Hessel and Hessel's wife Helen Grund. Truffaut came across the book in the mid-1950s at a shop in Paris, and later befriended Roché. The author approved of Truffaut's interest in adapting the work.

The score was composed by Georges Delerue.

== Reception and accolades ==
The film was hailed as a fine example of French New Wave cinema. Encyclopaedia Britannica says it "epitomizes the type of groundbreaking cinema that originated in Europe during the postwar years through the 1960s". The critic Ginette Vincendeau defined Jeanne Moreau's style as the incarnation of the French New Wave actress: "beautiful, but in a kind of natural way; sexy, but intellectual at the same time, a kind of cerebral sexuality—this was the hallmark of the nouvelle vague woman."

According to The New York Times film critic Bosley Crowther in 1962, "the emotional content [of the film] is largely carried in the musical score" by Georges Delerue, which he lauded. The soundtrack was named as one of the "10 best soundtracks" by Time magazine in its "All Time 100 Movies" list.

The film remains a "cult classic". English critic Peter Bradshaw, re-evaluating the film upon its re-release in cinemas in February 2022, gives Jules and Jim 5 out of 5 stars.

== Accolades ==
The film won the 1962 Étoile de Cristal, with Moreau winning that year's prize for best actress. The film was ranked #46 in Empire magazine's 2010 list of "The 100 Best Films Of World Cinema" in 2010.

=== Awards and nominations ===
Year	Award ceremony	Category	Nominee	Result
1963	BAFTA	Best Film from Any Source	Jules and Jim	Nominated
1963	BAFTA	Best Foreign Actress	Jeanne Moreau	Nominated
1963	Bodil Awards	Best European Film	Jules and Jim	Won
1963	Italian National Syndicate of Film Journalists	Best Foreign Director	François Truffaut	Won
1962	Cahiers du cinéma	Annual Top 10 List	François Truffaut	2nd
1962	Mar del Plata Film Festival	Best Film	François Truffaut	Nominated
1962	Mar del Plata Film Festival	Best Director	François Truffaut	Won

== Influence ==
According to ShortList, "The pacy energy of GoodFellas (1990) was influenced by [Martin] Scorsese’s love of French New Wave cinema, especially François Truffaut’s doomed love triangle classic Jules et Jim. He wanted a similar voiceover to open, along with extensive narration, quick cuts and freeze frame shots."

The film has been cited as an influence on George Lucas.

The production of Jules et Jim was the subject of a documentary directed in 2009 by Thierry Tripod.
