= Franz Hessel =

German writer and translator (1880–1941)

Franz Hessel (November 21, 1880 – January 6, 1941) was a German writer and translator. With Walter Benjamin, he produced a German translation of three volumes of Marcel Proust's 1913-1927 work À la recherche du temps perdu in the late 1920s.

Hessel's parents, Fanny and Heinrich Hessel, came to Berlin in 1880, and joined the Lutheran church (having been born Jewish). In 1900, when Franz Hessel's father died, he left a large fortune, enabling Franz Hessel to live a carefree life in Munich and Paris. In 1901, he attended Ludwig-Maximilians-Universität München, where he published twelve poems in Avalun. Ein Jahrbuch neuer deutscher lyrischer Wortkunst. In 1908, he published his first prose collection, Laura Wunderl. Müncher Novellen. In 1913, he married Helen Grund, and published Der Kramladen des Glücks. On 27 July 1914, their first son Ulrich was born, and in 1917, their second son Stefan was born. In 1920, he published Pariser Romanze. In 1922, he published Von den Irrtümern der Liebenden. Eine Nachtwache.

Hessel became one of the first German exponents of the French idea of flânerie, and in 1929 published a collection of essays on the subject related to his native Berlin, Walking in Berlin (German: Spazieren in Berlin). Reviewing the book in 1929, Benjamin described it as "an echo of the stories the city has told [Hessel] ever since he was a child—an epic book through and through, a process of memorizing while strolling around, a book for which memory has acted not as the source but as the Muse." Concluding, Benjamin wrote: "if a Berliner is willing to explore his city for any treasures other than neon advertisements, he will grow to love this book."

In October 1938, the Hessels fled Germany for exile in Paris. In April 1940, the family fled Paris for Sanary-sur-Mer. In May, Franz and Ulrich were interned in Camp des Milles. On 27 July 1940, both were released and were able to return to Helen in Sanary-sur-Mer. However, Franz had dysentery, and had suffered a stroke, from which he did not recover.

Hessel inspired the character of Jules in Henri-Pierre Roche's novel Jules et Jim.

== English translations ==
- Walking in Berlin. Translated by Amanda DeMarco. Scribe Publications, 2017.
