= The Blind Man =

New York Dada magazine

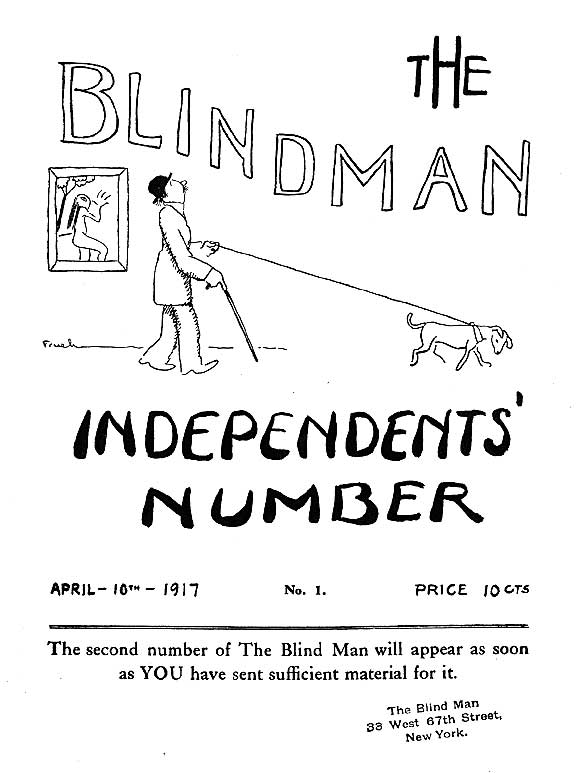
Issue 1, April 1917

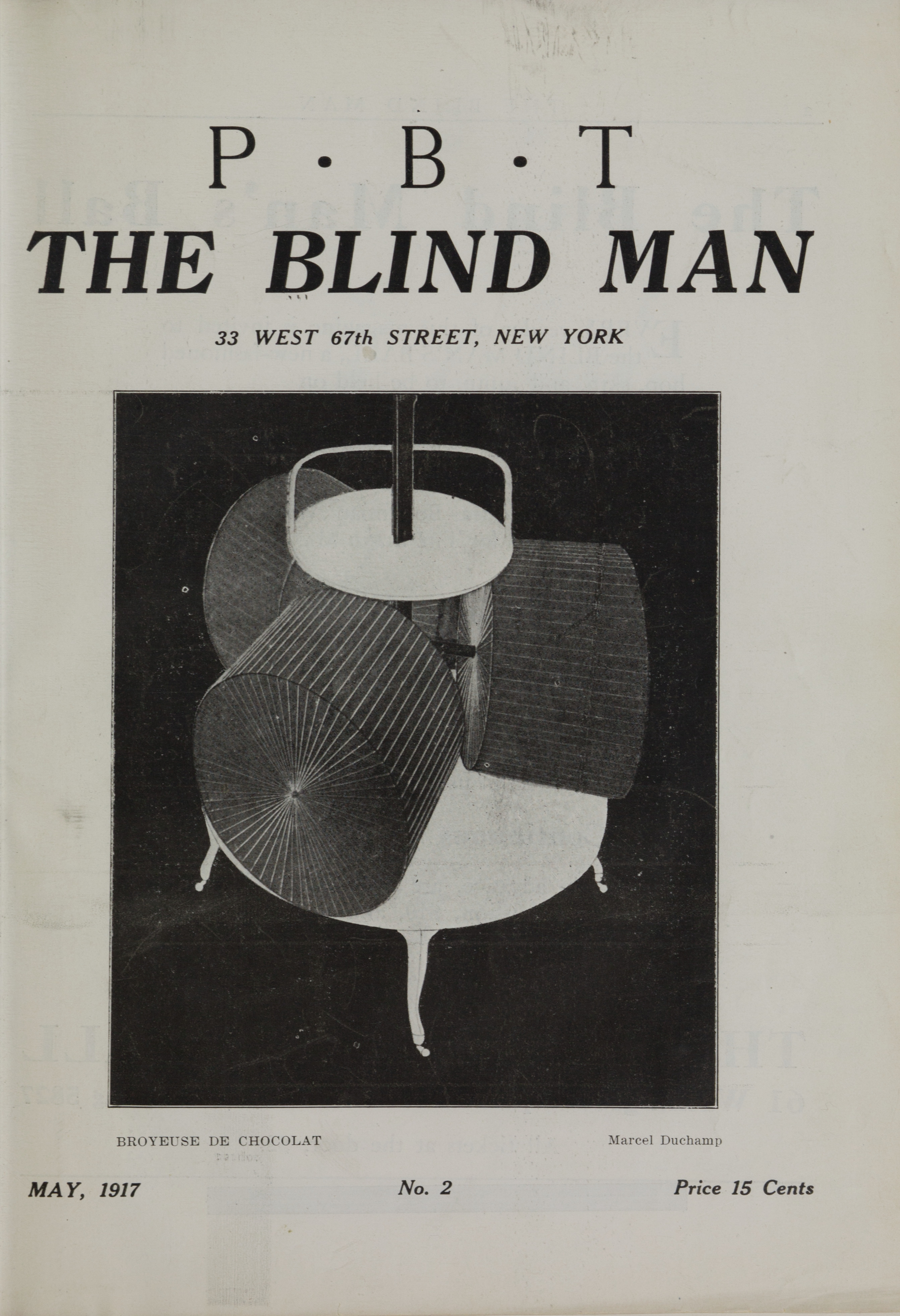
Issue 2, May 1917

The Blind Man was an art and Dada journal published briefly by the New York Dadaists in 1917.

== History ==
Henri-Pierre Roché and Marcel Duchamp, visiting from France, organized the magazine with Beatrice Wood in New York City. Mina Loy also contributed to the first, Independents' Number issue.

They published only one more issue, with the following contributors:

- Walter Arensberg (Axiom, Theorem, poems),
- Gabrièle Buffet-Picabia (Marie Laurencin, essay),
- Robert Carlton (Bob) Brown (poems),
- Frank Crowninshield (letter),
- Charles Demuth (For Richard Mutt, poem),
- Marcel Duchamp, "Charles Duncan" (poem), an essay about Louis Michael Eilshemius,
- Mina Loy (prose),
- Louise Norton (essay),
- Francis Picabia (Medusa, poem),
- Joseph Stella (Coney Island, picture),
- Erik Satie (A Tale, poem),
- Frances Simpson Stevens (poem),
- Alfred Stieglitz (Fountain by R. Mutt, photography; letter) and
- Clara Tice (drawing).

Volume 2 is best known for the group's reaction to the rejection of Duchamp's Fountain by an unjuried art show in 1917. Although the magazine had a brief life, it was influential as the first publication by Dadaists in the United States.

After The Blind Man, Duchamp also launched another short-lived magazine, of which only a single issue was made, Rongwrong.

== Facsimile ==
As part of the Dada centennial celebrations, Ugly Duckling Presse published a 1000-copy, boxed-set, limited-edition facsimile of the two editions of The Blind Man, called The Blind Man: New York Dada, 1917.
