= Edith Clifford Williams =

Edith Clifford Williams (1885–1971) was an early pioneer in the American abstract art movement. She was part of the circle that gathered around the photographer and modern art promoter Alfred Stieglitz. She was also a long-time confidante of Hu Shih (1891–1962), who was arguably the most prominent Chinese intellectual in the first half of the 20th century.

Born in Ithaca, New York, Williams—who preferred to be known as Clifford—spent most of her girlhood in New Haven, Connecticut, where her father, Henry Shaler Williams, taught geology and paleontology at Yale University. After studying with the painter John Henry Twachtman and at Yale’s School of the Fine Arts, she traveled to Europe, and was enrolled briefly at the Académie Julian in Paris.

Williams’s earliest known abstract painting was entitled 1914. In 1916, she created a piece of sculpture meant for touching, not just viewing, at the studio of Mexican artist Marius De Zayas, titled Plâtre à toucher chez de Zayas. The Spanish artist and critic Francis Picabia brought a photograph of the sculpture to Paris, where it became the subject of a lecture given by French critic and poet Guillaume Apollinaire. The photograph resurfaced four years later in the French newspaper Comoedia, when Picabia cited it to refute the idea that “tactile art” had been invented by Italian Futurist Filippo Tommaso Marinetti.

In 1917, Williams showed two works, 1915 and Two Rhythms, at the inaugural exhibition of the Society of Independent Artists. The latter is now on permanent exhibit at the Philadelphia Museum of Art, as part of the Louise and Walter Arensberg Collection.

Williams’s father was the only member of her family to have taken her art seriously; she gave up art after his death in 1918. She fell back on her scientific training and served, with distinction, as the first full-time librarian of the Flower Veterinary Library at Cornell University from 1923 to 1946.

Williams and Hu Shih exchanged more than 300 letters over the space of nearly half a century. The correspondence—uncovered in 1998 in Beijing and Taipei archives by Professor Chou Chih-p’ing of Princeton University in 1998reveals that Hu’s early social and political views were heavily influenced by Williams. Hu’s campaign for the adoption of the vernacular as the language for literary expression in China might well have been inspired by his exposure, through Williams, to the American avant-garde art movement. The correspondence also shows that the two were, for a short time, lovers; in addition to Hu, Williams had an intimate relationship with Charles Duncan, an artist who was the subject of one of Charles Demuth’s famous portrait posters.
