= Henri-Pierre Roché =

French writer

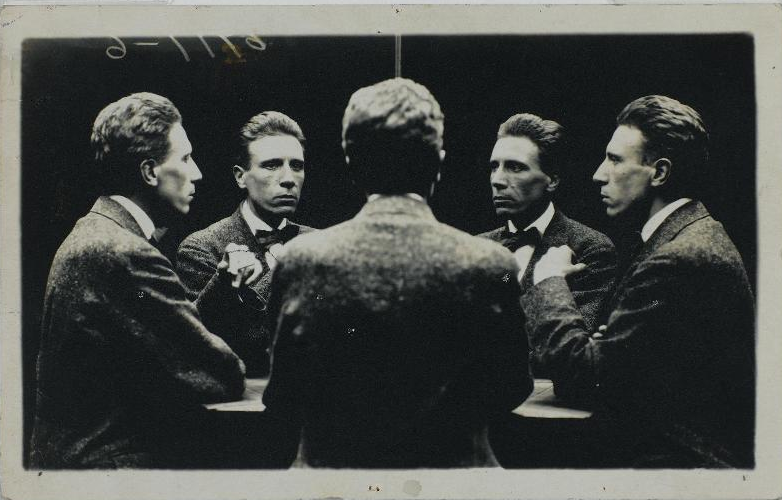
Henri-Pierre Roché (multiple portrait), 1917

Henri-Pierre Roché (28 May 1879 – 9 April 1959) was a French author who was involved with the artistic avant-garde in Paris and the Dada movement. Late in life, Roché published two novels. The first was Jules et Jim (1953), a semi-autobiographical work published when he was 74. His second novel, Deux Anglaises et le continent (Two English Girls, 1956), also was inspired by his life. Both were adapted as films by the director François Truffaut, in 1962 and 1971 respectively. The popularity of the film Jules and Jim brought renewed attention to Roché's novels and life.

== Early life ==
Roché was born in Paris, France. In 1879, he was an art student at the Académie Julian.

== Career ==
Roché became a journalist as well as an art collector and dealer. At the turn of the 20th century, he became close friends with young European artists in the Montparnasse Quarter of Paris, including Manuel Ortíz de Zárate and Marie Vassilieff; and from Montmartre, Max Jacob and Pablo Picasso. He was at home in the world of artists, collectors and gallerists. In November 1905, he introduced the Americans Gertrude Stein and her brother Leo to Picasso.

Leo Stein described Roché as "a tall man with an inquiring eye under an inquisitive forehead, wanted to know something more about everything. He was a born liaison officer, who knew everybody and wanted everybody to know everybody else." Gertrude, in chapter 3 of her The Autobiography of Alice B. Toklas, described Roché in much the same terms. She particularly appreciated his having read her Three Lives and early recognition of her value as a writer.

Roché was also a friend of Francis Picabia, Constantin Brâncuși and Marcel Duchamp. Following his discharge from the French army, Roché and Duchamp traveled to New York City in 1916. There, they worked with Beatrice Wood to create The Blind Man and Rongwrong, two magazines that were among the early manifestations in the United States of the Dada art movement.

Roché became the chief advisor to the American art collector John Quinn in 1917 and made many acquisitions for him from 1917 to 1924.

Known for his womanizing, Roché married twice, first to Germaine Bonnard (1927–1948; separated 1933), then to Denise Renard (1948–1959). He had no children with Bonnard. His only child, a son with Renard, Jean-Claude Roche, was born in 1931.

== Later years and writing ==
In his later years, he wrote and published two successful novels. His first novel, Jules et Jim (1952), was published when he was 74. His second novel, also inspired by his life, was Deux Anglaises et le continent (Two English Girls, 1956). Both novels, although written by a man who was quite advanced in age, express a vitality and freshness not often seen in French romantic stories of the time.

The French film director François Truffaut came across a copy of Jules et Jim secondhand. He located Roché and befriended the writer in his final years. Roché died in 1959 in Sèvres, Hauts-de-Seine. Truffaut was so impressed by Roché's two novels that he adapted each of them as films. Truffaut's first adaptation, Jules and Jim (1962), was followed by the earliest English translation of the novel as a Panther paperback published in Great Britain in 1963. Truffaut's version of Deux Anglaises et le continent was released with the trivially different title Les Deux Anglaises et le continent in 1971 (Two English Girls or Anne and Muriel in anglophone markets). The opening credits of the second film roll over images of the novel's cover (Gallimard edition) and internal pages with Truffaut's annotations, in homage to Roché and emphasising the film's debt to its source.

Jules et Jim was inspired by the love triangle involving Roché, the German writer Franz Hessel (who translated Marcel Proust into German, as the character Jules does) and Helen Grund, who married Hessel. It is not based on the triangle involving Roché, Beatrice Wood and Marcel Duchamp, as sometimes suggested in Wood's later years. Roché did, however, allude to the Roché-Wood-Duchamp triangle in his unfinished novel, Victor. Beatrice Wood herself saw little resemblance between Jules et Jim and her relationship with Roché and Duchamp, writing in her 1985 autobiography, I Shock Myself:

Roché lived in Paris with his wife Denise, and had by now written Jules et Jim ... Because the story concerns two young men who are close friends and a woman who loves them both, people have wondered how much was based on Roché, Marcel, and me. I cannot say what memories or episodes inspired Roché, but the characters bear only passing resemblance to those of us in real life! (p. 136)
