= The Chips Are Down (screenplay) =

1952 French fiction book

The Chips Are Down (French: Les jeux sont faits [le ʒø sɔ̃ fɛ]) is a screenplay written by Jean-Paul Sartre in 1943 and published in 1947. The original title translates literally as "the plays are made", an idiomatic French expression used mainly in casino gambling meaning "the bets have been placed", as well as the French translation of alea iacta est. An English translation (no longer in print) was made from the French by Louise Varèse in 1948, and published as The Chips Are Down.

The story is set in Paris, in a setting vaguely suggestive of German-occupied northern France (or perhaps Vichy France) during World War II. The plot concerns two characters, Pierre Dumaine and Ève Charlier. They are predestined to be soulmates, but this destiny is prevented by their premature violent deaths, and they do not meet until passing into the afterlife.

== Plot synopsis ==
Ève and Pierre have never met each other in their respective lives. At the beginning of the book, Ève is very sick, and unknown to her, her husband André is poisoning her in order to marry her sister Lucette and keep the dowry. Pierre, on the other hand, is planning a revolution, but is killed by his friend Lucien. Both Pierre and Ève do not realize that they have been dead for a while. Pierre and Ève realize different truths about their own lives as they walk invisibly as ghosts amongst the living, with the power to interact only with other deceased souls. Pierre and Ève have difficulty adjusting to this powerless condition. They meet each other in line to register at a bureaucratic clearing house for the recently deceased where both of them slowly find out that there has been a mistake in the paperwork. They are surprised to learn that according to article 140, they were predestined to be soulmates.

Successfully appealing their case, Pierre and Ève are brought back to life and given twenty-four hours to show their love to each other, or their second chance at living will be revoked. However, they are each distracted by unfinished business from their previous lives. Because Ève was poisoned by her husband, she wants to convince her sister that he is not a good man. Pierre wants to stop the revolution to overthrow the Regency that he had planned, because in death he discovered the Regent knew about it, and realizes that if carried out, it will result in the massacre of his friends and the end of the resistance.

Unable to explain the unique circumstances in which they acquired their knowledge, they both have difficulty convincing their friends that they know what is the right thing to do. Neither is able to completely dissociate themselves from the things that were once important to them, and they realize that by not concentrating on their love they might be sacrificing their second chance at life.

== Characters ==
- Pierre Dumaine – the leader of an underground resistance movement against the local Regent in the unnamed city in which the story is set. His death was a result of a betrayal by Lucien, another member of the rebellion, and a police informant.
- Ève Charlier – the wife of André Charlier, the Chief of the Militia (Milice). Like Pierre, her death is a result of betrayal. Her husband André slowly killed her by poisoning her drinks as she lay stricken in bed, in order to inherit her wealth and marry her beautiful younger sister for her dowry.
- André Charlier – Ève's husband, the Chief of the Militia, who kills her and is warming up to Lucette.
- Lucette – Ève's sister, who is very naive.

== Analysis ==
Pierre and Ève are permitted to return to the living for the express purpose of falling in love. But in the afterlife they have seen terrible things that they overlooked while living and attempt to prevent these things from occurring, rather than loving one another. After 24 hours, the pair die once more, having accomplished nothing besides saving a young girl, Marie Astruc, whose life Eve and Pierre promised her father (a man referred to in the boutique of the dead) they would improve. While they managed to succeed in their quest to better Marie's life they fail in the consummation of their love. This reinforces Sartre's view that one is condemned to follow one's choices (see determinism), no matter how good or bad. He also shows that it is impossible to know if a choice is right, even if it is done with the best possible motivations. To Sartre, there is no absolute truth or morality. Instead, he suggests in this screenplay that destiny will always win over the power of life.

Sartre shows that though freedom is perhaps an illusion, it is also a necessity. Pierre and Ève realize the absurdity of death as they wander the streets and witness the problems of friends and loved ones after their second demise. They are powerless to help and thus powerless to relieve themselves of their own suffering in reaction to what they see; they are forced to view life, yet they cannot participate in it themselves since they are mere ghosts. All that keeps us from leading useless, fleeting lives is our power and freedom to interact with the surrounding world according to our own choices.

== Film adaptation ==
A film adaptation directed by Jean Delannoy was made in 1947, with Micheline Presle playing the role of Eve and Marcello Pagliero as Pierre.
