= Lexicon of Musical Invective =

Nicolas Slonimsky's work

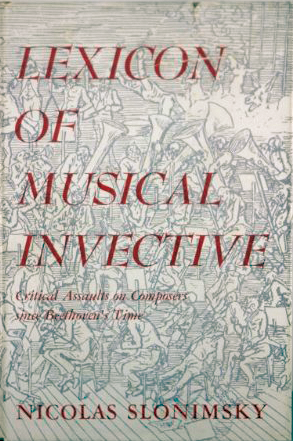
- Original edition cover.
- Author: Nicolas Slonimsky
- Language: English, German, French
- Genre: Anthology, music criticism
- Publisher: Coleman & Ross
- Publication date: 1953
- Publication place: United States

The Lexicon of Musical Invective is an American musicological work by Nicolas Slonimsky. It was first published in 1953, with a revised and expanded second edition appearing in 1965. The book is an anthology of negative musical criticism, focusing primarily on works that later became part of the standard classical repertoire and on composers now widely regarded as canonical, including Beethoven and Varèse.

The material is systematically organized, with entries arranged alphabetically by composer and chronologically within each section. The volume also contains an index titled the “Invecticon,” or “Index of Invectives,” which categorizes recurring critical expressions under thematic headings, ranging from “aberration” to “zoo,” and provides references to the corresponding passages.

The structure of the work highlights the rhetorical strategies and stylistic devices employed in critical writing, including metaphorical language and unconventional comparisons. The juxtaposition of critiques drawn from different historical periods—often directed at works that later achieved recognition—reveals recurring patterns of resistance to musical innovation and contributes to the book’s ironic and often humorous effect.

In a preface titled Non-Acceptance of the Unfamiliar, Slonimsky identifies a central theme of the collection: the tendency of critics to reject unfamiliar artistic developments. A later edition, published in 2000, includes a foreword by Peter Schickele, titled If You Can’t Think of Something Nice to Say, Come Sit Next to Me, which offers a humorous reflection on the work and its implications.

The book has been regarded as a reference resource for the study of nineteenth- and early twentieth-century musical reception. Its entries were extensively used in Dictionary of Folly and Errors in Judgment, a work published in 1965 by Guy Bechtel and Jean-Claude Carrière. A Spanish translation by Mariano Peyrou, titled Repertorio de vituperios musicales, was published in 2016. Concepts illustrated by Slonimsky’s compilation have subsequently been applied in the analysis of critical reception in other musical genres, including popular music.

== Context ==
The Lexicon of Musical Invective developed over a period of more than twenty years and was shaped by the career of Nicolas Slonimsky, as well as by his contact with a number of prominent composers of the early twentieth century. (Note: Slonimsky 1988, pp. 156–157)

=== A Russian musician in exile ===
The October Revolution forced Slonimsky, a Jewish musician born in Petrograd, into exile. In his autobiography, he described the city as "as good as dead" by the summer of 1918, due to the chaos of the final months of World War I and the onset of the Russian Civil War. During this period, widespread violence, including the White and Red Terror, was accompanied by antisemitic attacks and pogroms.

Slonimsky initially traveled to Kyiv, where he assisted the family of the composer Alexander Scriabin, who had died in 1915. There, he became associated with a circle of intellectuals that included Boris de Schlözer. He also founded a “Scriabin Society” with the aim of supporting the composer’s family. During this period, he participated in efforts to locate Scriabin’s son, Julian Scriabin, who had disappeared at the age of eleven; the circumstances of the child’s death remained unclear.

Slonimsky subsequently moved through several cities, including Yalta, Constantinople, and Sofia, before settling in Paris in 1921. There, he worked briefly with the conductor Serge Koussevitzky, which enabled him to establish connections with émigré composers such as Stravinsky and Prokofiev. His professional relationship with Koussevitzky, however, proved unstable, and in 1923 he accepted a position at the Eastman School of Music in Rochester, New York.

=== The American avant-garde ===
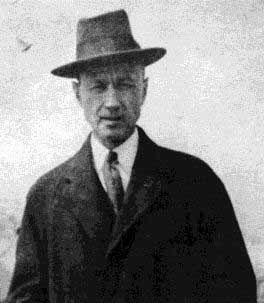
Charles Ives in 1913.

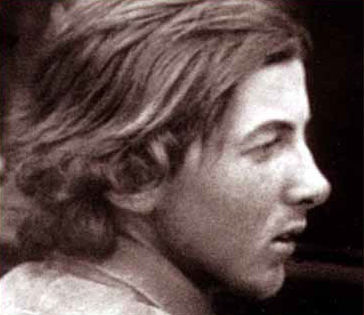
Henry Cowell around 1917.

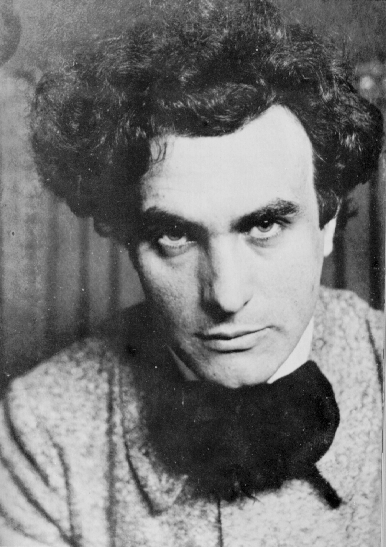
Edgard Varèse in 1910.

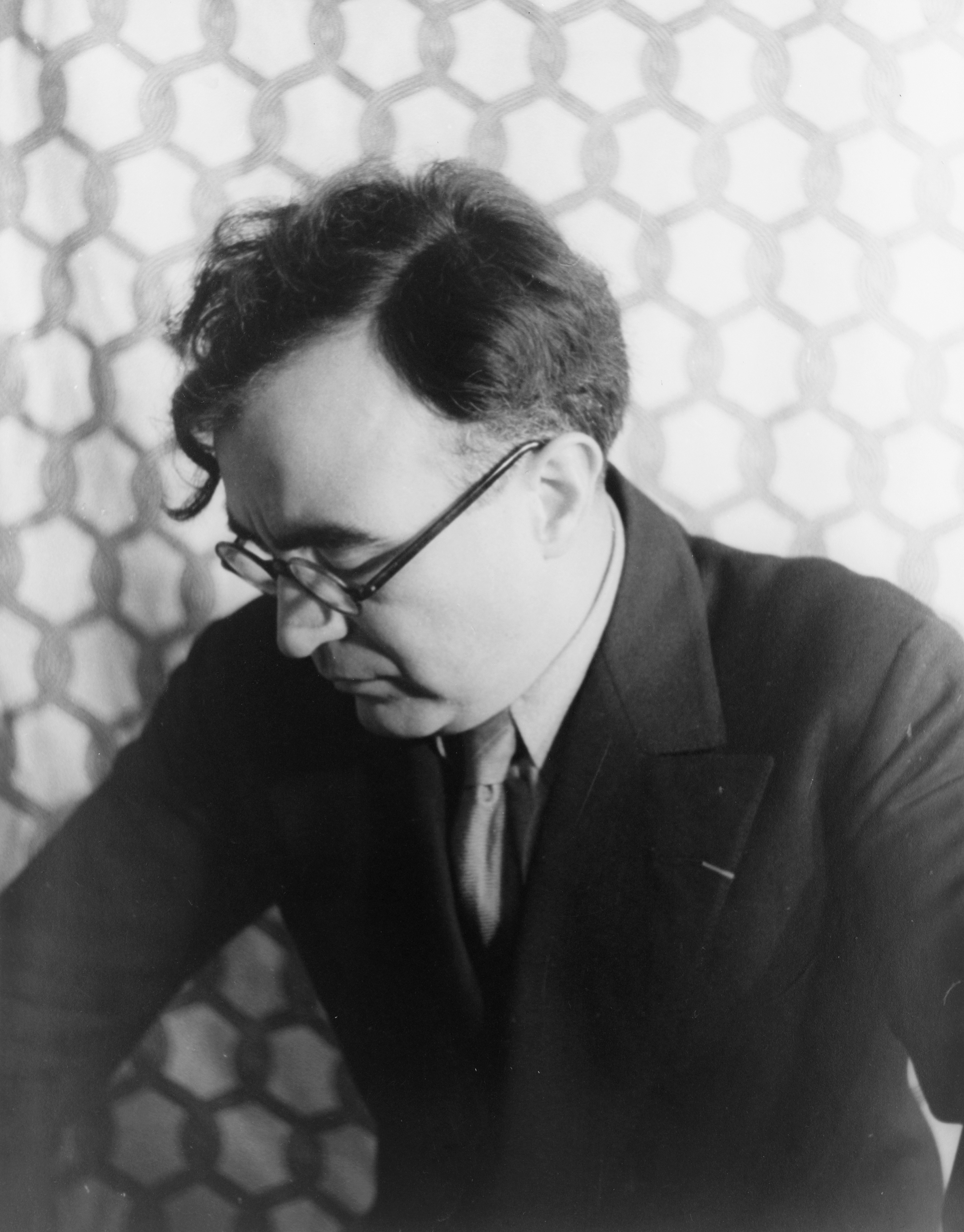
Carlos Chávez in 1937 by Carl Van Vechten.

After relocating to the United States, Slonimsky pursued a career as a conductor, receiving favorable attention in his early performances. This success led to a renewed collaboration with Koussevitzky and prompted his move to Boston in 1927, where he became involved with leading American composers of the period. (Note: Slonimsky 1988, p. 108)

Among his contemporaries were George Gershwin and Aaron Copland, whom Slonimsky introduced to one another. (Note: Slonimsky 1988, p. 116) Another central figure in this milieu was Henry Cowell, who promoted modernist composers in his writings. Slonimsky actively supported the work of composers he regarded as innovative, organizing performances of their music in both the United States and Europe. (Note: Slonimsky 1988, p. 117) (Note: Slonimsky 1988, pp. 116–117)

In 1928, Cowell established a connection with two composers, Charles Ives (Note: Slonimsky 1988, p. 118) and Edgard Varèse, (Note: Slonimsky 1988, p. 122) who had an influence on him. During the subsequent five years, Slonimsky presented the works of these composers in the United States and Europe, along with those of Cowell, Chávez, Carl Ruggles, Wallingford Riegger, and Amadeo Roldán. (Note: Slonimsky 1988, pp. 120–121) Notable concerts included:

- Three Places in New England by Ives, New York, January 10, 1931 (Note: Slonimsky 1988, p. 120) (world premiere).
- Intégrales by Varèse, Paris, June 6, 1931. (Note: Slonimsky 1988, pp. 122–123)
- Arcana by Varèse, Paris, February 25, 1932 (Note: Slonimsky 1988, p. 129) (European premiere).
- Ionisation by Varèse, Carnegie Hall, New York, March 6, 1933 (world premiere).
- Ecuatorial by Varèse, New York, April 15, 1934 (world premiere).

In her biography of Varèse, Odile Vivier observed that the Paris concerts of 1931–1932 were generally well received, although such performances remained relatively infrequent.

=== Concerts and critiques ===
A significant number of Slonimsky’s concerts in the United States and Europe were financed by Charles Ives, who had accumulated considerable wealth through his career in the insurance industry. (Note: Slonimsky 1988, p. 121) Benefiting from favorable exchange rates for the U.S. dollar in the early 1930s, Nicolas Slonimsky organized a series of concerts in major European cultural centers, including Paris and Berlin. These activities eventually led to an engagement at the Hollywood Bowl in Los Angeles. (Note: Slonimsky 1988, p. 137) The venture, however, proved financially unsuccessful, in part because of the conservative preferences of its traditional patrons. Following this setback, Slonimsky abandoned his conducting career and turned to writing, later describing the transition as a move “from baton to pen". (Note: Slonimsky 1988, p. 148) (Note: Slonimsky 1988, p. 141)

Although not all of these concerts involved premieres, they were often of considerable importance. On 21 February 1932 in Paris, Slonimsky conducted Bartók's Piano Concerto No. 1, with the composer as soloist. (Note: Slonimsky 1988, p. 128) The performance and its reception were noted favorably by composers and critics such as Darius Milhaud, (Note: Slonimsky 1988, p. 132) Paul Le Flem, and Florent Schmitt, who published their favorable critiques in Comœdia and Le Temps. (Note: Slonimsky 1988, p. 125) More broadly, the reactions of critics in both France and Germany frequently matched the provocative character of the music itself. In his autobiography (1988), Slonimsky recalled the “extraordinary torrent of invective” elicited by modern compositions, citing in particular a hostile review by Walter Abendroth of a work by Wallingford Riegger: (Note: Slonimsky 1988, p. 131)

It sounds like the noise a horde of rats would make if slowly tortured, occasionally accompanied by the lowing of a dying cow.

— Walter Abendroth, Allgemeine Musikzeitung, Berlin, March 25, 1932 (Note: Slonimsky 1953, p. 142)

Such reactions contributed to Slonimsky’s decision to compile a collection of critical invective, which would later form the basis of The Lexicon of Musical Invective. In 1944, on the occasion of the seventieth birthday of Arnold Schoenberg, Slonimsky presented him with a selection of particularly severe reviews of his works, a gesture reportedly received with humor by the composer of Pierrot Lunaire. (Note: Slonimsky 1988, p. 157)

A further stimulus for the project arose from Slonimsky’s work on Music Since 1900, an extensive chronological survey. In the course of research conducted in libraries in Boston and New York City, he examined numerous nineteenth- and twentieth-century newspaper articles. (Note: Slonimsky 1953, p. 156) Among the examples he later cited was an 1841 critique of Frédéric Chopin published in The Musical World (London), notable for its highly disparaging tone.

In 1948, the collection of musical anecdotes he published (Slonimsky’s Book of Musical Anecdotes) dedicated a section to "pleasant and unpleasant" critiques, selected for their brevity and wit. Examples include concise and ironic observations on composers such as Pyotr Ilyich Tchaikovsky and Chopin."

The following year, Carl Engel introduces Nicolas Slonimsky as a "the lexicographic beagle of keen scent and sight" (Note: Slonimsky 1988, p. 211) in his preface to the Baker’s Biographical Dictionary of Musicians.

== Presentation ==
=== From lexicon to index ===
According to Nicolas Slonimsky, the Lexicon is defined as “an anthology of critical attacks on composers since the time of Ludwig van Beethoven.” Its selection principle deliberately reverses that of conventional publicity practices: instead of isolating favorable excerpts from otherwise mixed reviews, the work compiles negative, biased, or dismissive judgments, often notable for their lack of foresight.

In the introduction, Slonimsky outlines the organization and use of the volume. Composers are listed alphabetically, from Béla Bartók to Anton Webern, with critiques presented in chronological order within each entry. A separate section, titled the “Invecticon” (or “Index of Invectives”), classifies quotations thematically under keywords ranging from “aberration” to “zoo".

Some of these keywords are further qualified by clarifications such as “in music” or “in a pejorative sense.” Slonimsky employs a degree of humor in guiding readers through the index, notably suggesting consultation of the entry “ugly,” which directs to numerous composers and pages, beginning “practically” with Beethoven. (Note: Slonimsky 1953, p. 281)

The author acknowledges that certain critiques were included for their unusual and spicy character, and he does not shy away from seeing Vincent d'Indy, who was the first composition teacher of Edgard Varèse, referred to as the "father-in-law of dissonance"; (Note: Slonimsky 1953, p. 109) Stravinsky as the "caveman of music"; (Note: Slonimsky 1953, p. 201) and Webern as the "Kafka of modern music." (Note: Slonimsky 2002, p. 192)

=== Invective-composed composers ===
The Lexicon of Musical Invective is an anthology of articles dedicated to forty-three composers from the 19th and 20th centuries.

- Béla Bartók
- Ludwig van Beethoven
- Alban Berg
- Hector Berlioz
- Georges Bizet
- Ernest Bloch
- Johannes Brahms
- Anton Bruckner
- Frédéric Chopin
- Dmitri Chostakovitch
- Aaron Copland
- Henry Cowell
- Claude Debussy
- César Franck
- George Gershwin
- Charles Gounod
- Roy Harris
- Vincent d'Indy
- Ernst Křenek
- Franz Liszt
- Gustav Mahler
- Darius Milhaud
- Modest Moussorgski
- Sergueï Prokofiev
- Giacomo Puccini
- Sergueï Rachmaninov
- Maurice Ravel
- Max Reger
- Wallingford Riegger
- Nikolaï Rimski-Korsakov
- Carl Ruggles
- Camille Saint-Saëns
- Arnold Schönberg
- Robert Schumann
- Alexander Scriabin
- Jean Sibelius
- Richard Strauss
- Igor Stravinsky
- Pyotr Ilyich Tchaikovsky
- Edgard Varèse
- Giuseppe Verdi
- Richard Wagner
- Anton Webern

=== Limitations of the scope ===
In the preface to the 2000 edition of the Lexicon, composer and musicologist Peter Schickele raises the question, “Why begin with Beethoven?” After reviewing the author’s arguments, he identifies two principal reasons.

1. First, the expansion of mass-circulation print culture in Europe following the French Revolution altered the relationship between artists and the public, placing critics in a more influential position.
2. Second, the dual Romantic ideal embodied by Ludwig van Beethoven combines the notion of artistic genius shaped by fate with that of an artist in tension with contemporary society. (Note: Schickele 2000, p. xiii)

Schickele also cites remarks by the musicologist H.C. Robbins Landon concerning the premiere of Haydn's Military Symphony. Landon characterized the work as fully integrated into the cultural context of its time, suggesting that audiences immediately understood and appreciated it. Schickele describes this claim as “provocative,” noting that such instances are rare in music history. (Note: Original text: I'm not sure how true that is, but it's a provocative statement.) A similar view is expressed by Guy Sacre, who argues that “it is with Beethoven that the gap commonly observed between artist and audience begins."

Schickele further observes that, even among 19th-century composers, the absence of Franz Schubert from the targets of the Lexicon’s critical excerpts is notable. He suggests that Schubert’s relative neglect by critics in New York and Boston—described as “Slonimsky’s preferred hunting grounds”—may explain this omission. (Note: Schickele 2000, pp. xiii–xiv)

== Examination ==
To preserve musical criticism in its original form, Nicolas Slonimsky adopted a system of “reading keys” rather than thematic classification. This method has been echoed by other musicologists seeking to identify recurring patterns in critical discourse. For example, the French musicologist Henry-Louis de La Grange, a renowned French specialist in the field of Mahler compiled a list of the most frequent criticisms directed at Hector Berlioz in contemporary press coverage.[2] He noted recurring themes, including:

1. Eccentricity and lack of coherence.
2. Perceived ugliness or absence of aesthetic sensibility.
3. A tendency toward excessive scale or “gigantism".
4. Emotional detachment.
5. Technical insufficiency in melody, harmony, and polyphony.
6. A preference for effects described by Richard Wagner as “without cause."

According to La Grange, similar accusations were later directed at Gustav Mahler, with the exception of technical inadequacy. In Mahler’s case, critics instead alleged an excess of technique, interpreted as virtuosity masking a lack of inspiration.

The Lexicon of Musical Invective synthesizes such examples to examine the relationship between composers and critics, drawing on historical reception studies of individual figures. Slonimsky also identifies an earlier precedent in an 1877 compilation by Wilhelm Tappert, editor of the Allgemeine deutsche Musikzeitung. This work, Ein Wagner-Lexicon, Wörterbuch der Unhöflichkeit, collected anti-Wagnerian commentary and is described by Slonimsky as the first lexicon of musical invective limited to criticism of Richard Wagner. (Note: Nicolas Slonimsky does not translate this "interminable" German title for his English-speaking readers.) The volume assembled derogatory expressions used by Wagner’s detractors against both the composer and his supporters, presenting them in a structured format intended for reference and, at times, amusement.

=== "Great masters" as "bad students" ===
==== Impotence and ignorance ====
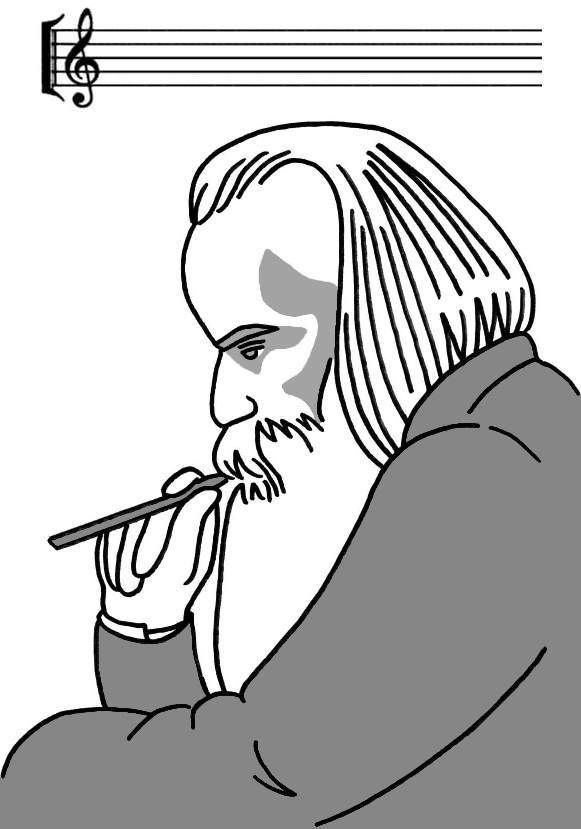
Brahms uninspired... Not without a sense of humor, the composer claimed that "his best ideas came to him in the morning, when he was shining his shoes." (Note: Slonimsky 2002, p. 143)

According to the critiques featured in the Lexicon of Musical Invective, Johannes Brahms is crowned with the title of "impotence": (Note: Slonimsky 1953, p. 268)

Like God the Father, Brahms sought to create something out of nothing... Enough of this sinister game! It will suffice to know that Mr. Brahms has managed to find, in his Symphony in E Minor, the language that best expresses his latent despair: the language of the most profound musical impotence.

— Hugo Wolf, Salonblatt, Vienna, January 31, 1886

The sympathies Brahms arouses here and there had long seemed an enigma to me until, practically by accident, I identified the type of human being he represents. He suffers from the melancholy of impotence.

— Friedrich Nietzsche, 2nd postscript to The Case of Wagner, 1888

On one or two occasions, Brahms manages to express an original emotion, and this emotion stems from a sense of despair, mourning, melancholy, imposed upon him by his awareness of his musical impotence.

— J.F. Runciman, Musical Record, Boston, January 1, 1900, regarding the 2nd Piano Concert, Op. 83.

The author of the German Requiem is not an isolated case; this shortcoming frequently stems from a lack of knowledge regarding compositional guidelines. In this regard, Mussorgsky serves as a prime example of the "musician without musical education:"

His means are limited to a palette of colors he mixes and smears indiscriminately across his score, without regard for harmonic beauty or elegance in execution. The resulting crudeness is the best proof of his ignorance of musical art.

— Alexandre Famintsyn, Musikalnyi Listok, Saint Petersburg, February 15, 1874 (Note: Slonimsky 1953, p. 127)

Such are the main flaws of Boris Godunov: choppy recitatives, disjointed musical discourse producing the effect of a medley… These flaws result from his immaturity and haphazard, complacent, and inconsiderate compositional methods.

— César Cui, Sankt Petersburg Vedomosti, Saint Petersburg, February 18, 1874

Mussorgsky boasts of being musically illiterate; he is proud of his ignorance. He rushes at every idea that comes to him, successful or not... What a sad sight!

— Tchaikovsky, letter to Nadezhda von Meck, January 5, 1878. (Note: Slonimsky 1953, p. 128)

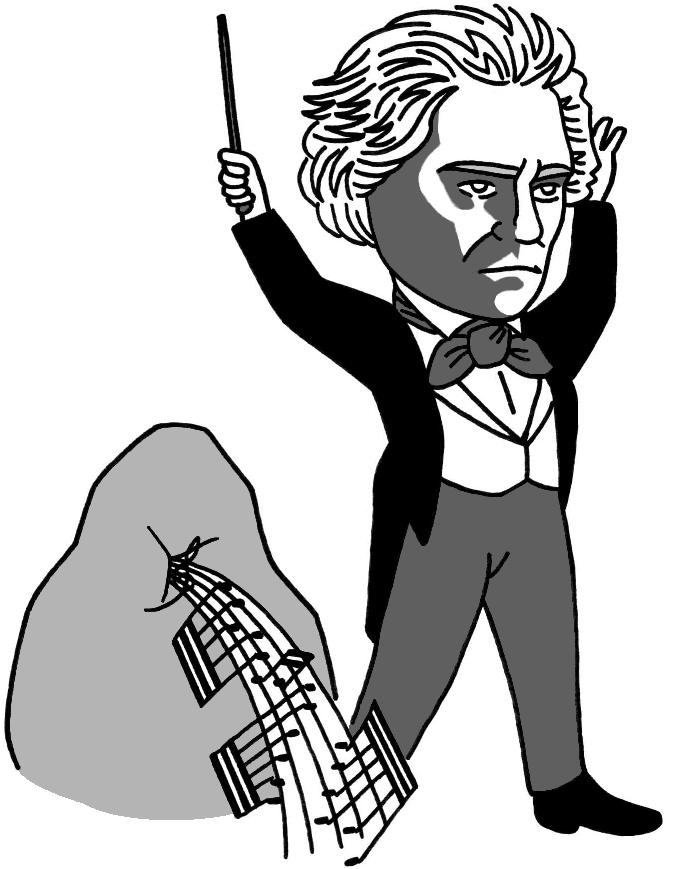
Beethoven, "the troubled spring from which all bad musicians have sprung." (Note: Slonimsky 1953, p. 106)

Conversely, a renowned composition teacher like Vincent d'Indy can see his credentials revoked:

The Symphony (????) by d’Indy seems to us so shockingly excessive that we hesitate to express our opinion frankly. It is evident that all treatises on harmony are no better than wrapping paper, that there are no rules anymore, and that there must exist an Eleventh Commandment for the composer: Thou shalt avoid all beauty.

— Louis Elson, Boston Daily Advertiser, Boston, January 8, 1905, regarding Symphony No. 2, Op. 57. (Note: Slonimsky 1953, p. 108)

Even "good students" are not immune to criticism, suggesting that they have absorbed the pedagogical practices of their "bad teachers:"

Mr. Gounod has the misfortune of admiring certain parts of Beethoven's late quartets. These are the troubled sources from which all the bad musicians of modern Germany have emerged: Liszt, Wagner, Schumann, not to mention Mendelssohn for certain elements of his style.

— Paul Scudo, Revue des Deux Mondes, Paris, March 15, 1862.

Mr. Debussy may be wrong to confine himself to the narrowness of a system. It is likely that his disheartening imitators, Ravel and Caplet, have greatly contributed to turning away the masses, whose favor is so fleeting.

— Louis Schneider, Gil Blas, Paris, February 21, 1910, regarding Images for orchestra. (Note: Slonimsky 1953, p. 305)

The music of Alban Berg is something tenuous, cerebral, laborious, and derivative, diluted within that of Schönberg who, despite his name [literally: 'Beautiful mountain'], is no better than his student.

— Olin Downes, The New York Times, October 29, 1926.

==== Madness and degeneration ====
In many cases, the music critic no longer merely listens but diagnoses a piece presented in concert, offering a genuine prognosis to warn listeners of a disease that might become contagious:

The wildness of Chopin's melody and harmony have, for the most part, become excessive… One cannot imagine a musician, unless he has acquired an unhealthy taste for noise, confusion, and dissonance, who is not bewildered by the effect of the 3rd Ballade, the Grand Waltz, or the eight Mazurkas.

— Dramatic and Musical Review, London, November 4, 1843.

Mr. Verdi is a musician of decadence. He has all its faults: the violence of style, the disjointed ideas, the harshness of colors, the impropriety of language.

— Paul Scudo, Revue des Deux Mondes, Paris, December 15, 1856. (Note: Slonimsky 1953, p. 220)

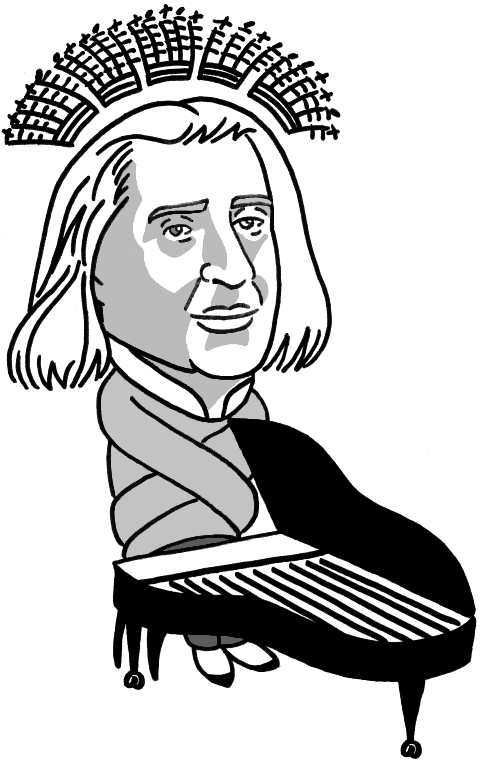
Liszt - Twelve problematic... performance studies.

Schumann's music lacks clarity… Disorder and confusion sometimes invade even the musician's best pages, just as, alas! They later invaded the man's mind.

— Le Ménestrel, Paris, February 15, 1863. (Note: Slonimsky 1953, p. 171)

In instances where a particular affliction appears to be incurable, the Lexicon features an entry under "Bedlam," an appellation derived from the renowned psychiatric hospital in London, among other terms employed to characterize the madness of composers:

If all the madmen of Bedlam suddenly stormed the entire world, we would see no better heralding sign than this work. What state of mind was Berlioz in when he composed this music? We will probably never know. However, if ever genius and madness merged, it was when he wrote The Damnation of Faust.

— Home Journal, Boston, May 15, 1880.

Liszt is someone entirely ordinary, with his long hair—a snob straight out of Bedlam, writing the ugliest music imaginable.

— Dramatic and Musical Review, London, January 7, 1843. (Note: Slonimsky 1953, p. 111)

Even in its most common passages, Strauss constantly inserts false notes, perhaps to conceal their triviality. Then, the savage cacophony comes to an end, like at Bedlam. This is not music; it is a mockery of music. And yet, Strauss has his admirers. How do you explain that?

— César Cui, letter dated December 5, 1904, on Symphonia Domestica, op. 53. (Note: Slonimsky 1953, pp. 188–189)

In the final analysis, critics concede the authority of specialists. In his November 29, 1935 review for The New York Times, Olin Downes notes that Berg's Lulu, with its "thefts, suicides, murders, and a penchant for morbid eroticism," suggests a potentially fruitful subject for study for a "musical Freud or Krafft-Ebing."

=== Culinary metaphors in musical criticism ===
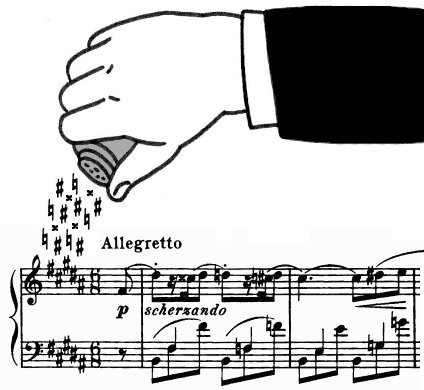
Chopin - a highly elevated 3rd nocturne...

The association of a dissonant key, such as a distant key from C major or a nonchord tone, with a form of "musical spice" is a common trope in musicology. The Lexicon employs culinary comparisons as entries, offering a unique approach to musical analysis: Under "Cayenne Pepper": (Note: Slonimsky 1953, p. 257)

Field adds spices to his meal, Mr. Chopin throws in a handful of cayenne pepper… Once again, Mr. Chopin has not failed to choose the strangest keys: B-flat minor, B major, and E-flat major!

— Ludwig Rellstab, Iris, Berlin, August 2, 1833, comparing Chopin's Nocturnes Op. 9 to John Field's.

Vinegar, mustard, and cayenne pepper are necessary condiments in culinary art, but I wonder if even Wagnerians would agree to use only these to prepare their meals.

— Letter to the editor of Musical World, New York, September 16, 1876. (Note: Slonimsky 1953, p. 240)

Almost all of Bloch's music bursts with curry, ginger, and cayenne pepper, even when one might expect vanilla or whipped cream…

— Evening Post, New York, May 14, 1917.

In a concert review from Cincinnati, May 18, 1880, Wagner's music is described as "more indigestible than a lobster salad." (Note: Slonimsky 1953, p. 242) Nikolaï Soloviev finds Tchaikovsky's Piano Concerto No. 1 a failure, likening it to "the first pancake flipped in the pan." (Note: Slonimsky 1953, p. 205) Paul Rosenfeld compares Rachmaninoff's Piano Concerto No. 2 to "a funeral feast of honey and jams." (Note: Slonimsky 1953, p. 137) After hearing Ionisation at the Hollywood Bowl, conducted by Nicolas Slonimsky, a future musicologist receives the following note:

After hearing Varèse's Ionisation, I would like you to consider a composition of mine for two ovens and a sink. I have called it Concussion Symphony to describe the disintegration of a potato under the influence of a powerful atomizer.

— Anonymous note, Hollywood, June 16, 1933. (Note: Slonimsky 1953, p. 217)

The Lexicon also includes references to strong drinks, or "indigestible digestives":

Poor Debussy, sandwiched between Brahms and Beethoven, seemed weaker than ever. We cannot believe that all these extremes of ecstasy are natural; they seem forced and hysterical; it is musical absinthe.

— Louis Elson, Daily Advertiser, Boston, January 2, 1905, on Prélude à l'Après-midi d'un faune.

Considered as a drug, there is no doubt that Scriabin's music holds a certain importance, but it is entirely unnecessary. We already have cocaine, morphine, hashish, heroin, anhalonium, and countless other substances, not to mention alcohol. That is enough. Yet we have only one music. Why must we degrade an art into a form of spiritual narcotic? What makes it more artistic to use eight horns and five trumpets than to drink eight brandies and five double whiskies?

— Cecil Gray, responding to a 1924 survey on contemporary music. (Note: Slonimsky 1953, p. 174)

==== Animal imagery in criticism ====
Within the domain of sound, parallels between instrumental sonorities and animal cries are frequently drawn by critics, showcasing a remarkable array of zoological references. For instance, in 1948, Nicolas Slonimsky's compendium of musical anecdotes featured a section dedicated to the "Carnival of Animals," which was not related to Saint-Saëns's composition. (Note: Slonimsky 2002, pp. 284–293) Conversely, Prokofiev is often referred to as "the ugly duckling of Russian music." (Note: Slonimsky 2002, p. 198) Liszt's Mephisto Waltz No. 1 has been likened to "wild boar music," (Note: Slonimsky 1953, p. 119) while Bartók's Fourth String Quartet evokes the "alarm cry of a hen frightened by a Scottish terrier." Strauss' Elektra, on the other hand, features "the squeaking of rats, the grunting of pigs, the mooing of cows, the meowing of cats, and the roaring of wild animals." (Note: Slonimsky 1953, p. 193) Finally, Webern's Five Orchestral Pieces are reminiscent of "insect activity." (Note: Slonimsky 1953, p. 249)

Beethoven's thought in the finale of the Thirteenth Quartet resembles a poor swallow incessantly flitting about, exhausting your eyes and ears, in a hermetically sealed room.

— Henri Blanchard, Revue et Gazette musicale de Paris, April 15, 1849.

I can only compare Berlioz’s Le Carnaval romain to the frolicking and babbling of an overexcited baboon, under the influence of a strong dose of alcohol.

— George Templeton Strong, Journal, December 15, 1866.

Composers of our generation aim, in certain extreme cases like Webern’s, for an infinitesimal exploration that might seem, to unsympathetic listeners, like a hymn to the glory of the amoeba...

— Lawrence Gilman, New York Herald Tribune, November 29, 1926. (Note: Slonimsky 1953, pp. 249–250)

The Lexicon comprises entries under the category of "Cat Music" for compositions by renowned composers such as Wagner, Schoenberg, and Varèse, among other expressions associated with feline cries, movements, and habits.

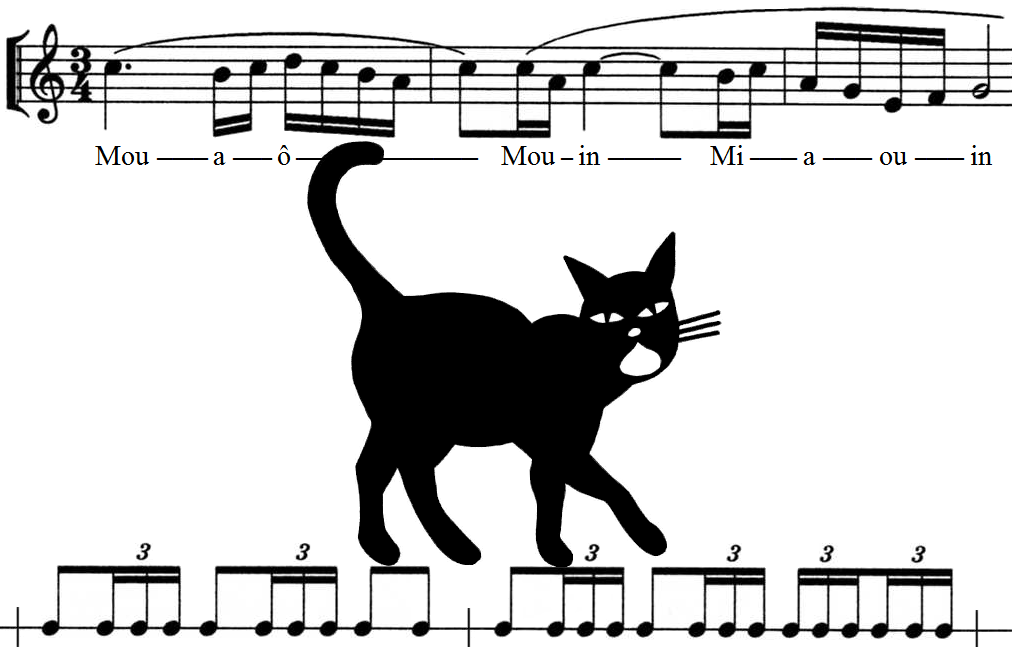
Ravel - an unbuttoned Bolero...

I remember Ravel's Bolero as the most insolent monstrosity ever perpetrated in the history of music. From beginning to end of its 339 measures, it is simply the unbelievable repetition of the same rhythm... with the implacable recurrence of a cabaret tune, of stupefying vulgarity, rivaling in its manner and character the wailing of a noisy alley cat in a dark street.

— Edward Robinson, "The Naive Ravel," The American Mercury, May 1932. (Note: Slonimsky 1953, p. 138)

Thorough integration of musical composition with the vocalizations of animals is exemplified in this analysis of the inaugural performance of Hyperprism:

It seems that what Mr. Varèse had in mind was a zoo fire alarm, with all the appropriate screams of beasts and birds — roaring lions, howling hyenas, chattering monkeys, squeaking parrots — mixed with the curses of the visitors witnessing the scene. This score has, of course, no relation to music.

— Ernest Newman, New York Evening Post, December 17, 1924. (Note: Slonimsky 1953, p. 214)

==== Moral and aesthetic condemnation ====
In some instances, metaphors of taste, animality, or excess proved insufficient for critics, who instead framed modern music in terms of moral deviance or social danger. As Nicolas Slonimsky observed, conservative critics often associated musical modernism with broader anxieties about moral decline and transgressive behavior.

Operatic subjects were particularly susceptible to such interpretations. Giuseppe Verdi’s, La Traviata was described in 1856 by The Times as an “apology for prostitution," (Note: Slonimsky 1953, pp. 219–220) while Carmen was criticized for its depiction of socially marginal characters. Similarly, Richard Wagner’s Tristan und Isolde and Die Walküre were denounced in the French press for their portrayal of erotic and incestuous themes, which some critics considered morally objectionable. (Note: Slonimsky 1953, p. 245)

Certain attacks focus more on the musical content than the subject matter:

There is no need to waste readers' time with a detailed description of this musical monstrosity masquerading under the title of Symphony No. 4 by Gustav Mahler. There is nothing in the conception, content, or execution of this work that could impress musicians, apart from its grotesque nature.

— Musical Courier, New York, November 9, 1904. (Note: Slonimsky 1953, p. 120)

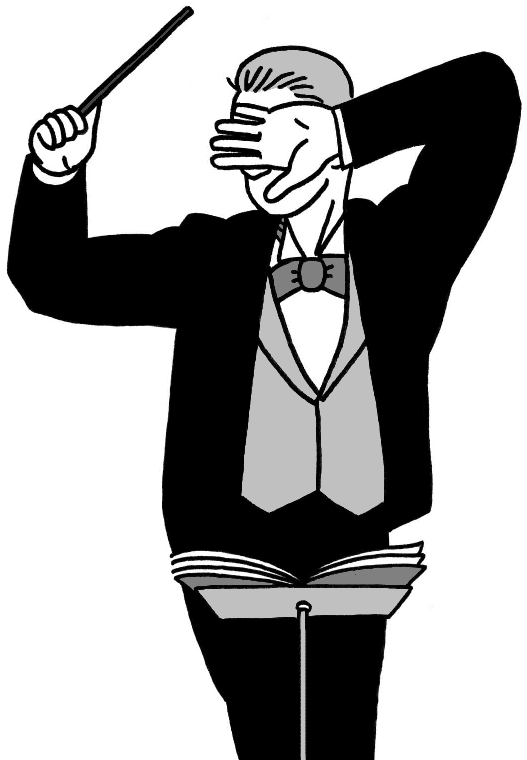
The conductor - "Cover this score that I cannot hear..."

In Thus Spoke Zarathustra, Strauss’ genius is merciless; it has enormous lungs and positions itself near your ear… When you’re awakened by the collapse of an entire city around you, the explosion of a single building using nitroglycerin barely registers.

— Boston Gazette, October 31, 1897. (Note: Slonimsky 1953, p. 183)

Mussorgsky’s Night on Night on Bald Mountain is the most hideous thing ever heard, an orgy of ugliness and an abomination. May we never hear it again!

— The Musical Times, London, March 1898.

In this opera, nothing sings and nothing dances. Everything screams hysterically, sobs drunkenly, writhes, spasms, and convulses epileptically. The classical forms of the passacaglia, fugue, and sonata are employed as mockeries of savage modernity...

— V. Gorodinsky, Music of Spiritual Poverty, Moscow, 1950, on Berg’s Wozzeck.

An American in Paris is a sewer of repugnance, so dull, disjointed, thin, vulgar, and stale that even a movie theater audience would feel indisposed... This stupid two-bit piece seemed pitifully futile and inept.

— Herbert F. Peyser, New York Telegram, December 14, 1928. (Note: Slonimsky 1953, p. 105)

There is no doubt that Shostakovich is at the forefront of pornographic music in the history of this art. This entire opera is hardly better than the crude scribbles of praise you might find scrawled on a men's restroom wall.

— W. J. Henderson, The New York Sun, February 9, 1935, on the opera Lady Macbeth of the Mtsensk District. (Note: Slonimsky 1953, p. 176)

=== Against all odds ===
Nicolas Slonimsky also draws attention to a less conventional form of criticism: the use of verse to express musical judgment. In several cases, critics composed reviews in poetic form, combining satire with aesthetic evaluation. For example, Louis Elson reviewed a performance of Mahler's Symphony No. 5 in Boston on February 28, 1914, with A Modern Symphony in five sextains:

With chords of ninths, elevenths and worse,
And discords in all keys,
He turns the music inside out
With unknown harmonies.
But things like that, you know, must be,
In every modern symphonie.

Major newspapers have been known to publish negative and anonymous opinions in their original form. For example, Strauss' Elektra inspired a commentary in six quatrains in 1910:

The flageolet squeaks and the piccolo shrieks
And the bass drum bumps to the fray,
While the long saxophone with a hideous groan
Joins in the cacophonous play.

It's a deep blood lust and we're taught we must
Gulp it down and pronounce it grand,
And forget the lore when Trovatore
Was sweet to understand.

The reference to the opera Il Trovatore prompts the Lexicon author to recall that the English poet Robert Browning harbored an aversion to Verdi's music:

Like Verdi, when, at his worst opera's end
(The thing they gave at Florence, what's its name)
While the mad houseful's plaudits near out-bang
His orchestra of salt-box, tongs and bones,
He looks through all the roaring and the wreaths
Where sits Rossini patient in his stall.

The tradition of "musical invective in verse" saw its beginnings in 18th-century France and subsequently evolved into an Anglo-Saxon practice in the 20th century, even finding application in educational settings. In these contexts, "musicological poems" emerged as mnemonic tools for students. (Note: Slonimsky 1988, pp. 241–242) In 1948, Slonimsky's collection of musical anecdotes dedicated a section to these exercises, aptly titled "in verse and worse." (Note: Slonimsky 2002, pp. 294–305) He further cited the poem by Erik Satie, renowned for its good-natured and clever jesting, as an exemplar of British humor. The poem's initial two lines have gained considerable renown:

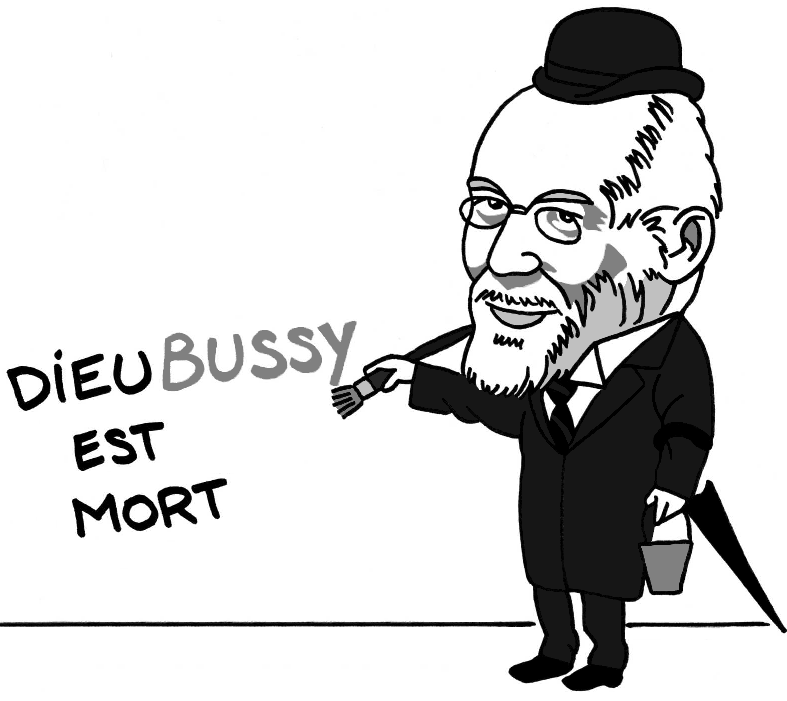
"Erik is Satierik..." - Francis Picabia.

The Catechism of the Conservatoire's Commandments

I. Thou shalt worship Debussy alone
And imitate him perfectly.

II. Thou shalt not be melodic
Neither in deed nor in intent.

III. Thou shalt always abstain from plans
To compose more easily.

IV. Thou shalt thoroughly violate
The old rudiments of rules.

V. Thou shalt compose consecutive fifths
And octaves just the same.

VI. Thou shalt never resolve
Any dissonance whatsoever.

VII. Thou shalt never finish
Any piece with a consonant chord.

VIII. Thou shalt pile up ninths
Without any discernment.

IX. Thou shalt only desire
A perfect chord in marriage.

Ad Gloriam Tuam.

— Erik Satie, signed ERIT SATIS ("It will suffice"), published in La Semaine Musicale, Paris, November 11, 1927. (Note: Slonimsky 1953, p. 103)

== Arguments ==
The Lexicon of Musical Invective is not merely a compilation of negative reviews, but an illustration of Nicolas Slonimsky's central thesis: the “non-acceptance of the unusual” in music. According to Slonimsky, critics across different periods and stylistic contexts repeatedly employed similar arguments, often with little variation over more than a century.

In a deliberately scholarly gesture, Slonimsky formulates several of these recurring arguments in Latin:

1. Argumentum ad notam falsam — the claim that modern music degenerates into noise or incoherent abstraction, lacking intelligibility for the listener.
2. Argumentum ad tempora futura — the assertion that the so-called “music of the future” has no future, and instead represents a regression to primitive or barbaric forms.
3. Argumentum ad deteriora — the idea that each successive composer intensifies the perceived flaws of predecessors, including the loss of melody, harmonic excess, rigidity of form, and exaggerated dynamics.

=== Recurrence and parallel criticism ===
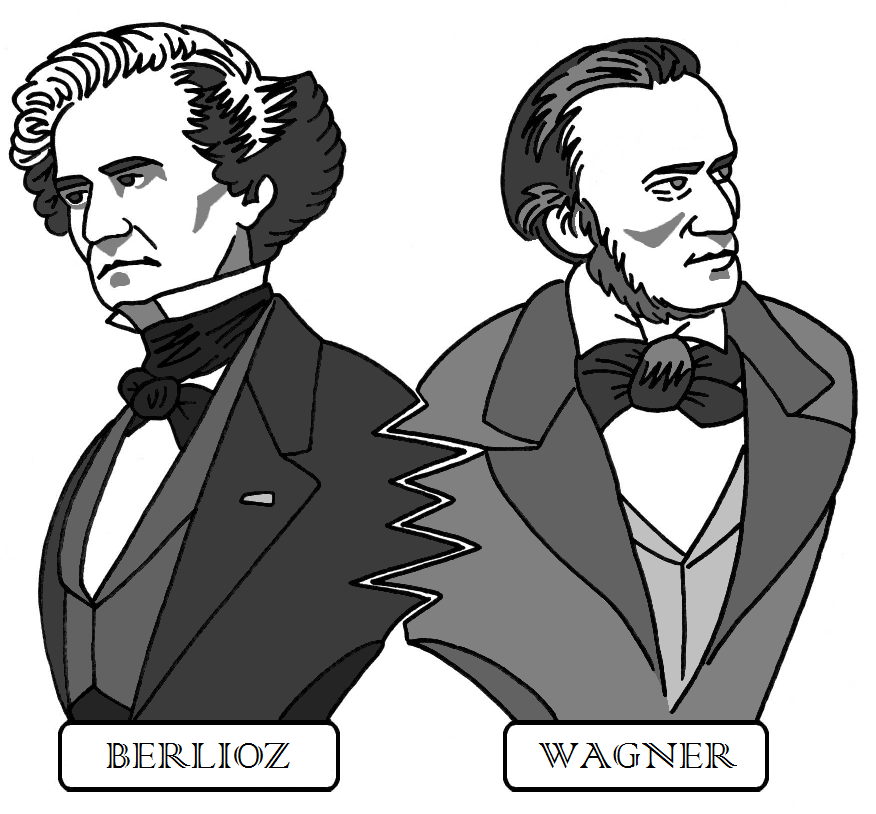
Berlioz and Wagner. Berlioz confided to Liszt: "If we both have asperities, at least our asperities fit together."

A decade apart, critic Paul Scudo employed nearly identical terms to condemn the works of both Berlioz and Wagner:

Not only does Mr. Berlioz lack melodic ideas, but when an idea does come to him, he cannot develop it, because he does not know how to write.

— Critique et Littérature Musicales, Paris, 1852.

When Mr. Wagner has ideas, which is rare, he is far from original; when he has none, he is unique and impossible.

— L'Année musicale, Paris, 1862. (Note: Slonimsky 1953, p. 230)

Beyond what may connect or distinguish two composers, there is more than coincidence here. Virtually all great creators of the 19th century were accused of sacrificing melody:

You know Mr. Verdi’s musical system: there has never been an Italian composer more incapable of producing what is commonly called a melody.

— Gazette Musicale, Paris, August 1, 1847. (Note: Slonimsky 1953, p. 218)

There is hardly any melody in this work, at least in the usual sense of the term. The Toreador Song is about the only 'song' in the opera… and it doesn’t soar very high, even compared to the vulgarity of Offenbach.

— Boston Gazette, January 5, 1879, regarding Bizet’s Carmen.

Slonimsky also notes striking similarities in satirical responses to different generations of composers. He compares two anonymous poems published approximately forty years apart: one criticizing concerts of Wagner's overtures, the other targeting Igor Stravinsky’s The Rite of Spring. Despite their different contexts, both poems employ nearly identical imagery and sound patterns to mock what they describe as chaotic orchestration and excessive dissonance.

From this, Slonimsky concludes that critical hostility toward innovation often follows predictable rhetorical patterns. The near-identical language used against Wagner and later against Stravinsky suggests that what is initially rejected as incomprehensible or excessive may, over time, become accepted or even canonical, while similar criticisms are redirected at newer musical developments.

==== Deciphering the Enigma ====
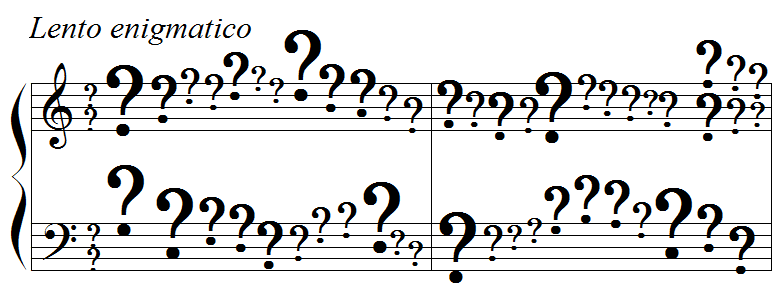
First elements of solfeggio: deciphering...

The Lexicon of Musical Invective highlights the persistent difficulty critics have faced in interpreting complex or unconventional music. As intermediaries between composer and audience, critics often express their inability to understand a work rather than providing insight. This tendency is reflected in the Enigma entry of the Lexicon: (Note: Slonimsky 1953, p. 253)

- Beethoven’s Symphony No. 7, Op. 92, was described in 1825 by The Harmonicon as “conceived as a sort of riddle—we almost wrote: a hoax".
- Nikolai Rimsky-Korsakov’s Antar Symphony was similarly criticized by The Boston Globe in 1898 for orchestration and effects “too complex for us to solve".

Even when comprehension proves elusive, critics attempted to decode the perceived enigma of music, revealing recurring patterns in 19th- and 20th-century criticism.

==== Mathematical analogies ====
Nicolas Slonimsky observes that many professional critics demonstrate limited familiarity with mathematics. Consequently, when faced with intricate compositional techniques, they often equate musical complexity with advanced or abstract mathematical processes. The Lexicon includes entries such as “Algebra (in a pejorative sense)” and “Mathematics (in a pejorative sense),” reflecting this tendency. Examples include: (Note: Slonimsky 1953, p. 270)

- Paul Scudo’s 1852 critique of Hector Berlioz: “Berlioz’s knowledge is abstract, a sterile algebra… he has plunged into the extraordinary… chaos of sound that overwhelms and exhausts the listener without satisfying him".
- Paul de Saint-Victor on Richard Wagner (1861): “To reveal its secrets requires mental tortures that only algebra has the right to inflict. The unintelligible is its ideal."
- The Boston Gazette on Johannes Brahms’s Symphony No. 1 (1878): “This is mathematical music, laboriously crafted by a brain devoid of imagination."
- Louis Elson on César Franck’s Symphony (1899): the work evokes “the machine’s gears… as much emotion as a classroom listening to a professor at the blackboard."
- New York Tribune on Maurice Ravel’s String Quartet (1906): “The composer uses this theme across the four movements… about as warm and nuanced as an algebra problem."

Critics extended these mathematical metaphors to categorize composers by their perceived compositional rigor or abstraction: “arithmetic music” for d’Indy, "trigonometric music" by Brahms, and "geometric music" by Schönberg. (Note: Slonimsky 1953, p. 162)

==== Linguistic barriers and the question of “music” ====
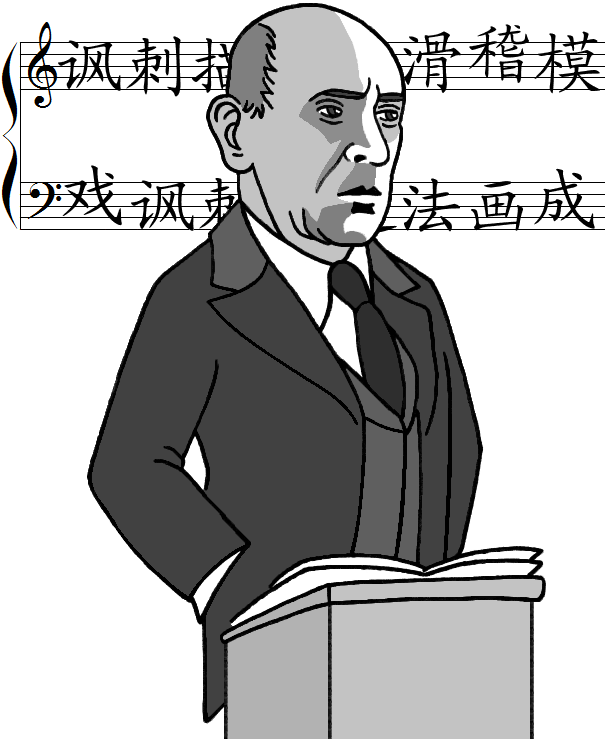
Schönberg - Harmonielehre yet to be translated.

The Lexicon of Musical Invective highlights that critical incomprehension often stems not only from complex compositional techniques but also from the perceived obscurity of musical “language.” Critics frequently equated unfamiliar music with foreign or constructed languages, emphasizing their inability to interpret the work.

For example, a 1935 review of a Arnold Schönberg concert described the experience as “a lecture on the fourth dimension delivered in Chinese.” Slonimsky notes that Chinese, however, was sometimes deemed insufficiently abstruse: critics invoked constructed languages such as Volapük or Esperanto to convey extreme incomprehensibility:

- On Anton Bruckner’s Symphony No. 7, H. E. Krehbiel (1886) referred to the orchestral language as “a kind of musical Volapük… as cold as a math problem.”
- P.-B. Gheusi (1932) likened Darius Milhaud’s Maximilien to the speech of “a communist traveling salesman” capable only of Esperanto and Volapük.

==== Anything but music ====
Slonimsky documents a recurring theme in critical invective: the question of whether certain works can even be classified as music. Critics often employed this argument when confronted with highly unconventional or modernist compositions:

- Alexandre Oulybychev (1857) described Beethoven’s Symphony No. 5 finale as not belonging “to the art I usually consider as music.”
- François-Joseph Fétis (1837) similarly questioned Berlioz’s qualifications to produce music, asserting that his work “does not belong to the art I usually consider as music.”

Other critics extended the critique of “non-music” to composers such as Franz Liszt and Max Reger:

- Liszt’s works were described as “improvisations without order or ideas, as pretentious as they are bizarre.”
- Reger’s String Quartet, Op. 109 “resembles music, sounds like music, and might even taste like music, but ultimately, it is not music.”

The American critic Olin Downes coined the term “ersatz music” to categorize compositions perceived as artificial or vacuous:

- Regarding Schönberg (1935): “All this is empty; it’s an 'ersatz musical,' a substitute for music, on paper and for paper.”
- Regarding Stravinsky’s The Rake’s Progress (1953): “This backward glance… results in an ersatz of music, artificial, unreal, and singularly unexpressive.”

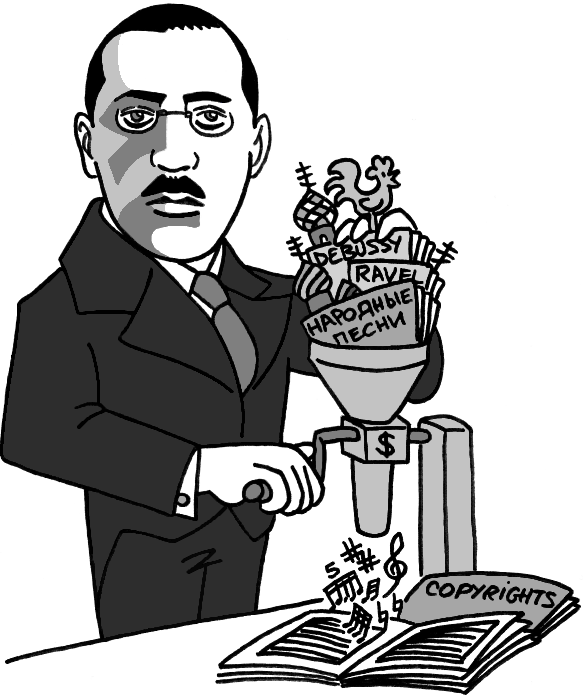
"It seems to me that Stravinsky is trying to make music with non-musical means, in the same way that the Germans now claim to make steak out of sawdust." - Debussy.

=== The Art of Excess ===
In the Lexicon of Musical Invective, Nicolas Slonimsky highlights the ways in which critics characterize musical excess, often using literary allusions to dramatize their disapproval. Anglophone critics frequently invoked a Shakespearean expression from Hamlet (Act III, Scene ii), “it out-herods Herod,” to describe composers whose perceived theatricality or exaggeration exceeded precedent.

Thus, "in La Mer, Debussy out-Richards Strauss," as "Strauss' music, full of diabolically clever effects, over-Berliozes Berlioz' music" (Note: Slonimsky 1953, p. 184) — and so on, since Sibelius' Symphony No. 4 is "more Debussy than the worst moments of Debussy"... (Note: Slonimsky 1953, p. 178)

==== Much ado about nothing ====
Critics with literary sensibilities often invoked Shakespeare’s Macbeth (Act V, Scene v) to frame modern music as excessive yet vacuous:

Life's but a walking shadow; a poor player,
That struts and frets his hour upon the stage,
And then is heard no more : it is a tale
Told by an idiot, full of sound and fury,
Signifying nothing.

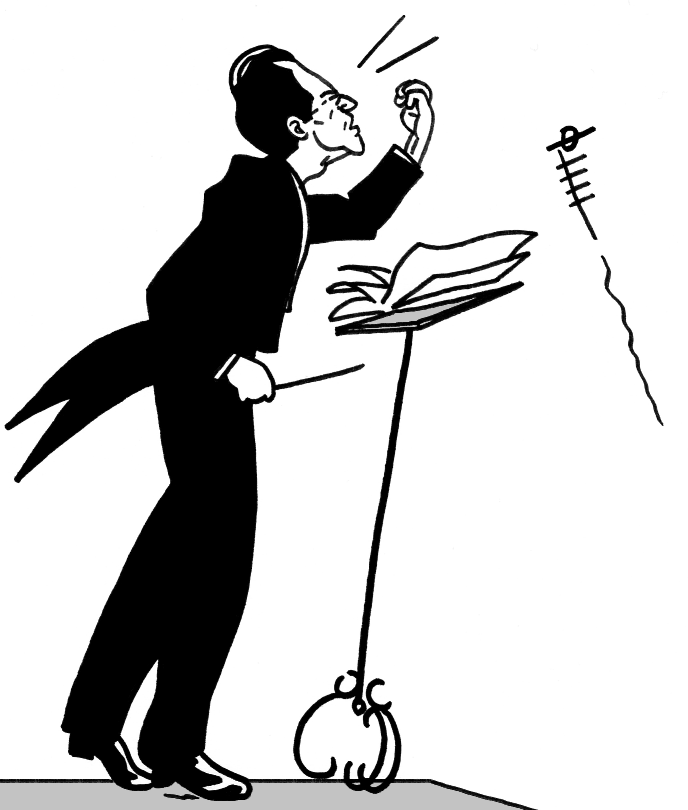
Mahler is good at something..." When I want to obtain a very soft sound, I entrust it to an instrument that can only produce it at the cost of extreme difficulty".

This phrase, “sound and fury,” later inspiring William Faulkner’s novel of the same title, was used explicitly in musical criticism to describe overwhelming orchestration or overblown effects. Two near-simultaneous examples from Boston and New York in February 1896 applied it to Richard Strauss' Till Eulenspiegel symphonic poem: (Note: Slonimsky 1953, p. 181) (Note: Slonimsky 1953, p. 182) (Note: Slonimsky 1953, p. 279)

Overall, it’s hard to summarize this remarkable musical earthquake better than by stating that it’s full of sound and fury, and that it signifies—something.

— Louis Elson, Boston Daily Advertiser, April 27, 1896, regarding Tchaikovsky's 1812 Overture. (Note: Slonimsky 1953, p. 210)

The presence of a jazz theme was a poor choice, but Mr. Copland surrounded it with all the machinery of sound and fury, and the roughest, most modernist fury possible.

— Samuel Chotzinoff, New York World, February 4, 1927, regarding Piano Concerto.

Slonimsky observes a historical pattern in the perception of musical loudness and intensity: “A young music always seems louder to old ears. Beethoven was noisier than Mozart; Liszt louder than Beethoven; Strauss louder than Liszt; Schönberg and Stravinsky louder than all their predecessors combined."

While the majority of invective targets excessive musical elaboration, critics occasionally noted the opposite: insufficient material extended across excessive duration. Gustav Mahler’s works were singled out for this duality:

Mahler had very little to say in his Symphony No. 5, and took an improbable amount of time to say it. His style is ponderous, his material weightless.

— The New York Sun, December 5, 1913. (Note: Slonimsky 1953, p. 121)

==== Unheard music ====
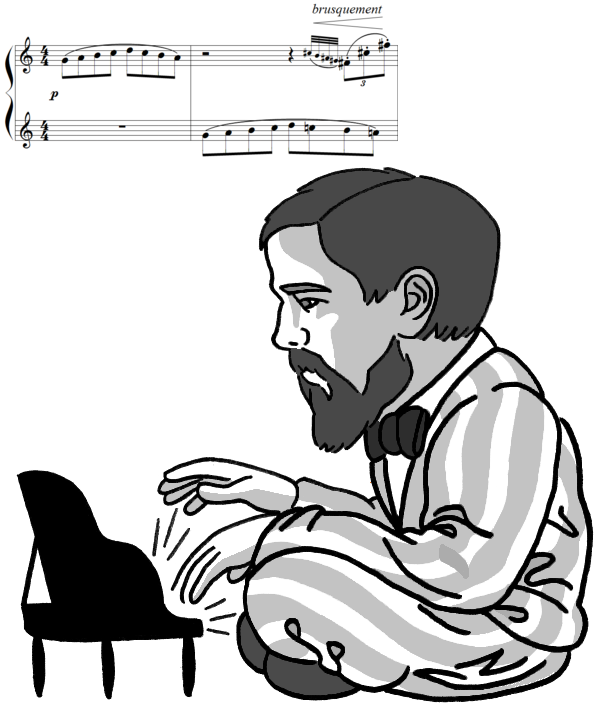
Claude Debussy... in the corner.

At the opposite end of the spectrum from musical excess lies an equally vexing phenomenon for critics: compositions so subtle or restrained that they challenge the listener’s perception, creating a sense of hollowness or vertigo. Nicolas Slonimsky’s Lexicon of Musical Invective catalogs such reactions under entries like “lilliputian art,” often applied to Claude Debussy and Anton Webern: (Note: Slonimsky 1953, p. 269)

This shapeless, unmasculine art seems made expressly for tired sensibilities... something both sharp and sickly sweet, evoking, one knows not how, a sense of ambiguity and fraud... the minuscule art that some naively proclaim as the art of the future and laughably contrast with Wagner’s.

— Raphaël Cor, "Mr. Claude Debussy and Contemporary Snobbery" in Le Cas Debussy, Paris, 1910.

Mr. Debussy’s orchestra seems frail and sharp. If it pretends to caress, it scratches and wounds. It makes little noise, I grant, but a nasty little noise.

— Camille Bellaigue, Revue des Deux Mondes, Paris, May 15, 1902, regarding Pelléas et Mélisande.

The five pieces by Webern follow this highly subjective formula. A long-held note in the high register on first violin (rest); a tiny squeak from the solo viola (rest); a pizzicato note from the cello. Another pause, after which the four performers slowly rise, slink away, and the piece is finished.

— The Daily Telegraph, London, September 9, 1922, regarding Five Movements for String Quartet, Op. 5. (Note: Slonimsky 1953, p. 324)

==== False prophets of "music without a future" ====
From a historical and musicological standpoint, the Lexicon is bound to include the "calls to posterity" articulated by music critics during the 19th and 20th centuries:

It is hard to remain admiring for three full quarters of an hour. This symphony is infinitely too long... If it isn’t reduced, in some way or another, no one will want to play it or hear it again.

— The Harmonicon, London, April 1829, regarding Beethoven’s Eroica Symphony, Op. 55.

There is no need for prophetic gifts to declare that Berlioz' name will be completely unknown within a century.

— Boston Daily Advertiser, October 29, 1874.

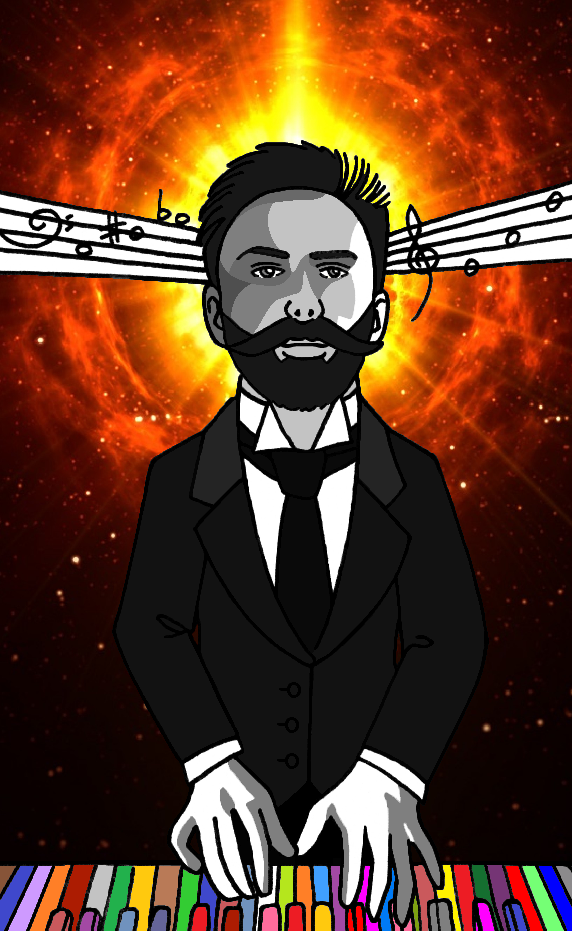
Alexander Scriabine - "Prometheus: the future will keep your promises...".

Rigoletto is the weakest of Verdi's works... It lacks melody... This opera has little chance of staying in the repertoire.

— Revue et gazette musicale de Paris, May 22, 1853.

Is the author of The Flying Dutchman, Tannhäuser, Tristan und Isolde, and Lohengrin opening, as he hopes, a new path for music? No, certainly not, and we should despair for the future of music if the music of the future spreads.

— Oscar Comettant, Almanach Musical, Paris, 1861. (Note: Slonimsky 1953, p. 229)

I propose that Mr. Liszt’s music and all this future music be preserved in vacuum-sealed boxes (like those peas we sometimes have to eat), and that their wills specify that no too-hasty hand reveal these scores before 1966 at the earliest. We’ll all be dead by then—let our descendants deal with it!

— The Orchestra, London, March 15, 1886.

It may be true that the Russian composer Scriabin is far too ahead of people in our generation, and that both his doctrine and his music will be accepted in the years to come. However, we do not claim to be able to read the future, and this music is condemned for the present time.

— Musical Courier, New York, March 10, 1915. (Note: Slonimsky 1953, p. 173)

The audience responded to these moans with laughter and whistles. No surprise! If modern music depended on Webern to progress, it would completely lose its way.

— Musical Courier, New York, December 28, 1929. (Note: Slonimsky 1953, p. 251)

It is likely that much, if not all, of Stravinsky's music is doomed to disappear soon… Already, the tremendous impact of The Rite of Spring has faded, and what once seemed, at first listen, to demonstrate the fiery inspiration of sacred fire has burned out like mere coal.

— W. J. Henderson, The New York Sun, January 16, 1937. (Note: Slonimsky 1953, p. 203)

Concerns regarding the future trajectory of music and its present state of development are the following:

All predictions have been deceived. The pianist E.-R. Schmitz, who was tasked with setting the fuse alight, managed his dangerous exercise in perfect silence. There were indeed a few nervous smiles, a few anxious sighs, a few muffled complaints, but no scandal erupted. Arnold Schönberg will not believe it! The French audience has resigned itself to seeing music slip away from them and has given up on complaining about it publicly… And one remains stunned by the speed with which musical conceptions replace one another, displace and destroy each other; composers like Debussy and Ravel were unable to maintain the revolutionary label for more than a year or two, and now they are already placed in the retrograde camp before they could even be understood by the public.

— Paris-Midi, May 29, 1913, about the Three Pieces, Op. 11. (Note: Slonimsky 1953, p. 310)

== Analysis ==
The Lexicon of Musical Invective is notable not only as a repository of historical criticism but also as a work of wit and subtle humor. Peter Schickele describes it as “probably the most amusing reference work ever assembled” in classical musicology, highlighting two interrelated aspects of its appeal:

1. The inherent entertainment of negativity: Readers are drawn to invective because it is more dramatic and engaging than standard praise;
2. The playful structure of the Lexicon: From its search keys to its thematic organization, the work exhibits a “mischievous and subtle mindset,” with an almost literary craft in the assembly of quotations.

Schickele emphasizes that Slonimsky’s collection should be approached with caution: “Do not swallow all at once; take with a grain of salt." The Lexicon’s entries demonstrate critics’ ingenuity in coining inventive, sometimes hyperbolic figures of speech, capable of demolishing composers’ reputations while revealing broader anxieties about new music.

=== Music and controversy ===
==== Reception of outsider composers ====
In 2022, an American musicologist reflected on historical music criticism, describing a sense of "revulsion toward our musical past" in response to what were considered overtly racist and sexist critiques compiled in the Lexicon of Musical Invective. The musicologist also noted the humor found in the exaggerated and insulting language used to describe musicians and their works, raising the question of the relationship between music and insult and the extent to which criticism could go.

Nicolas Slonimsky observed a marked absence of moderation in many 19th- and early 20th-century music critics, contrasting them with contemporary reviewers who, while often critical of a work, generally refrained from personal attacks on composers. In some historical cases, critics associated composers with racial or ethnic stereotypes. For example, in 1903, James Gibbons Huneker compared Claude Debussy to a gypsy, a Croat, a Hun, a Mongol, and a Borneo monkey.

The phenomenon of assimilating a composer with their music has long been recognized in musicology. In certain instances, this extended beyond aesthetic judgment to encompass cultural or social prejudices. During World War I, an American critic described Gustav Mahler's Symphony No. 8 as "rough and irreverent, dry, Teutonic," (Note: Slonimsky 1953, p. 123) while a German critic in 1909 dismissed Mahler’s music as "repellent because it’s Jewish,"[L 2] illustrating the intersection of musical and ethnic bias.

Richard Wagner is often cited as an early proponent of musical anti-Semitism, a term used to describe criticism or denigration of Jewish composers and cultural contributions within music. Wagner’s 1869 essay Das Judenthum in der Musik ("Judaism in Music") exemplifies this tendency, with critiques directed at composers such as Giacomo Meyerbeer and Felix Mendelssohn.[3] Similar attitudes persisted into the 20th century; for instance, the German musicologist Hans Joachim Moser contributed to the marginalization of Mendelssohn in German musical historiography during the 1920s. (Note: Slonimsky 1988, p. 209)

In 1952, while working on the Lexicon of Musical Invective, Slonimsky was investigated by the Federal Bureau of Investigation for alleged "anti-American activities." (Note: Slonimsky 1988, p. 195) Concurrently, his brother Mikhaïl Slonimsky, who remained in the USSR, was accused of "anti-communist activities." (Note: Slonimsky 1988, p. 196) The investigations by the McCarthy Committee and the NKVD would persist until 1962, resulting in their rehabilitation in both cases. (Note: Slonimsky 1988, pp. 196–197)

Slonimsky was a vocal supporter of Jewish composers, including Arnold Schönberg, Darius Milhaud, and Ernest Bloch,[N 2] and was attentive to biased criticism directed against them. (Note: Slonimsky 1988, p. 130) He had previously been targeted by Nazi German press and faced ridicule from musicians such as Serge Koussevitzky, who did not recognize Slonimsky’s own Russian-Jewish heritagehimself. (Note: Slonimsky 1988, p. 105) The Lexicon contains examples of Slonimsky’s ironic humor, such as a reference to "Hitler (in a pejorative sense)" in an article on Wagner. (Note: Slonimsky 1953, p. 267)

Even when favorably disposed toward a composer, critics occasionally used the composer’s work, persona, or name as a source of playful commentary. On October 27, 1897, the Musical Courier (New York) remarked of Nikolai Rimsky-Korsakov: "Rimski-Korsakov — now there's a name! It evokes fierce mustaches soaked in vodka!" (Note: Slonimsky 1953, p. 144)

==== The irreconcilable opponent ====
During the early 20th century, political ideologies increasingly influenced the reception of certain musical works. The National Socialist German Workers' Party (NSDAP), commonly known as the Nazi Party, explicitly associated modern compositions with political opposition, exemplified by a 1938 concert of what the Party labeled "degenerate music." Nicolas Slonimsky notes that such associations had precursors in earlier music criticism, citing the use of the term degenerate music in an anonymous editorial in Musical Courier as early as September 13, 1899.

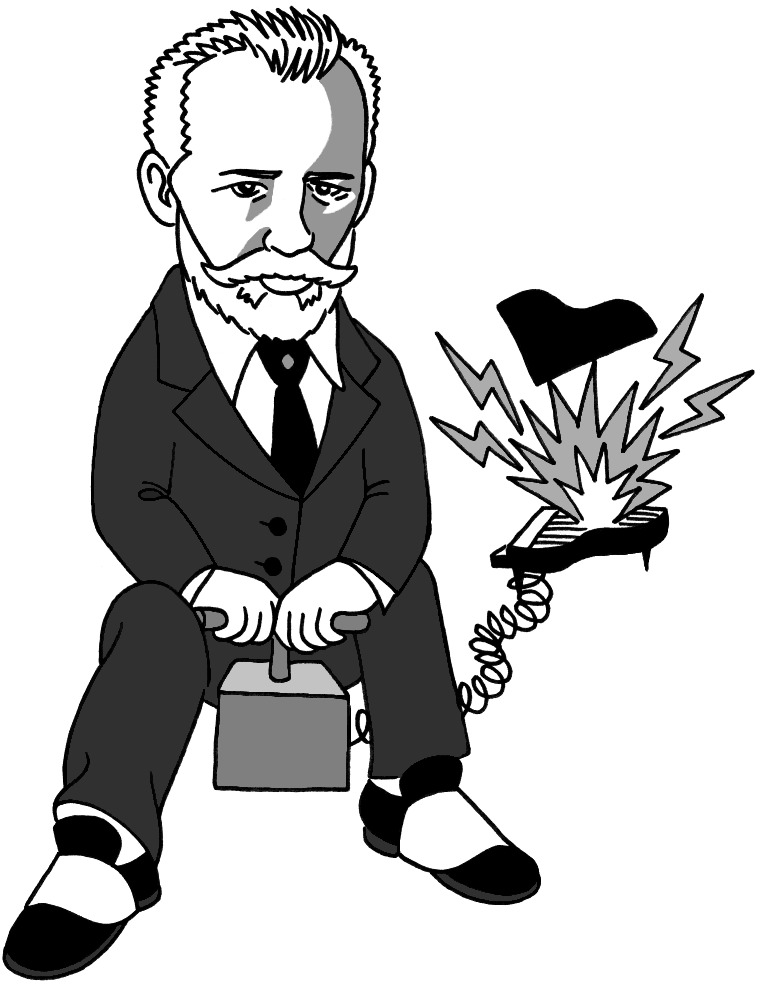
Tchaikovsky - nihilistic rhapsody...

The Lexicon provides several examples where music and political threats are closely linked:

Wagner is the Marat of music, with Berlioz as his Robespierre.

— A. Gasperini, Le Siècle, Paris, 1858. (Note: Slonimsky 1953, p. 226)

Tchaikovsky's Violin Concerto, in its brutal ingenuousness and denial of all formal constraints, sounds like a rhapsody of nihilism.

— Dr. Königstern, Illustrierte Wiener Extrablatt, Vienna, December 6, 1881. (Note: Slonimsky 1953, p. 323)

Rhythm, melody, and tonality are three things Mr. Debussy does not know and deliberately disregards. His music is vague, floating, without color or contours, without movement and without life... No, I shall never agree with these anarchists of music!

— Arthur Pougin, Le Ménestrel, Paris, May 4, 1902, about Pelléas et Mélisande.

Prokofiev is a Bolshevik innovator and a musical agitator.

— Reginald De Koven, New York Herald, November 24, 1918. (Note: Slonimsky 1953, p. 131)

Schönberg is a fanatic of nihilism and destruction.

— Herbert Gerigk, Die Musik, November 1934.

Later examples include audience reactions to Edgard Varèse’s Déserts at the Théâtre des Champs-Élysées in 1954, when an attendee compared him to the French murderer Dominici.

Beyond Europe, jazz music was frequently criticized in politically charged terms: in 1938, the Archbishop of Dubuque described swing as "degenerate and demoralizing," while the Soviet Union banned jazz as "chaotic rhythmic organizations with deliberately and pathologically ignoble sounds." Maxime Gorky saw jazz as "capitalist perversion", and some American writers similarly associated it with spiritual or moral corruption. Conversely, the composer Cyril Scott described jazz as "the work of Satan, the work of the forces of Darkness."

Historical commentary on dance and popular music also reflected broader social concerns. Slonimsky cited early criticism of the waltz, noting that some commentators viewed the dance as excessively provocative and inappropriate for young women, as reflected in a description in the Cyclopaedia of Rees.

=== Criticism of critics ===
In the "Prelude" of the Lexicon, Nicolas Slonimsky cites a letter from Debussy to Varèse dated February 12, 1911, containing "relevant and profound remarks" on music criticism:

You are absolutely right not to be alarmed by the hostility of the public. One day, you will be the best of friends. But hurry up and lose the belief that our criticism is more perceptive than in Germany. And do not forget that a critic rarely likes what he writes about. Often, he even takes great care to remain ignorant of the subject! Criticism could be an art if it could be done under the free judgment conditions necessary. But now, it's just a job... It should be said that the so-called artists have greatly contributed to this situation.

The author also highlights Schönberg's response to the countless criticisms he faced:

I cannot swim. At least, I never swam except against the current—whether it saved me or not. Perhaps I achieved a result, but it is not I who should be congratulated: it is my opponents, those who truly helped me. (Note: Slonimsky 2002, p. 191)

Among the composers closely associated with Slonimsky, Schönberg was known to be particularly critical of his detractors, (Note: Slonimsky 2002, p. 189) while Stravinsky's criticism was often severe, even towards his supporters. (Note: Slonimsky 1988, p. 245) Charles Ives, a renowned composer and critic, believed that criticism serves as a testament to human intelligence. (Note: Original text: "This statement shows almost human intelligence," referring to a review of a Slonimsky concert in 1931 by Henry Prunières, partially translated in the New York Times. (Note: Slonimsky 1988, pp. 125–126)) (Note: Slonimsky 1988, p. 126) Edgard Varèse exhibited an even more pronounced "American" attitude in his interviews with Georges Charbonnier, broadcast from March 5 to April 30, 1955, and published in 1970, characterized by a less spontaneous presentation than in person:

In America, if you are attacked and told your work is bad, you can claim damages. No one would say that a butcher sells bad meat. A critic cannot say that a work is bad. He can say he doesn't like it. I once threatened a critic, whose name I wish to remain silent: 'You will not speak of me. You have no right to attack the personality. Nor to attack the quality of the work. You are not qualified for that. If you insist, I will ask for solfège teachers to examine you.' (Note: In these interviews with Georges Charbonnier, which made listeners wish for "the release of a vinyl record or a mini-cassette that would allow us to hear his warm, vehement voice, reflecting the image of the man," the composer expresses himself in stronger terms: In America, if someone attacks you by saying that your work is bad, you can sue them for damages. It's like saying a butcher sells bad meat. They don’t have the right to say that… They can say they don’t like it… I once threatened a critic—I won’t say their name… I told them: You will not talk about me. You don’t have the right to attack my character, nor to attack the quality of the work. You are not qualified to do so. Because otherwise, I’ll even bring in music theory professors to make you take an exam in court. — "Interviews with Varèse," a program by Georges Charbonnier for French Radio, recorded from December 1954 to January 1955 and broadcast from March 5 to April 30, 1955.)

=== Critical reception ===
Guy Sacre notes that Beethoven's music was initially deemed "incomprehensible," a word frequently used in critiques of the time. In his analysis, Peter Schickele addresses the limitations of some theses presented by Nicolas Slonimsky on this matter: a superficial reading of the Lexicon of Musical Invective might overlook that "Beethoven, while being one of the most iconoclastic composers of all time, was held in such high esteem that members of the Austrian aristocracy spontaneously started a subscription to raise funds for him when it was time for him to leave Vienna, or the fact that nearly twenty thousand people attended his funeral." Likewise, The Rite of Spring is "the only work by a living composer—and indeed, the only composition from the 20th century—adapted for cinema in Fantasia by Walt Disney, one of the most popular producers in the entire entertainment industry."

According to Peter Schickele, an authority in the field, the Lexicon's significant merits lie in its ability to serve as an antidote to the idolization of the great masters. This reverent and prostrate adoration, Schickele contends, is akin to the reverence bestowed upon the masterpieces of classical music, as if they were engraved on the sides of Mount Sinai and immediately accepted as having the force of law.

In a letter written from Berlin, published on November 8, 1843, and included in the "First Journey to Germany" of his Memoirs, Berlioz reports on the true "cult" of Bach's music in Berlin and Leipzig:

People worship Bach, and believe in him without ever questioning that his divinity might be challenged; a heretic would be horrific, and it is even forbidden to speak of him. Bach is Bach, as God is God.

In an interview with Excelsior on January 18, 1911, Debussy articulated a similar sense of autonomy:

I admire Beethoven and Wagner, but I refuse to admire them wholesale because I've been told they are masters! Never! Nowadays, in my opinion, people approach masters with very unpleasant servant-like manners; I want the freedom to say that a boring piece bores me, regardless of its author.

Since "waste exists in all creators, even Mozart, even Bach," Antoine Goléa is not surprised that "it also exists among the 'greats' of Romanticism, but they all have the excuse of having sought, of having advanced, which made their mistakes fatal" and justifies the choice made by Nicolas Slonimsky to start the Lexicon of Musical Invective with the history of Western classical music.

==== Homage or mockery? ====
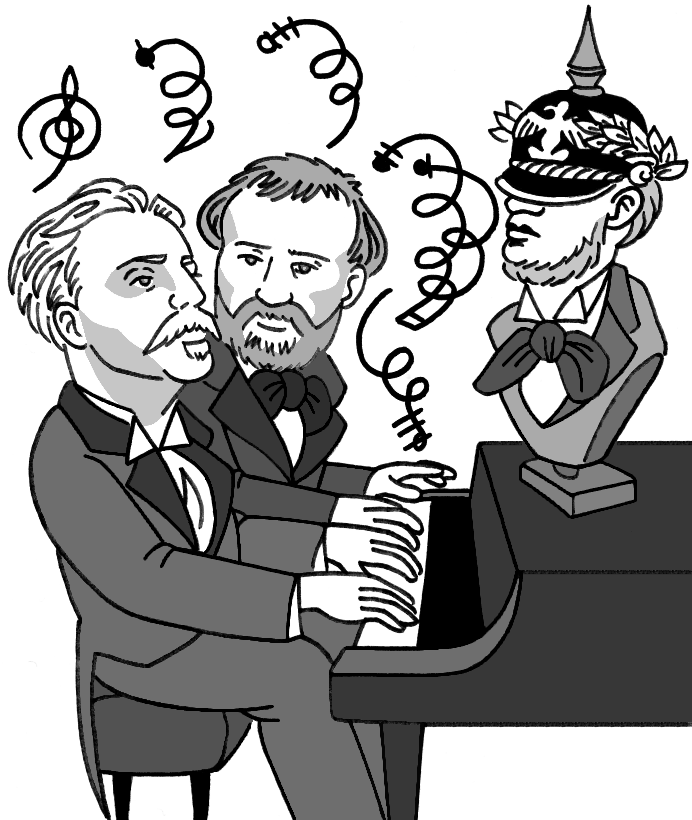
Chabrier, Fauré: "Elective Affinities"...

According to Roger Delage, a specialist in Emmanuel Chabrier's music, "a superficial mind might be surprised that the same man who had sobbed in Munich upon hearing the cellos play the A of the prelude to Tristan composed shortly after the irreverent Souvenirs de Munich, a fantasia in the form of a quadrille on themes from Tristan und Isolde," for four hands piano. This would forget, as Marcel Proust would say, that "if we seek what true greatness impresses upon us, it is too vague to say that it is respect, and it is actually more of a kind of familiarity. We feel our soul, what is best and most sympathetic in us, in them, and we mock them as we mock ourselves."

Exactly contemporaneously, and from a composer embodying "supreme distinction" alongside the "riotous humor" of Chabrier, Gabriel Fauré declared himself "müde [tired] of admiration" before Wagner's Die Meistersinger and "saddened by the weakness of Tannhäuser." According to Jean-Michel Nectoux, "his admiration remains lucid and measured," which he expresses in his Souvenirs de Bayreuth, "a fantasia in the form of a quadrille on favorite themes from Wagner's Tetralogy," composed for four hands piano in collaboration with André Messager.

Gustave Samazeuilh reminds those who may doubt that these two satirical quadrilles, "of the most amusing fantasy," were the "delight" of Wagnerians themselves "in the heroic days of Wagnerism"—to the point of having piano transcriptions created.

Two admirers of Chabrier, Erik Satie and Maurice Ravel, pay him homage in a roundabout way. Vladimir Jankélévitch recommends reading with attention "the harmless parody that Ravel, in 1913, wrote À la manière d'Emmanuel Chabrier." Satie even made a specialty of "parodies and caricatures of an author or a work." To illustrate this practice is the reuse of the piece España in the 1913 work Croquis et Agaceries d'un gros bonhomme en bois by Chabrier.

Musical parodies typically target famous works: Faust by Gounod, parodied "in the second degree" by Ravel—À la manière d'Emmanuel Chabrier presenting itself as a paraphrase on the tune "Faites-lui mes aveux" from Act 3—is also ridiculed by Debussy in La Boîte à joujoux, and Honegger—the funeral march from Les Mariés de la tour Eiffel reuses Gounod's "Waltz."

In certain instances, a composer has been known to direct criticism at both the work and the person of his fellow composer. For example, the Danish composer Rued Langgaard composed a posthumous "sarcastic and desperate" tribute to his compatriot Carl Nielsen in 1948. This piece, titled Carl Nielsen, our great composer, is a thirty-two-bar piece for choir and orchestra, where the text is just the title repeated da capo ad infinitum. In that same year, Langgaard composed a similar piece titled Res Absurda!?, which expresses his dismay as a post-romantic and marginalized musician before the "absurdity" of twentieth-century modern music. Nicolas Slonimsky cites the Ode to Discord by Irish composer Charles Villiers Stanford, which was premiered on June 9, 1909, as an example of a work that critiques, through parody, the modernist trends of his contemporaries in general.

The author of the Lexicon and his commentator, Peter Schickele, shared this sense of ironic musical homage, offering subtle parodies of Wagner's works—such as Le dernier tango à Bayreuth, for bassoon quartet, where the "Tristan chord" is interpreted in a tango rhythm—and especially of Bach. Nicolas Slonimsky dedicates two of his Minitudes to reinterpretations based on the fugue in C minor BWV 847 from The Well-Tempered Clavier: No. 47, "Bach in fluid tonality," subjecting the fugue subject to modulations in every measure; and No. 48, "Bach times 2 equals Debussy," altering all intervals to eliminate semitones and result in a piece in a whole-tone scale. Moreover, Peter Schickele ascribes to an imaginary son of the Cantor of Leipzig (Note: Schickele 2000, p. xiv) an extensive repertoire of ingenious compositions, including Short-tempered Clavier and a Two-part Contraption, drawing parallels to Bach's Two-Part Inventions BWV 772–786.

==== Critical composers ====
Among the French musicians cited in the Lexicon, Hector Berlioz was the first to wield the pen of a music critic alongside that of a composer, a situation he saw as a "fate" in his Mémoires, which Gérard Condé invites us to view not "in a negative light but as a natural consequence, a double-edged result, of his literary education." The author never asserts himself more than "half as a composer," and if it is clear, in hindsight, that he never stopped pleading his own cause, it was like the wolf in La Fontaine's fable, dressed in the shepherd's habit, having to fight "against his readers, these dilettantes whom he put on trial, and these Mr. Prudhommes for whom music is just a noise more expensive than others."

A selection of the author's articles were published in two volumes: Les Grotesques de la musique (1859) and À travers chants (1862). In the former, Berlioz presents his readers with his conception of "a model critic:"

One of our colleagues in the feuilleton had as his principle that a critic eager to preserve his impartiality should never see the works he is assigned to review, so as, he said, to avoid the influence of the actors’ performances... But what gave much originality to our colleague's doctrine was that he did not even read the works he had to talk about; first, because generally new pieces are not printed, and then because he did not want to suffer from the influence of the author's good or bad style. This perfect incorruptibility forced him to compose incredible accounts of works he had neither seen nor read and to express very sharp opinions about music he had not heard.

Nicolas Slonimsky has documented the incident in which Leonid Sabaneïev published a scathing review (Note: Slonimsky 2002, p. 199) of Prokofiev's Scythian Suite in 1916, despite being unaware that the piece had been removed from the concert program at the last minute. This oversight led to Sabaneïev's resignation, which he refused to apologize for. Notably, Berlioz makes a veiled reference to the critic Paul Scudo, characterizing him as "a Jupiter of criticism" and "an illustrious and conscientious Aristarchus." This reference was met with such enthusiasm that Scudo became the sole critic to condemn Les Grotesques de la musique in a press that was largely favorable to the work.

At the dawn of the 20th century, a notable shift occurred in the professional landscape of composers, as Claude Debussy, Paul Dukas, and Florent Schmitt began to assume the dual roles of composer and critic. This development stands in contrast to the more amiable demeanor exhibited by Berlioz, who, according to Suzanne Demarquez, was "quite a good fellow to his colleagues." In contrast, Debussy was renowned for his "sharp tongue as well as a sharp pen" in his critiques.The competitive dynamic between Debussy and Ravel gave rise to caustic phrases that evoke Berlioz's own contentious relationship with Wagner. (Note: Slonimsky 1953, p. 228) However, Debussy's assessment of the Valses nobles et sentimentales, Berlioz's perspective on the Tristan und Isolde overture, and the numerous critiques exchanged between composers, as cited in the Lexicon, (Note: Some critiques are, at times, partially censored in the Lexicon of Musical Invective—such as Rimsky-Korsakov's opinion on Richard Strauss' Don Quixote, expressed in a letter to Taneïev. (Note: Slonimsky 1953, p. 187)) are characterized by Suzanne Demarquez as exemplifying "musician's analysis, knowing what he is talking about." The evaluation of these works is clearly subjective and subject to individual preference.

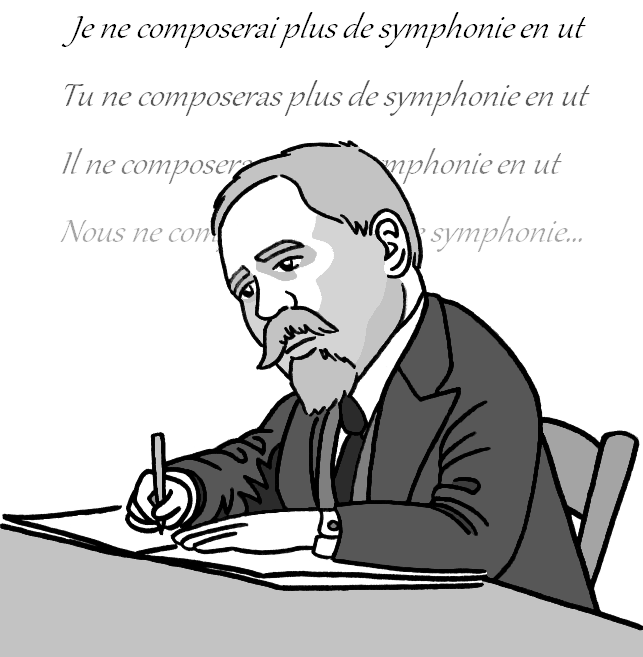
Why Paul Dukas composed only one symphony...

Accordingly, Florent Schmitt's assessment, esteemed by Slonimsky as a "prominent French composer" yet a discerning critic, holds particular significance when he offers his perspective on Hindemith's Concerto for Orchestra on October 30, 1930:

At the second hearing, this concerto definitely confuses me. At once I hate it and love it madly. I love it for its incredible mastery, its virtuosity, its violence. I hate it for its insensitivity, but I fear I love it even more than I hate it because it is inaccessible to me. What one could possibly do oneself has no interest.

The dual role of composer and critic invariably entails "risks," as critics consistently seek opportunities for retribution. A notable example is Mercure de France's censure of Dukas' Symphony in C Major, which he critiqued as a "product of critique." It is akin to a protracted treatise that the critic has imposed upon himself, thereby demonstrating to the musicians whose compositions he evaluates that, in his capacity as a critic, he is not reticent to exhibit his own capabilities."

Composer Charles Koechlin, who often warned his students against "the backbiting that is common at the Conservatoire and the snobbery that characterizes certain musical groups today," readily adopts the terms used by Debussy in his first critical article:

"...sincere and loyally felt impressions, much more than criticism; the latter often resembling brilliant variations on the theme: 'You’re wrong because you don't do as I do,' or 'You have talent, I have none, it can't go on like this...'

— Claude Debussy, La Revue blanche, Paris, April 1, 1901.

In their conclusion, Gilles Macassar and Bernard Mérigaud cite the renowned composer Maurice Ravel's sentiment that "A critique, even insightful, is of lesser necessity than a production, no matter how mediocre." This assertion serves to underscore the notion that music criticism, even when it is of a discerning and insightful nature, is secondary to the creation of a musical work, irrespective of its quality.

==== Critique against critique ====
It is an uncommon occurrence for a professional critic to attack one of their colleagues, despite the fact that they utilize the same terminology to denigrate composers whose musical works they find unsatisfactory. For instance, Olin Downes, esteemed as the "apostle of Sibelius" in the United States, characterizes the music of Schönberg (Note: Slonimsky 1953, p. 163) and Stravinsky as ersatz. (Note: Slonimsky 1953, p. 204) Conversely, Antoine Goléa reduces Sibelius to an "ersatz, both of Mendelssohn and of Bruckner."

This concerto, most great violinists play it because it is well-written for the violin; other than that, it is the absolute musical void, containing not a single musical idea worthy of interest; of endless length, the work goes in circles on the four strings of the violin, with hollow cantilenas and passages of difficult execution but tragically conventional. But it pleases, and it is successful, simply because it reminds everyone of Brahms' Concerto who has no idea of the technical and polyphonic complexity of that work. When composing his concerto, Brahms humbly thought only of following in Beethoven’s footsteps, but in the end, he produced something profoundly original; in composing his, Sibelius probably thought of nothing at all and was naturally carried along in the melodic, harmonic, and virtuosic humdrum of a century, the 19th, of which he was, in the 20th—this concerto dates from 1906—only a sort of lifeless, nerve-less photocopy.

In light of these cross judgments of Sibelius, Alex Ross proposes that Nicolas Slonimsky should have supplemented his Lexicon of Musical Invective with a Lexicon of Musical Condescension, which would have comprised articles and essays of superior intellect in which masterpieces of the contemporary repertoire would be dismissed as kitsch. (Note: Original text: Slonimsky should also have written a Lexicon of Musical Condescension, gathering high-minded essays in which now canonical masterpieces were dismissed as kitsch, with a long section reserved for Sibelius.)

Professional musicologists rarely criticize their colleagues—at least in their articles: a perceptive and mocking author like Paul Léautaud recounts the following anecdote in Passe-temps:

The music critic Louis L... (Louis Laloy) had just published a volume in the 'Great Musicians' series from Laurens. 'I’m quite pleased with it,' he said. 'These works are interesting. The trouble is being in a series with fools like Camille B... (Camille Bellaigue).' L... (Léautaud) said to him: Camille B... may say just as much about you. 'The series is interesting. The trouble is being in the company of fools like Louis L...’

In order to undertake a critique of music criticism, it was necessary to possess the talents of a writer and journalist—or, more aptly, a polemicist—in addition to a certain degree of open-mindedness and "exceptional emotional capacity," qualities that could be found in the works of Octave Mirbeau. Mirbeau, a literary and art critic who infrequently reviewed concerts, vehemently criticized composers he regarded as "blinkered," such as Saint-Saëns, Gounod, and Massenet, while concurrently defending composers who had been overlooked by their contemporaries, including Franck and Debussy. His criticism of critics and musicologists of his era was unabashed, and his columns frequently provoked controversy in the press and public opinion.

In "What One Writes" (Le Journal, January 17, 1897), the author of The Diary of a Chambermaid reverses the roles and takes the place of the critics addressing him:

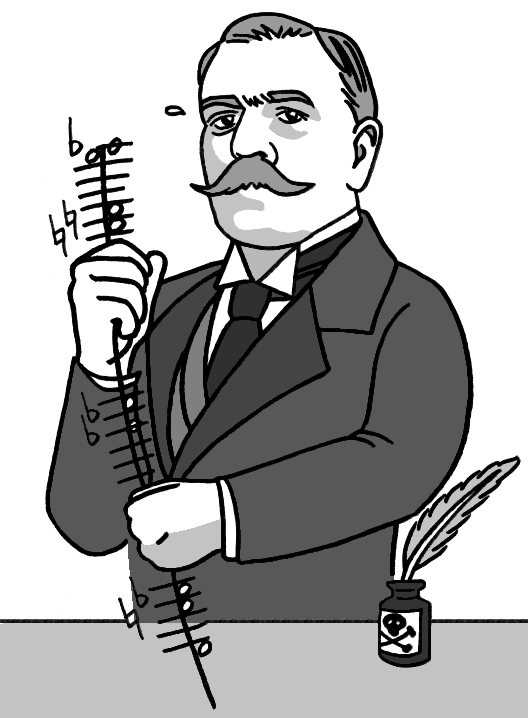
Mirbeau, righting chords...

So, since you yourself admit that you understand nothing about music, why do you talk about it? Baudelaire had that habit too. And the nonsense, the absurdities he spouted—it's hilarious! He also had the habit of talking about painting… Was he a painter? Let’s laugh, let’s burst out laughing!… But you’re not even Baudelaire… you’re nothing at all… And yet you dare to have an opinion about the music of this composer or that one!

Things about which you don’t even know the first thing—and which we, whose very job it is to understand, are not even sure we fully comprehend—these things are capable of moving you? It’s scandalous, and you go beyond the limits of audacity!… Ah! You claim to weep, to feel shivers, tremors, and enthusiasm at certain musical works, yet you don’t even know whether your tears, your shivers, and your enthusiasm are in D major or D minor! What a strange imposture! We, sir, we music critics, have been studying César Franck for over twenty years, and we understand nothing, nothing, nothing!… Is that clear?… And you expect us to believe that you understand something? Tell that to someone else!

And we say this to you as well: "How is it that, for years and years, we have been proclaiming, shouting to the public, for whom we have appointed ourselves educators: Gounod! Gounod!… There is only Gounod!… He is the only genius!" And now, are we supposed to tell this same public: "Well! We were wrong… Gounod wasn’t a genius. It’s César Franck who was, César Franck whom we denied, vilified, or simply buried with our obstinate and competent silence!" Honestly, what would we look like?…

This isn’t about being fair, and, deep down, we don’t care about Gounod—although his vulgarity amuses us and we see ourselves reflected in the poverty of his inspiration;—we don’t care about César Franck either… we don’t care about all of music… But the public, sir, the public!… Wouldn’t it have the right to reproach us for our stupidity?… And what would happen—have you thought about this catastrophe?—if one day it occurred to the public to have the dreadful and inconceivable idea of doubting our competence?

— Octave Mirbeau, Chroniques musicales

In this final point, Peter Schickele raises an objection, considering that in reading the Lexicon, "the lowest amusement—delightful, no doubt, but definitely low—lies in rejoicing with ill spirit over an unfulfilled prophecy: how stupid must one have been to think that Rigoletto had practically no chance of staying in the repertoire?" He further casts new light on this impossible role:

Music critics are not tasked with predicting the future of an art that they follow, as best as they can, in their contemporaries. This flaw is intrinsic to the nature of music. Indeed, buying a score, even an autograph, cannot be as profitable an investment as purchasing a masterpiece of painting, sculpture, or any work of the plastic arts. (Note: Schickele 2000, pp. xi–xii)

In his analysis of the Lexicon of Musical Invective, Jacques Barzun considers this misunderstanding of music criticism as "inevitable. We will fall back into this trap when a truly new music imposes itself on our ears. The only way to escape it would be to renounce criticism altogether."

== Legacy ==
=== Nostalgias of the avant-garde ===
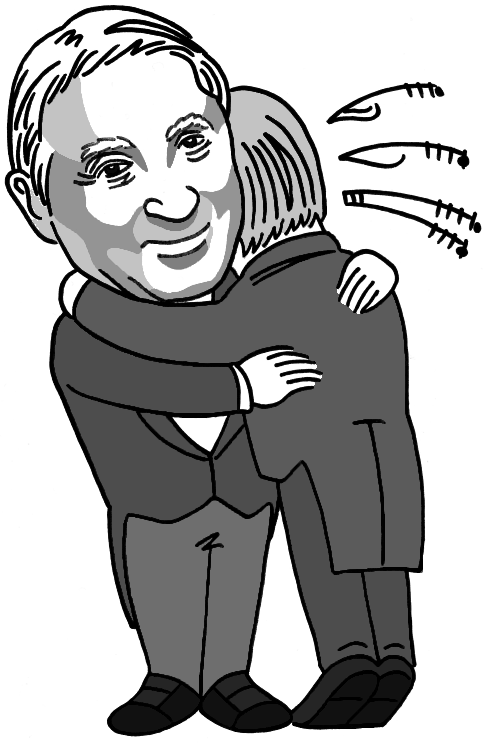
Nicolas Slonimsky consoler.

The book immediately found success in the United States, where it was considered "a humorous classic of anecdotal literature in classical music." Despite its "remarkable influence on the musical world, beyond insult," Nicolas Slonimsky became "the author of the Lexicon of Musical Invective," to the point of considering naming his autobiography Muses and Lexicons. In this text, finally titled Perfect Pitch (referring to perfect pitch), he thus testifies:

The gallery of composers, famous or obscure, whom I know personally is vast and disturbing. I have become a sort of Western Wall for many of them; my left shoulder has been drenched with their tears, saturated with salt—and sometimes sulfur—of their indignation toward an indifferent world. (Note: Slonimsky 1988, p. 244)

The public's apparent insensitivity regarding the Lexicon of Musical Invective's end date offers insight into the decision to publish it. Initially, the book's publication date was believed to be the basis for determining the end date. However, for the 1965 reissue, Nicolas Slonimsky merely added a select number of articles (Note: Slonimsky 1953, pp. 299–325) on composers who were already featured. However, Peter Schickele contends that, "in retrospect, this date emerges as eminently suitable: a mere few years later, in the midst of the 20th century, the era of prominent and renowned classical music composers reached its culmination."

For contemporary composers, reading the book is of unexpected value. In his autobiography, John Adams states, "Blessed be Nicolas Slonimsky for having cataloged the violent reactions from the public or critics attacking one great master after another, in his amusing Lexicon of Musical Invective, so deeply consoling for composers!"

In 2023, American musicologist Richard Taruskin still considers the Lexicon a "great classic," and "the heaviest, most concentrated preemptive guilt-trip ever administered to immunize the new from hostile critique"

Robin Wallace further clarifies the book's influence in concert settings, particularly in radio: "It has become a technique for concert program presenters to cite past unfavorable reviews of recognized masterpieces, to show the current public how much our understanding of music has evolved."

Peter Schickele ultimately discerns that such egregious misjudgments are not confined to classical music. He cites an English record label producer who had initially declined to listen to four emerging musicians named The Beatles, reasoning that "groups are out."

=== Dissonances and resolutions ===
In his Prelude to the Lexicon, Nicolas Slonimsky puts forth a proposal, grounded in his personal experience as a conductor and musicologist, to assess the time required for "acceptance by the public and critics of music unfamiliar to them":

It takes approximately twenty years to transform what was once seen as modernist monstrosity into artistic curiosity, and another twenty years to elevate it to the rank of a masterpiece.

The career of The Rite of Spring offers a compelling illustration of the law of a forty-year lag. Citing the testimony of conductor Pierre Monteux following a resounding performance of Stravinsky's work in Paris on May 8, 1952, which marked thirty-nine years since its 1913 premiere, also conducted by Monteux, the author provides a noteworthy example of this phenomenon. The audience's response, as reported, is said to have equaled the level of enthusiasm of the previous performance, yet it was characterized by a significantly different tone.

This open question regarding the time required for a radically new "classical" music masterpiece to be properly appreciated is referred to among English-speaking musicologists as the "Slonimsky Conjecture." Some contend that Slonimsky's proposal "is not a conjecture; it is History." Guy Sacre cites Beethoven's remark about musical audiences: "They will like it one day." This remark, made in a casual and seemingly dismissive tone, has gained significant recognition.

Peter Schickele further explores this concept, noting that a lack of familiarity with a musical composition is not the sole factor contributing to its disfavor. In fact, the reverse scenario is equally probable, and it may even be more prevalent. Consequently, he posits that a melody that persists in the mind, akin to Strangers in the Night (a personal point of irritation), can be just as exasperating as a concert replete with dissonant harmonies. (Note: Schickele 2000, p. xii)

In the case of composers whose works are frequently performed, unfavorable opinions from established critics or knowledgeable music enthusiasts can be explained as a form of "revolt against habit." Peter Schickele humorously refers to the Bruckner Expressway in the South Bronx, New York, which is supposedly named after Anton Bruckner because it is "long, boring, and leads nowhere." This represents a "lack of appreciation that survives familiarity."

The problem posed by Slonimsky and Schickele is thus as follows: can the work of a "classical" composer still provoke surprise to the extent of drawing the ire of music critics—fulfilling Debussy's wish when he stated, "Indeed, on the distant day—hopefully as late as possible—when I no longer provoke controversy, I will deeply regret it?" Antoine Goléa responds affirmatively and in detail to this question in 1977, focusing on one of the oldest composers mentioned in the Lexicon, right after Beethoven:

In this respect, Berlioz represents a unique case: he is the musician against whom reactionary criticism has never laid down its arms, unlike its successive representatives, who generally, over time, have come to accept those they initially reviled. On closer inspection, this is entirely understandable: in his major works, Berlioz never acquired that famous patina of time that eventually makes even the most revolutionary pieces seem classical. Any good performance of the Symphonie Fantastique still reveals this work in its eternal youth—unwrinkled, yet just as new, and just as unsettling for those minds that seek only comfort and rest in music.

=== A reference work ===
==== United States ====
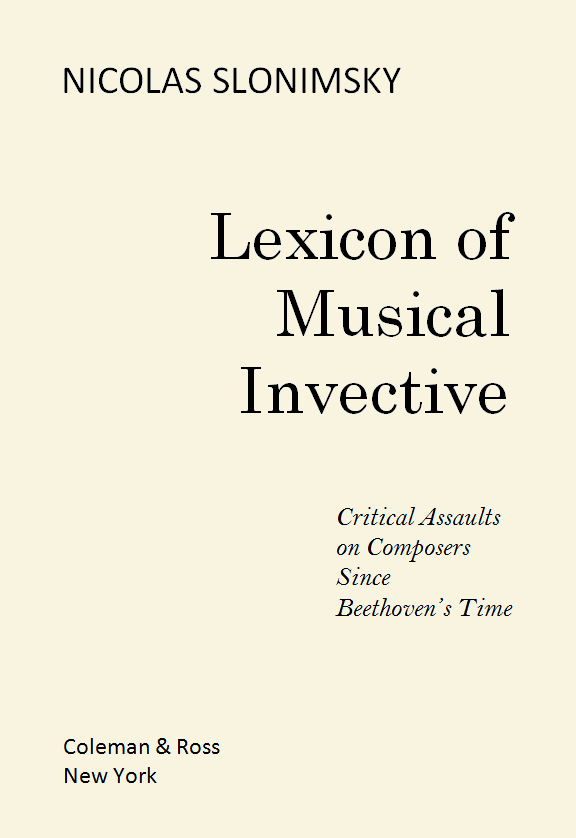
Title page of the original edition of the Lexicon of Musical Invective (1953).

In the United States and the English-speaking world, the Lexicon of Musical Invective is regarded as a foundational work in the field, with a long history of study, citation, and commentary. A recent compilation of musicological research texts (Sourcebook for Research in Music, published in 2005) even assigns it a special place within its reference system. A literary analysis of Thomas Mann's Doctor Faustus elucidates the artistic isolation of the protagonist composer, Adrian Leverkühn, drawing upon arguments presented by Nicolas Slonimsky.

The recognition Nicolas Slonimsky received was significant, as evidenced by the praise he received from Eric Blom in the preface to the 1954 edition of the Grove Dictionary of Music and Musicians. This recognition enabled him to secure the position of editor-in-chief of Baker's Biographical Dictionary of Musicians, a role that involved revising the biographical entries in a new edition published in 1958. (Note: Slonimsky 1988, p. 213)

In the domain of classical music, Henry Cowell incorporated two poems cited in the Lexicon—one that criticized Wagner and the other that criticized Stravinsky—into musical compositions "with a fitting sense of parody."

The theories presented in the book are now being applied to the realm of popular music, including pop and rock. In 2013, in a work titled Bad Music: The Music We Love to Hate, Simon Frith pays tribute to the "everlasting appeal" of the Lexicon of Musical Invective. Following this model, the British critic compares the scandal caused by Bob Dylan's concert at the Free Trade Hall in Manchester to that of The Rite of Spring—describing it as "the angriest audience in the entire history of rock" in 1966. He also references compilations of the Worst Records Ever Made, whose selection criteria mirror the criticisms analyzed by Nicolas Slonimsky.

In a manner similar to Peter Schickele, Frith also examines the phenomenon of overplayed songs, such as "summer hits" and Christmas albums, as well as opportunistic releases, including albums produced in the aftermath of significant events, such as the 9/11 attacks. According to musicologists, the late 20th century was characterized by an accentuated distinction between the roles of critics and producers in the highly competitive domain of pop culture and television.

==== Translations and inspirations ====
In order to "preserve the documentary value of the cited articles," the Lexicon of Musical Invective is written in English. "Reviews written in French and German are presented in their original form, followed by an English translation." However, Russian documents are quoted directly in English in the work, without the original texts in Cyrillic.

The Argentine poet and musician Mariano Peyrou provided a Spanish translation, published in 2016 under the title Repertorio de vituperios musicales.

In that same year, a German anthology was published. Titled Verdikte über Musik 1950–2000 ("Verdicts on Music from 1950 to 2000"), the structure of this anthology was inspired by Nicolas Slonimsky's work. In fact, it adopted a similar format with an "index of verdicts" organized by keywords. The temporal parameters delineated in the title imply that the selected critiques focus on musicians of a more recent era than those encompassed within the Lexicon. This encompasses classical influences such as Beat Furrer, jazz figures like Oscar Peterson, electroacoustic composers like Dieter Kaufmann, pop artists like Tom Jones, and hard rock performers like Alice Cooper.

==== France ====
In 1961, Marc Pincherle recommended to music critics the "fully prepared, brand-new arsenal made available" by the Lexicon of Musical Invective, a compendium of critical writings on music compiled by Nicolas Slonimsky. This recommendation was made in a monograph dedicated to Berlioz that was published in 1968 by composer and musicologist Claude Ballif. In this monograph, Ballif addressed the Lexicon to "those interested in this kind of literature." In 1987, Christian Goubault characterized the Lexicon as an "excellent but harsh work—harsh for critics" in an article on "Debussy and the feeling of Le Mer."

In 2006, the Lexicon of Musical Invective was consulted as a reference in a more extensive analysis of the techniques of invective.

The Dictionnaire de la bêtise et des erreurs de jugement (Dictionary of Stupidity and Errors of Judgment) by Guy Bechtel and Jean-Claude Carrière, published in 1965, drew heavily from the Lexicon for examples of "errors of judgment" in the field of classical music—either by reproducing the same articles published in the press or by directly citing it as a reference work. Unlike Nicolas Slonimsky, however, the authors prefaced each critique with a few words of commentary, highlighting certain keys to interpreting the Lexicon: Beethoven’s music is "a real zoo," Berlioz "lacks technique," Brahms "chose the wrong profession—he should have been a mathematician." Debussy is "subtle, but quite unpleasant," and Liszt is "despised in major capitals... and in the provinces." Although they trace criticism back to Mozart, their approach is similar to that of Nicolas Slonimsky: "For too long, we have been presented with all kinds of beauties while simultaneously being denied the best means to appreciate them."

== Bibliography ==
=== Nicolas Slonimsky's works ===
==== Editions of the Lexicon of Musical Invective ====
- Slonimsky, Nicolas (2000) [1953]. Lexicon of Musical Invective : Critical assaults on composers since Beethoven's time. New York: W. W. Norton & Company. ISBN 978-0-393-32009-1.
  - Slonimsky, Nicolas (1953b). Non-Acceptance of the Unfamiliar. pp. 3–33.
  - Slonimsky, Nicolas (1953). How the Lexicon was put together and who helped. p. 35.
  - Schickele, Peter (2000). If you can't think of something nice to say, come sit next to me.
- Slonimsky, Nicolas (2016). Repertorio de vituperios musicales : Crítica despiadada contra los grandes compositores desde Beethoven [Repertoire of musical vituperation : Merciless criticism against the great composers since Beethoven.] (in French). Madrid: Taurus Ediciones. ISBN 978-84-306-1770-8.

==== Autobiography and musicology ====
- Slonimsky, Nicolas (1988). Perfect Pitch : A Life Story. New York: Oxford University Press. ISBN 0-19-315155-3.
- Slonimsky, Nicolas (2002) [1948]. Slonimsky's Book of Musical Anecdotes. New York: Routledge. ISBN 0-415-93938-0.

=== Other cited works ===
==== Articles dedicated to the Lexicon of Musical Invective ====
- Barzun, Jacques (1953). "Lexicon of Musical Invective : Critical Assaults on Composers Since Beethoven's Time by Nicolas Slonimsky". Music librarianship. 10 (4): 620–621.

==== Around the Lexicon of Musical Invective ====
- Adams, John (2011). Hallelujah Junction : Composing an American Life. New York: Faber & Faber. ISBN 978-0-571-26089-8.
- Ashby, Arved Mark (2004). The pleasure of modernist music : Listening, meaning, intention, ideology, Eastman studies in music vol.29. New York: Boydell & Brewer. ISBN 1-58046-143-3. ISSN 1071-9989.
- Bechtel, Guy; Carrière, Jean-Claude (1965). Dictionnaire de la bêtise [Dictionary of stupidity]. Bouquins (in French). Paris: Éditions Robert Laffont. ISBN 2-221-14579-8.
- Collectif (1969). Contemporary Music and Audiences : La musique contemporaine et le public. Centre musical canadien.
- Crabtree, Phillip; Foster, Donald H. (2005). Sourcebook for research in music. Indiana University Press. ISBN 0-253-21780-6.
- Drijkoningen, Fernand; Gevers, Dick (1989). Anarchia. Avant garde. Rodopi. ISBN 90-5183-114-5. ISSN 0921-2515.
- Frith, Simon (2013). Washburne, Christopher J.; Derno, Maiken (eds.). Bad Music : The Music we love to hate. New York: Routledge. pp. 15–38. ISBN 978-1-135-94683-8.
- Geiger, Friedrich (2016). Verdikte über Musik 1950–2000 : Eine Dokumentation [Verdikte on Music 1950–2000: A Documentation] (in German). Stuttgart: Springer Verlag. ISBN 978-3-476-00146-7.
- Hinson, Maurice; Roberts, Wesley (2013). Guide to the Pianist's Repertoire. Indianapolis: Indiana University Press. ISBN 978-0-253-01023-0.
- Howard, Vernon Alfred (2008). Charm and Speed : Virtuosity in the Performing Arts. New York: Peter Lang. ISBN 978-1-4331-0217-2.
- Kahn, Douglas (1999). Noise, Water, Meat : A History of Sound in the Arts. Cambridge: MIT Press. ISBN 0-262-11243-4.
- Kivy, Peter (2001). The Possessor and the Possessed : Handel, Mozart, Beethoven, and the Idea of Musical Genius. New York: Yale University Press. ISBN 978-0-300-08758-1.
- Lenneberg, Hans (1988). Witnesses and Scholars : Studies in musical biography, Musicology Series vol.5. New York: Taylor & Francis. ISBN 2-88124-210-3. ISSN 0275-5866.
- Mullinger, Lisa Noelle (2013). Nicolas Slonimsky's Role in the Musical Modernism of the Early Twentieth Century (Thesis). Lawrence: University of Kansas. Archived from the original on March 15, 2022.
- Sheppard, W. Anthony (2019). Extreme Exoticism : Japan in the American Musical Imagination. Oxford University Press. ISBN 978-0-19-007272-8.
- Welling, Erich (2014). A Marriage of Philosophy and Music : A Pianist's View. New York: Strategic Book Publishing Rights Agency. ISBN 978-1-62857-411-1.
- Winsor, John (2002). Breaking the Sound Barrier : An Argument for Mainstream Literary Music. iUniverse. ISBN 0-595-24998-1.
- Yourke, Electra (2012). Dear Dorothy : Letters from Nicolas Slonimsky to Dorothy Adlow. New York: University of Rochester. ISBN 978-1-58046-395-9.

==== General works ====
- Berlioz, Hector (2011). Les Grotesques de la musique [The Grotesques of music]. Palazetto Bru Zane (in French). Paris: Symétrie. ISBN 978-2-914373-77-7.
  - Condé, Gérard (2011). Préface [Preface] (in French). pp. 5–20.
- Berlioz, Hector (1991). Mémoires [Memories]. Harmoniques (in French). Paris: Flammarion. ISBN 978-2-7000-2102-8.
- Debussy, Claude (1987). Monsieur Croche, antidilettante [Mr. Croche, antidilettante]. L'Imaginaire (in French). Paris: Gallimard. ISBN 2-07-071107-2.
- Goléa, Antoine (1977). La musique, de la nuit des temps aux aurores nouvelles [Music, from the dawn of time to the new dawn] (in French). Paris: Alphonse Leduc et Cie. ISBN 2-85689-001-6.
- Léautaud, Paul (1987) [1928]. Passe-temps, suivi de Passe-temps II [Passe-temps, followed by Passe-temps II] (in French). Paris: Mercure de France. ISBN 2-7152-1431-6.
- Mirbeau, Octave (2001). Chroniques musicales [Music chronicles] (in French). Anglet: Séguier Archimbaud. ISBN 978-2-84049-270-2.
- Poe, Edgar Allan (2008) [1932]. Œuvres complètes [Complete works]. La Pléiade (in French). Translated by Baudelaire, Charles. Paris: Gallimard. ISBN 978-2-07-010454-3.
- Sacre, Guy (1998). La musique pour piano : dictionnaire des compositeurs et des œuvres [Piano music: a dictionary of composers and works]. Bouquins (in French). Vol. I (A-I). Paris: Robert Laffont. ISBN 978-2-221-05017-0.
- Samazeuilh, Gustave (1947). Musiciens de mon temps : Chroniques et souvenirs [Musicians of my time: Chronicles and memories] (in French). Paris: Éditions Marcel Daubin.
- Serré de Rieux, Jean (1714). Poème sur la musique [Poem about music] (in French). Paris. Archived from the original on January 2, 2022.
- Vignal, Marc (1995). Mahler (in French). Paris: Le Seuil. ISBN 2-02-025671-1.
- Wagner, Richard (1869). Das Judenthum in der Musik (in German). Imprimerie de J. Sannes.

==== Monographs on the Lexicon of Musical Invective ====
- Ballif, Claude (1968). Berlioz. Solfèges (in French). Paris: Éditions du Seuil. ISBN 2-02-000249-3.
- Cook, Nicholas (2017). Music, Performance, Meaning. Taylor & Francis. ISBN 978-1-351-55705-4.
- Hirsch, Lily E. (2022). Insulting Music : A Lexicon of Insult in Music. Palgrave Macmillan. ISBN 978-3-03-116466-8.
- Kivy, Peter (2018). Authenticities : Philosophical reflections on musical performance. Cornell University Press. ISBN 978-1-501-73163-1.
- Meredith, William Rhea; Senner, Wayne M; Wallace, Robin (2001). he Critical Reception of Beethoven's Compositions by His German Contemporaries : "Beethoven's critics : An Appreciation". Vol. 2. University of Nebraska Press. pp. 1–13. ISBN 0-8032-1251-8.
- Perlis, Vivian (1974). Charles Ives remembered : An Oral History. New Haven: Yale University Press. ISBN 0-252-07078-X.
- Ravas, Tammy (2004). Peter Schickele : A Bio-bibliography. Bio-bibliographies in music. New Haven: Greenwood Publishing Group. ISBN 0-313-32070-5. ISSN 0742-6968.
- Ross, Alex (2007). The Rest is Noise : Listening to the Twentieth Century. Bio-bibliographies in music. Farrar, Straus and Giroux. ISBN 978-1-429-93288-2. ISSN 0742-6968.
- Singer, Barry (2021). Ever After : Forty Years of Musical Theater and Beyond 1977–2020. Applause.
- Taruskin, Richard (2023). Musical Lives and Times examined : Keynotes and Clippings, 2006–2019. University of California Press. ISBN 978-0-52-039202-1.
- Tick, Judith (1997). Ruth Crawford Seeger : A composer's search for American music. New Haven: Oxford University Press. ISBN 0-19-535019-7.
- Wallace, Robin (1986). Beethoven's Critics : Aesthetic Dilemmas and Resolutions During the Composer's Lifetime. Cambridge University Press. ISBN 0-521-38634-9.

==== Other monographs mentioned ====
- Caillet, Aude (2001). Charles Koechlin : L'Art de la liberté [Charles Koechlin: The Art of Freedom]. Carré Musique (in French). Anglet: Éditions Séguier. ISBN 2-84049-255-5.
- Varèse, Edgard; Charbonnier, Georges; Halbreich, Harry (1970). Entretiens avec Edgard Varèse [Interviews with Edgard Varèse] (in French). Paris: Éditions Belfond.
- Citron, Pierre (1994) [1963]. Bartok. Solfèges (in French). Paris: Éditions du Seuil. ISBN 978-2-02-018417-5.
- Demarquez, Suzanne (1969). Hector Berlioz. Musiciens de tous les temps (in French). Paris: Éditions Seghers.
- Dömling, Wolfgang (1986). Hector Berlioz und seine Zeit [Hector Berlioz and his time]. Grosse Komponisten und ihre Zeit (in German). Berlin: Laaber-Verlag. ISBN 3-921518-90-3.
- Goss, Glenda Dawn (1996). The Sibelius companion. Westport, CT: Greenwood Publishing Group. ISBN 0-313-28393-1.
- Jankélévitch, Vladimir (1995) [1956]. Ravel. Solfèges (in French). Paris: Éditions du Seuil. ISBN 2-02-023490-4.
- de La Grange, Henry-Louis (2003). Cahier Berlioz, no 77 : "Mahler et Berlioz : du roman musical au chant des sphères" [Mahler and Berlioz: from the musical novel to the song of the spheres] (in French). Paris: L'Herne. pp. 280–297. ISBN 2-85197-090-9.
- Lockspeiser, Edward; Halbreich, Harry (1980). Claude Debussy (in French). Paris: Éditions Fayard. ISBN 2-213-00921-X.
- Macassar, Gilles; Mérigaud, Bernard (1992). Claude Debussy : Le plaisir et la passion [Claude Debussy: Pleasure and passion]. Découvertes (in French). Paris: Éditions Gallimard. ISBN 2-07-053224-0.
  - Les debussystes me tuent ! [Debussystes are killing me!], pp. 28–33;
  - La dent aussi dure que la plume [The tooth as hard as the feather], pp. 38–43;
  - Les supplices chroniques des compositeurs [The chronic torments of composers], pp. 78–79.
- Marceron, Madeleine (1959). Florent Schmitt. Paroles sans musique (in French). Paris: Ventadour.
- Nectoux, Jean-Michel (1972). Fauré. Solfèges (in French). Paris: Éditions du Seuil. ISBN 2-02-023488-2. OCLC 896791.
- Rey, Anne (1974). Satie. Solfèges (in French). Paris: Éditions du Seuil. ISBN 978-2-02-023487-0.
- Vivier, Odile (1987). Varèse. Solfèges (in French). Paris: Éditions du Seuil. ISBN 2-02-000254-X.
- Volta, Ornella (1993). Satie/Cocteau : les malentendus d'une entente [Satie/Cocteau: the misunderstandings of an agreement] (in French). Paris: Le Castor astral. ISBN 2-85920-208-0.

=== Discography notes ===
- Delage, Roger; Barbizet, Pierre; Hubeau, Jean (piano) (1982). "Emmanuel Chabrier : L'Œuvre pour piano". Erato (in French, English, and German). Paris: 10–18.
- Machart, Renaud (2007). "Entretiens avec Edgard Varèse : notes de l'éditeur" [Interviews with Edgard Varèse: publisher's notes]. Ina (Imv075). Mémoire Vive (in French). Paris: 8–11.
- Milhaud, Darius; Orchestre national de l'ORTF (1966). "L'enregistrement des Mariés" [Married registration]. Adès (202532) (in French). Paris: 2–3.
- Nielsen, Bendt Viinholt; Danish National Symphony Orchestra (2000). "Langgaard : La Fin des temps, etc" [Langgaard: The End of Time, etc.]. Chandos (CHAN 9786) (in English, German, and French). Colchester, Essex: 16–21.
- Nielsen, Bendt Viinholt; Danish National Symphony Orchestra (2008). "Rued Langgaard : Symphonies no 15 & 16, Orchestral works". Da Capo (6.220519) (in English, German, and Danish). Copenhague: 3–13.
