= Dorothy Adlow =

American art critic and lecturer (1901–1964)

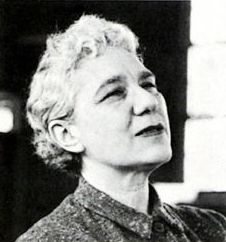
- Born: June 7, 1901; Boston, Massachusetts, U.S.
- Died: January 11, 1964 (aged 62); Boston, Massachusetts, U.S.
- Education: Radcliffe College
- Occupation: Art critic
- Spouse: Nicolas Slonimsky
- Children: Electra Slonimsky Yourke

Dorothy Adlow (1901-1964) was a nationally known art critic and lecturer from Boston.

== Early life and education ==
She was born in Boston on June 7, 1901, to Jewish immigrant parents. Her father, Nathan Adlow, emigrated as a youth from Kazarez, Poland, and opened a furniture store in the Roxbury neighborhood of Boston. Her mother, Bessie (Bravman) Adlow, was born in Dauge, Lithuania. Her brother, Elijah Adlow, eventually became chief justice of the Boston Municipal Court.

Dorothy grew up in Roxbury and attended Girls' Latin School. At her mother's urging, and despite her father's warnings that "if she gets too educated, she'll never marry," she went on to earn a bachelor's and a master's degree from Radcliffe College, graduating in 1923.

== Career ==
After college, Adlow worked briefly for the Boston Evening Transcript before having a 41-year career as an art critic for The Christian Science Monitor. By her mid-twenties, she was a professional success for a young woman of her time.

To supplement her income, Adlow traveled widely, lecturing at colleges and museums and serving as an art juror. In 1930 she lectured at the Carnegie International exhibit series in Pittsburgh, the first woman to do so. She also appeared frequently on television programs produced by the Museum of Fine Arts, Boston, and taught at the Katharine Gibbs School.

Adlow was Boston's leading art critic during the 1940s, when the city's art scene changed dramatically. She regularly attended exhibitions at the Museum School and discussed the students' work with Karl Zerbe. Jean Gibran, wife of the artist Kahlil Gibran, names Adlow in her memoir as one of those who contributed to the "flowering" of Boston Expressionism.

== Personal life ==
In 1931, at the age of 30, Adlow married composer-conductor Nicolas Slonimsky. She kept her maiden name and continued working, providing a small, but steady income for the household while her husband's fortunes fluctuated. Her daughter, Electra, was born in 1933.

Adlow corresponded frequently with her husband, who traveled a great deal. She carefully saved his letters, but her letters to him have been lost. Her daughter published a posthumous collection of Slonimsky's letters titled Dear Dorothy: Letters from Nicolas Slonimsky to Dorothy Adlow (University of Rochester Press, 2012).

She died of a heart attack on January 11, 1964, at her home on Beacon Street in Boston, aged 62.

== Awards and honors ==
- 1947: Honorary Phi Beta Kappa membership, Radcliffe College
- 1953: Art Critic Award, American Federation of Arts
- 1957: Art Citation of Merit, Boston University

A room is named in her honor at Hilles Library, Radcliffe College.
