= Nicolas Slonimsky =

Russian-American musicologist (1894–1995)

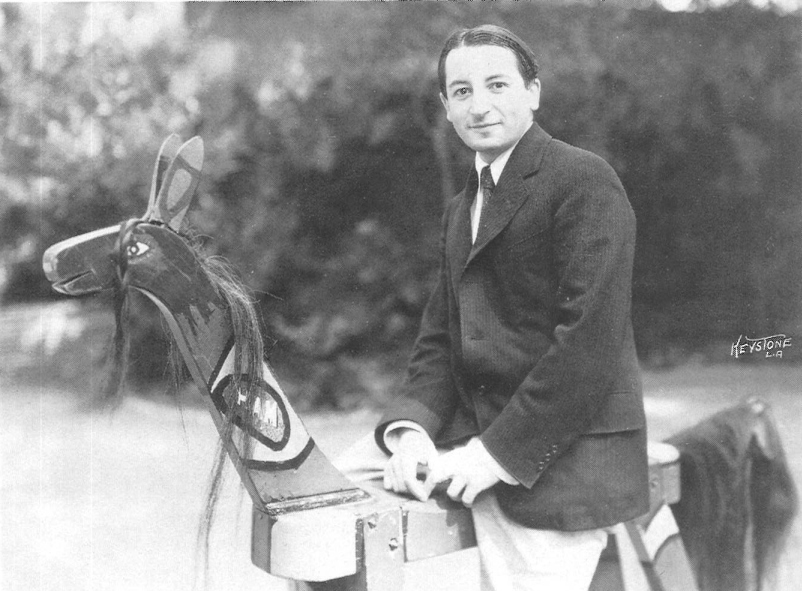
Slonimsky in 1933

Nicolas Slonimsky (April 27 [O.S. April 15], 1894 – December 25, 1995), born Nikolai Leonidovich Slonimskiy (Russian: Николай Леонидович Слoнимский), was a Russian-American musicologist, conductor, pianist, lexicographer, and composer. Best known for his writing and musical reference work, he wrote the Thesaurus of Scales and Melodic Patterns and the Lexicon of Musical Invective, and edited Baker's Biographical Dictionary of Musicians.

== Biography ==
=== Early life in Russia and Europe ===
Slonimsky was born Nikolai Leonidovich Slonimskiy in Saint Petersburg. He was of Jewish origin; his grandfather was Rabbi Chaim Zelig Slonimsky. His parents adopted the Orthodox faith after the birth of his older brother, and Nicolas was baptized in the Russian Orthodox Church. His maternal aunt, Isabelle Vengerova, later a founder of Philadelphia's Curtis Institute of Music, was his first piano teacher.

He grew up in the intelligentsia. After the Russian Revolution of 1917, he moved south, first to Kiev, then to Constantinople, and ultimately to Paris, where many other Russian musicians and his sister Yulia Slonimskaya Sazonova had already fled. He worked as accompanist to the conductor Serge Koussevitzky, and he toured Europe in 1921–22 as accompanist to tenor Vladimir Rosing. In 1923, Rosing became director of opera at the Eastman School of Music in Rochester, New York, and he invited Slonimsky to join him.

Slonimsky's younger brother, Mikhail, remained in Russia and became an author. His nephew, Sergei Slonimsky, became a composer.

=== Conducting career ===
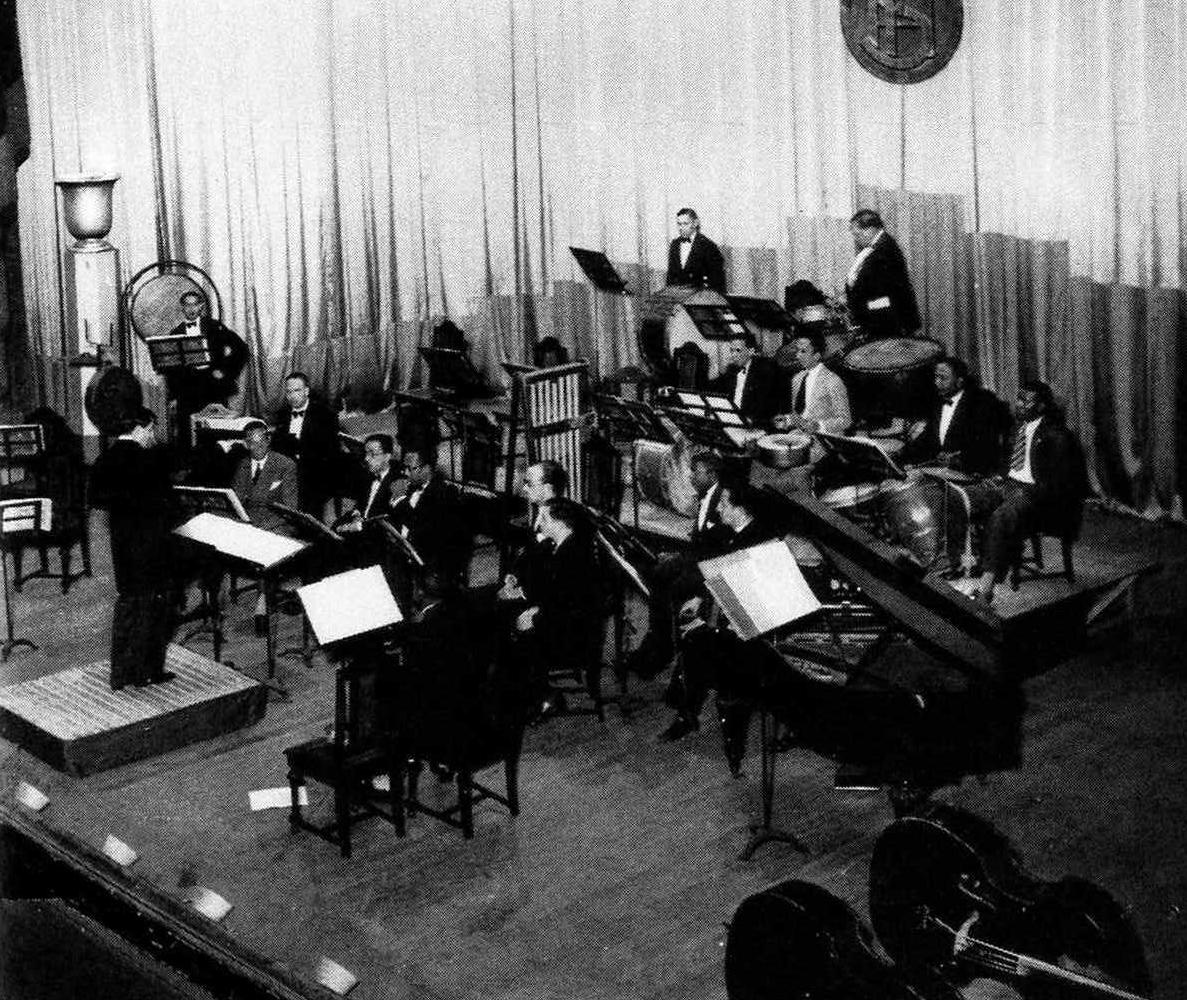
Slonimsky conducting Varèse's Ionisation in Havana

In Rochester, Slonimsky continued his composition and conducting studies with Albert Coates and Eugene Goossens, and accompanied Rosing at many vocal recitals, including a performance at Carnegie Hall in October 1924. After two years, he moved to Boston, where Koussevitzky had become conductor of the Boston Symphony Orchestra, and resumed his position as his pianist and now bilingual secretary. During this time, Slonimsky taught music theory at the Boston Conservatory and the Malkin Conservatory, and began to write music articles for The Boston Evening Transcript, The Christian Science Monitor, and the magazine The Etude.

Slonimsky began writing songs and other incidental pieces, and performed as a piano soloist and vocal accompanist. In 1927, he formed the Boston Chamber Orchestra, for which he solicited music from contemporary composers. Slonimsky was a great champion of contemporary music, and through his interest in performing it met Henry Cowell and Charles Ives. He conducted the world premieres of Ives' Three Places in New England in 1931 (in New York's Town Hall), Edgard Varèse's Ionisation for thirteen percussionists in 1933, and various other works.

In 1931, Slonimsky married Dorothy Adlow, art critic of The Christian Science Monitor. She was active as a critic and lectured extensively around the U.S., serving on panels and art juries. They married in Paris, with Varèse as the best man. Their daughter, Electra, later edited his letters and collected works. (Note: Some of his letters, books, photos, sheet music and recordings are maintained at slonimsky.net.)

In 1932, Slonimsky conducted a series of concerts in Havana highlighting Ives, Ruggles, Cowell, Amadeo Roldán and Alejandro García Caturla. He then traveled to Paris, Berlin and Budapest to conduct further concerts. He mentioned at the time, he found conducting to be "the nearest approximation to music in motion". Thanks to the popularity of these tours, he was invited to conduct five concerts in the Hollywood Bowl in the summer of 1933. These were controversial and received mixed critical reviews.

=== Writings and musical criticism ===
Throughout his life, Slonimsky wrote extensively for periodicals and newspapers, produced program and liner notes, and contributed to numerous reference works. He described himself as a "diaskeuast" (from Greek διασκευαστής), a "reviser or interpolator". When his conducting career slowed, he spent more time writing about music. He produced the chronology Music Since 1900, and later after travelling in Latin America, produced the first thorough coverage in English, Music of Latin America. In 1947 he published the Thesaurus of Scales and Melodic Patterns, which would later become one of his most influential works as a sourcebook for composers and performers. The book influenced many jazz musicians and composers, including Allan Holdsworth, John Coltrane, Frank Zappa, Paul Grabowsky, and Steve Rochinski, and remained in print 60 years later, but was largely ignored for years after its publication. Quincy Jones said in a February 2018 interview: "Every time I used to see Coltrane, he'd have Nicolas Slonimsky's book."

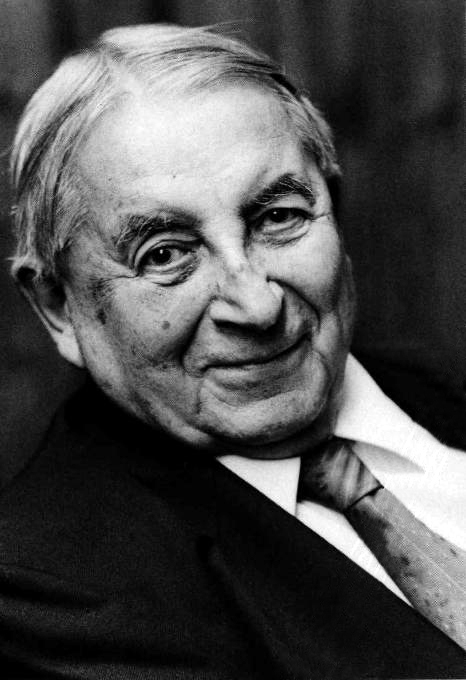
Slonimsky, 1990s

Two books for children followed, The Road to Music and A Thing or Two About Music, with jokes, anecdotes and puzzles. Then in 1953, Slonimsky brought out the Lexicon of Musical Invective ("Critical Assaults on Composers since Beethoven's Time"), a collection of hilariously scathing, insulting, vituperative, and enraged contemporary critiques of musical greats in their time. In 1958, he became editor of Baker's Biographical Dictionary of Musicians, developing a reputation for factual accuracy, and remained its head editor until 1992.

=== Later life and work ===
In 1964 Slonimsky's wife died and he moved to Los Angeles. He taught at UCLA for three years and lectured and spoke about music, introducing himself to classes by spelling out his name: "Slonimsky. S–L–O as in 'slow', N–I–M as in 'nimble', S–K–Y as in 'sky'." He possessed a sly sense of humor, and was a regular guest on radio and television programs, including Johnny Carson's Tonight Show. New York public television station WNET filmed an interview with him for the "Aging" segment of the PBS series The Mind.

He became a friend of avant-garde composer and rock guitarist Frank Zappa, and performed some of his own compositions at a Zappa concert in Santa Monica, California, in 1981. He named his cat Grody-to-the-Max after learning the phrase from Zappa's daughter Moon Zappa.

Slonimsky wrote the Lectionary of Music as a "reading dictionary," as he called it. Then in 1988, he published his autobiography, Perfect Pitch, filled with anecdotes about 20th century musical figures, including his mentors and colleagues.

For his 98th birthday, he visited Saint Petersburg to participate in a music festival. A documentary of his life, including video of this visit, A Touch of Genius, was broadcast by Film America on his 100th birthday. He died in Los Angeles in 1995 at the age of 101. His papers are archived in the Library of Congress.

== Compositions ==
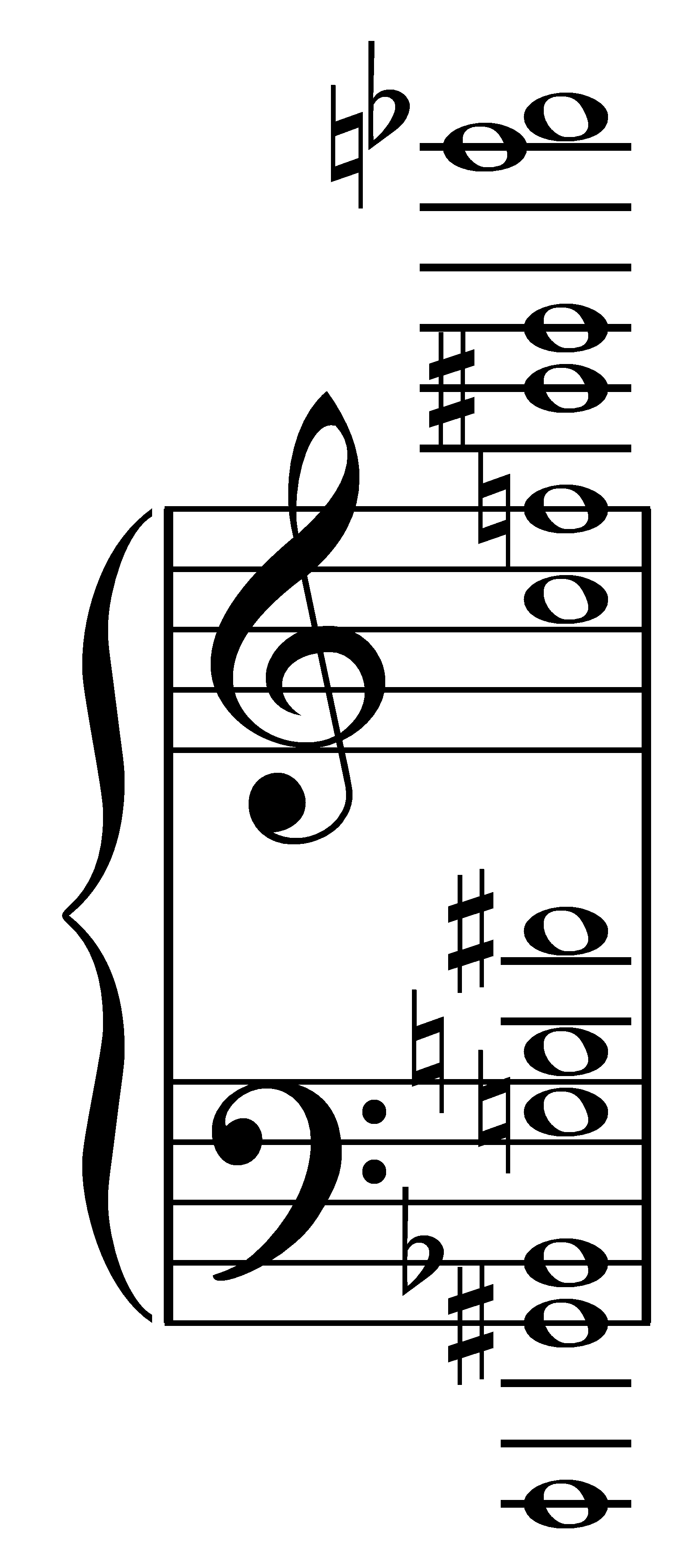
"Grandmother chord", first used by Slonimsky

=== Piano ===
- Minitudes
- Variations on a Kindergarten Tune
- Yellowstone Park Suite
- Russian Nocturne
- Two Etudes
- Silhouettes Iberiennes
- Russian Prelude
- Modinha
- Variations on a Brazilian Tune (My Toy Balloon)
- Studies in Black and White

=== Chamber music ===
- Muss Perpetuo
- Suite (Сюита)
- Piccolo Divertimento
- Quaquaversal Suite

=== Commercial and satire ===
- Five Advertising Songs
- Gravestones at Hancock, New Hampshire (1945)
- A Very Great Musician
- I Owe a Debt to A Monkey (A Humorous Encore Song)

== Writings ==
=== Books ===
- Music Since 1900 (1937) (Note: First published 1937 by Coleman-Ross. Republished in 2001 by Schirmer Reference, New York.)
  - Supplement to Music since 1900 (1986) (Note: Charles Scribner's Sons, New York.)
- Music of Latin America (1945) (Note: First published 1945 by Thomas Y. Crowell. Republished in 1972 by Da Capo Press, New York.)
- Thesaurus of Scales and Melodic Patterns (1947) (Note: Coleman-Ross. Republished in 1975 by Music Sales, New York.)
- The Road to Music New York (1947) (Note: Dodd, Mead. Republished in 1966.)
- A Thing or Two about Music (1948) (Note: New York: Allen, Towne & Heath. Reprinted in 200 as Slonimsky's Book of Musical Anecdotes, Routledge.)
- Lexicon of Musical Invective (1953) (Note: Coleman-Ross. Republished in 2000 by W. W. Norton.)
- Baker's Biographical Dictionary of Musicians (1958). (Note: G. Schirmer. Republished in 2000 by Schirmer Books.)
- The Concise Baker's Biographical Dictionary of Musicians (1987) (Note: New York by Schirmer Books.)
- Perfect Pitch (1988)
- Lectionary of Music (1989) (Note: McGraw-Hill. Republished in 1990 by Anchor Books.)

=== Collected writings ===
- Nicolas Slonimsky: The First Hundred Years (1994) (Note: Ed. Richard Kostelanetz. New York: Schirmer Books.)
- The Great Composers and Their Works (Reissued as The Listener's Companion) (2000) (Note: Ed. Electra Slonimsky Yourke, 2 vols. Schirmer Books, New York.)
- Nicolas Slonimsky: Writings on Music (2004) (Note: Ed. Electra Slonimsky Yourke, 4 vols. Routledge, New York.)
- Dear Dorothy – Letters from Nicolas Slonimsky to Dorothy Adlow (2012) (Note: Ed. Electra Slonimsky Yourke, University of Rochester Press.)
