= Mémoires (Berlioz) =

Berlioz's only autobiography

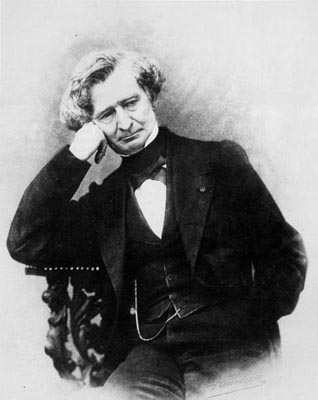
Hector Berlioz photographed by Pierre Petit (1863).

The Mémoires de Hector Berlioz are an autobiography by French composer Hector Berlioz. First serialised in several contemporary journals including Journal des Débats and Le Monde Illustré, their compilation into one book was completed on New Year's Day, 1865 and after much proof-reading, an initial printing of 1200 was carried out in July. After distributing some copies to certain friends, they were put aside until Berlioz died. After Berlioz's death in 1869, they were published in 1870. They provide an extremely colourful, if biased, account of Berlioz's life, and are invaluable to anyone with an interest in the artistic life of the time.

== Editions ==
- Berlioz, Hector, translated by Cairns, David (1865, 1912, 2002). The Memoirs of Hector Berlioz. Hardback. Everyman's Library/Random House. ISBN 0-375-41391-X
