= Tuning Up =

Unfinished composition by Edgard Varèse

- by Edgard Varèse
- Genre: Orchestral
- Commissioned by: Boris Morros
- Scoring: Full orchestra (speculative based on the request from Morros for the New York Philharmonic)

Tuning Up is an unfinished composition for large orchestra by French composer Edgard Varèse. Conceived as a parody on the orchestral sounds before a concert begins, it was sketched in 1947 but was abandoned and never premiered. Chinese-American collaborator Chou Wen-chung reconstructed it many years after Varèse's death, in 1998.

== Background ==
Tuning Up was an indirect request made in 1946 by producer Boris Morros through an old friend of Varèse's, Walter Anderson, who championed his work and had published Varèse's seminal essay "Organized Sound for the Sound Film" in his magazine The Commonweal. Morros was working on a movie at the time, entitled Carnegie Hall, and needed Varèse to compose a short piece parodying the sounds orchestras make at the beginning of a concert, initially though to be played by the New York Philharmonic conducted by Leopold Stokowski. However, whereas Morros wanted the piece to have a certain humorous effect, Varèse attempted to write a serious piece. Even though they didn't get to agree on a sum of money in exchange for the piece, Varèse worked fast and hard, even though the project never took off the ground. A rumor circulated at the time saying that Varèse had been paid a large sum of money and refused to cash the check upon hearing his music altered during rehearsals. In reality, however, Varèse never got to finish more than a few sketches, let alone a score and parts for performance. After finishing two short drafts not amounting to more than a minute and a half each, the project was abandoned.

The piece was only picked up decades later, in 1998 by Chou Wen-Chung, who had worked closely with Varèse and championed his work as a composer, editing and reconstructing many of his works for republication after his death. The completion was made expanding the original material composed by Varèse and using, as the composer did, many quotations to other works of his. This project was commissioned jointly by the Royal Concertgebouw Orchestra, Casa Ricordi, and the Decca Record Company. It was published that same year by Ricordi and republished again in 2001.

== Structure ==
The piece is cast into one movement and takes around 5 to 7 minutes to perform. It is scored for an exceptionally large orchestra, consisting of two piccolos, three flutes, three oboes, an English horn, three clarinets in B♭, a bass clarinet, three bassoons, a contrabassoon, four French horns in F, four trumpets in B♭, two trombones, a bass trombone, a tuba, timpani, two harps, a complete string section and up two six percussionists, playing three tambourines, two differently-pitched ride cymbals, a low-pitched suspended crash cymbal, two differently-pitched cymbals à 2, two very low and differently-pitched tamtams, a very low gong, a very low bass drum, two differently-pitched anvils, two differently-pitched sets of maracas, a glockenspiel, a triangle, three Chinese blocks, two differently-pitched sirens, and sleigh bells.

Tuning Up begins with an A played by the oboe, a usual practice when tuning up since the oboe offers the most stable sound thanks to its construction and the fact that it is much less affected by other factors, like temperature or humidity. Wen-chung specifies that long fragments from each one of the parts are meant to resemble the way instruments are tuned up, without notating anything in particular. This was not Wen-chung's decision and was also present in the original sketches. The final version of the score includes tuning fragments in as much as half of the duration of the piece. A number of quotations are present in the score, among which are Varèse's previous works Amériques, Arcana, Intégrales, and Ionisation. Varèse included these quotations in the sketches. Further quotations, such as Paganini's Caprice No. 9 or the popular tune Yankee Doodle are also present in the score.

In the final, prepared version of the score, the two drafts are played one after the other, even though they are similar to a certain extent. The two drafts start at bars 1 and 41 respectively, with a small bridging section between them in bars 36 to 40. These two sections based on the sketches are concluded with different developments around the note A across the entire orchestral range. Large crescendo and diminuendo markings that do not coincide with the markings for the rest of the orchestra were also found in the sketches, probably meaning that Varèse was initially intending to add any electronic means to the score.

== Recordings ==
Conductor	Orchestra	Date of recording	Place of recording	Label	Format
Riccardo Chailly	Royal Concertgebouw Orchestra	May 1998	Concertgebouw, Amsterdam	Decca	CD
Christopher Lyndon-Gee	Polish National Radio Symphony Orchestra	November 2005	Grzegorz Fitelberg Concert Hall, Katowice	Naxos	CD
