= La Croix du Sud =

La Croix du Sud may refer to:

- Croix du Sud, a Latécoère 300 flying boat
- Croix du Sud, a shipwreck complained about by artist Paul Gauguin
- Croix du Sud, a Tripartite-class minehunter vessel
- Exercise Croix du Sud, a military exercise
- La croix du sud, the French name for the constellation Crux
- La Croix du Sud, a misremembered title for the novel The Invention of Morel
- La croix du sud, a movement in the orchestral composition Offrandes (Varèse)
- La croix du sud, the original French title for Southern Cross (1932 film)

== See also ==
- Southern Cross (disambiguation)
