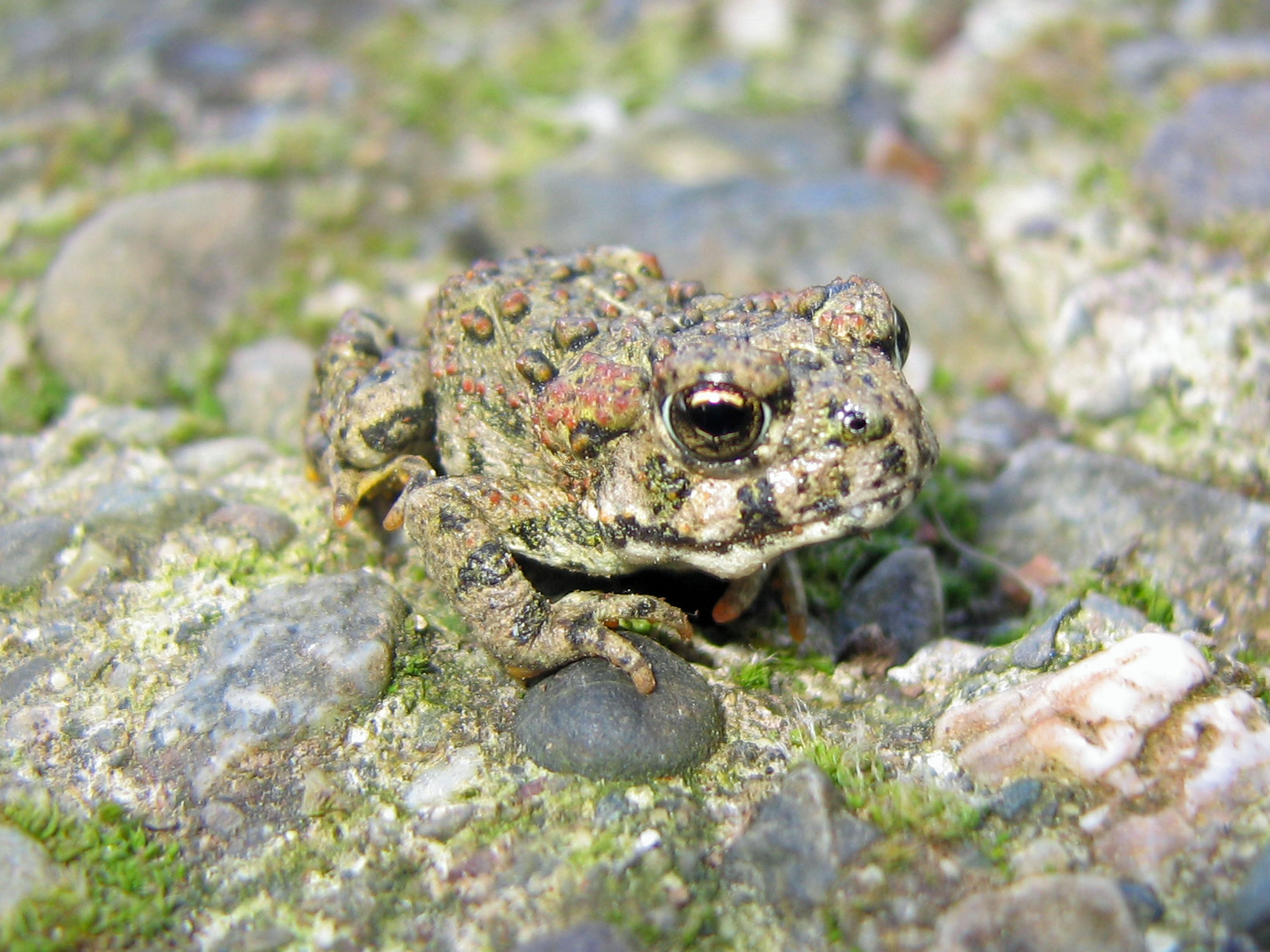

Scientific classification
- Kingdom: Animalia
- Phylum: Chordata
- Class: Amphibia
- Order: Anura
- Family: Bufonidae
- Genus: Anaxyrus
- Species: A. boreas
- Subspecies: A. b. halophilus

Trinomial name
- Anaxyrus boreas halophilus (Baird and Girard, 1853)

= California toad =

Subspecies of amphibian

The California toad (Anaxyrus boreas halophilus) is a subspecies of the western toad, along with the boreal toad. It lives throughout the state of California, with the exception of southeastern desert regions. Like the boreal toad, it feeds on a wide variety of insects and other invertebrates, including grasshoppers, beetles, flies, and mosquitos.

== Etymology ==
The scientific name is Anaxyrus boreas halophilus. Anaxyrus is derived from the Ancient Greek word "anax," meaning "lord," "master," or "king," and in the compound word “Anaxyrus” roughly translates to "king toad" or "lordly toad," alluding to the toad's robust and stately appearance and build. Boreas is from the Greek "boreas," meaning "north wind" or "northern," relating to the species' location. Halophilus comes from the Greek "halos," meaning "sea" or "salt," and "philos," meaning "having affinity for," relating to the toad's abundance in coastal habitats.

== Identification ==
As a tadpole, the California toad is dark brown with a rounded tail and eyes that are inset from the edges of the head. Tadpoles grow to around 5.6 cm (56 mm) in length before undergoing metamorphosis, and the largest western toad larvae are of this subspecies. Juveniles are patterned like adults but have brightly colored orange or yellow pads on the bottom of their feet.

The adult California toad is less blotched (reduced dorsal melanin) than the boreal toad. It has a wider head, larger eyes, smaller feet, and weaker development of the margins along the dorsal stripe. Its dorsal coloration ranges widely, from light gray to green to dull black, though most individuals are brownish gray. Like other western toads, it walks rather than hops. Adults range from two to five inches in size.

== Habitat and distribution ==
The California toad occurs throughout Northern California and south into Baja California. Scattered populations exist in isolated desert areas, such as the Mojave Desert, but the toad generally does not occur in the desert areas from Death Valley southward. The halophilus populations occur in California, western Nevada, and northern Baja California.

Habitats range from woodland, grassland, and forest meadows to backyards and parks in the suburbs. The toad uses desert streams, grasslands, woodlands, and mountain meadows and is found in or near many kinds of water bodies. It breeds in lakes, creeks, ponds, reservoirs, slowly flowing streams, and canals.

== Behaviors ==
At high elevations California toads are diurnal, and at lower elevations they are nocturnal. In winter they burrow into loose soil or inhabit abandoned burrows of small mammals.

== Mating ==
California toads lack pronounced vocal sacs, resulting in much quieter calls. Neither males nor females of this subspecies perform advertisement calls, but they have been noted performing softer, repetitive release calls reminiscent of the high-pitched peeping of a chick.

Males have enlarged, darkened nuptial pads during the breeding season. These appear on the thumb and inner two digits of the hands and improve the male's grip to more easily perform amplexus. Males often become extremely competitive for mates during the breeding season and have also been recorded attempting to mate with other males.

== Reproduction ==
The California toad breeds from January to July, with later spawning at higher elevations. Many populations are aggregation breeders that come to suitable marsh or pond spawning sites in large numbers, where males recognize females through random amplexus. The species is considered an "explosive breeder." Females lay over 16,000 eggs in clutches of 4-inch-long strings, generally in a shallow pond. Eggs are often laid in large communal masses.

== Diet ==
The diet of the California toad changes as it develops. Tadpoles feed on algae and detritus, and they also scavenge carrion such as dead fish and other tadpoles. Juveniles eat mostly ants with the occasional small beetle. The move to larger prey provides more protein and nutrients, which supports their development. Adults eat fewer ants and prey more on small beetles such as ladybugs. Adults eat a wide variety of invertebrates, locating prey by sight, then lunging and catching it with a large, sticky tongue.

== Conservation status ==
The IUCN Red List lists the western toad (Anaxyrus boreas), the species the California toad belongs to, as Least Concern. The species has no CITES listing and no national status. Declines and possible extinctions have been reported for populations in the Sierra Nevada, Colorado, New Mexico, Oregon, Utah, and Wyoming.

In California, the California toad is not on the state's Special Animals List and has no listing under the federal or California Endangered Species Acts. CaliforniaHerps states there are no significant conservation concerns for it in the state.

== Threats and human impacts ==
The causes of amphibian decline listed for this species include deforestation or logging, prolonged drought, habitat fragmentation, disease, weakened immune capacity, and climate change or increased sensitivity to UV-B radiation.

UV-B radiation reduced hatching success in Oregon but not in Colorado, and AmphibiaWeb notes that more study is needed. In Oregon, UV-B combined with the water mold Saprolegnia ferax also reduced hatching success. Acid rain may not be a major cause of decline in Colorado, though this also needs further study.

Translocation projects in the southern Rocky Mountains failed, and the toad there has declined for unknown reasons. A 2021 study found that, unlike three other species, A. boreas did not show shorter lifespans as temperatures rose.

== Predators and predator defenses ==
The California toad defends itself with poisonous secretions from its parotid glands and warts, which deter many predators. Fresh eggs also contain some of the toad's toxin, though it decreases over time. Even so, several animals eat toads anyway.

Reptiles and birds. Garter snakes are among the best-documented predators of metamorphosed western toads, including the valley gartersnake and the two-striped gartersnake. In one San Diego County observation, a two-striped gartersnake took almost 45 minutes to swallow a toad that had puffed up its body. Ravens are also significant predators, taking a high share of breeding toads in the Oregon Cascades and in Colorado; some ravens avoid the toxins by eating only the viscera. A shrike has been photographed killing a California toad and eating its less toxic internal organs. Gray jays, spotted sandpipers, and mallards have been reported as predators in Oregon.

Mammals. Coyotes and raccoons are reported to prey on western toads. Alaska's wildlife agency also lists red foxes, weasels, and mink as possible predators of adults.

Tadpoles and eggs. Tadpoles are vulnerable to birds, fishes, and predaceous insect larvae, and diving beetle larvae are a significant source of predation pressure. Mortality is greatest at the tadpole and juvenile stages. The introduced American bullfrog is also reported to prey on western toads. Eggs are laid in communal masses that are highly susceptible to infection by the water mold Saprolegnia ferax, which, combined with UV-B radiation, has been shown to reduce hatching success in Oregon.

Other hazards. Toads are most conspicuous and vulnerable during the breeding season, when their movement in the water attracts predators. Adults are also slow-moving and are frequently killed by traffic while crossing roads at night during breeding migrations.
