= Un grand sommeil noir =

Un grand sommeir noir
- Song by Edgard Varèse
- English: A Deep Black Sleep
- Year: 1906 or earlier
- Period: 20th century
- Form: Song
- Occasion: Juvenilia work
- Text: Paul Verlaine's Un grand sommeil noir
- Language: French
- Time: 4/4
- Composed: Paris – 1906
- Dedication: Léon Claude Mercerot
- Published: Paris, 1906
- Publisher: Benjamin Roudanez (later Éditions Salabert)
- Duration: 3 minutes
- Movements: 1
- Scoring: Voice (soprano) and piano

Un grand sommeil noir (French: A Deep Black Sleep) is the earliest surviving composition by French composer Edgard Varèse. Written for voice and piano, the piece was finished in 1906 or before, more than a decade earlier than the next surviving composition, Amériques.

== Background ==
This short composition was written while Varèse was still a student in Charles-Marie Widor's composition class at the Conservatoire de Paris. It is a setting of an eponymous poem by Paul Verlaine. It was presumably finished around 1906, although the precise date of completion is hard to ascertain. Dedicated to Léon Claude Mercerot, it was published in 1906 by Benjamin Roudanez and later republished by Éditions Salabert in 1973.

== Structure ==
Un grand sommeil noir is scored for an unspecified voice and piano, although it is usually sung by a soprano. A typical performance has an approximate duration of around three minutes. It is in the key of E-flat minor and has an unchanging time signature of 4/4. Consisting of only 34 bars, it is a rather conventional composition by Varèse, who later became known for being a leading avant-garde figure. The score is marked Modérément lent ("moderately slowly") and, aside from other expression indications, it presents no tempo changes. Just like the original poem which expresses ideas of despair, solitude and the longing for release, the piece is itself somber and melancholic. It is generally a piece with delicate dynamic shading, never using a forte and with very little dynamic variation.

== Arrangement ==
Musicologist Antony Beaumont wrote an arrangement of the piece in 1996. The arrangement, written for soprano and orchestra, was commissioned by Riccardo Chailly and the Royal Concertgebouw Orchestra. It was performed directly for a recording with the commissioners of the piece taken in May 1998 and featured soprano Mireille Delunsch. The recording was later released by Decca Records.

== Recordings ==
Voice	Piano	Date of recording	Place of recording	Label	First release	Format
Mireille Delunsch	François Kerdoncuff	May 1998	Concertgebouw, Amsterdam	Decca	July 1998	CD
Elizabeth Watts	Christopher Lyndon-Gee	November 2005	Grzegorz Fitelberg Concert Hall, Katowice	Naxos	May 2008	CD
