= Isle of Wight Festival 2009 =

- The logo for the 2009 festival
- Genre: rock, pop
- Dates: 12–14 June 2009
- Locations: Seaclose Park, Newport, Isle of Wight, UK
- Website: isleofwightfestival.com

The Isle of Wight Festival 2009 was the eighth revived Isle of Wight Festival to be held at Seaclose Park in Newport on the Isle of Wight. The event took place from 12 to 14 June. Headline acts were confirmed for Friday, Saturday and Sunday nights as The Prodigy, Stereophonics, Simple Minds and Neil Young respectively.

On 8 June 2009 it was reported that tickets for the festival had sold out, however in an attempt to combat ticket touts, a limited number were held on the door.

== New features ==
In February 2009 The Charlatans were announced as headline acts for The Big Top Arena, which has continued from 2008. However lead singer Tim Burgess was given the extra role of curating Sunday's activity by choosing his favourite bands to perform there.

== Highlights ==
- A return aerial display by the Red Arrows on Saturday afternoon.
- Paolo Nutini doing a surprise performance on the acoustic stage.
- Neil Young closing his headline set by tearing apart his electric guitar in tribute to Jimi Hendrix.
- Neil Young performing a cover of the Beatles 'A Day in the Life'.
- Cheeky banter featuring throughout Goldie Lookin' Chain's set.

== Line Up ==
=== Main stage ===
Friday

- The Prodigy
- Basement Jaxx
- Pendulum
- The Ting Tings
- Iglu & Hartly
- Sneaky Sound System

Saturday

- Stereophonics
- Razorlight
- Maxïmo Park
- White Lies
- Paolo Nutini
- The View
- Sharon Corr
- The Rifles
- The Zombies
- The Yeah You's
- Majortones

Sunday

- Neil Young
- Pixies
- Simple Minds
- The Pigeon Detectives
- The Script
- Goldie Lookin Chain
- Judy Collins
- Arno Carstens
- Papa Do Plenty

=== The Big Top ===
Thursday (Campers only)

- The Human League
- King Meets Queen
- The Complete Stone Roses
- DJ sets by Rusty Egan

Friday

- Bananarama
- Ladyhawke
- Alesha Dixon
- The Noisettes
- Beverley Knight
- Eddi Reader
- Pixie Lott
- DJ sets by Rusty Egan

Saturday

- Australian Pink Floyd
- Ultravox
- Calvin Harris
- McFly
- Will Young
- Mercury Rev
- The Rakes
- The Maccabees
- Jessie Evans
- The Operators
- The Arcadian Kicks
- Deborah Hodgson
- DJ sets by Rusty Egan

Sunday

- The Charlatans
- Killing Joke
- The Horrors
- Black Lips
- The Rumble Strips
- The Pains of Being Pure at Heart
- Hatcham Social
- S.C.U.M
- Poppy & the Jezebels
- We Could Be Giants
- Dance for Burgess
- Dj sets by Tim Burgess and Rhys Webb with The She Set

== Rumours ==
In October 2008 it was rumoured that Oasis would be headlining the festival on the Saturday night, according to the Virtual Festivals website. It claimed that the band would be starting their European tour with the Isle of Wight Festival. This was denied on 11 February by the festival's organiser.

U2 have also been rumoured to headline on Sunday.

Other festival rumours have included:

- Kings of Leon
- Elbow
- Paul Weller
- Girls Aloud
- Duffy
- Seasick Steve
- Keane

BBC comedy stars Gavin & Stacey could be on the bill and it was reported in the News of the World that Horne and Corden would perform as a band at the festival.

== Awards ==
So far, the Isle of Wight Festival has been shortlisted for the "Best Live Event" category of the 2009 NME Awards.
