= Labuan (disambiguation) =

Labuan, Labuhan, or Pelabuhan may refer to:

== Malaysia ==
- Labuan, a federal territory of Malaysia
  - The Crown Colony of Labuan, when Labuan was ruled by the British
- Labuan (federal constituency), represented in the Dewan Rakyat (1986-today)
- Labuan (state constituency), formerly represented in the Sabah State Legislative Assembly (1967–1986)

== Indonesia ==
- Labuan, Pandeglang, is a town (and kecamatan) of 56,313 people (as at mid 2021) in Pandeglang Regency of Banten Province
- Labuan Bajo is sometimes shown on maps simply as Labuan

== Other ==
- HMAS Labuan, more than one Australian warship
- HMS Labuan (K584), a British frigate in service with the Royal Navy from 1944 to 1946
- The Pearl of Labuan, a character in Emilio Salgari's Sandokan books
