= Nocturnal (disambiguation) =

Nocturnality describes sleeping during the daytime and being active at night.

Nocturnal(s) may also refer to:

== Music ==
=== Classical compositions ===
- Nocturnal (Varèse), a 1961 work for voice and orchestra by Edgard Varèse
- Nocturnal after John Dowland, a 1963 work for solo guitar by Benjamin Britten

=== Performers ===
- Knoc-turn'al (born 1975), American rapper
- Nokturnl, an Australian rap metal band

=== Albums ===
- Nocturnal (Amaral album) or the title song, 2015
- Nocturnal (Aziatix album), 2011
- Nocturnal (The Black Dahlia Murder album) or the title song, 2007
- Nocturnal (Heltah Skeltah album), 1996
- Nocturnal (Yuna album), 2013
- Nocturnal (OsamaSon album), 2026
- Nocturnal (Roy Woods EP), 2016
- Nocturnal, EP by Prozak, 2012
- Nocturnal, by Florian-Ayala Fauna, 2012

=== Songs ===
- "Nocturnal" (song), by Disclosure, 2016
- "Nocturnal", by Flo from Access All Areas, 2024
- "Nocturnal", by House of Large Sizes from My Ass-Kicking Life, 1994

== Other uses ==
- Nocturnal (instrument), a device for determining time from the position of stars
- Nocturnal (novel), a 2007 podcast and 2012 novel by Scott Sigler
- Nocturnal (2025 film), a South Korean film
- Nocturnal (2019 film), a film by Nathalie Biancheri
- Nocturnals, a comics series by Dan Brereton
  - Nocturnals: A Midnight Companion, a 2004 role-playing game supplement based on the comics
- Nocturnal sect, a category in astrology of sect

== See also ==
- Night Owl
- Grace Potter and the Nocturnals, an American rock band active from 2002 to 2015
