= Madrigales ideográficos =

Two poems by José Juan Tablada

Madrigales ideográficos are two poems by the poet, journalist, and Mexican diplomat, José Juan Tablada, published in 1920 in Caracas, Venezuela, in his slim volume of poetry Li Po and other poems. This book of poems was edited by Eduardo Nuñez Coll, and printed by the Bolívar Press on January 6, 1920. A game to arrange lines of traditional poetry to form pictures with them, Li Po and other poems is a book of these drawings crafted entirely out of poetic verse. The drawings produced by this action create a poetic space that Mexican poet Octavio Paz christened "topoemas". The poems "El Puñal"(The Dagger) and "El Talón Rouge"(The Rouge Heel) are prepared in the image of a dagger and in the image of a heeled shoe. Each image represents the subject of its respective poem.

Although presented as a drawing, the poems are read as if they were written in traditional stanzas. Both poems are organized into four verses that contain 7 to 11 syllables, and use the AB-AB rhyme scheme.

== El Puñal ==
The first poem, "El Puñal"(The Dagger), concerns itself with the "first look of passion" that is driven "like a dagger into the heart" of the speaker of the poem. The poem takes the form of a dagger to emphasize the idea of the game behind the volume of poems.

== El Talón Rouge ==
The subject of "El Talón Rouge"(The Rouge Heel) is a heeled shoe that reminds the poem's speaker of the love that causes him suffering. The inclusion of the word "Rouge" in the title and the mention of the color crimson in the poem imagines the blood coming from the speaker's heart, and alludes to two classic models of passionate love: the Moulin Rouge in Paris, and the other model from the French opera by Bizet, Carmen.
