= Ecuatorial (Varèse) =

- Secular cantata by Edgard Varèse
- Text: Popol Vuh
- Composed: 1934 (rev. 1961)
- Dedication: Louise Varèse
- Published: 1961, New York
- Publisher: Colfranc Music Publishing
- Duration: 11 minutes
- Scoring: Bass (or male chorus) and ensemble

Premiere
- Date: April 15, 1934
- Location: Town Hall, New York City
- Conductor: Nicolas Slonimsky
- Performers: Chase Baromeo (bass)

Ecuatorial is a secular cantata for bass or male chorus and large ensemble by the French–American composer Edgard Varèse. Finished in 1934, it was revised in 1961.

== Background ==
Ecuatorial was born out of Varèse's fascination with electronic instruments. After the French premiere of Amériques in 1929, where the composer replaced the siren with an ondes Martenot, he decided to move electronic instruments to the foreground. Written between 1932 and 1934, Ecuatorial was Varèse's first composition to feature both acoustic and electronic instruments. The title comes from the area of land where pre-Columbian art flourished. It was dedicated to Louise Varèse, his wife, and premiered on April 15, 1934, at New York's Town Hall. The premiere was given by bass Chase Baromeo and conductor Nicolas Slonimsky. The concert was sponsored by the Pan American Association of Composers, an association founded by Varèse himself that was largely funded by Charles Ives and premiered many works by Varèse. In 1961, Edgard Varèse revised the composition, making several modifications to the scoring to facilitate its publication. The revised version was published by Colfranc Music Publishing in 1961 and later by Casa Ricordi.

== Structure ==
This cantata has a total playing time of eleven minutes. It is scored for a solo bass (or male chorus in the revised version) and an atypical large ensemble: four trumpets, four trombones, piano, organ, two "cello theremins" designed by Leon Theremin (changed to two ondes Martenot in the revised version), and six percussionists playing timpani, two snare drums, two tenor drums, three bass drums, two tam-tams, a gong, cymbals, a suspended cymbal, temple blocks, and a tambourine.

The composition initially featured two "cello theremins" designed by Leon Theremin, which had a fingerboard and an extremely high-pitched range (reaching as high as E7). Varèse was specially interested in these theremins as they would allow for glissandi and long sustained notes. For the 1961 revised version, these would be replaced with the ondes Martenot, which had become much more popular in France in the 1940s and was generally easier for play for keyboard players. The other change made for Ecuatorial's first publication in 1961 was the optional change of the bass for a male chorus. Varèse stated in that regard that the chorus should be made up of "bass voices, above all, no church singers. At all costs avoid the constipated and Calvinists."

The text used for the bass or male chorus is a Spanish translation by Francisco Ximénez of the Kʼicheʼ Mayan mythological text Popol Vuh. The translation was included in Miguel Ángel Asturias's Leyendas de Guatemala; when this work was translated into French in 1932, Varèse got a copy, which is where the quotations were extracted from. The composer chose to include the text in its original Spanish, as he had a good command of the language and preferred it over the French translation. According to Varèse, the text is part of the invocation of a tribe lost in the mountains, having left the City of Abundance. For this reason, Varèse specifies that a typical performance "should be dramatic and incantatory, guided by the imploring fervor of the text, and should follow the dynamic indications of the score." Varèse also emphasizes the importance of "primitive rude[ness]" when performing Ecuatorial. Varèse explores the contradiction, or rather juxtaposition of opposites, that involves using most primitive instruments, like percussion, together with most advanced instruments, such as the ondes Martenot. In Varèse's words, "I want to encompass all that is human... from the primitive to the farthest reaches of science".

== Reception ==
Ecuatorial received mixed to positive reviews from contemporary critics, who were surprised by Varèse's style and generally noted the novel use of the theremin in concert performances. The New York Times described the premiere in the following terms: "Mr. Varèse has written music that has power and atmosphere. ... It is sometimes unclear; a welter of sound obscures any central meaning in such pages. The theremins gave the work an unearthly quality at times; in some passages they were mere caterwauling." The New York Herald Tribune also described the "piercingly shrieking theremin instruments" and stated that "the plan and purpose of the outlines of the music and Mr. Varèse's scoring ... was not always clear, but there were many pungent, massively expressive measures." The piece went unpublished until 1961 and would not be performed again in the next twenty-five years.

== Recordings ==
The following is a partial list of recordings of Ecuatorial:

Recordings of Edgard Varèse's Ecuatorial
Bass (or male chorus)	Ensemble	Conductor	Date of recording	Place of recording	Record label	First release	Format
Kevin Deas	Asko|Schönberg	Riccardo Chailly	May 1997	Concertgebouw, Amsterdam	Decca	1998	CD
Camerata Silesia	Polish National Radio Symphony Orchestra	Christopher Lyndon-Gee	November 2005	Grzegorz Fitelberg Hall, Katowice	Naxos	2008	CD
