= Hyperprism (Varèse) =

Musical composition

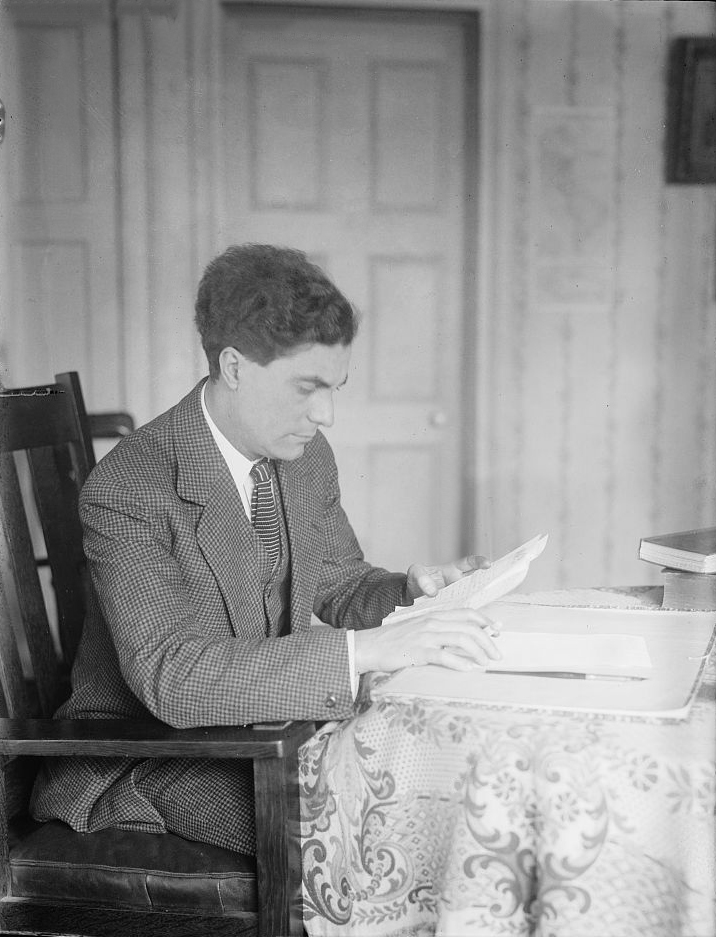
Edgard Varèse, 1915

Hyperprism is a work for wind, brass, and percussion instruments by Edgard Varèse, composed in 1922 and revised in 1923.

== Background ==
The work was first performed at an International Composers' Guild concert during their second series at the Klaw Theatre on March 4, 1923. The audience laughed throughout the performance and hissed during the ovation. Someone, perhaps Carlos Salzedo, got on the stage and urged the audience to take the work seriously. It was repeated to no better effect on the crowd. There was one report of a fistfight between two men who were exiting the hall.

It remained for Edgard Varese (to whom all honor) to shatter the calm of a Sabbath night, to cause peaceful lovers of music to scream out their agony, to arouse angry emotions and tempt men to retire to the back of the theater and perform tympani concertos on each other's faces.

— William James Henderson

== Instrumentation ==
The piece is scored for the following instrumentation.

Woodwinds
1 flute (doubling piccolo)
1 clarinet in E♭
Brass
3 horns
2 trumpets in C
1 tenor trombone
1 bass trombones

Percussion
snare drum
Indian drum
bass drum
tambourine
Chinese cymbal
2 cymbals
tam-tam
triangle

Percussion (cont'd)
anvil
slapstick
2 Chinese blocks (high and low)
lion's roar
rattle
big rattle
sleigh bells
siren
