= José Juan Tablada =

Mexican poet, art critic, and diplomat (1871-1945)

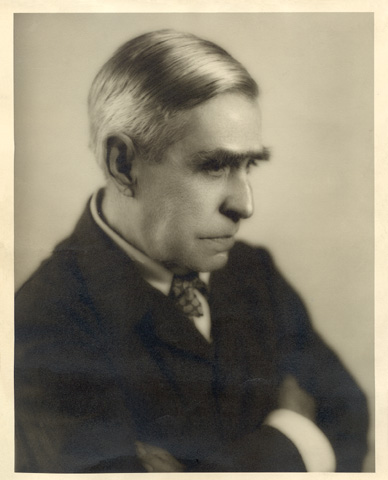
- Born: April 3, 1871 Mexico City
- Died: August 2, 1945 (aged 74)
- Occupation: writer; art critic; diplomat
- Genre: poetry
- Notable works: Un dia

José Juan de Aguilar Acuña Tablada (April 3, 1871 – August 2, 1945) was a Mexican poet, art critic and, for a brief period, diplomat. A pioneer of oriental studies, and champion of Mexican art, he spent a good portion of his life living abroad. As a poet, his work spans from the fin-de-siècle style to avant-garde experimentalism. He was an influential early writer of Spanish-language haiku.

== Career ==
Tablada was born in Mexico City and studied at Chapultepec Castle. He at first worked for the national railways. In 1890, aged 19, he began contributing to magazines and newspapers as a journalist, essayist and poet. In 1894 his rhythmic and intricate poem "Onix" brought him renown. Florilegio, his first collection of poetry, was published in 1899 and established him as one of Mexico's pioneer 'modernists', although at that period such writing approximated the style of the French decadent movement.

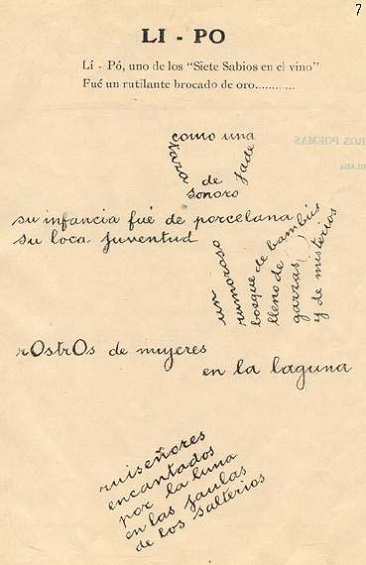
An example calligram from Li-Po y otros Poemas (1920)

From early on, he became interested in Japanese aesthetics and travelled to Japan for some months in 1900. This left its influence on his work and culminated in a book on the artist Hiroshige (1914) and a general work, En el país del sol (In the land of the sun, 1919). The latter was made up of a selection of his articles on Japanese subjects over the years, in particular those arising from his 1900 visit. In addition he had brought back a large collection of ukiyo-e prints that are now in the National Library of Mexico.

During the turmoil of the Mexican Revolution, Tablada spent time in Paris and then in New York City until he was appointed a cultural secretary in the Foreign Service in 1918, serving in Bogotá, Caracas, and Quito. Unable to adapt to the altitude of the last, he resigned and thereafter spent much of his time in New York until 1935. There he ran a bookshop and founded the magazine Mexican Art and Life. At this time he was championing Mexican art, being among the first to draw attention to the art of the Pre-Columbian period, but also supporting the modernist painters José Clemente Orozco and Diego Rivera.

After his return to Mexico, he published a partial autobiography, La feria de la vida (Life's Fair, 1937), and was elected a member of the Mexican Literary Academy in 1941. He was appointed Vice-Consul for New York City in 1945 but died soon after his arrival. On November 5, 1946 his remains we interred at the Rotunda of Illustrious Persons.

== Poetry ==
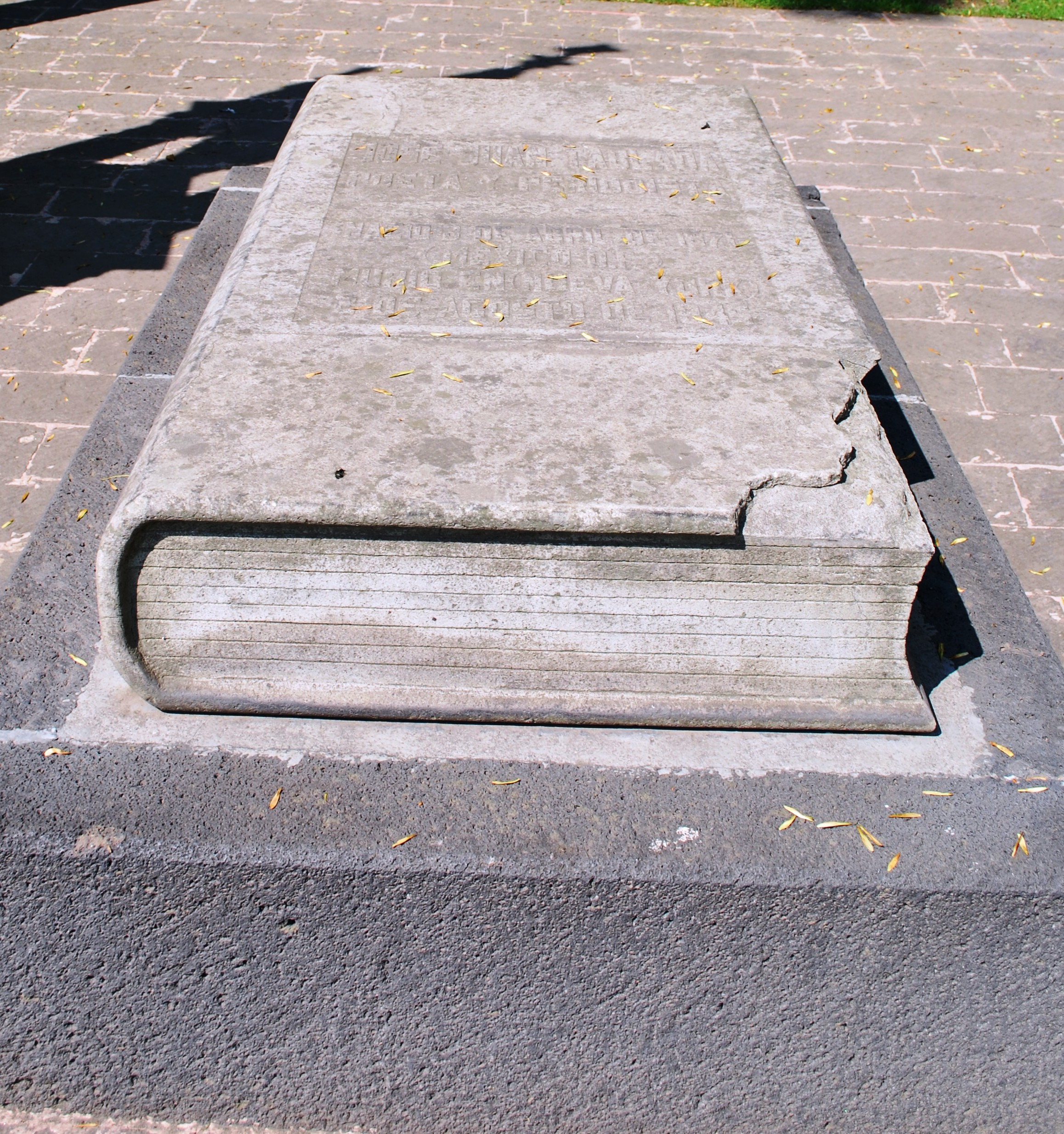
Tablada's tomb in Panteón de Dolores cemetery, Mexico City

Tablada is recognized as among the originators of modern Mexican poetry and is credited with the introduction of haiku to his country. His collection Un dia (1919) contains 38 'synthetic poems' and has been described as "the first book of original haiku written by a poet outside Japan". It was followed by a collection of calligrams, Li-Po y otros poemas (1920), and in 1922 by El jarro de flores, containing a further 68 haiku. His haiku are distinguished by their aesthetic quality, as for example in

Slight willow,

almost gold, almost amber,

almost light….

and by their humour:

Moonlit roofs beyond the window,
Chinese shadows inky black
and the Chinese music of cats.

In 1921 his friend the composer Edgard Varèse incorporated an earlier piece by Tablada, La Cruz del Sur, in his Offrandes (1921), and two years later dedicated his Hyperprism to the poet. After Tablada's death, Luis Sandi set ten of his haiku for voice and piano (Diez hai-kais para canto y piano, 1947).

== Bibliography ==
=== Poetry ===
- El florilegio, 1899
- La epopeya nacional, Porfirio Díaz, 1909
- Hiroshigué: el pinto de la nieve, de la lluvia, de la noche y de la luna, 1914
- Al sol y bajo la luna, 1918
- Un día... Poemas Sintéticos, 1919
- Li-Po y otros poemas, 1920
- Madrigales ideográficos, 1920
- Retablo de memoria de Ramón López Velarde, 1921
- El jarro de flores, 1922
- Intersecciones, 1924
- La feria: poemas mexicanos, 1928
- Del humorismo a la carcajada, 1944

=== Essays ===
- "La defensa social: historia de la campaña de la División del Norte", 1913.
- "Historia del arte en México", 1927
- "Hongos mexicanos comestibles: micología económica", 1983
