= Nocturnal (Varèse) =

Nocturnal (1961) for soprano, male choir, and orchestra, is a composition by Edgard Varèse with text consisting of syllables by Varèse and words and phrases adapted from House of Incest by Anaïs Nin. Left incomplete by the composer, it was revised and completed posthumously by his protégé Chou Wen-chung in 1968. The piece was commissioned by and dedicated to the Koussevitzky Foundation, and was in published 1972. It includes music for flexatone and two ondes Martenots. The use of Dada-like "meta-language" in Ecuatorial and in Nocturnal was suggested by Antonin Artaud. The premiere of the unfinished work was conducted by Robert Craft at The Town Hall in New York on May 1, 1961.
