= Calligram =

Written work arranged in a way that creates a visual image

Calligram in French by Guillaume Apollinaire describing and visually representing his lover. Parts of the face's image (such as the hat, eye, nose, mouth, neck) each use words associated specifically with that part.

A calligram is a set of words arranged in such a way that it forms a thematically related image. It can be a poem, a phrase, a portion of scripture, or a single word; the visual arrangement can rely on certain use of the typeface, calligraphy or handwriting, for instance along non-parallel and curved text lines, or in shaped paragraphs. The image created by the words illustrates the text by expressing visually what it says, or something closely associated; it can also, on purpose, show something contradictory to the text or otherwise be misleading, or can contribute additional thoughts and meanings to the text.

== Writers ==
Guillaume Apollinaire was a famous calligram writer and author of a book of poems called Calligrammes.

José Juan Tablada wrote a book of Spanish-language calligrams entitled Li-Po y otros poemas.

== Gallery ==
Calligram of a tiger in Arabic script

Calligram of a snake in Georgian script

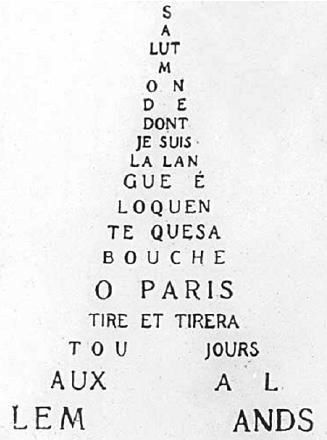
Calligram about the Eiffel Tower by Guillaume Apollinaire

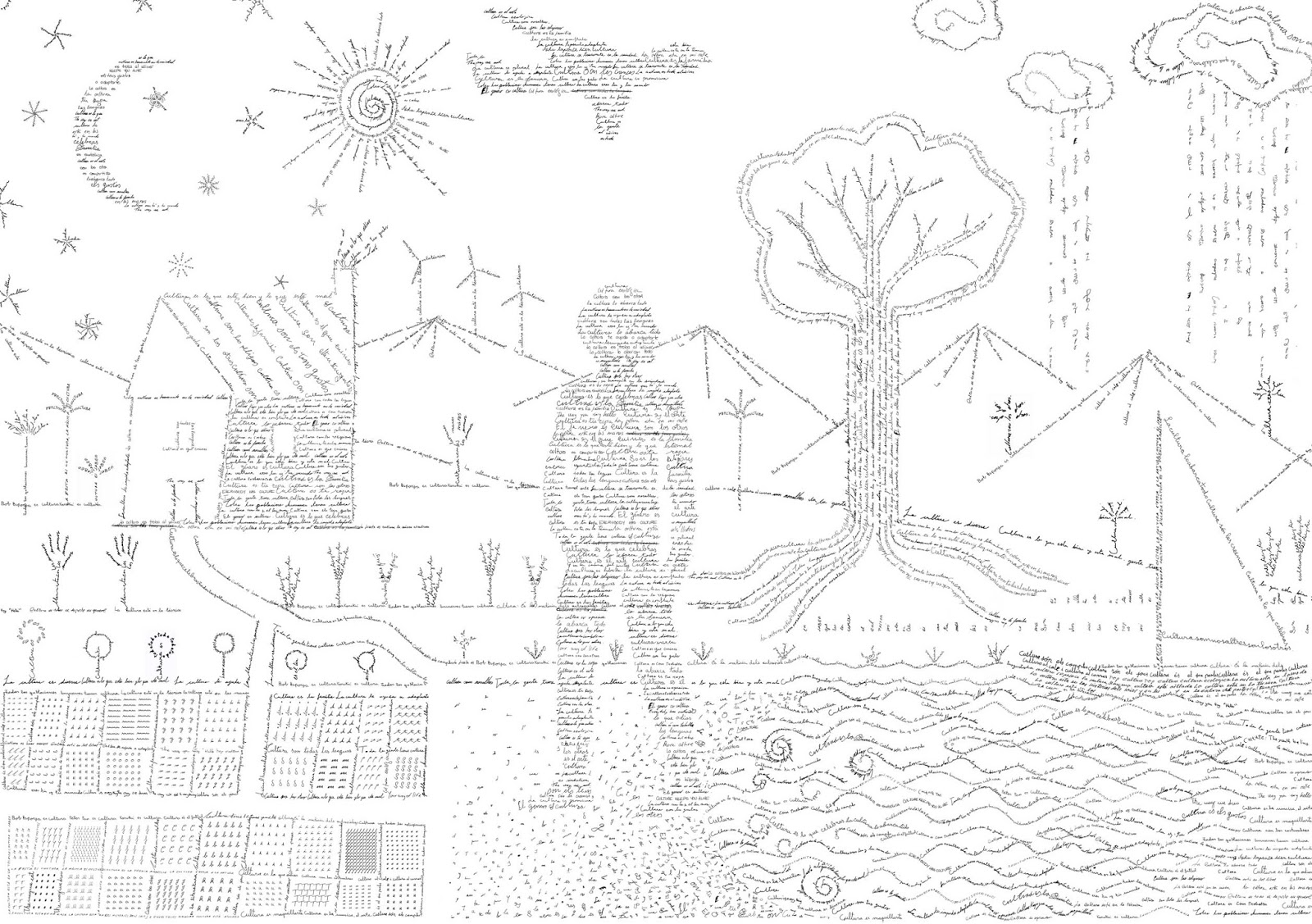
Large calligram at the Valencian Museum of Ethnology

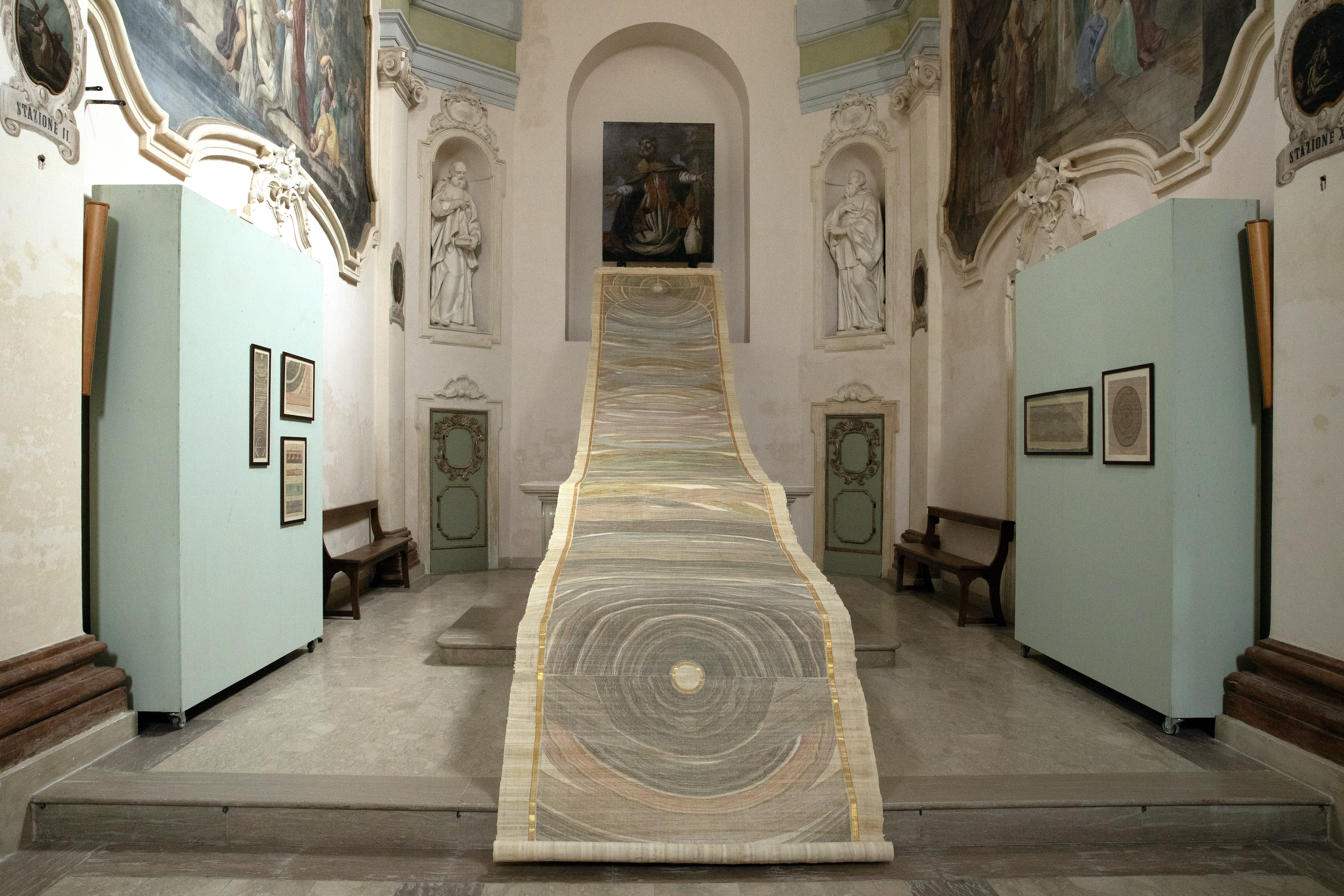
"Biblical Cosmography", large calligram of the Bible in Latin by Gianluca Bosi

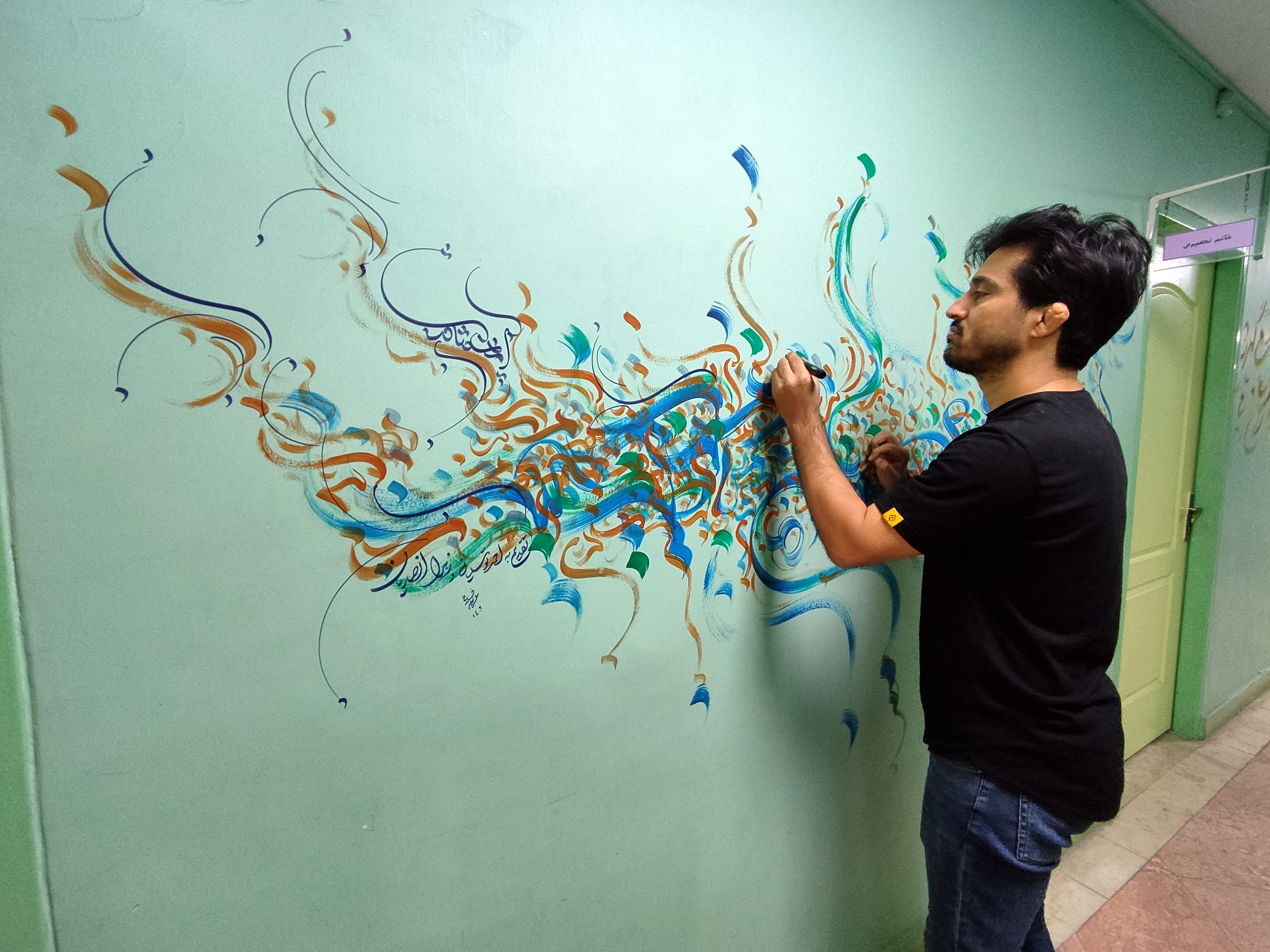
A calligrapher at work on a school wall

== See also ==
- Ambigram
- Concrete poetry
- Islamic calligraphy
- Micrography
- Visual poetry
