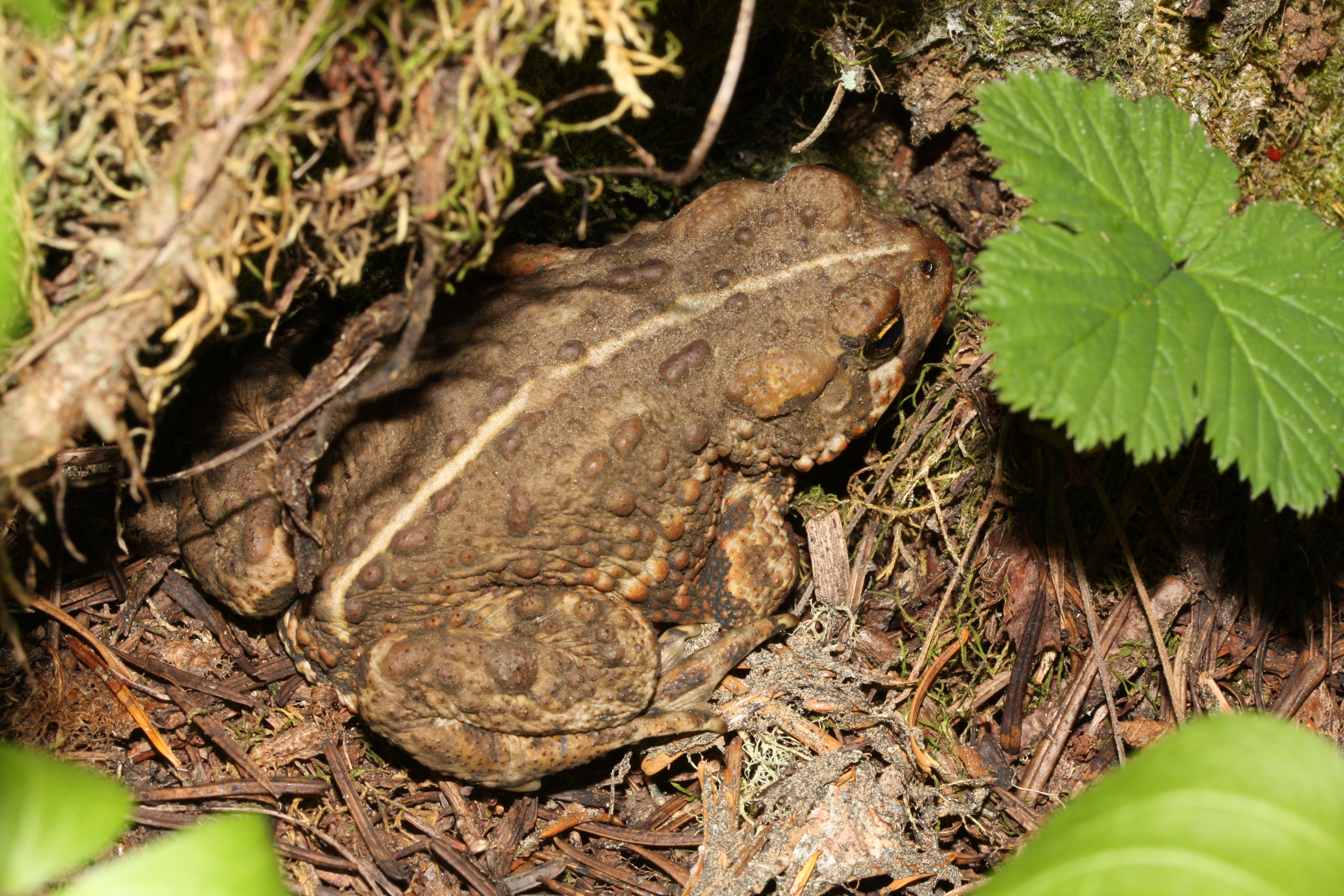
- Anaxyrus boreas boreas

Conservation status
- Least Concern (IUCN 3.1)

- Apparently Secure (NatureServe)

Scientific classification
- Kingdom: Animalia
- Phylum: Chordata
- Class: Amphibia
- Order: Anura
- Family: Bufonidae
- Genus: Anaxyrus
- Species: A. boreas

Binomial name
- Anaxyrus boreas (Baird and Girard, 1852)
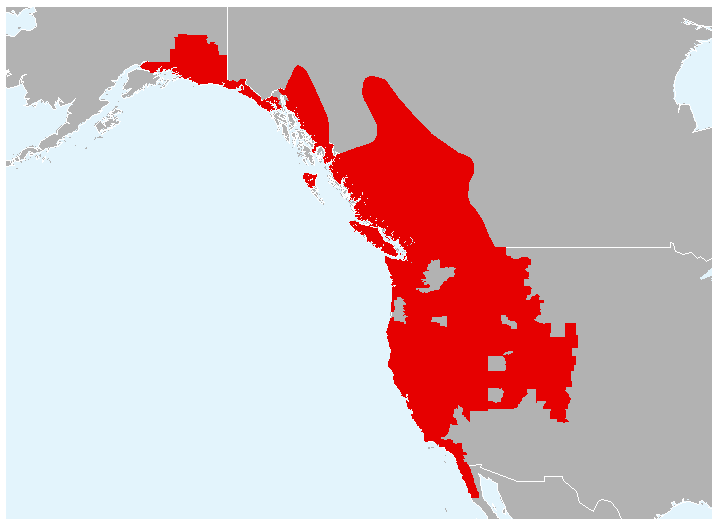

Synonyms
- Bufo boreas Baird & Girard, 1852; Bufo politus Cope, 1862

= Western toad =

Species of amphibian

The western toad (Anaxyrus boreas) is a large toad species, between 5.6 and 13 cm (2.2 and 5.1 in) long, native to western North America. A. boreas is frequently encountered during the wet season on roads, or near water at other times. It can jump a considerable distance for a toad. Breeding occurs between March and July in mountainous areas, and as early as January in lower-elevation regions. The female lays up to 17,000 eggs stuck together in strings that adhere to vegetation and other objects along water edges.

== Description ==
It has a white or cream dorsal stripe, and is dusky gray or greenish dorsally with skin glands concentrated within the dark blotches. Its parotoid glands are oval, widely separated, and larger than the upper eyelids. It has a mottled venter and horizontal pupils but lacks cranial crests. Compared to females, males have smoother skin, reduced dorsal blotching, and nuptial pads (thickened skin) on their forefeet during breeding season. In juveniles of this species, the dorsal stripe is weak or absent. Large young have prominent dorsal and ventral spotting and yellow feet.

== Subspecies ==
There are two known subspecies of the western toad and the ranges of subspecies are as follows:

Image	Scientific name	Common name	Description	Distribution
	Anaxyrus boreas boreas	Boreal toad	Cranial crest is not present. Underbelly is covered by a considerable number of dark blotches.	Western British Columbia and southern Alaska south from Washington, Oregon, Idaho, western Montana and western Wyoming to northern California, Nevada, western Colorado, and western Utah.
	Anaxyrus boreas halophilus	California toad	Wider head, larger eyes, smaller feet, and a weaker development of the margins along the dorsal stripe.	Extreme western Nevada through the Central Valley of California and coastal California south to Baja California.

== Distribution ==
The range of the western toad extends from western British Columbia and southern Alaska south through Washington, Oregon, and Idaho to northern Baja California, Mexico; east to Montana, western and central Wyoming, Nevada, the mountains and higher plateaus of Utah, and western Colorado. Sightings of the boreal toad in Yukon Territory, the Northwest Territories, and northwestern and north-central British Columbia have been reported. Southern records of boreal toads in New Mexico have been published, but the species is considered extirpated from the state, with a reintroduction in progress.

== Habitat ==
The boreal toad is found in the Rocky Mountains in aspen (Populus spp.) groves and riparian forests. In Colorado, the largest populations are typically found in areas characterized by willows (Salix spp.), bog birch (Betula glandulosa), and shrubby cinquefoil (Potentilla fruticosa). In the Pacific Northwest, the western toad occurs in mountain meadows and less commonly in Douglas fir forests (Pseudotsuga menziesii).

In California, optimal habitat for the western toad includes wet or dry mountain meadows or riparian deciduous forest with available open water for breeding. Suitable habitat includes blue oak (Quercus douglasii) savanna, gray pine-oak forest (Pinus sabiniana-Quercus spp.), mixed conifer forest, and alpine meadows. Marginal habitats include annual grasslands, chaparral, ponderosa pine forests, California black oak woodlands, Jeffrey pine forests, and red fir forests.

In the Sierra Nevada, the western toad occurs in mid-elevation pine forests (including Jeffrey pine (Pinus jeffreyi) at higher elevations and ponderosa pine (Pinus ponderosa) at lower elevations), California black oak woodlands (Quercus kelloggii), giant sequoia groves (Sequoiadendron giganteum), montane fir forest (which includes white fir (Abies concolor), red fir (Abies magnifica), and western white pine (Pinus monticola)), and redwood forest (Sequoia sempervirens). It is also found in riparian areas within sagebrush-pinyon communities (Artemisia spp.-Pinus spp.), oak-pine woodland and savanna (including coast live oak (Quercus agrifolia), interior live oak (Quercus wislizenii), and canyon live oak (Quercus chrysolepis)), and California coastal forest and scrub.

Western toads have been collected from sedge meadows near a pond occurring in a creosotebush (Larrea tridentata) community, and from aspen (Populus spp.)-willow groves within big sagebrush (Artemisia tridentata) grassland.

== Life cycle ==
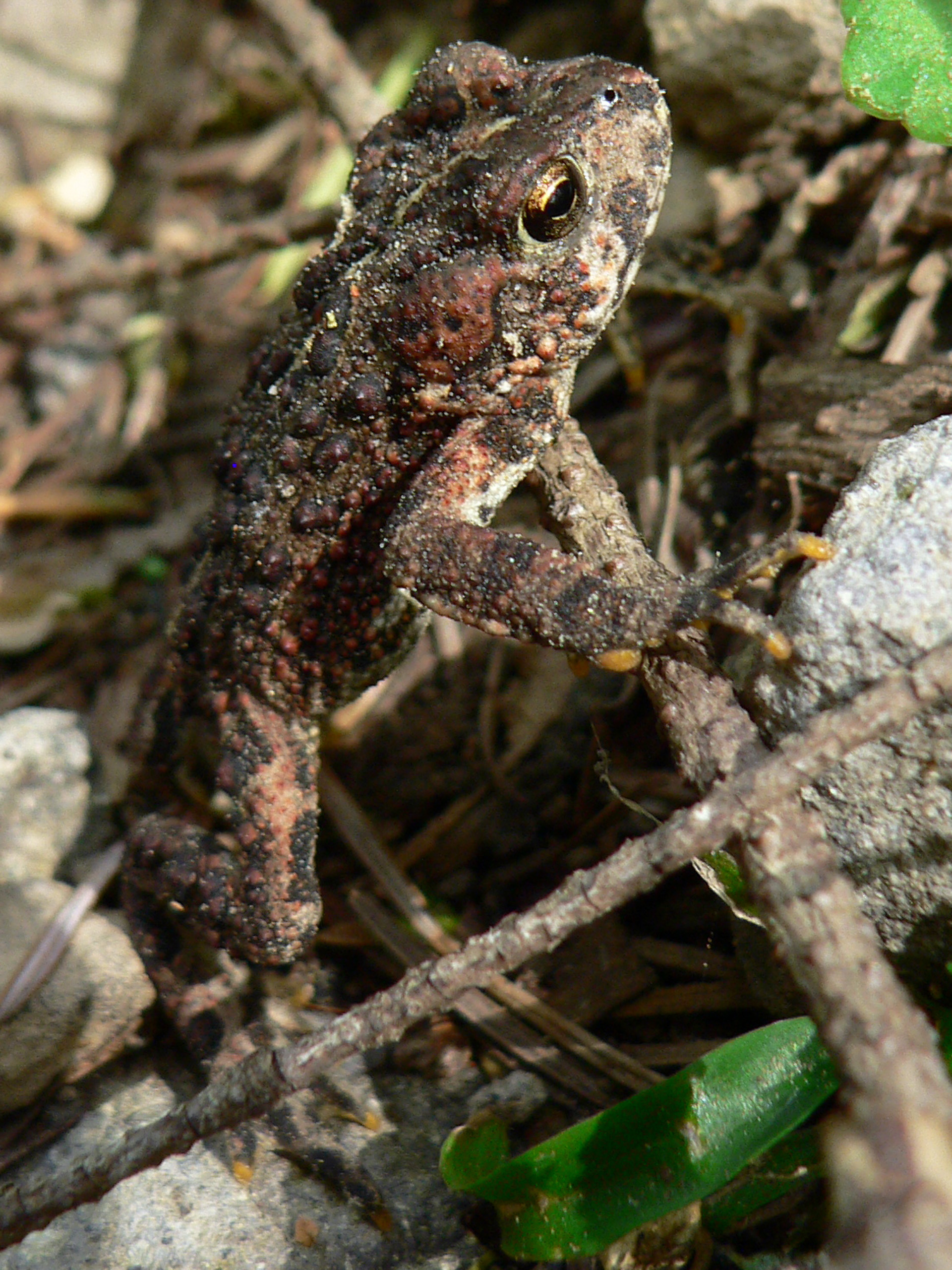
Oval parotoid glands, located behind the eyes, are distinguishing features of this species.

Western toads are active from January to October, depending on latitude and elevation, and hibernate over the winter. Boreal toads in one Colorado population used natural chambers near a small stream bed for hibernation. The high water table, constantly flowing stream, and deep winter snow served to maintain the air temperature within the hibernaculum at a point slightly above freezing. Emergence from hibernation followed a few days of warm temperatures that freed the entrance and increased temperatures within the chamber to about 39.2 °F (4.0 °C).

At low elevations western toads are active at night; at high elevations and in the northern parts of their range they are diurnal. Body temperature of western toads is closely correlated with the substrate temperature. Basking and conduction from the substrate are primary means of increasing body temperature and cooling is achieved by evaporative cooling and conduction of heat to a cooler medium. Diurnal and nocturnal activity are often related to seasonal changes in temperature; most western toads are diurnal during the spring and fall but are nocturnal during the warmer summer months.

In central Oregon, the minimum breeding age for male western toads is three years, and probably four or five years for females. California toads are reported as sexually mature at two years of age. Male western toads breed every year; females breed at less regular intervals, depending on individual condition and previous years' breeding effort. Sex ratios differ according to habitat type; males are more numerous in wet areas and females are more numerous in dry habitats.

Eggs are laid in open water from February to July, with peak activity occurring in April. Timing of egg-laying activity varies with elevation and weather conditions. In Colorado, initiation of breeding was correlated with the onset of warming weather and initiation of snowpack melting. Eggs are usually laid in late May or early June. In western Montana, a few males were present on the shores (of two gravel pits) by May 11, 1967, and by May 14, each pond contained at least 30 males. Males were spaced at least 1 foot (0.30 m) apart, all facing the shore Eggs are laid in gelatinous strings of 13 to 52 eggs per inch (2.5 cm), in masses of up to 16,500 per clutch. Egg development rate is partially dependent on temperature; hatching times vary.

Metamorphosis is usually completed within three months of egg laying. The time required for metamorphosis is given as 30 to 45 days for the boreal toad and 28 to 45 days for the California toad.

Female western toads at least 10 to 11 years of age have been reported. In Colorado, boreal toads probably attain a maximum age of at least 9 years.

== Preferred habitat ==
Western toads are widespread throughout the mountainous areas of northwestern North America, ranging from sea level to elevations near or above regional treeline, or 10,000 feet (305–3,050 m) in elevation. They are significantly less common at the higher elevations. Elevational range in Colorado is from about 7,000 to 11,860 feet (2,130 to 3,610 m). In the mountains of Colorado, the largest western toad populations usually occur from about 9,500 to 11,000 feet (2,900 to 3,400 m) elevation. Western toads occupy desert streams and springs, grasslands, and mountain meadows; they are less common in heavily wooded regions. They are usually found in or near ponds, lakes (including saline lakes), reservoirs, rivers, and streams within the above-mentioned habitats. Under laboratory conditions western toads were able to survive in 40% seawater, but died within a week when exposed to 50% seawater.

In Colorado, individual western toads typically maintain distinct ranges which vary greatly in size according to the condition of the habitat. Breeding males may exhibit territoriality, especially in areas where breeding sites are scarce.

Populations of western toads have very limited dispersal, particularly in rugged terrain.

Western toads require open water for breeding. All breeding members of a local population tend to lay their eggs in the same location, which is used repeatedly from year to year. For example, at one site on a permanent lake in the Oregon Cascade Range, western toads returned each year to the same submerged willow clumps. Eggs are usually laid in shallow water, not deeper than 12 inches (300 mm) but usually at least 6 inches (150 mm). The warmth of shallow water increases the rate at which development occurs; shallow water and vegetative matter may also contribute to protection of eggs from predation by fish. In western Montana, breeding western toads used gravel pits that were only filled with water during spring runoff. These gravel pits contained cattails (Typha spp.) but no other vegetation, and were 5 feet (1.5 m) deep in the center.

== Cover requirements ==
Western toads are terrestrial. Their body temperatures are largely controlled by basking and evaporative cooling. In order to avoid evaporative conditions, they usually spend the daylight hours on the forest floor in the soil under rocks, logs, stumps, or other surface objects or in rodent burrows. Individuals have been observed to use the same retreat repeatedly. In locations where there is little or no hiding cover, western toads may spend most of the day in the water. Under more humid conditions, western toads may become active during the day.

Western toads lay their eggs in water; they require some form of surface cover near the egg-laying location. Woody debris or submerged vegetation is used to protect egg masses.

== Food habits ==
Western toads wait for their prey on the surface of the ground or in shallow burrows dug by other animals. Their diet consists largely of bees, beetles, ants, and arachnids. Other foods include crayfish, sow bugs, grasshoppers, trichopterans, lepidopterans, and dipterans.

== Predators ==
Tadpoles are preyed upon by fish, reptiles, amphibians, birds, and mammals. Toads in general tend to walk or hop rather than jump (like frogs). Their slow movement renders them vulnerable to predators; however, the western toad (like other toads) produces skin toxins that are avoided by many predator species. The nocturnal habit may help reduce predation. Adult western toads are preyed upon by common ravens (Corvus corax) and probably by other birds, reptiles, amphibians, and mammals as well. A badger (Taxidea taxus) was recorded as having consumed five adult Anaxyrus (probably western toad, as it was the only known Anaxyrus species in the area) in Wyoming.

== Conservation ==
The western toad occupies a variety of habitats and is presently listed as a species of least concern. Nonetheless, concerns remain about the impact of disease and chemical contamination of the environment, especially chytridiomycosis. One of the chief chemical threats is the overuse of urea as fertilizer, which is often applied in high dosage to forest environments to increase biomass productivity and economic return. A. boreas is harmed by the dermal absorption of this chemical, which can lead to increased mortality.
