= Edgard Varèse =

French and American composer (1883–1965)

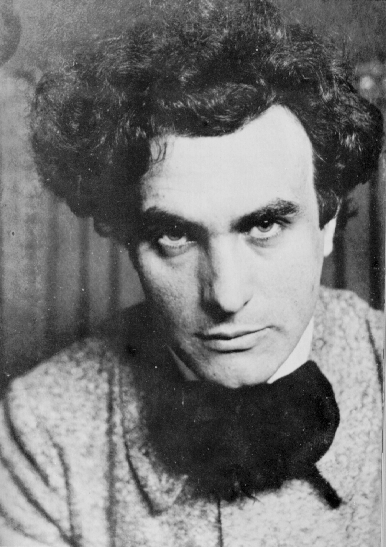
- Varèse in 1910
- Born: December 22, 1883; Paris, France
- Died: November 6, 1965 (aged 81); New York City, U.S.
- Occupations: Composer; music theorist

Edgard Victor Achille Charles Varèse (French: [ɛdɡaʁ viktɔʁ aʃil ʃaʁl vaʁɛz]; also spelled Edgar; December 22, 1883 – November 6, 1965) was a French and American avant-garde composer who spent the greater part of his career in the United States. Varèse's music emphasizes timbre and rhythm; he coined the term "organized sound" in reference to his own musical aesthetic. Varèse's conception of music reflected his vision of "sound as living matter" and of "musical space as open rather than bounded". He conceived the elements of his music in terms of "sound-masses", likening their organization to the natural phenomenon of crystallization. Varèse thought that "to stubbornly conditioned ears, anything new in music has always been called noise", and he posed the question, "what is music but organized noises?"

Although his complete surviving works only last about three hours, he has been recognized as an influence by several major composers of the late 20th century. Varèse saw potential in using electronic media for sound production, and his use of new instruments and electronic resources led to his being known as the "Father of Electronic Music". Writer Henry Miller described him as "The stratospheric Colossus of Sound".

Varèse actively promoted performances of works by other 20th-century composers and founded the International Composers' Guild in 1921 and the Pan-American Association of Composers in 1926.

== Life and career ==
=== Early life ===
Edgard Victor Achille Charles Varèse was born in Paris; when he was a few weeks old, he was sent to be raised by his maternal great-uncle and other relations in the village of Le Villars in the Burgundy region of France. There he developed a very strong attachment to his maternal grandfather, Claude Cortot (also grandfather to the pianist Alfred Cortot, a first cousin of Varèse). His affection for his grandfather outshone anything he felt for his own parents.

After being reclaimed by his parents in the late 1880s, in 1893 young Edgard was forced to relocate with them to Turin, Italy, in part, to live amongst his paternal relatives, since his father was of Italian descent. It was there that he had his first real musical lessons, with the director of the Turin Conservatory, Giovanni Bolzoni. In 1895, he composed his first opera, Martin Pas, which has since been lost. Now a teenager, Varèse, influenced by his father, an engineer, enrolled at the Polytechnic of Turin and started studying engineering, as his father disapproved of his interest in music and demanded an absolute dedication to engineering studies. This conflict grew greater and greater, especially after the death of his mother in 1900, until 1903 when Varèse left home for Paris.

In 1904, he commenced his studies at the Schola Cantorum (founded by pupils of César Franck), where his teachers included Albert Roussel. Afterwards, he went to study composition with Charles-Marie Widor at the Paris Conservatoire. In this period, he composed some ambitious orchestral works, but these were only performed by Varèse in piano transcriptions. One such work was his Rhapsodie romane, from about 1905, which was inspired by the Romanesque architecture of the Church of St. Philibert in Tournus. In 1907, he moved to Berlin and married the actress Suzanne Bing, with whom he had a daughter. They divorced in 1913.

During these years, Varèse became acquainted with Erik Satie and Richard Strauss, as well as with Claude Debussy and Ferruccio Busoni, who particularly influenced him at the time. He also gained the friendship and support of Romain Rolland and Hugo von Hofmannsthal, whose Œdipus und die Sphinx he began setting as an opera that was never completed. On January 5, 1911, the first performance of his symphonic poem Bourgogne was held in Berlin.

After being invalided out of the French Army during World War I, he moved to the United States in December 1915.

=== Early years in the United States ===
In 1918, Varèse made his debut in America conducting the Grande messe des morts by Berlioz.

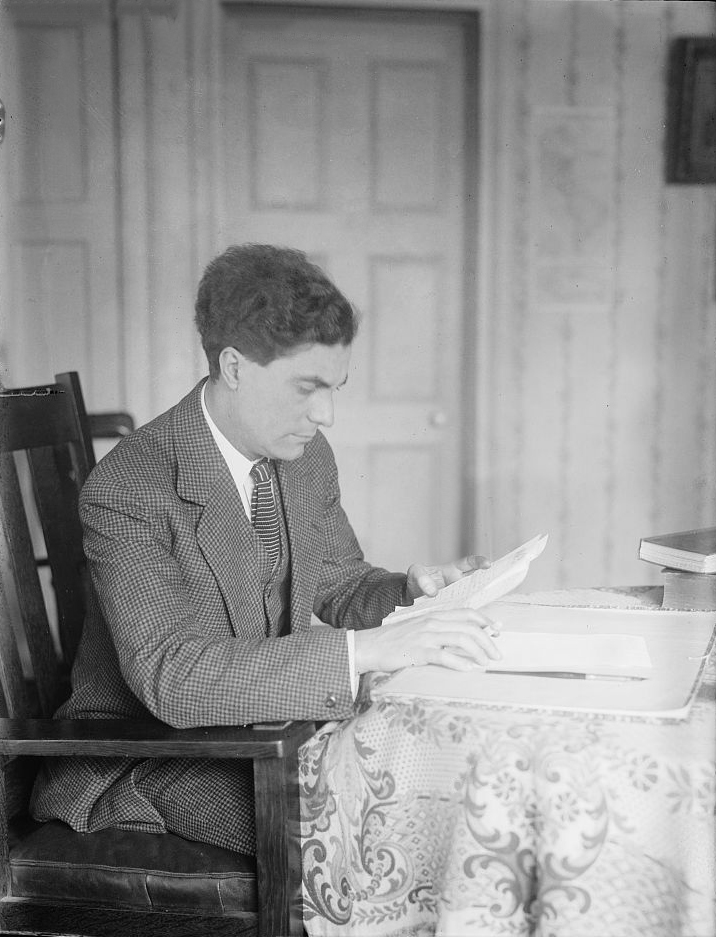
Varèse (1915)

He spent the first few years in the United States, where he was a Romany Marie's café regular, in Greenwich Village, meeting important contributors to American music, promoting his vision of new electronic instruments, conducting orchestras, and founding the short-lived New Symphony Orchestra. In New York, he met Leon Theremin and other composers exploring the boundaries of electronic music.

It was also about this time that Varèse began work on his first composition in the United States, Amériques, which was finished in 1921 but would remain unperformed until 1926, when it was premiered by the Philadelphia Orchestra, conducted by Leopold Stokowski (who had already performed Hyperprism in 1924 and would premiere Arcana in 1927). Virtually all the works he had written in Europe were either lost or destroyed in a Berlin warehouse fire, so in the U.S. he was starting again from scratch. The only surviving work from his early period appears to be the song Un grand sommeil noir, a setting of Paul Verlaine. (He still retained Bourgogne, but destroyed the score in a fit of depression many years later.)

At the completion of Amériques, Varèse, along with Carlos Salzedo, founded the International Composers' Guild, dedicated to the performances of new compositions of both American and European composers. The ICG's manifesto in July 1921 included the statement, "[t]he present day composers refuse to die. They have realised the necessity of banding together and fighting for the right of each individual to secure a fair and free presentation of his work." In 1922, Varèse visited Berlin where he founded a similar German organisation with Busoni.

Varèse contributed a poem to the Dadaist magazine 391 after an evening of drinking with Francis Picabia on the Brooklyn Bridge. The same magazine claimed that he was orchestrating a "Cold Faucet Dance". Later that year, he met Louise Norton, who edited another Dadaist magazine, Rogue, with her then-husband. She was to become Louise Varèse and a celebrated translator of French poetry whose versions of the work of Arthur Rimbaud for James Laughlin's New Directions Publishing were particularly influential.

Varèse composed many of his pieces for orchestral instruments and voices for performance under the auspices of the ICG during its six-year existence. Specifically, during the first half of the 1920s, he composed Offrandes, Hyperprism, Octandre, and Intégrales.

Varèse took American citizenship in October 1927. After arriving in the US, Varèse commonly used the form "Edgar" for his first name but largely reverted to "Edgard" from the 1940s.

=== Life in Paris ===
In 1928, Varèse returned to Paris to alter one of the parts in Amériques for the recently-invented ondes Martenot. Around 1930, he composed Ionisation, sometimes considered the first work for percussion ensemble. Although it was composed with pre-existing instruments, Ionisation was an exploration of new sounds and methods to create them.

In 1928, when he was asked about jazz, he said it was not representative of America but instead was "a negro product, exploited by the Jews. All of its composers here are Jews" (referring to students of Louis Gruenberg and Nadia Boulanger, including Aaron Copland and Marc Blitzstein).

In 1931, he was the best man at the wedding of Nicolas Slonimsky in Paris. In 1933, while still in Paris, he wrote to the Guggenheim Foundation and Bell Labs in an attempt to receive a grant to develop an electronic music studio. His next composition, Ecuatorial, was completed in 1934, and contained parts for two fingerboard "theremin cellos" designed by Leon Theremin, along with winds, percussion, and a bass singer. Anticipating the successful receipt of one of his grants, Varèse eagerly returned to the US. Slonimsky conducted the premiere of Ecuatorial in New York on April 15, 1934, to a mixed reception.

=== Back in the United States ===
Varèse soon left New York City for Santa Fe, New Mexico, San Francisco, and Los Angeles. In 1936, he wrote his solo flute piece, Density 21.5. He also promoted the theremin in his Western travels, and demonstrated one at a lecture at the University of New Mexico in Albuquerque on November 12, 1936. (The university has an RCA theremin in its archives which may be the same instrument.) By the time Varèse returned to New York in late 1938, Leon Theremin had returned to Russia; this devastated Varèse, who had hoped to work with him on a refinement of his instrument.

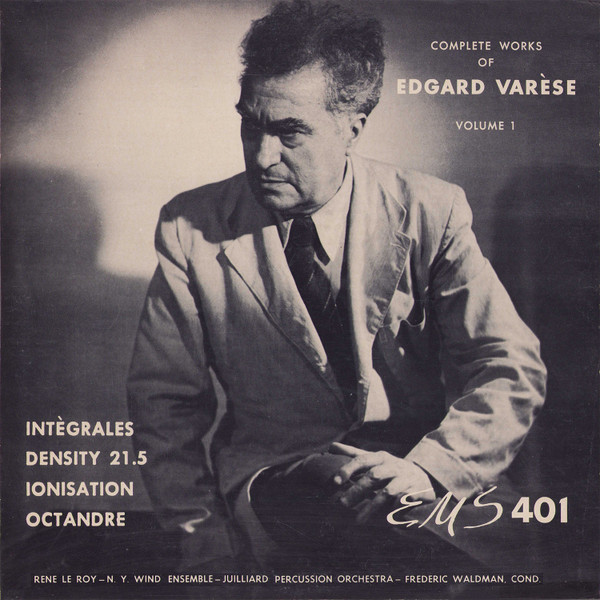
EMS 401

He was approached by music producer Jack Skurnick resulting in EMS Recordings #401. The record was the first release on LP of Integrales, Density 21.5, Ionisation and Octandre and featured René Le Roy, flute, the Juilliard Percussion Orchestra and the New York Wind Ensemble conducted by Frederic Waldman. Ionisation had also been the first work by Varèse to be recorded in the 1930s, conducted by Nicolas Slonimsky and issued on 78 rpm Columbia 4095M. Likewise, Octandre was recorded and issued on 78 rpm discs in the later 1930s, complete (New Music Quarterly Recordings 1411) and as an excerpt (3rd movement, Columbia DB1791 in Volume V of their History of Music). Le Roy was the soloist also on a 1948 (78 rpm) recording of Density 21.5 (New Music Recordings 1000).

When, in the late 1950s, Varèse was approached by a publisher about making Ecuatorial available, there were very few theremins—let alone fingerboard theremins—to be found, so he rewrote the part for ondes Martenot. This new version was premiered in 1961. (Ecuatorial has been performed again with fingerboard theremins in Buffalo, New York, in 2002 and at the Holland Festival, Amsterdam, in 2009.)

=== Background in science ===
While living with his father, an engineer, Varèse was pushed to further his scientific understanding at the Institute Technique, a high school in Italy that specialized in teaching mathematics and science. Here, Varèse became interested in the works of Leonardo da Vinci. It was through Varèse's love of science that he began to study sound, as he later recalled:

When I was about twenty, I came across a definition of music that seemed suddenly to throw light on my gropings toward music I sensed could exist. Józef Maria Hoene-Wroński, the Polish physicist, chemist, musicologist and philosopher of the first half of the nineteenth century, defined music as 'the corporealization of the intelligence that is in sounds.' It was a new and exciting conception and to me the first that started me thinking of music as spatial—as moving bodies of sound in space, a conception I gradually made my own."

Varèse began his music studies with Vincent d'Indy at the Schola Cantorum de Paris from 1903 to 1905. While he was in Paris, Varèse had another pivotal experience during a performance of Beethoven's Seventh Symphony at the Salle Pleyel. As the story goes, during the scherzo movement, perhaps due to the resonance of the hall, Varèse had the experience of the music breaking up and projecting in space. It was an idea that stayed with him for the rest of his life, that he would later describe as consisting of "sound objects, floating in space."

=== Unfinished projects ===
From the late 1920s to the end of the 1930s, Varèse's principal creative energies went into two ambitious projects which were never realized, and much of whose material was destroyed, though some elements from them seem to have gone into smaller works. One was a large-scale stage work called by different names at different times, but principally The One-All-Alone or Astronomer (L'Astronome). This was originally to be based on Native American legends; later it became a futuristic drama of world catastrophe and instantaneous communication with the star Sirius. This second form, on which Varèse worked in Paris in 1928–1932, had a libretto by Alejo Carpentier, Georges Ribemont-Dessaignes and Robert Desnos. According to Carpentier, a substantial amount of this work was written but Varèse abandoned it in favour of a new treatment in which he hoped to collaborate with Antonin Artaud. Artaud's libretto Il n'y a plus de firmament was written for Varèse's project and sent to him after he had returned to the US, but by this time Varèse had turned to a second huge project.

This second project was to be a choral symphony entitled Espace. In its original conception, the text for the chorus was to be written by André Malraux. Later, Varèse settled on a multi-lingual text of hieratic phrases to be sung by choirs situated in Paris, Moscow, Beijing and New York City, synchronized to create a global radiophonic event. Varèse sought input on the text from Henry Miller, who suggests in The Air-Conditioned Nightmare that this grandiose conception—also ultimately unrealized—eventually metamorphosed into Déserts. With both these huge projects Varèse felt ultimately frustrated by the lack of electronic instruments to realize his aural visions. Nevertheless, he used some of the material from Espace in his short Étude pour espace, virtually the only work that had appeared from his pen for over ten years when it was premiered in 1947. According to Chou Wen-chung, Varèse made various contradictory revisions to Étude pour espace which made it impossible to perform again, but the 2009 Holland Festival, which offered a 'complete works' of Varèse over the weekend of June 12–14, 2009, persuaded Chou to make a new performing version (using similar brass and woodwind forces to Déserts and making use of spatialized sound projection). This was premiered at the Gashouder concert hall, Westergasfabriek, Amsterdam by Asko/Schönberg and Cappella Amsterdam on Sunday June 14, conducted by Péter Eötvös.

=== International recognition ===
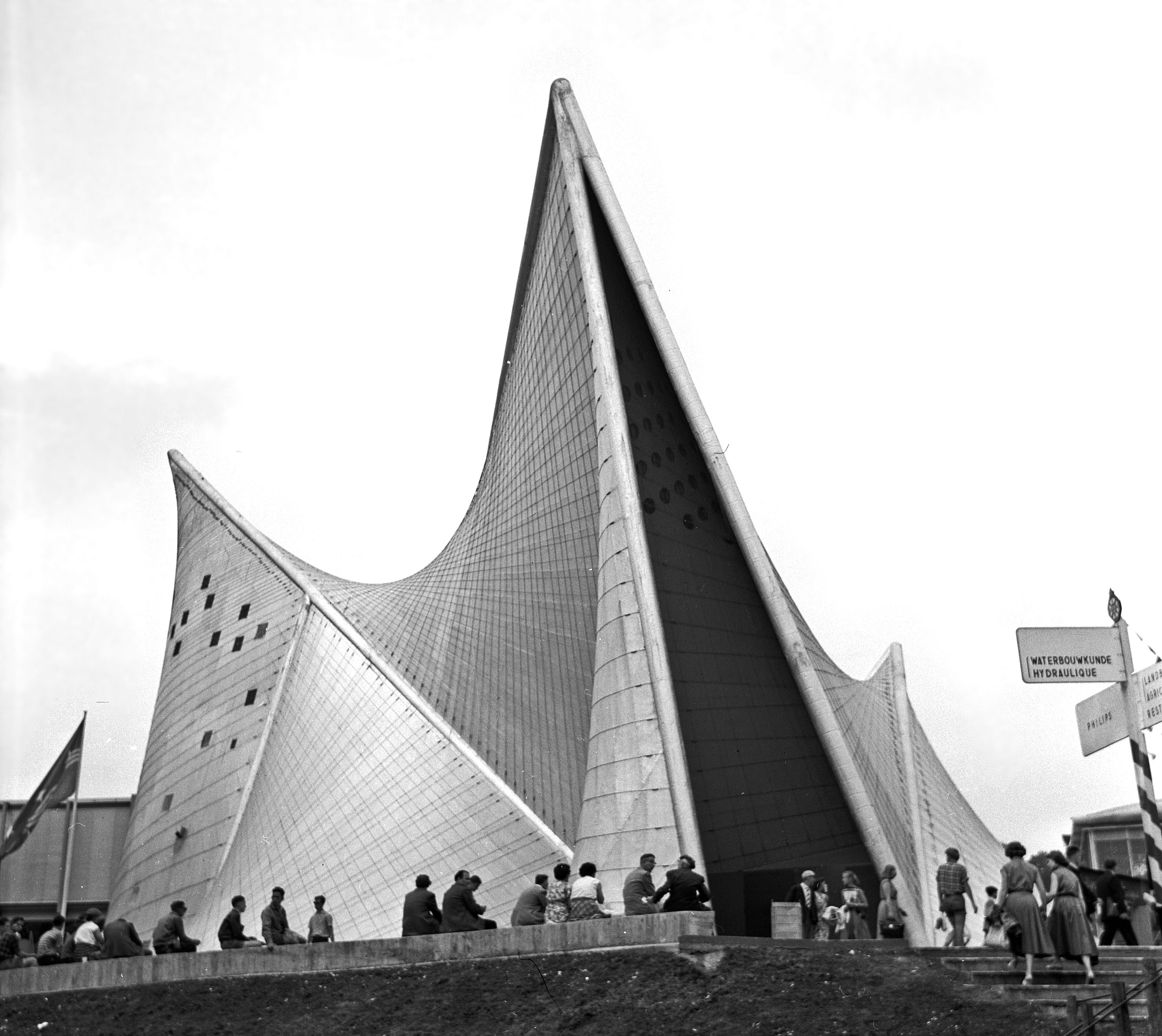
The Philips Pavilion, designed by composer/architect Iannis Xenakis, at the Brussels 1958 World Fair, where Poème électronique was played

By the early 1950s, Varèse was in dialogue with a new generation of composers, such as Pierre Boulez and Luigi Dallapiccola. When he returned to France to finalize the tape sections of Déserts, Pierre Schaeffer helped arrange for suitable facilities. The first performance of the combined orchestral and tape sound composition came as part of an ORTF broadcast concert, between pieces by Mozart and Tchaikovsky and received a hostile reaction.

Architect Le Corbusier was commissioned by Philips to present a pavilion at Expo 58; he insisted, against the sponsors' resistance, on working with Varèse, who developed his Poème électronique for the venue, where it was heard by an estimated two million people. Using 400 speakers separated throughout the interior, Varèse created a sound and space installation geared towards experiencing sound as it moves through space. Received with mixed reviews, this piece challenged audience expectations and traditional means of composing, breathing life into electronic synthesis and presentation.

In 1962, he was asked to join the Royal Swedish Academy of Music, and in 1963 he received the premier Koussevitzky International Recording Award.

In 1965, Edgard Varese was awarded the Edward MacDowell Medal by the MacDowell Colony.

== Musical influences ==
In his formative years, Varèse was greatly impressed by medieval and Renaissance music – in his career, he founded and conducted several choirs devoted to this repertoire – as well as the music of Alexander Scriabin, Erik Satie, Claude Debussy, Hector Berlioz and Richard Strauss. There are also clear influences or reminiscences of Stravinsky's early works, specifically Petrushka and The Rite of Spring, on Arcana. He was also impressed by the ideas of Ferruccio Busoni, who christened him L'illustro futuro in a signed copy of his orchestra work Berceuse élégiaque.

== Students and influence ==
=== Students ===
Varèse taught many prominent composers, including Chou Wen-chung, Lucia Dlugoszewski, André Jolivet, Colin McPhee, James Tenney, and William Grant Still. See: List of music students by teacher: T to Z#Edgard Varèse.

=== Influence on classical music ===
Composers influenced by Varèse include Milton Babbitt, Harrison Birtwistle, Pierre Boulez, John Cage, Morton Feldman, Brian Ferneyhough, Roberto Gerhard, Olivier Messiaen, Luigi Nono, John Palmer, Krzysztof Penderecki, Silvestre Revueltas, Wolfgang Rihm, Leon Schidlowsky, Alfred Schnittke, William Grant Still, Karlheinz Stockhausen, Iannis Xenakis, George Crumb, and Frank Zappa.

Conductor Robert Craft recorded two LP's of Varèse's music in 1958 and 1960 with percussion, brass, and wind sections from the Columbia Symphony Orchestra for Columbia Records (Columbia LP catalog Nos.MS6146 and MS6362). These recordings brought Varèse wide attention among musicians and musical aficionados beyond his immediate sphere.

=== Influence on popular music ===
Varèse's emphasis on timbre, rhythm, and new technologies inspired generations of popular musicians. This group includes Robert Lamm and Terry Kath from the band Chicago, as well as saxophonist and composer Charlie Parker and composer John Zorn.

Charlie Parker is said to have asked Varèse to take him on as a student. According to writer James Kaplan, he begged Varèse: “Take me as you would a baby and teach me music. [...] I only write in one voice. I want to have structure. I want to write orchestral scores.”

One of Varèse's most devoted fans was the American guitarist and composer Frank Zappa, who, upon hearing a copy of The Complete Works of Edgard Varèse, Vol. 1 (EMS Recordings, 1950) became obsessed with the composer's music. Zappa wrote an article titled Edgard Varèse: The Idol of My Youth, for Stereo Review magazine in June 1971. At the age of 15 Zappa talked to Varèse by phone and received a personal letter, but the two were not able to meet in person. Zappa framed this letter and kept it in his studio for the rest of his life. Zappa's final project was The Rage and the Fury, a recording of the works of Varèse. This album has remained in the Zappa private collection.

Henry Threadgill details Varèse's influence in his 2023 autobiography.

=== Tributes ===
- The record label Varèse Sarabande Records is named after him.
- Keyboard player Robert Lamm of the jazz-rock band Chicago wrote the track "A Hit By Varèse" for the album Chicago V (1972).
- American saxophonist and composer John Zorn was inspired by Varèse for his 2006 album Moonchild: Songs Without Words, the first installation of a series of 6.
- Alan Clayson included an arrangement of "Un grand sommeil noir" on his album One Dover Soul (2012)

== Musical philosophy and composition ==
=== Predictions ===
On several occasions, Varèse speculated on the specific ways in which technology would change music in the future. In 1936, he predicted musical machines that would be able to perform music as soon as a composer inputs his score. These machines would be able to play "any number of frequencies," and therefore the score of the future would need to be "seismographic" in order to illustrate their full potential. In 1939, he expanded on this concept, declaring that with this machine "anyone will be able to press a button to release music exactly as the composer wrote it—exactly like opening up a book." Varèse would not realize these predictions until his tape experiments in the 1950s and 1960s.

=== Idée fixe ===
Some of Edgard Varèse's works, particularly Arcana make use of the idée fixe, a fixed theme, repeated certain times in a work. The idée fixe was most famously used by Hector Berlioz in his Symphonie fantastique; it is generally not transposed, differentiating it from the leitmotiv, used by Richard Wagner.

== Works ==
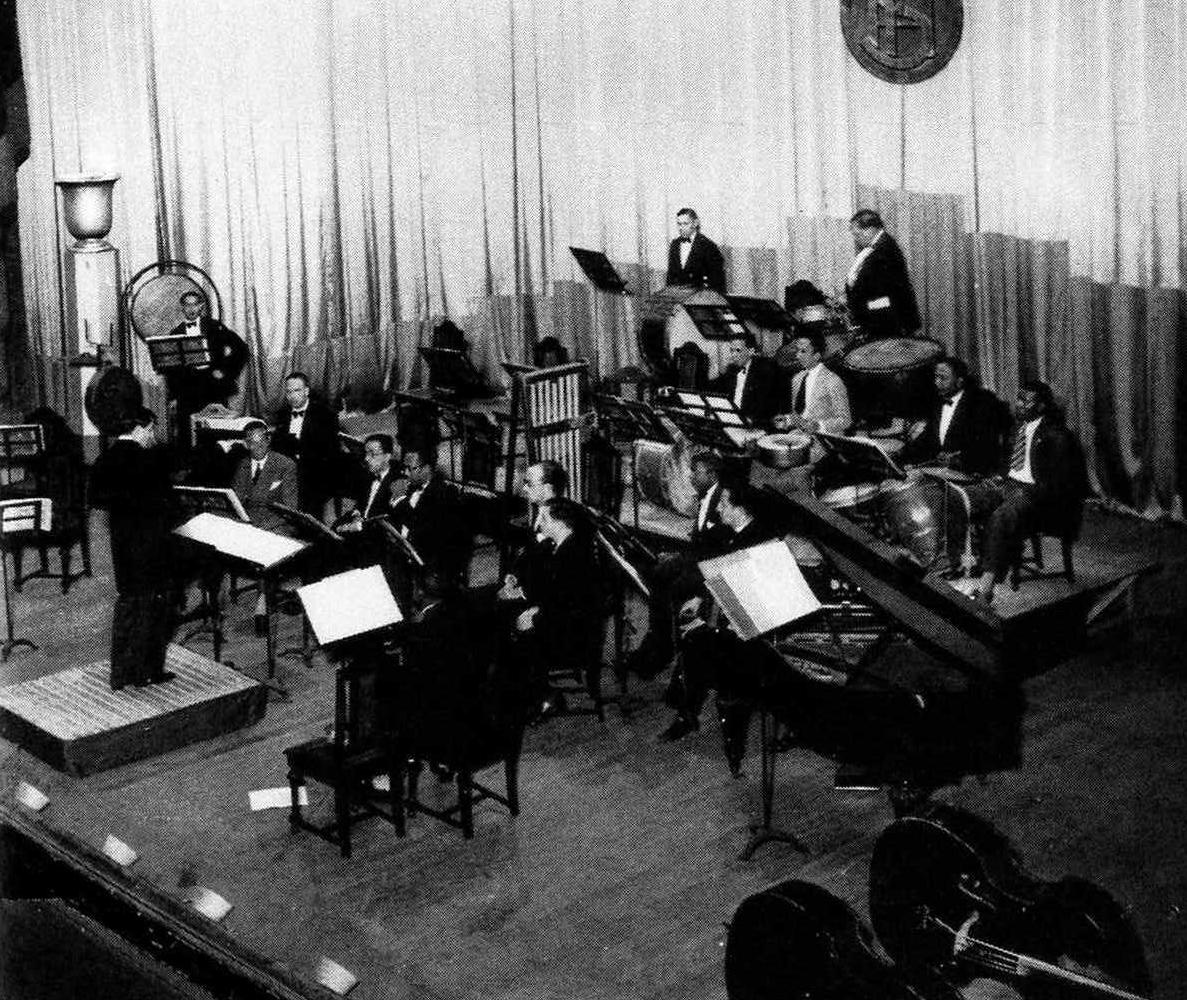
Nicolas Slonimsky conducting Ionisation in Havana

- Un grand sommeil noir, song to a text by Paul Verlaine for voice and piano (1906)
- Amériques for large orchestra (1918–1921; revised 1927)
- Offrandes for soprano and chamber orchestra (poems by Vicente Huidobro and José Juan Tablada) (1921)
- Hyperprism for winds and percussion (1922–1923)
- Octandre for seven wind instruments and double bass (1923)
- Intégrales for wind and percussion (1924–1925)
- Arcana for large orchestra (1925–1927)
- Ionisation for 13 percussion players (1929–1931)
- Ecuatorial for bass voice (or unison male chorus), brass, organ, percussion and theremins (revised for ondes-martenots in 1961) (text by Francisco Ximénez) (1932–1934)
- Density 21.5 for solo flute (1936)
- Tuning Up for orchestra (sketched 1946; completed by Chou Wen-chung, 1998)
- Étude pour espace for soprano solo, chorus, 2 pianos and percussion (1947; orchestrated and arranged by Chou Wen-chung for wind instruments and percussion for spatialized live performance, 2009) (texts by Kenneth Patchen, José Juan Tablada and St. John of the Cross)
- Dance for Burgess for chamber ensemble (1949)
- Déserts for winds, percussion and electronic tape (1950–1954)
- La procession de verges for electronic tape (soundtrack for Around and About Joan Miró, directed by Thomas Bouchard) (1955)
- Poème électronique for electronic tape (1957–1958)
- Nocturnal for soprano, male chorus and orchestra, text adapted from House of Incest by Anaïs Nin (1961), revised and completed posthumously by Chou Wen-chung (1968)

== Notes ==
=== References ===
- MacDonald, Malcolm (2003). Varèse: Astronomer in Sound. London: Kahn & Averill. ISBN 1-871-08279-X.
- Ouellette, Fernand (1973). Edgard Varèse. A Musical Biography. London: Calder and Boyars. ISBN 0714502081.
- Varèse, Edgard (1966). "The Liberation of Sound". Perspectives of New Music. 5 (1 (Autumn–Winter)): 11–19. doi:10.2307/832385. JSTOR 832385. S2CID 192961798.. (Excerpts from lectures by Varèse, compiled and edited with footnotes by Chou Wen-chung.) Partly reprinted in Varèse, Edgard (2004). "The Liberation of Sound". In Cox, Christoph; Warner, Daniel (eds.). Audio Culture: Readings in Modern Music. Excerpts from lectures (1936–1962), compiled and annotated by Chou Wen-chung. New York: The Continuum International Publishing. pp. 17–21. ISBN 0826416152.
- 3 Shades of Blue Miles Davis, John Coltrane, Bill Evans, and the Lost Empire of Cool By James Kaplan. Penguin Random House. ISBN 9780525561002. OCLC 1382524753.
- Zappa, Frank (1971). "Edgard Varese: The Idol of My Youth". Stereo Review. 1971 (June): 61–62.
