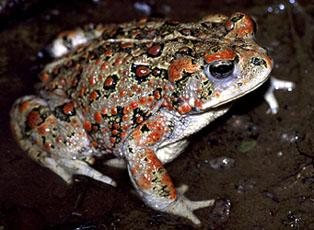

Scientific classification
- Kingdom: Animalia
- Phylum: Chordata
- Class: Amphibia
- Order: Anura
- Family: Bufonidae
- Genus: Anaxyrus
- Species: A. boreas
- Subspecies: A. b. boreas

Trinomial name
- Anaxyrus boreas boreas (Baird and Girard, 1852)

= Boreal toad =

Subspecies of amphibian

The boreal toad (Anaxyrus boreas boreas) is the nominate subspecies of the western toad (Anaxyrus boreas). They are commonly found in the western U.S. and western Canada. Boreal toad populations have declined recently due to an emerging amphibian disease, chytrid fungus. The boreal toad is currently listed as an endangered species by Colorado and New Mexico. It is known in Colorado as the only alpine species of toad.

== Appearance ==
Boreal toads lack a cranial crest, and can be distinguished from the other western toad subspecies, the California toad, by looking at its underbelly, which is covered by a considerable amount of dark blotches. Adult males on average are between 2.4–3.1 inches and females are 2.9–3.9 inches Their coloration can range from brown to green and they have a distinct white mid-dorsal stripe. Both sexes have dry, warty skin and oval parotoid glands. Male boreal toads have no vocal sac and therefore have no mating call.

== Habitat and distribution ==
The boreal toad is currently found in Northern New Mexico, Colorado, Utah, Idaho, Wyoming, Montana, Washington, Oregon, British Columbia, Alberta, and Southeast Alaska. It prefers high-altitude wet habitats (8,000–12,000 ft in elevation) such as lakes, marshes, ponds, bogs, and quiet shallow water Habitat selection for western toads is important because they require open water for breeding, and they can die if they are too exposed to seawater.

== Diet ==
Being omnivorous, boreal toads feed on a wide variety of insects and other invertebrates as well as aquatic and non-aquatic plants. Their diet includes grasshoppers, beetles, flies, detritus, algae, and mosquitos.

== Reproduction ==
The breeding season is usually from May to late July and occurs in marshes and still waters. Females lay on average about 3,000 to 8,000 eggs. The tadpoles take around two months to develop and are usually black. Survival of tadpoles to metamorphosis is higher in aquatic environments with high trout presence, low chytrid fungus presence, and in non-permanent spawning pools. Trout presence decreases predation by aquatic insects, lower chytrid fungus concentrations help tadpoles through their most vulnerable life-stage, and ephemeral spawning pools are warmer, leading to faster and larger tadpole growth.

== Chytrid fungus ==
The chytrid fungus (Batrachochytrium dendrobatidis) causes a skin disease in many amphibian species. It is spread mainly via either contact with aquatic habitats that are high in chytrid fungus load or exposure to infected individuals, but it affects amphibians by feeding on the keratin they produce, which causes keratosis. Keratosis can be detrimental to amphibians because it inhibits their ability to absorb water and electrolytes. This can cause the amphibian to either suffocate or to go into cardiac arrest.

The effects of the chytrid fungus on boreal toad populations are highly variable, with some populations experiencing total extirpation due to exposure and others experiencing a chronic disease cycle in which low transmission rates lead to a 5% year-to-year population decrease. These differences in effect are due to complex host-pathogen relationships between the chytrid fungus, the toads, aquatic environment, temperature, population size, and elevation. As climate change shifts all of these variables, the chytrid fungus is expected to be a stronger presence in many boreal toad populations.

== Reintroduction efforts ==
Attempts to reintroduce boreal toads to both previously occupied and new locations have had mixed results. In Colorado, almost all attempts at repatriation or translocation of mature individuals or eggs have failed. These attempts have failed to result in a diverse age structure of mature adults, especially lacking in sexually mature individuals. However, more recent reintroduction attempts have proven successful with a mature individual translocation effort made in Utah in 2019 and a tadpole reintroduction effort made in Colorado in 2019 also. These efforts have succeeded due to innovations made in their processes. In the Utah project, they utilized the benefits of small refugia-like population dynamics. Chytrid fungus is known to spread at much lower rates in smaller populations, so by introducing smaller numbers of toads to these isolated locations, the chytrid effect was lowered. In the Colorado project, they utilized a probiotic bath for the tadpoles called "Purple Rain" that strengthened their skin microbiome, providing resistance to chytrid fungus.
