= Octandre =

Chamber piece by Edgard Varèse

Octandre is a chamber piece by Edgard Varèse, written in 1923 and published by J. Curwen & Sons in London in 1924 (new edition, New York: G. Ricordi, 1956; new edition, revised and edited by Chou Wen-chung, New York: Ricordi, 1980). It is dedicated to pianist E. Robert Schmitz.

Octandre consists of three movements:

1. Assez lent
2. Très vif et nerveux
3. Grave–Animé et jubilatoire

It is scored for 1 piccolo/flute, 1 oboe, 1 B♭ clarinet/E♭ clarinet, 1 horn, 1 bassoon, 1 trumpet (in C), 1 trombone, 1 double bass.
