= Exercise Croix du Sud =

Exercise Croix du Sud is a military exercise held every two years in New Caledonia, its surrounding waters and airspace. Many countries in the Pacific region take part in these exercises, which usually focus on delivering humanitarian aid, evacuating civilians, and reestablishing security in the wake of a simulated disaster.

== Overview ==
Croix du Sud is the French term for Southern Cross. It is the largest humanitarian assistance and disaster relief training exercise in the South Pacific. France hosts and organises the exercises through its New Caledonian Armed Forces, headquartered in Noumea.

In alternate years, the concept for the next Croix du Sud is developed through a desktop exercise called Equateur. A typical scenario would be a category-four cyclone disaster, resulting in poor sanitation, hunger, disease, and an outbreak of looting and rape which targets foreigners. Other scenarios have included extremists disrupting government control and inciting riots.

The Australian Department of Defence says Croix du Sud aims to maintain interoperability among regional defence and police forces. The exercise is also an opportunity to practise maritime surveillance, along with stability and security operations. The exercise takes place in accordance with a 1992 agreement between France, Australia and New Zealand.

== Participants ==
Many countries whose militaries are active in the Pacific Ocean have committed personnel and equipment to the exercise. NGOs have also taken part. Participants in past exercises have included:

- Australia: heavy landing craft HMAS Labuan and HMAS Tarakan, amphibious landing platform HMAS Kanimbla, landing ship HMAS Choules, minehunters HMAS Gascoyne and HMAS Yarra, Sea King helicopters, infantry from the 2nd Royal Australian Regiment, Hercules transport aircraft, and Super King Air utility aircraft.
- Canada: Hercules transport aircraft.
- Chile: observers
- Fiji: observers an infantry platoon, patrol boat RFNS Kula,
- France: patrol ship D'Entrecasteaux.
  - New Caledonia: Troupes de marine, vessels and troops of the Maritime Gendarmerie, National Gendarmerie, the frigate Vendémiaire, transport aircraft including CN-235, and local civilians.
  - French Polynesia
- Japan
- New Zealand: HMNZS Canterbury multi-role/strategic sealift vessel, patrol boat HMNZS Wellington, helicopters, special forces and an infantry platoon from the 1st Battalion of the Royal New Zealand Infantry Regiment.
- Papua New Guinea
- International Red Cross and Red Crescent Movement
- Singapore
- Solomon Islands
- Tonga: patrol boat.
- United Kingdom: Royal Gurkha Rifles
- United States: Marine Rotational Force – Darwin, troops from Hawaii including US Marines and infantry and civil affairs soldiers from the 9th Mission Support Command.
- Vanuatu: patrol boat.
