= Dance for Burgess =

Composition for chamber orchestra and percussion by Edgard Varèse

- by Edgard Varèse
- Genre: Orchestral
- Form: Dance
- Commissioned by: Burgess Meredith
- Composed: 1949
- Performed: 1950
- Published: 1998 (Chou Wen-chung's completion)
- Movements: 1
- Scoring: Chamber orchestra and percussion
- Completed by Chou Wen-Chung

Dance for Burgess is a lesser-known composition for chamber orchestra and percussion written by French composer Edgard Varèse. Composed for choreographer and dancer Burgess Meredith, it was completed in 1949, but was not published until 1998.

== Background ==
Dance for Burgess is largely based on a short study entitled Étude pour Espace, which was, in turn, part of Espace, a large-scale yet unrealized project that began in 1932. In 1947, however, after a public performance of a reduction for two pianos of the Étude, Varèse decided to discard the project altogether and focus on a new idea, which would later become Déserts and would include much of the unused material from Espace. He then came in contact with Burgess Meredith and proposed an idea of making a short film with sound and images based on Déserts. Even though this project would also never get off the ground, Meredith commissioned a different small piece for the musical Happy as Larry, which he was set to direct and act in. The piece, which would later be called Dance for Burgess, was meant to be an unconventional dance to be played in the musical. The musical closed down immediately after the first performance due to poor reception by critics and audiences on January 6, 1950, which led Varèse not to attempt to get the piece published or performed again.

The writing process of the Dance was done really hastily, as Varèse was pressed for time. Collaborator Chou Wen-chung wrote the original manuscript, which was copied from Varèse's own drafts and with very little revision. The score, completed and reproduced on December 9, 1949, was finished only two weeks and a half before the preview, which took place on December 27, in New York City. A total of three black-and-white copies of the original manuscript still remain, only one of them bearing Varèse's own handwriting (the other two being Wen-chung's).

It wasn't until 1998 that Wen-chung decided to publish an edited version of a series of works by Varèse, among which was the Dance. This composition, as well as other Varèse works republished in 1998, were all commissioned jointly by Casa Ricordi, the Decca Record Company, and the Royal Concertgebouw Orchestra. The score included a series of revisions incorporated from the corrections and additions in the original manuscripts. It was published by Casa Ricordi in 1998 and republished in 2002.

== Structure ==
Dance for Burgess is a fragmentary composition that has a duration of under two minutes. It is score for a chamber orchestra consisting of a piccolo, a clarinet in E♭, a clarinet in B♭, a bass clarinet in B, a French horn in F, two trumpets in C, a trombone, a tuba, an optional string section consisting of an unspecified number of first and second violins, violas, celli, and double basses, and a prominent percussion section made up of three percussionists, playing two sets of three Chinese blocks each, a tambourine, a snare drum, a tenor drum, a bass drum, sleigh bells, a cowbell, a high suspended cymbal, a Chinese crash cymbal, a deep rim gong without a dome, two timpani (one of them pitched to C and the other one to be 30'' to 32'', tuned below its lowest register to produce a strong yet pitchless tone), a güiro, claves, and a string drum.

The Dance is a very characteristic work by Varèse, even though he inserts fragments where uptown jazz and swing are alluded to. The piece is 47 bars long and presents many tempo changes, all of them indicated through metronome markings instead of tempo indications. The piece begins with a = 80, but the tempo fluctuates (with sharp tempo changes) between = 160 and = 60. It presents no key signature and time signature changes are frequent. A short quasi cadenza by the trombone is presented near the end of the piece.

== Recordings ==
| Conductor | Orchestra | Date of recording | Place of recording | Label | Format |
|---|---|---|---|---|---|
| Riccardo Chailly | Asko|Schönberg | May 1998 | Concertgebouw, Amsterdam | Decca | CD |
| Christopher Lyndon-Gee | Polish National Radio Symphony Orchestra | November 2005 | Grzegorz Fitelberg Concert Hall, Katowice | Naxos | CD |
