= Night Owl =

Night Owl may refer to:

- An owl
- Night owl (person), a person who is most active or creative during the night
- Night Owl (film), a 1993 film by Jeffrey Arsenault
- "Night Owl", a Bangkok Post newspaper column by Bernard Trink
- Night Owl (album), a 1979 album by Gerry Rafferty
- "Night Owl" (Gerry Rafferty song), 1979
- "Night Owl" (James Taylor song), 1966 song recorded by James Taylor, Carly Simon and others
- Night Owl (train), a former Amtrak passenger train between Boston and Washington, D.C.
- The Night Owl (1926 film), American silent film
- The Night Owl (2022 film), a South Korean period thriller drama film
- Night Owl Cinematics, Singaporean YouTube channel and media company
- The Nightowl, 1987 Gregg Karukas album
- NightOwl Convenience Stores, Australian store chain
- Keyfax Nite-Owl, a service that provided news, weather, sports, and entertainment information on WFLD Channel 32 in Chicago
- "Night Owl", a song by We Stood Like Kings
- The Night Owl Cafe, a Greenwich Village music club which is referenced in the 1967 song "Creeque Alley"
- A "nightowl" lunch wagon

Night Owls may refer to:

- The Night Owls (song), a song by Little River Band from the 1981 album Time Exposure
- Night Owls (vocal group), a Vassar College a cappella group
- Night Owls (1928 film), a Krazy Kat animated film
- Night Owls (1930 film), a Laurel and Hardy film
- Night Owls (2015 film), starring Adam Pally and Rosa Salazar
- Night Owls (album), a 1990 album by Vaya Con Dios
- Night Owls, a 2024 album by American punk rock band The Dollyrots
- Night Owls, a 2015 novel by Jenn Bennett
- The Night Owls (webcomic), a line of comics by Zuda comics
- Nanaimo NightOwls, baseball team in the West Coast League

== See also ==
- Nite Owl, a comic book character
- The Nite Owls, an elite group of warriors within the Mandalorians Death Watch, led by Bo-Katan Kryze in the Star Wars universe
