= Arcana (Varèse) =

Symphonic poem by Edgard Varèse

- by Edgard Varèse
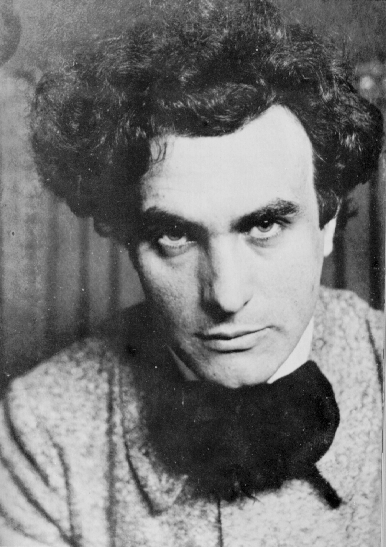
- Edgard Varèse
- Catalogue: IEV 2
- Period: Contemporary music
- Form: Symphonic poem
- Composed: 1927 (rev. 1932)
- Performed: 8 April 1927: Academy of Music (Philadelphia)
- Published: 1931 (rev. version 1964)
- Publisher: Max Eschig; Colfranc; Ricordi
- Duration: 16 minutes
- Scoring: Orchestra

Arcana is a symphonic poem for large orchestra by Franco-American composer Edgard Varèse. It was composed between 1925 and 1927, with a later revision in 1931–32.

== Background ==
According to letters to his wife, Louise Varèse, Varèse first conceived a few motifs in a dream he had on 9 October 1925, while on a visit to Île Saint-Louis. He would later use these motifs in Arcana. He originally intended for it to be ready for early 1926, as Leopold Stokowski was ready to include it in a program at Carnegie Hall. However, the complicated musical language used in Arcana forced him to postpone its premiere, until Stokowski conducted it with the Philadelphia Orchestra on 8 April 1927 at the Academy of Music (Philadelphia).

As explained in his letter, the title 'arcana' refers to the mysteries of alchemy and a quote from Paracelsus's Hermetic Astronomy. Varèse explored the realm of dreams with the musical language present in Arcana, since he believed that the birth of art came from the unconscious and not from reason. The score is preceded by the following text, in Latin, English, and French:

One star exists, higher than all the rest. This is the apocalyptic star. The second star is that of the ascendant. The third star is that of the elements—of these there are four, so that six stars are established. Besides these there is still another star, imagination, which begets a new star and a new heaven.

— Paracelsus

The 1927 score was published by Max Eschig in 1931. On the occasion of the French premiere, Varèse revised the piece in 1932. The revised version was premiered by Nicolas Slonimsky on 25 February 1932, in Paris. Varèse made further modifications, including the addition of the quiet coda, in 1960. In 1964, one year before Varèse's death, the revised version was published by Colfranc. It has been available under Ricordi since the year 2000.

== Structure ==
Often described as a passacaglia, Arcana is a sixteen-minute symphonic poem in one movement scored for a large orchestra consisting of: three piccolos, two flutes, three oboes, English horn, heckelphone, two clarinets in E♭, two clarinets in B♭, contrabass clarinet (Note: The list of instruments in the front of the published score specifies a "bass clarinet (sounding a ninth lower)". The score itself, however, specifies a contrabass clarinet and is written in the bass clef. If the part is intended to sound a ninth below written pitch, it is clear that the latter is intended by Varèse.), three bassoons, two contrabassoons, eight horns in F, five trumpets in C, two tenor trombones, bass trombone, contrabass trombone, tuba, contrabass tuba, sixteen first violins, sixteen second violins, fourteen violas, twelve cellos, ten double basses, one timpanist with six pedal timpani and six additional percussionists.

The percussion section is particularly large, as in many other works by Varèse.

Percussionist	Instruments
I	medium-sized gong, Chinese cymbal (or a crash cymbal), high tam-tam, bass drum, triangle
II	low tam-tam, slapstick, bass drum, triangle, tambourine
III	snare drum, guiro, triangle, two Chinese blocks (high and low with drum sticks)
IV	side drum, tambourine, suspended cymbal (with drum sticks)
V	cymbals, string drum (also called a lion's roar, a single-headed drum with a piece of heavy twine attached to the center of the membrane), and two coconuts (hollow cylinders of wood, 2 inches in height and 2½ in diameter, covered at one end, one in each hand, to be played by striking the open ends of the instruments against a wooden board covered with felt)
VI	xylophone, glockenspiel, two Chinese blocks (high and low with metal sticks), rattle, tambourine, guiro, cymbals, triangle, and three tubular bells

Some percussionists are required to trade places during the piece to take over specific instruments from other performers.
