= Offrandes (Varèse) =

Composition by Edgard Varèse

- Song cycle by Edgard Varèse
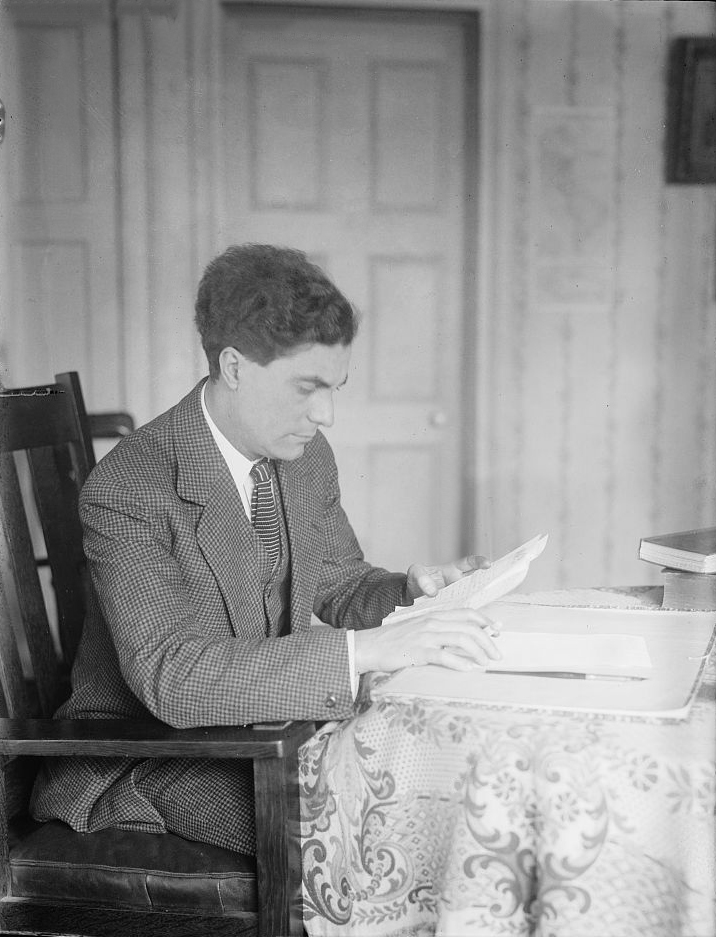
- Edgard Varèse in 1915
- English: Offerings
- Style: Avant-garde
- Text: Poems by José Juan Tablada and Vicente Huidobro
- Language: French
- Composed: 1921
- Dedication: To Louise Varèse and Carlos Salzedo
- Published: 1927
- Publisher: C.C. Birchard
- Duration: 7 minutes
- Movements: 2
- Scoring: soprano; chamber orchestra

Premiere
- Date: 1922
- Location: New York City
- Conductor: Carlos Salzedo

Offrandes (in English, Offerings) is a short 1921 composition for soprano and chamber orchestra by French composer Edgard Varèse.

Offrandes was premiered on April 23, 1922 at the Greenwich Village Theatre, in New York City, making it Varèse's first work to be premiered on the American continent. The premiere was performed by soprano Nina Koshetz and conducted by long-time collaborator and harpist Carlos Salzedo (to whom the second movement is dedicated) with the New Symphony Orchestra, an orchestra created by Varèse in 1919 to secure the American premieres of compositions by other contemporary composers, such as Schoenberg's Pierrot Lunaire and Stravinsky's Les noces.

Offrandes was first published in 1927 by C.C. Birchard and republished in 1960 by Franco Colombo and Ricordi.

== Background ==
Offrandes, entitled Dedications for the premiere, was written on a commission by the International Composers' Guild, of which Varèse himself was the director. This was the first commission out of many, one each year, until the guild was dissolved in 1927. The piece was completed shortly after Varèse released a manifesto praising composers and attacking performers. According to Varèse, "The composer is the only one of the creators of today who is denied direct contact with the public. When his work is done he is thrust aside, and the interpreter enters, not to try to understand the composition but impertinently to judge it."

The first movement is dedicated "à Louise", Edgard Varèse's wife, who was also an influential literary figure and played an essential role in supporting Varèse's career. The couple married in 1922, the same year that Offrandes premiered.

== Structure ==
Offrandes is cast into two movements and has a total duration of just under 7 minutes.

1. Chanson de là-haut (Song from on high). Lent
2. La croix du sud (The Southern Cross). Lent modéré, très lourd

Varèse calls for a soprano and a small orchestra, consisting of a piccolo, a flute, an oboe, a clarinet in B♭, a bassoon, a French horn in F, a trumpet in C, a trombone, a harp, a string quintet consisting of two violins, a viola, a cello, and a double bass, and a relatively complex percussion section (as was customary in Varèse) consisting of a ratchet, a snare drum, a mammoth bass drum, cymbals, castanets, a tambourine, a triangle, and two differently-pitched gongs. Varèse specifies that if the string section were to be larger, the total forces would not exceed six first violins, four second violins, four violas, two celli, and two double basses. The piece also has specifications for advanced techniques for the harp.

The two movements are set to an unspecified poem by Vicente Huidobro and José Juan Tablada's La cruz del sur, the latter originally written in Spanish but translated into French for the composition. In these two settings, the melody did not prevail over duration and timbre, and there is a shift of orchestral powers: the strings are underpowered whereas the percussion is strongly emphasized, both in presence and in number of musicians. Varèse was an innovator insofar as he worked with the entire range and held notes in the extremes of the orchestral range for relatively long periods of time. Varèse aimed to eliminate the performer's lung capacity as a limiting factor, ensuring that long, extreme notes in his compositions could be sustained without interruption.

== Recordings ==
Conductor	Soprano	Ensemble	Date of recording	Place of recording	Label	Format
Riccardo Chailly	Sarah Leonard	Asko|Schönberg	April 1994	Concertgebouw, Amsterdam	Decca	CD
Christopher Lyndon-Gee	Maryse Castets	Polish National Radio Symphony Orchestra	April 2000	Grzegorz Fitelberg Concert Hall, Katowice	Naxos	CD
