= Intégrales =

Composition by Edgard Varèse

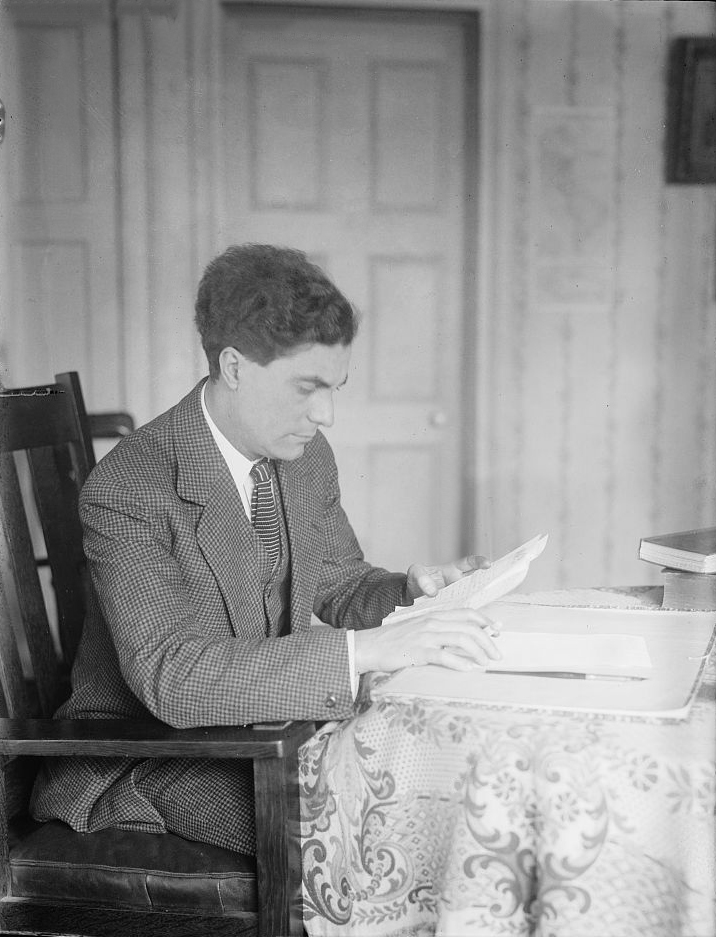
Edgard Varèse in 1915

Intégrales is a work for eleven wind and brass instruments and four percussionists by Edgard Varèse, written in 1923 and published in New York in 1925. It was first performed on 1 March 1925, at the Aeolian Hall, New York City, at a concert organised by the International Composers' Guild (ICG) conducted by Leopold Stokowski. It was also the last piece played at the final concert ICG on 17 April 1927, also at the Aeolian Hall. This was contrary to the ICG policy of only performing a work once, a policy of which Varèse himself was the foremost proponent.

== Composition ==
Intégrales is an early example of Varèse's exploration of electronic music; although no electronic equipment is included in the arrangement, passages of Intégrales imitate the sound of reversed audio recordings, based on his experiments with phonograph records. The composition was conceived for what Varèse termed "spatial projection", arranging specific acoustic elements in locations around the performance hall; while this was not technologically feasible at the time of premiere, Varèse hoped in the future to gain access to such equipment necessary for "realizing Intégrales as they were originally conceived."

=== Instrumentation ===
Intégrales is scored for the following instruments.

Woodwinds
2 piccolos
1 oboe
1 E♭ clarinet
1 clarinet

Brass
1 horn
2 trumpets (one in D, one in C)
1 trombone
1 bass trombone
1 contrabass trombone

Percussion (4 percussionists)

1. suspended cymbal, snare drum, tenor drum, and string drum
2. castanets, clash cymbals, and 3 wood blocks
3. sleigh bells, chains, tambourine, gong, and tam-tam
4. triangle, clash cymbals, bass drum, rute, and slapstick

== Reception ==
The premiere performance of Intégrales was reviewed positively by American music critic Lawrence Gilman: "Unlike Schönberg, he has broken completely with the musical past. ... Originality, to be sure, is not the goal of music. Yet it is something to be able to evolve music that pays tribute to no man."
