= HMAS Labuan =

Two ships of the Royal Australian Navy have been named HMAS Labuan after the World War II amphibious landings at Labuan:

- HMAS Labuan (L3501), formerly HMA LST 3501, a Mark III tank landing ship commissioned in 1946, named in 1948, and sold off in 1955
- HMAS Labuan (L 128), a Balikpapan-class heavy landing craft commissioned in 1973, decommissioned in 2014, and transferred to Papua New Guinea

== Battle honours ==
Ships named HMAS Labuan are entitled to carry a single battle honour:

- East Timor 1999–2000
