= Amériques =

Orchestral composition by Edgard Varèse

- by Edgard Varèse
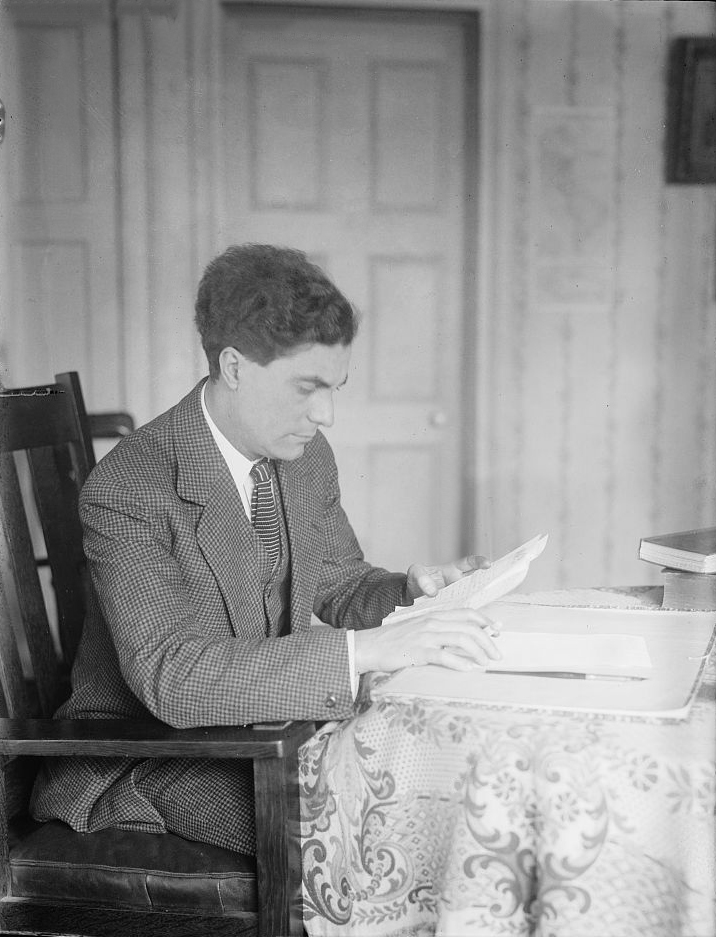
- Edgard Varèse in 1915
- Composed: 1918–1921, rev. 1927
- Duration: About 23 minutes
- Scoring: Large orchestra

Premiere
- Date: April 9, 1926
- Conductor: Leopold Stokowski
- Performers: Philadelphia Orchestra

Audio sample
- A 30-second sample from the original (1921) version of Amériques: file; help

Amériques is an orchestral composition by Edgard Varèse, scored for a very large, romantic orchestra with additional percussion (for eleven performers) including sirens. Written between 1918 and 1921 and revised in 1929, it was the first work Varèse composed after he moved to the United States. Although it was not his first work, he destroyed many of his earlier pieces, effectively making Amériques his opus one (although he never used that designation).

== Performances ==
The original version of Amériques was premiered on 9 April 1926 by the Philadelphia Orchestra under Leopold Stokowski. The revised version was premiered on 30 May 1929 by the Orchestre des Concerts Poulet under Gaston Poulet at the Maison Gaveau. It was first recorded in 1966 by the Utah Symphony Orchestra and Maurice Abravanel. In recent years, it has emerged as a popular modernist showpiece in the orchestral repertoire, with recordings by Pierre Boulez, Christoph von Dohnanyi, Riccardo Chailly and Mariss Jansons, among others.

== Music ==
The work is in one movement which lasts around 23 minutes, with full orchestral involvement almost throughout. Although it opens quietly, with "Debussy-like musing", it quickly builds in dynamic power and is punctuated by massive crescendos which are similar in style to those found in Stravinsky's The Rite of Spring but on a much larger scale. The work is marked by its fiercely dissonant chords and rhythmically complex polyphonies for percussion and winds. It develops in continuous evolution with recurring short motifs, which are juxtaposed without development.

Structurally, the work is assembled by placing a number of self-contained 'blocks' of music against one another in the manner of Stravinsky. The blocks are marked primarily by texture and timbre with melody and rhythm being much more malleable. This remained common practice for Varèse throughout his career.

Commentary on Amériques has focused on its elemental power, and its vivid representation of New York City, not failing to incorporate its howling police car sirens. Varèse used the sirens for structural importance, as representations of a continuum pitch beyond twelve-tone equal temperament. Varèse intended the title Amériques to symbolize "discoveries – new worlds on earth, in the sky, or in the minds of men."

== Instrumentation ==
=== Original ===
The original version of Amériques is scored for the following very large orchestra with additional percussion:

Woodwinds
3 Piccolos
4 Flutes
Alto flute
4 Oboes
English horn
Heckelphone
Clarinet in E♭
4 Clarinets in B♭
Bass clarinet
Contrabass clarinet
4 Bassoons
2 Contrabassoons

Brass
8 Horns in F
6 Trumpets
4 Tenor trombones
Bass trombone
Tuba
2 Contrabass tubas

Percussion
Timpani (2 players)

13 Percussion Players:

1. Xylophone, Triangle, Ratchet, Sleigh bells
2. Glockenspiel, Lion's roar, Ratchet, Whip
3. Tambourine, Gong
4. Celesta, 2 Bass drums, Slapsticks, Gong, Triangle, Lion's roar
5. 2 Bass drums, Slapsticks
6. Castanets, Sleigh bells
7. Sleigh bells, Siren, Boat whistle, Wind machine
8. Cymbals, Gong
9. Snare drum
10. Crow call, Sleigh bells, Lion's roar, Wind machine, Triangle, Slapsticks
11. Slapsticks, Lion's roar, Sleigh bells, Whip
12. Whip, Triangle, Slapsticks, Wind machine
13. Sleigh bells, Slapsticks, Gong, Triangle

"Interior Fanfare"
4 Trumpets (2 in E♭, 2 in D)
3 Trombones (2 Tenor, Bass)

Strings
2 Harps

Violins I, II (16 each)
Violas (14)
Violoncellos (10)
Double basses (10) (with low C extensions)

=== Revised version ===
The revised version of 1927 reduced the instrumentation to the following:

Woodwinds
2 Piccolos
2 Flutes
Alto flute (doubling Flute 3 and Piccolo 3)
3 Oboes
English horn
Heckelphone
Clarinet in E♭
3 Clarinets in B♭
Bass clarinet
3 Bassoons
2 Contrabassoons

Brass
8 Horns in F
6 Trumpets in C
3 Tenor trombones
Bass trombone
Contrabass trombone
Bass tuba
Contrabass tuba

Percussion
Timpani (2 players)

9 Percussion Players: (Note: The low rattle, triangle, sleigh bells, whip, gong, and bass drum 2 are shared by more than 1 player. The siren is specified to be "deep and very powerful with a brake for instant stopping, affixed to a solid base". The "Gong" is a tam-tam, not a Javanese or fire-gong. The instrument identified as a "Low rattle" is translated from the French "Crécelle". A clearer rendition would be "Ratchet".)

1. Xylophone, Chimes, Triangle, Low rattle affixed to a solid base, Sleigh bells
2. Glockenspiel, Lion's roar, Low rattle, Whip
3. Tambourine, Gong, Whip
4. Celesta, Bass drum 2 (head extremely tightened), Triangle, Gong
5. Bass drum 1, Bass drum 2 with wirebrush, Crash cymbal attached to bass drum 1, Gong
6. Castanets, Sleigh bells, Gong
7. Siren, Sleigh bells
8. Cymbals (both suspended and crash cymbals)
9. Snare Drum

Strings (Note: The number of players is not specified in the revised version.)
2 Harps

Violins I, II
Violas
Violoncellos
Double basses (with low C extensions)
