= Utah's Hogle Zoo =

Zoo in Salt Lake City, Utah, U.S.

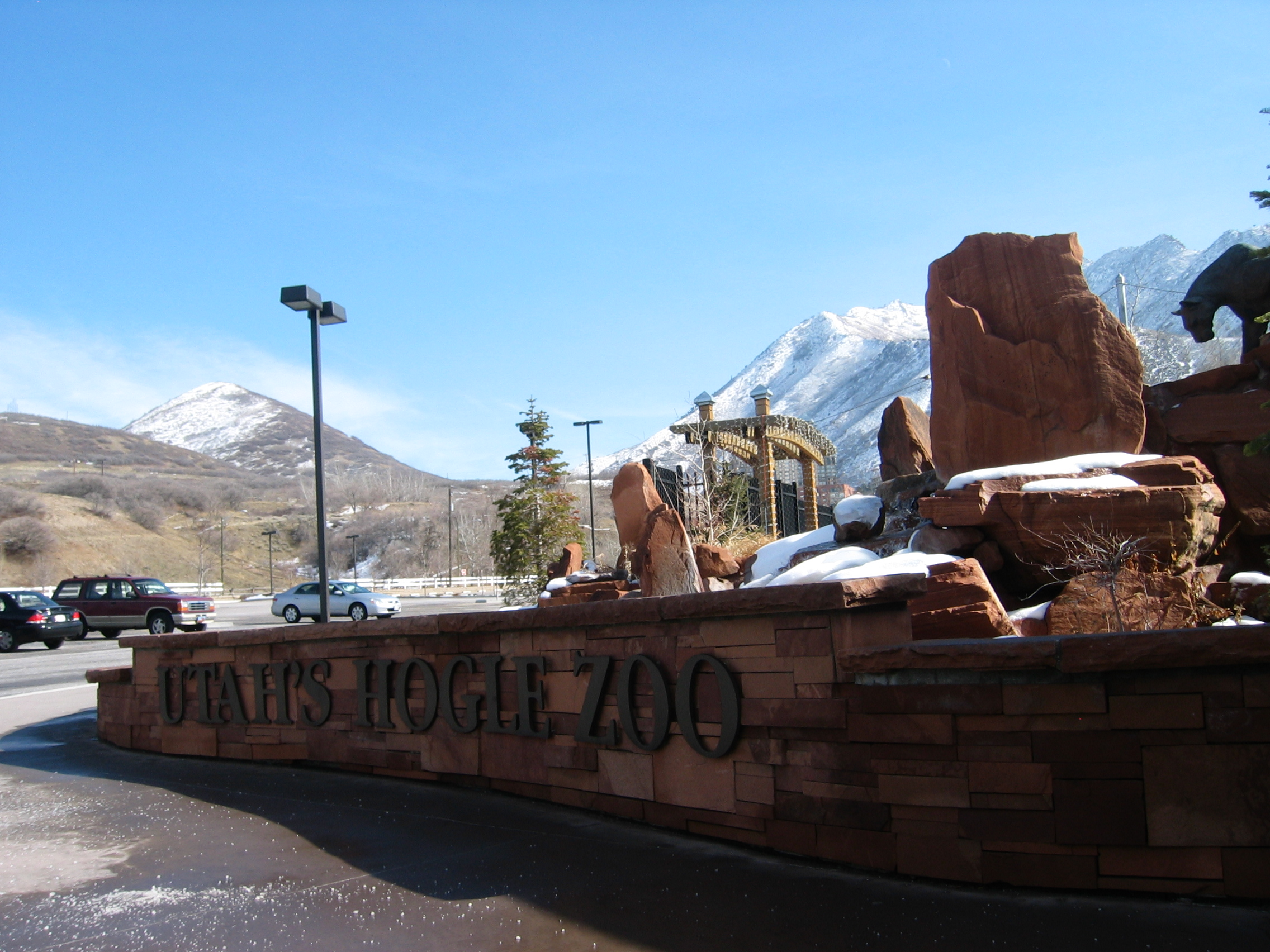
- Interactive map of Utah's Hogle Zoo
- 40.7498°N 111.814°W
- Date opened: August 1, 1931; 95 years ago
- Location: Salt Lake City, Utah, United States
- Land area: 42 acres (17 ha)
- No. of animals: 800
- No. of species: 249
- Annual visitors: 1+ million
- Memberships: AZA, WAZA
- Major exhibits: Asian Highlands; Rocky Shores; African Savanna; Wild Utah
- Website: www.hoglezoo.org

Utah's Hogle Zoo (/ˈhoʊɡəl/) is a 42-acre (17 ha) Association of Zoos and Aquariums (AZA) and the World Association of Zoos and Aquariums (WAZA) accredited facility. Located at the mouth of Salt Lake City's Emigration Canyon, Hogle Zoo is one of the largest zoos in the Intermountain West, and houses over 800 animals representing 139 species.

The zoo is a non-profit 501(c)(3) organization and is supported through Salt Lake County's Zoo Arts and Parks Tax and private donations raised by the Utah Zoological Society and the zoo's board of directors.

== History ==
The zoo has been at its present location at the mouth of Emigration Canyon since 1931 on land donated by Mr. and Mrs. James A. Hogle. Its original location was in Salt Lake City's Liberty Park. In 1916, the zoo purchased Princess Alice, an elephant, from a traveling circus. She gave birth to Prince Utah, the first elephant born in Utah. He died after eleven months.

== Affiliations ==
Hogle Zoo is accredited by the Association of Zoos and Aquariums (AZA). Only ten percent of the United States' zoos are accredited by the AZA. As part of the AZA, Hogle Zoo must abide by strict husbandry, education, and guest service requirements. The organization sets standards for exhibit designs that all new exhibits must adhere to. The association manages the majority of accredited zoo's collection through Taxon Advisory Groups. Animals are only moved to other AZA locations or through programs with European accredited facilities. Every four years, members of the AZA visit Utah's Hogle Zoo to ensure their expectations are being met. As of September 2025, Hogle Zoo was accredited through September 2030.

Most of the animals at Hogle Zoo have a Species Survival Plan (SSP), which is run under the AZA and ensures genetic diversity among captive populations. The SSP pairs animals together for breeding based on their hereditary and gene pool. Most Species Survival Plans focus on threatened species or those at risk of extinction. Other animals in the zoo's collections, including in the "Rocky Shores" habitat, are rescues from the wild.

Utah's Hogle Zoo is also accredited by the World Association of Zoos and Aquariums (WAZA). The organization serves a similar function as the AZA but on a global scale with a purpose of wildlife conservation and the best practices for animal welfare.

== Exhibits ==
=== Small Animal Building ===
On June 12, 1971, the Small Animal Building opened to guests and it includes a number of smaller mammals, birds, reptiles, amphibians, arthropods and fish.

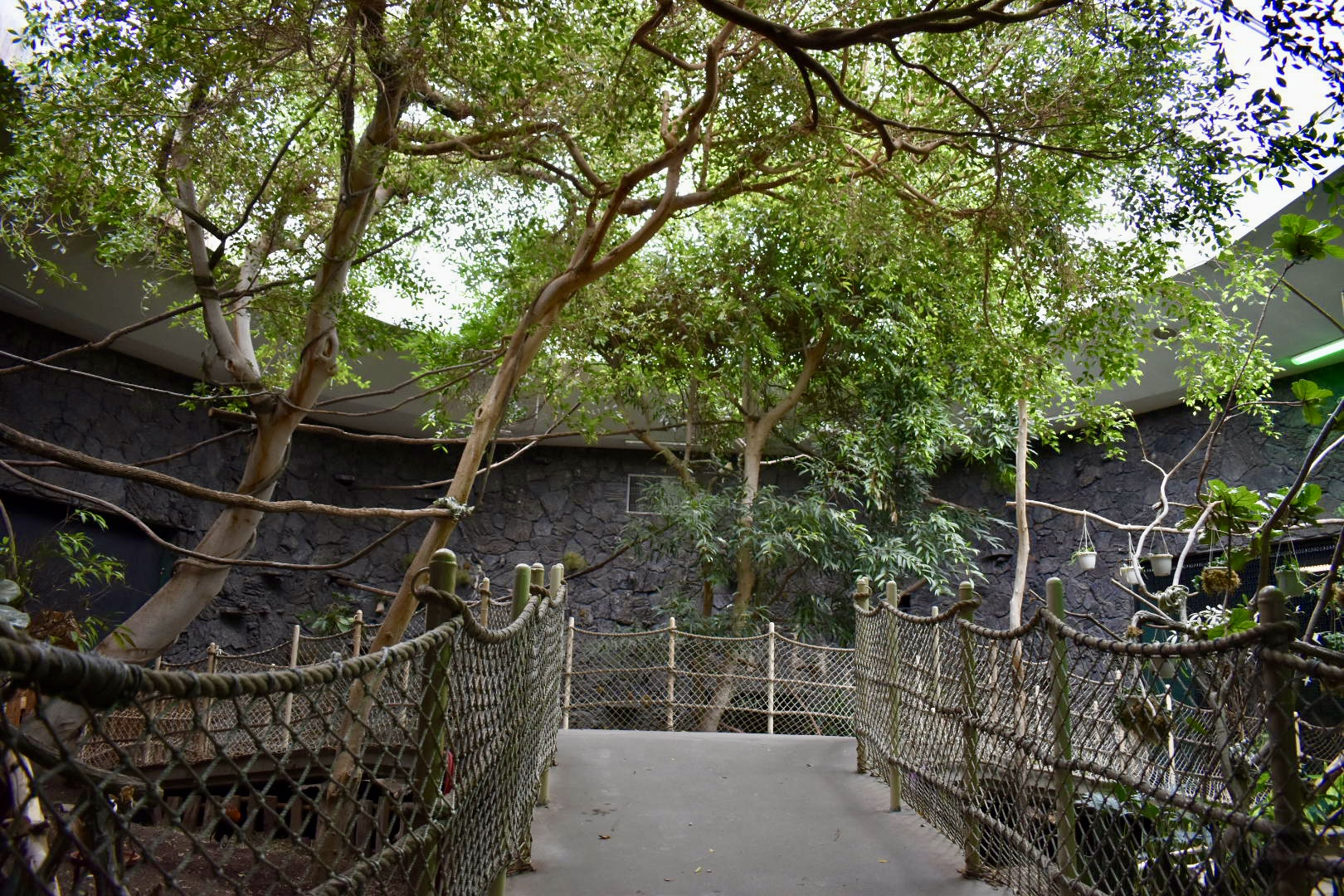
Rainforest Zone

It is Hogle Zoo's oldest exhibit today, and surrounding the Small Animal Building are summer yards for the exhibit's tortoises and crocodiles as well as a hillside habitat for two sibling pairs of red fox.

=== Great Apes ===
The Great Apes exhibit opened in 1983. The exhibit includes four indoor habitats for the apes during Utah's cold winter months as well as two outdoor yards. The exhibit currently features a breeding troop of western lowland gorillas and two groups of Bornean orangutans. The zoo also has successful breeding programs with both apes, which has led to the births of gorilla Addo (in 2024) and orangutan Weila (in 2025).

=== Primate Forest ===
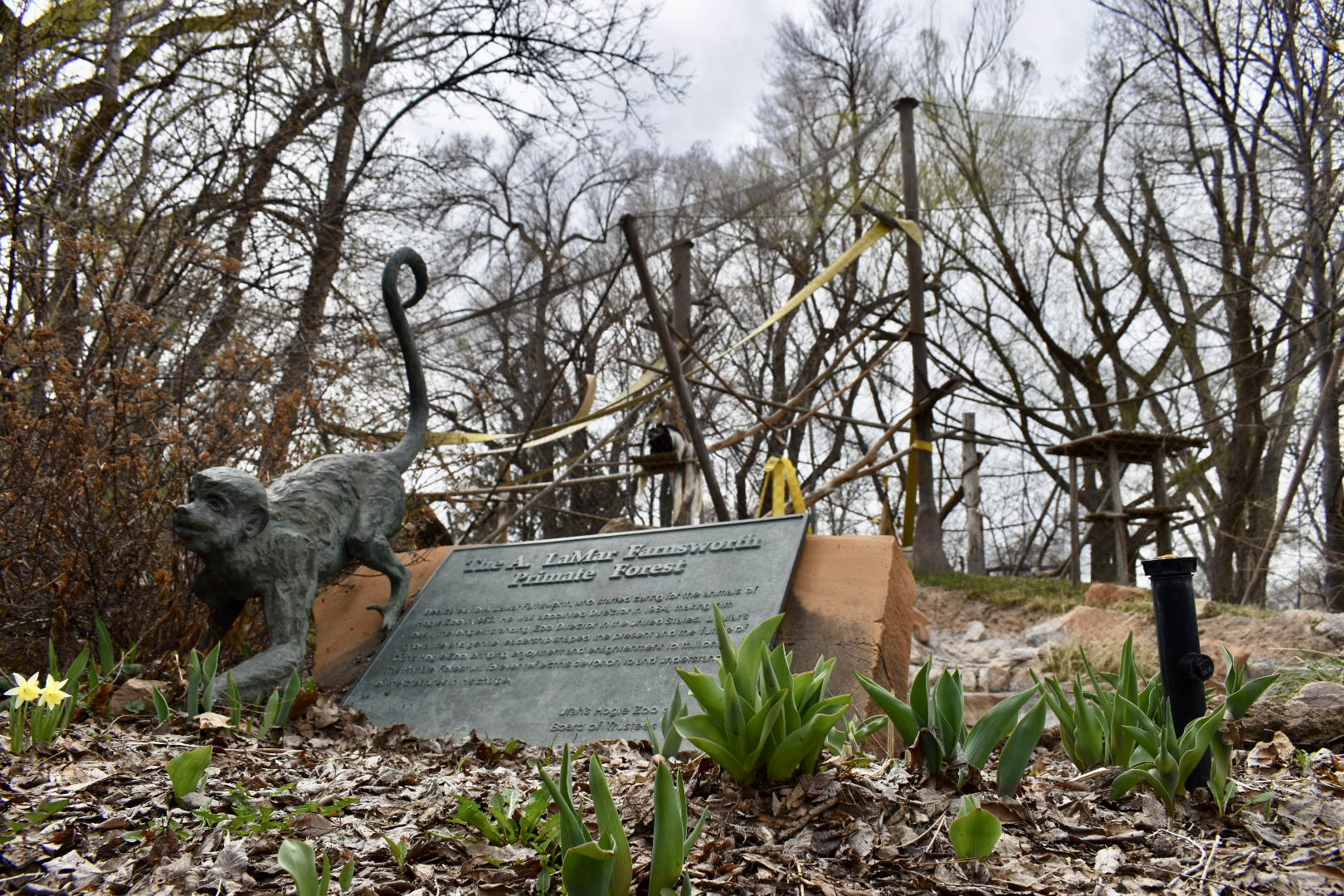
Entrance to Primate Forest

The first phase of the A. LaMar Farnsworth Primate Forest opened on August 1, 1996, when a new exhibit was created for the Zoo’s guereza group. Other primates such as black howler monkeys and spider monkeys are also featured there.

=== High Desert Oasis ===
Originally opened as Elephant Encounter in 2005, the exhibit was rethemed after the Zoo ended its elephant program in 2023. Today High Desert Oasis features threatened species from extreme environments like the Gobi Desert and Namibia’s Great Escarpment. Four species rotate among the exhibit’s three guest-facing yards including Przewalski’s horse, Hartmann's mountain zebra, southern white rhinoceros, and Bactrian camel.

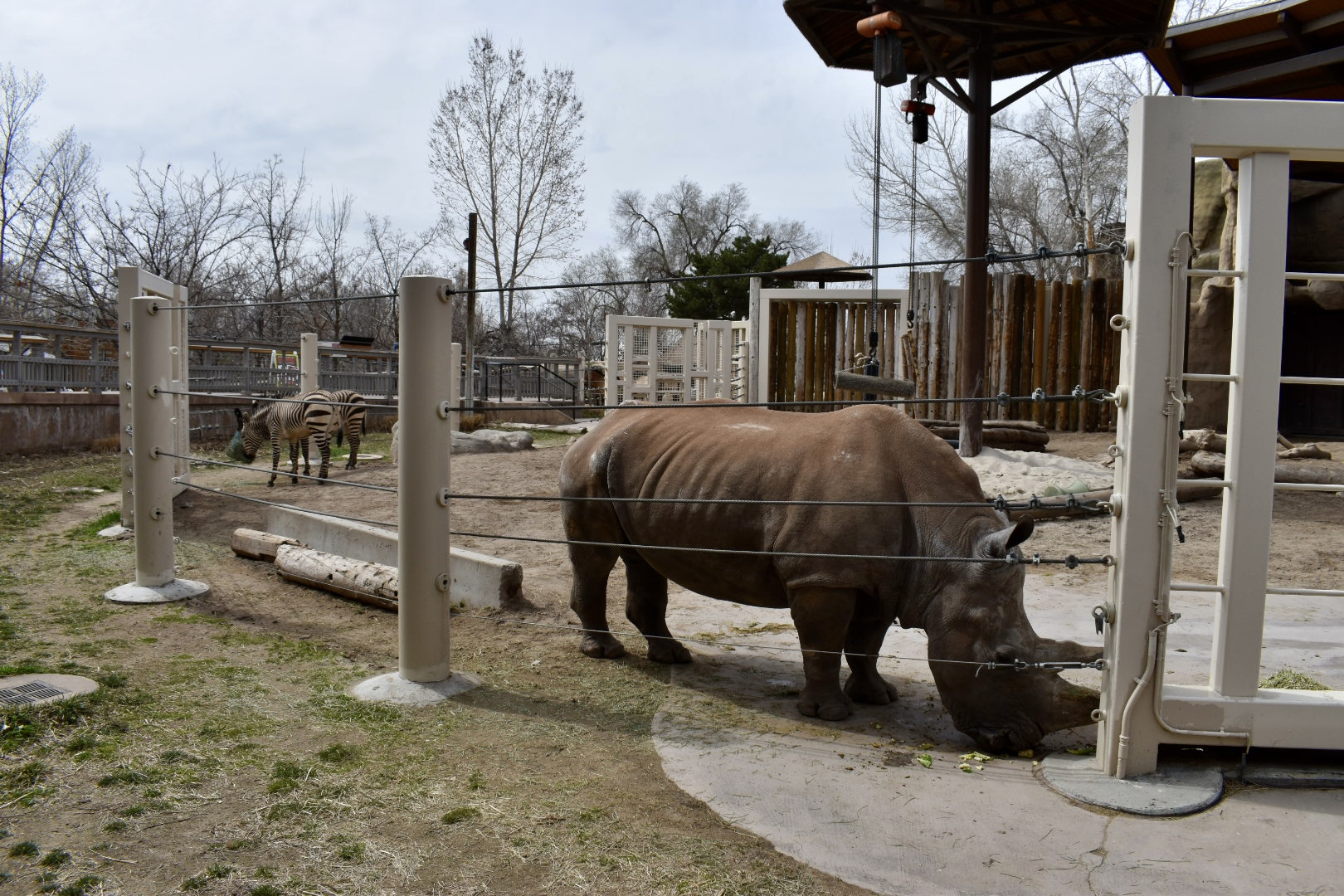
Southern white rhino and Hartmann's mountain zebras in the Lodge Yard

=== Asian Highlands ===
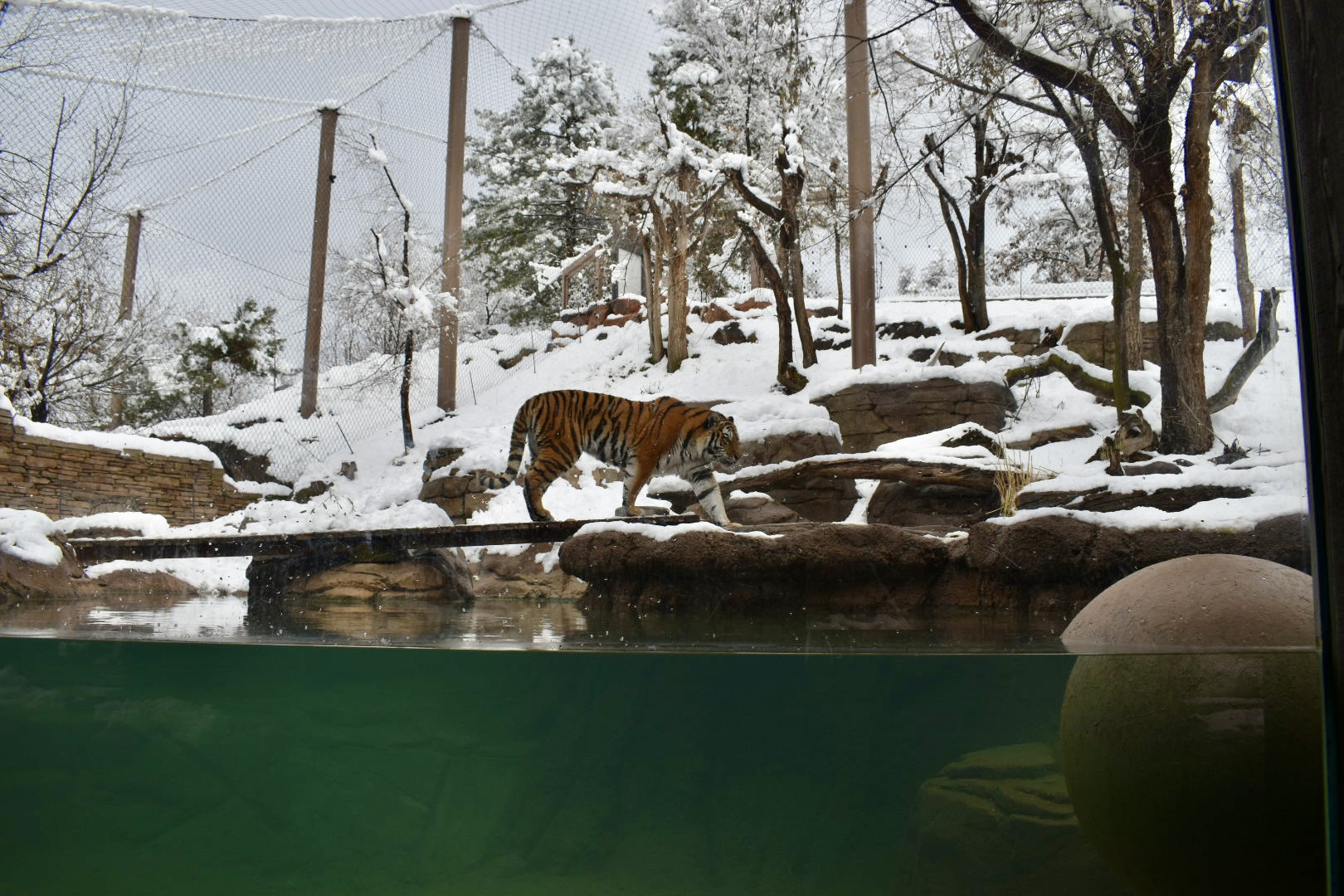
Siberian tiger in Asian Highlands

Just months after the opening of Elephant Encounter in 2005, the old Feline Building was renovated into an Asian-themed modernized exhibit that opened in 2006, featuring highland felids such as Siberian tigers, Amur leopards, snow leopards and Pallas cats. Markhors and Chinese red pandas later joined the collection a decade later.

=== Rocky Shores ===
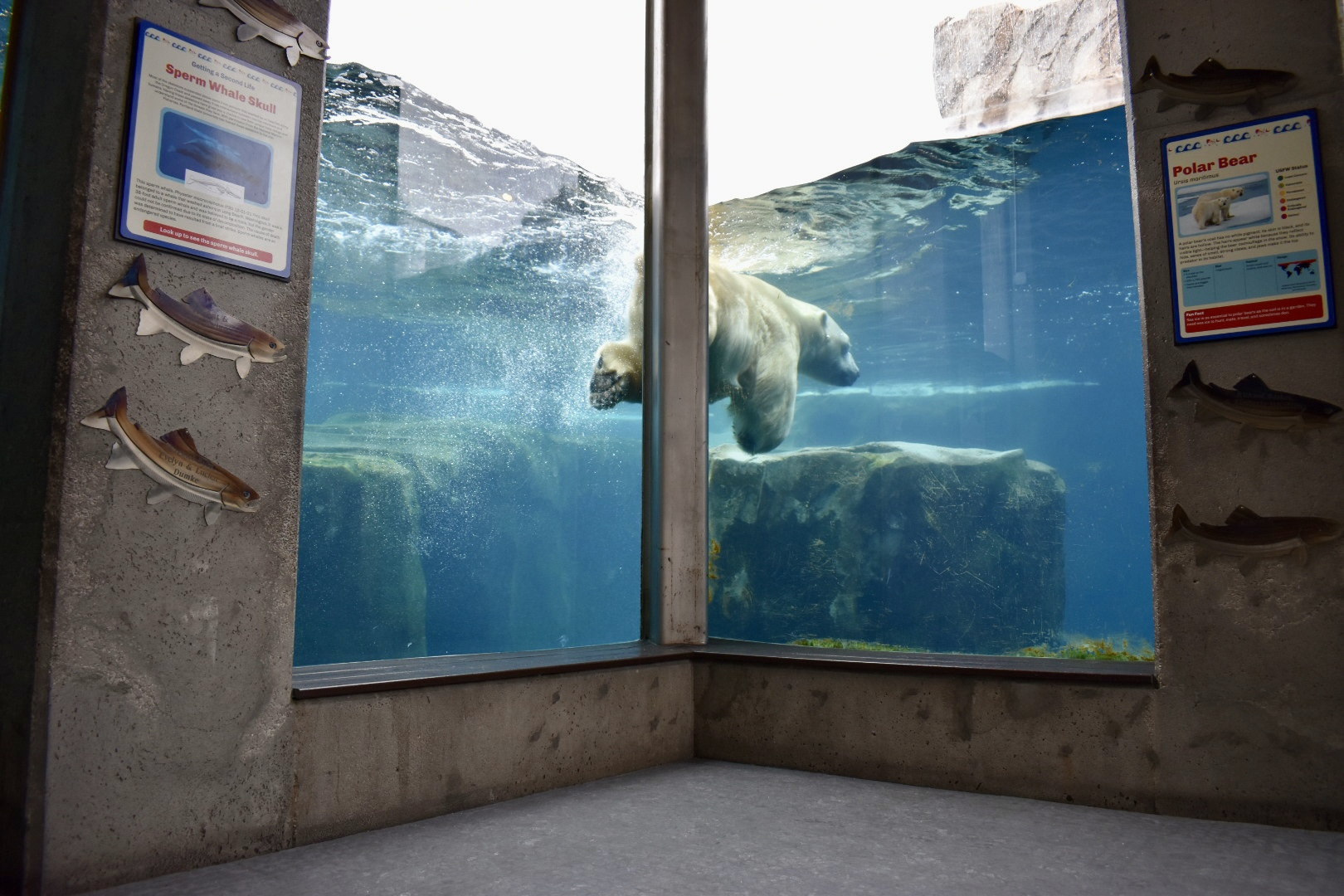
Underwater viewing in Tidewater Cove

Rocky Shores is a modernized coastal habitat and aquarium, built in 2012, and featuring a breeding pair of polar bears, grizzly bear siblings, harbor seals, California sea lions, North American river otters, and bald eagles.

=== African Savanna ===
In 2014, 4.5 acres of land was transformed into two modernized spaces for animals from the grasslands of Africa. One includes space for African lions, while the other, larger space currently includes reticulated giraffes, Hartmann's mountain zebras, common ostriches, common warthogs, and helmeted guineafowl. A third habitat, Meerkat Manor, opened in 2019, and guests can feed giraffes at Twiga Terrace, one of the viewing platforms.

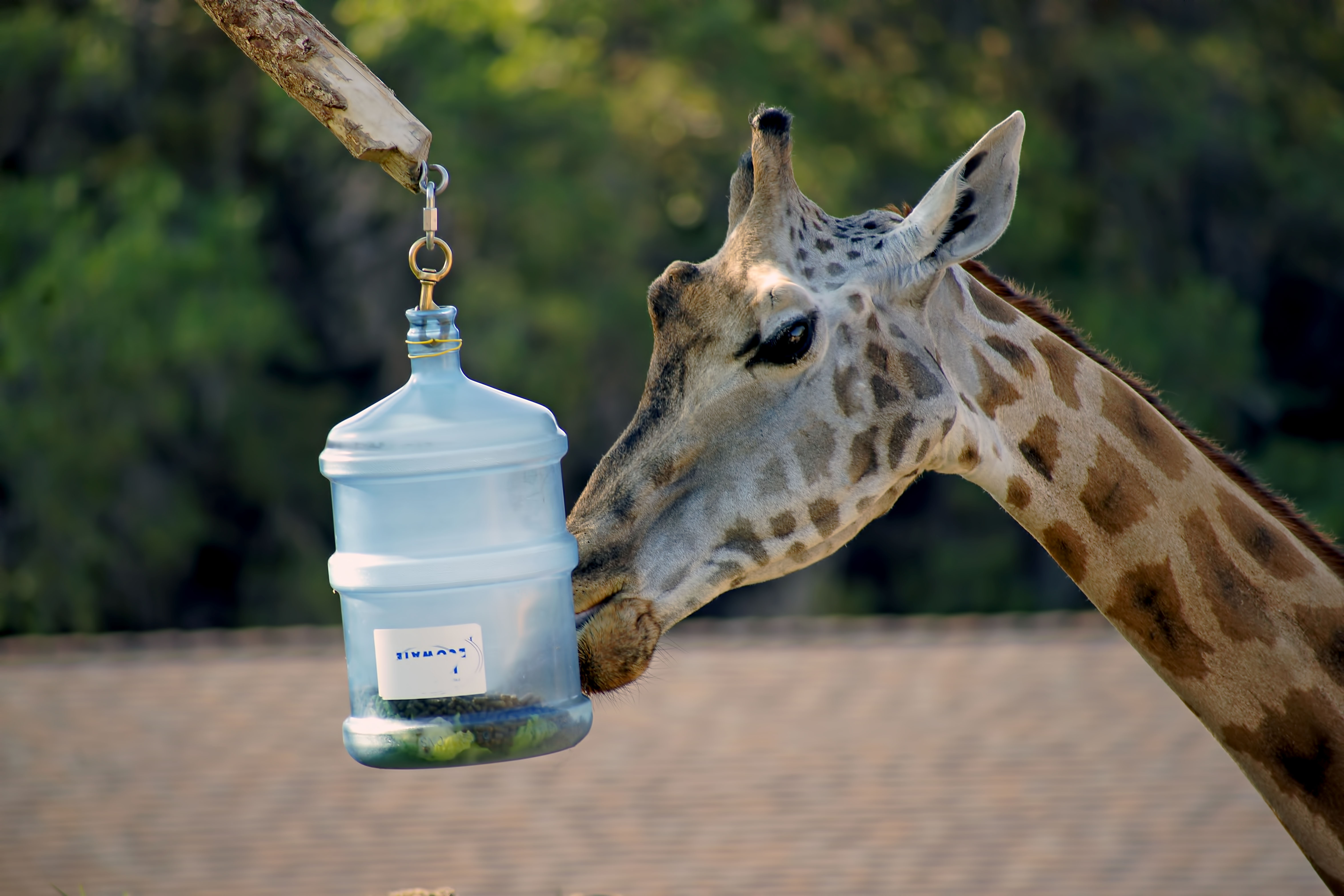
Giraffe feeding

=== Wild Utah ===
Wild Utah opened in 2024, transforming three acres of the zoo's east side which was previously only visible by the train. Featured in the exhibit are Utah native species with the intent to educate Utah's public and tourists about the state's iconic wildlife, such as pollinators, burrowing owls, desert tortoises, mountain lions, boreal toads, desert bighorn sheep, an American badger, American porcupines, gray foxes, a bobcat, and yellow-bellied marmots.

== Attractions ==
=== Oasis Plaza ===
Oasis Plaza serves as a connecting hub in the center of the zoo. Four paths stemming from the plaza lead guests to all corners of the zoo. The zoo's Conservation Carousel decorates the plaza and is a popular attraction. The plaza's Oasis Cafe serves pizza, sandwiches, ice cream, and drinks.

The World of Wildlife Amphitheater is accessible from the plaza. The amphitheater which was once home to the popular World of Flight show, is now home to the zoo's Canine Champions for Conservation program.

=== Creekside ===
Completed in 2016, Creekside provides learning opportunities for children. Programs with the zoos animal ambassadors occur at the Discovery Theater. These programs feature insects, reptiles, mammals, and birds. Creekside also features a playground and boardwalk that over looks Emigration Creek.

== Notable animals ==
=== Dari ===
Dari lived to be the oldest living African elephant in the world. She lived to the age of 55 and died due to age-related problems. She was known for her caring attitude toward the other elephants in her herd.

=== Daphne ===
Daphne was the oldest living giraffe in the world. She came to Hogle Zoo in 1985 from the San Diego Zoo Safari Park. She had nine calves at the zoo. Daphne died at the age of 31, which is double the average lifespan for giraffes.

== Animal attacks and escapes ==
In 1997, Tino, a 450-pound male western lowland gorilla, attacked and bit Robert Pratt, the zoo's team leader for primates. Tino gained access to a room which Pratt was cleaning after a door was left open. Pratt was knocked down by the gorilla and suffered some bite wounds. Pratt returned to work soon after the incident.

In 1999, two zookeepers were attacked by three chimpanzees after a man failed to close the gate to their indoor enclosure. Two chimpanzees were shot and killed and a third was contained and was sent to a zoo in Kansas. Both zookeepers were severely injured. Chimpanzees were absent from the zoo's collection since.

In 2006, Maddi, an eight-year-old female grey wolf, leaped over an eight-foot fence and escaped from her enclosure. She was out of her enclosure for about an hour until zoo officials could secure her and bring her back into her enclosure. No one was hurt in the incident.

In 2011, four spider monkeys escaped from the outdoor enclosure. The four primates did not travel far and were coaxed back into their exhibit by zookeepers. No one was harmed in the situation.

In 2016, Zeya, a four-year-old Amur leopard, climbed through a six by six-inch opening at the top of her enclosure. The sixty-pound endangered cat rested on a beam just outside her enclosure and fell asleep. Zeya was tranquilized and put into a holding area in the zoo's hospital.

In 2021, an Indian peacock attacked four young guests throughout the zoo grounds. This resulted in a pushback leading zoo officials to reluctantly pause care for decades of housing free-roaming Indian peafowl after receiving complaints from the guests' parents about any disregard for safety and intervention. The remaining two peahens were briefly rotated between Primate Forest and South Pathway but were since relocated as well, resulting in the species' absence.

== Conservation efforts ==
Conservation efforts at Hogle include a reduce, reuse, recycle program, water conservation, and earth-friendly biodegradable products. The zoo's efforts were recognized in 2005 by the Recycling Coalition of Utah, and it received the Thomas A. Martin Utah Recycler of the Year award for a non-profit business.

Following a June 2010 oil spill from an underground Chevron pipeline in Red Butte Creek, 150 to 200 birds, many of them Canada geese, came in contact with the oil and were taken to Hogle Zoo to be cleaned.

The Big Six Program is the Hogle Zoo's biggest conservation program. The program works with six organizations that are working with six endangered species. The big six animals that are a part of the program include the African lion, Bornean orangutan, polar bear, African elephant, radiated tortoise, and boreal toad.

=== Wildlife reintroductions ===
In the 1960s concern grew for the dwindling population of America's symbol the bald eagle. The species was declared an endangered species in 1967 after DDT poisoning had decimated North America's population. Reintroduction efforts were needed to help bolster the remaining wild individuals. Sam and Betsy, Hogle Zoo's mated pair in the Woodland Edge exhibit had successfully produced fertile eggs in 1989, 1990, and 1991. All three of their chicks were determined good candidates for release as their genetics were not well represented in wild populations. The 1989 chick was released in Arkansas and the 1991 chick in Georgia. The chick from 1990 was unfortunately lost to predation from a red fox after its release. Without the banning of DDT in 1972 and reintroduction efforts made by organizations like Utah's Hogle Zoo, the bald eagle would have not recovered and been taken off the endangered species list in 2007.

The golden lion tamarin, a small New World monkey, has lost all but two to five percent of the species' original habitat in Brazil. The first population estimate in 1972, found between 400-500 golden lion tamarins left. From 1984 to 2001, an extensive effort to reintroduce the species to its native habitat took place involving 43 institutions in 8 countries. Utah's Hogle Zoo was involved in this effort. On April 29, 1993, Hogle Zoo sent Bagel, a male golden lion tamarin, to the Smithsonian's National Zoo's former Center for Biological Research for a quarantine period in preparation to be released into the wild. On February 4, 1994, Bagel was introduced into the Poço das Antas Biological Reserve in southeastern Brazil, one of three small areas left in the wild that are home to the critically endangered species.

On May 1, 1991, twin female black-and-white ruffed lemurs, a critically endangered species from Madagascar, were born in Hogle Zoo's former Primate Building. Born through a recommendation made by the Species Survival Plan, the twins were well-represented genetically in the North American population and therefore were considered good candidates for release into the wild. After seven years of being raised by their parents at Hogle Zoo, the two females began their journey to rewilding. On June 2, 1998, they arrived at the Duke Lemur Center in North Carolina where they joined four more lemurs that planned to be released to the wild. They spent around four months at the Duke Lemur Center where they had little contact with humans to help prepare for life in the wild. After completing the necessary training at the center, the twins, who had been named Dawn and Jupiter, were flown to the Betampona Reserve in the Atsinanana Region of Madagascar on October 27, 1998. After completing a standard quarantine, they were released alongside the four other lemurs into the natural reserve on November 25, 1998, helping to boost the critically endangered species' numbers.

The boreal toad is an endangered subspecies of western toad found in alpine wetlands of the western United States. The species has suffered a decline over the last twenty years due to habitat loss and a fatal fungal disease. Hogle Zoo opened their Boreal Toad Conservation Center in 2015. The center housed eggs from the subspecies that were collected from the wild. The plan was to raise the eggs to adulthood, breed them, then release their offspring into restored habitats. In August 2021, Hogle Zoo released 21 boreal toads onto the Paunsaugunt Plateau in southern Utah.

== Closed exhibits ==
=== Monkey Island ===
Monkey Island was the first exhibit to be constructed for Salt Lake City’s new zoo at the mouth of Emigration Canyon. Modeled after a similar exhibit at the Tulsa Zoo, the exhibit would focus on the Zoo’s new philosophy to be barless. Instead of displaying the Zoo’s primates in cages, the inhabitants of Monkey Island were contained via a moat.

From July 25, 1931 to 1964, rhesus macaques and long-tailed macaques would be rotated as main attractions of the exhibit. From 1964 until closing for renovations, spider monkeys, capuchin monkeys and even woolly monkeys would later be put on display at Monkey Island.

After sixty-five years of displaying animals, Monkey Island was demolished in 1996 when construction on Primate Forest began. The new exhibit offered modern amenities for the Zoo’s primates including naturalistic indoor and outdoor habitats.

=== West End ===
In 2012, Hogle Zoo's northwest end was transformed into Rocky Shores, an exhibit dedicated to animals from North America's coastlines. This three-acre site was historically home to major exhibits like Bear Grotto, Penguin Cove, and the former African Savanna as well as several other animal habitats.

==== Cougar Grotto ====
In 1957, the Zoo opened an exhibit for cougars. Large red cement rocks were made to mimic their natural habitat in southern Utah. The zoo's two cougars were orphaned brothers. Snow leopards were held in the exhibit while construction was being completed on Asian Highlands.

==== Bear Grotto ====
Bear Grotto opened in 1958. The exhibit, reminiscent of Carl Hagenbeck's designs of the late 1900s, was intended for the zoo's polar bears and Kodiak bears. The two habitats, each 40 by 60 feet, had 15 foot deep moats separating guests from the bears and extensive rockwork. Bear Grotto's first inhabitants were a male and female polar bear pair. The two were born in the wild in Canada's Northwest Territories. The polar bears moved to Hogle Zoo on March 28, 1957, in preparation for the exhibit's opening. The male and female cubs were named Klondike and Kate via a contest in which a seven year old boy won a trip to Disneyland with his parents.

Klondike died in 1978 and Kate died in 1985. The zoo was hopeful for cubs and brought in Bubba, a male from the Oregon Zoo in 1978 and Chinook in 1979 from the Memphis Zoo. The two proved to be a successful mated pair. Chinook welcomed her first cub, a female, on November 4, 1985. With Bubba, Chinook gave birth to a male in 1987, twins Aurora and Bubba in 1989, and a male Denali in 1993. Chinook's mate Bubba died on December 22, 1993, due to pancreatitis.

Due to Chinook's success as a mother, the zoo was looking to find a new mate for her. On June 23, 1995, the zoo welcomed Andy from the Buffalo Zoo where he had been born in 1989. The next year, Chinook gave birth to male twins Koluk and Kiska on November 19, 1996. Two years later she had another set of male twins named Alcor and Mizar. Chinook's last cub, a female named Anana, was born on December 12, 2000. It was decided to not allow Chinook to become pregnant again due to her age. Chinook was described as a protective defender and gentle, nurturing caregiver. The bear mother was euthanized on December 18, 2002, after keepers had been monitoring escalating health problems. Chinook was one of the most prolific polar bears in North American zoo history giving birth to a total of ten cubs. Currently she is survived by Denali who lives at the Sapparo Zoo in Japan and Kiska at the ABQ BioPark. However, many of her grandchildren still populate U.S. zoos.

In 2003, Andy died from an intestinal blockage after swallowing a glove that was thrown into his exhibit. The blockage caused a rupture in the intestinal wall, leading to leakage of intestinal contents and fatal blood poisoning. The zoo would not go on to bring polar bears back into their collection until the opening of Rocky Shores in 2012.

In July 2002, Dale, a female black bear, went on display in Bear Grotto. She was an orphan that was rescued from Minnesota. In 2003, Cubby, a male black bear, moved to Hogle Zoo from the Chahinkapa Zoo in North Dakota. Then in 2004, Tuff, a male black bear, came to live at Hogle Zoo. Tuff was born at a private breeder's farm in Missouri. He was then sold illegally. However, he was confiscated by officials and moved to a licensed facility. Tuff moved to Hogle Zoo shortly after. All of the black bears were moved to the Oregon Zoo because Hogle Zoo was going to start construction on their Rocky Shores exhibit.

==== Mountain Habitat ====
In July 1962, construction of a mountain habitat was completed in between the Bear and Cougar Grottoes for aoudad, also known as Barbary sheep. The exhibit was originally home to five members of the sheep native to Northern Africa - one male and four females. They arrived via rail from Fresno, California, where they had been purchased for $50 each. The exhibit was home to a plethora of animals over the years before its demolition in 2010.

In 1974, Hogle Zoo received its first two stone sheep, a subspecies of Dall sheep found in Canada and popular in big game hunting. The pair, only a year old upon their arrival, were born at the Okanagan Game Farm where then zoo director LaMar Farnsworth had a connection. At the time of their display, Hogle Zoo was the only zoo in the United States to exhibit the subspecies. The herd, which began to grow in size through births and other acquisitions, took up residence in the Mountain Habitat. When the zoo's herd began to die off, the final member, an elderly male affectionately named "Stone Sheep", was moved to the desert bighorn sheep exhibit on South Rim. The Mountain Habitat then became a summer habitat for the zoo's Aldabra tortoises.

Chacoan peccaries were the last species to inhabit the exhibit before it was demolished for the construction of Rocky Shores in 2010. The four new peccaries made their debut in 2004 on the Fourth of July. The all male group consisted of Walker and Palito from the Saint Louis Zoo as well as Chili Pepper and Habanero from the Phoenix Zoo. The four males moved to the Woodland Edge exhibit in Discovery Land in 2010 before permanently leaving the zoo's collection in 2012 when construction began on the African Savanna.

==== South American exhibit ====
In February 1968, work began on a new exhibit dedicated to animals from South America. The construction was completed by Ralph Kramer Construction Co. just west of the Sea Lion Pool. The project, which cost $18,000, also included a new exhibit for blackbuck that was carved out of the existing elk run and a refreshment stand. The South American exhibit included a building with two large rooms and three smaller rooms each with windows allowing guests to view the warm climate animals during Utah's winter. A large outdoor yard provided the animals with a mixed species habitat. Both indoor and outdoor spaces included pools for the animals to wade in. Animal residents included pairs of lowland tapirs, giant anteaters, capybaras, and jabirus as well as three rheas and almost two dozen parrots.

The exhibit's first residents were the pair of young giant anteaters who arrived at the Zoo on April 16, 1968. After being caught in the wild, the pair spent four months in Florida before being traded by the Zoo for a male jaguar. The following month a pair of lowland tapirs would join the anteaters. The tapir were successful breeders, welcoming two male calves on July 9, 1970 and October 6, 1971. On June 5, 1968, a pair of jabirus, a species of stork, joined the exhibit after being caught in the wild and purchased through an animal dealer in Miami, Florida. The jabirus joined the already present rheas and parrots. Last to join the South American exhibit were a pair of capybara, the world's largest species of rodent.

==== African Savanna ====
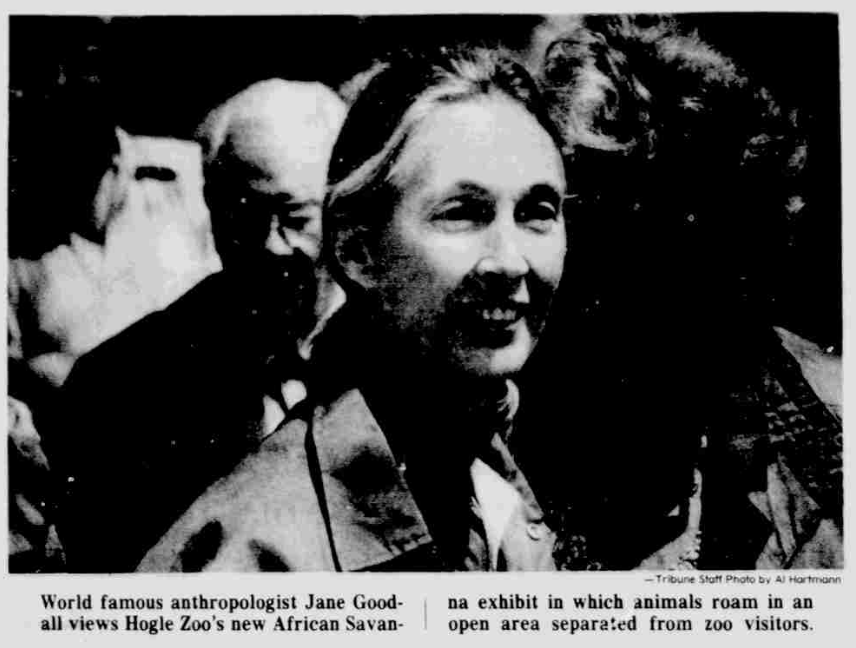
Jane Goodall at the dedication ceremony for the zoo's new African Savanna exhibit on April 29, 1986

While on a book tour for her text The Chimpanzees of Gombe, famed anthropologist Jane Goodall made a stop at Utah's Hogle Zoo to dedicate the zoo's new African Savanna exhibit on April 29, 1986. Joining her for the ribbon cutting ceremony was Utah governor Norman H. Bangerter. In her remarks, Goodall commended the exhibit, noting her approval of the animals' ability to roam in an open space in social groupings. The exhibit was designed by architect Von M. White and construction was completed by Mark G. Garff Construction.

The African Savanna covered one acre of the northwest section of the Zoo, replacing chain-linked yards that once held many species including blackbuck, common eland, sitatunga, and wallaroo. The tiered exhibit featured three habitats for African ungulates and birds. Boma enclosures inspired fencing and a rondavel inspired indoor holding area added to the exhibit's authenticity. The $250,000 exhibit was funded through private donations and membership subscriptions.

The African Savanna was split into three habitats. The Lower Savanna habitat was built as a new exhibit for the Zoo's African antelope, including South Africa's springbok and Thomson's gazelle from East Africa. New species were also added to the collection in the new African Savanna including addra gazelle and waterbuck. Cuvier's gazelle were added in 2002, and the critically endangered addax was added to the exhibit in 2003. The Lower Savanna habitat was visible via an outlook that extended from the path towards the old Giraffe Building as well as an elevated walkway that provided a birds-eye-view of the habitat.

The Upper Savanna was a habitat for plains zebra originally, until 1998 when they were replaced with Grévy's zebra. A gully provided a natural barrier between the guests and the zebras. The pond of this habitat trickled down into a waterfall that extended into the Lower Savanna. A third habitat for smaller antelope was located adjacent to the Sea Lion Pool. This space was later used for red pandas in 2002. Egyptian geese and a flock of helmeted guineafowl had free range between the Lower and Upper Savannah habitats.

On November 9, 1998, Taji and Monty, two male Grévy's zebras arrived at Hogle Zoo from the Sedgwick County Zoo in Kansas. The two zebras occupied the Upper Savannah habitat. Their addition to the zoo's collection was significant, as it was the first time this endangered species had been exhibited in Utah.

On January 26, 2010, Taji was found dead in his barn. The following day, Monty was showing signs of distress. Later that day, it was determined that Monty needed to be humanely euthanized. For months, the zebras' deaths remained a mystery. Since it had snowed the week of their deaths, it was ruled out that any predators or humans had been involved. Both had experienced nosebleeds and blunt force trauma, possibly pointing to a fight between the two males. On March 17, 2010, the zoo announced that the zebras' necropsy had come back inconclusive. To do this day, Taji and Monty's deaths remain one of the biggest unsolved mysteries in the Zoo's history.

After the zebras' death, ostriches made a return to the African Savanna with the addition of three males. They took up residence in the Upper Savannah habitat. When construction on Rocky Shores began in 2010, the ostriches moved to the former cheetah habitat just south of the Giraffe Building along with two Egyptian geese and an elderly springbok. The birds were ultimately moved to the Zoo's new African Savanna exhibit when it opened in 2014.

==== Penguin Cove ====
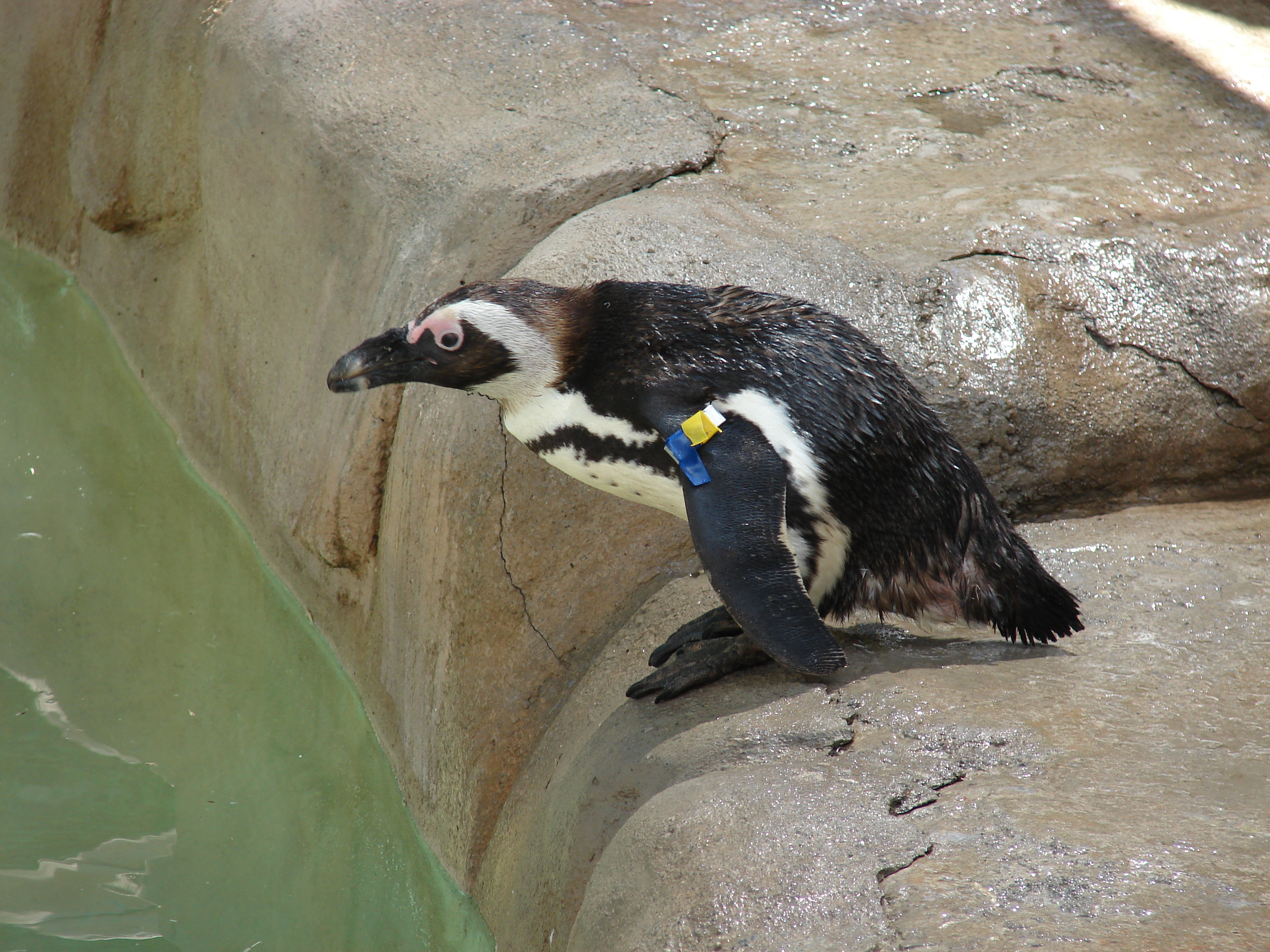
Penguin at Penguin Cove

Hogle Zoo had a long history of exhibiting and breeding African penguins. In 1983, the first penguins arrived at Hogle Zoo. The four penguins were exhibited in a habitat outside of the Small Animal Building. On September 16, 1987, the zoo's first penguin chicks hatched. The same pair would go on to have three more chicks over the next three years. These chicks, however, did not live long and by the end of 1993, only one male from the colony was left.

On March 24, 1993, six African penguins, one male and five females, arrived at the zoo from the Maryland Zoo joining the zoo's lone male. This new colony would go on to produce 11 chicks from 1994 to 2007.

In 1996 the Sea Lion Pool, located in the northwest end of the zoo, was renovated to house the growing penguin colony. The Sea Lion Pool, originally built in 1964, was dedicated to former zoo director Gerald deBary who had died earlier that year from a fatal bite by a puff adder. The exhibit which was once home to harbor seals and California sea lions (albeit the former was later relocated towards the east end of the zoo in an exhibit with a viewing tank), was closed due to costly renovations required to meet standards for marine mammals. The exhibit needed a new filtration system which would have cost $500,000. Instead the exhibit was renovated and turned into Penguin Cove which opened to the public on October 24, 1996. The renovations, which cost $40,000, included a rocky coastline surrounding the existing pool, a nesting beach, and an indoor habitat.

African penguins lived at Penguin Cove until the fall of 2010 when construction began on Rocky Shores. The remaining penguins were relocated to other accredited facilities including Dallas World Aquarium, Little Rock Zoo, and Toronto Zoo. The zoo has not had penguins in their collection since and has no plans for their return.

==== Red pandas ====
On December 6, 2002, Sarah and Ethel, two female red pandas made their debut in a new exhibit near Penguin Cove. The two had arrived the October prior from the Erie Zoo. The outdoor exhibit featured large trees for the red pandas to climb and an indoor habitat for them during Utah's hot summer months.

Red pandas were absent from the Zoo after November 2010 when construction began on Rocky Shores. The species returned in 2018 with the opening of a new exhibit in Asian Highlands.

=== Primate Building ===
In 1966, the Zoo began construction on a new Ape House intended to display all members of the great ape family. Once completed, the $75,000 exhibit was home to the Zoo’s first three chimpanzees which were acquired through donated trading stamps. Also on display were four members of the gibbon family. Rounding out the great ape collection, the Zoo acquired its first ever gorillas and orangutans in 1967. By 1969, the Ape House was already home to six chimpanzees, three orangutans, three gibbons, and two gorillas. The exhibit was famous for its two geodesic domes that were added to the front of the building in 1982 for guereza and ring-tailed lemurs. The cages were made of welded iron rods and were paid for by a $25,000 donation. After being deemed no longer structurally sound, the building was demolished in 2014 and replaced by Creekside, an attraction geared towards children.

==== Gorillas and orangutans ====
In early 1967, Dan Valentine urged the readers of his "Nothing Serious" column in the Salt Lake Tribune to donate their spare change to allow the Zoo to purchase a pair of gorillas. Thousands of donations came in, and in total almost $5,000 was raised. To purchase the more than $8,000 gorillas, the rest of the funds were provided by the Utah Zoological Society. The male and female pair of western lowland gorillas were captured in Cameroon by famed Dutch animal dealer Franciscus van den Brink. The pair originally flew to Paris, France on May 18, 1967, before spending some time in Soest, Netherlands. Their delay to Utah was due to the gorillas becoming sick, however, they eventually began their trip to America. On June 16, 1967, they travelled from Amsterdam to Frankfurt before arriving in San Francisco, California. Then Director, LaMar Farnsworth, met up with the gorillas in San Francisco and joined them on their flight to Salt Lake City on June 17. On June 19, a contest was started in the Salt Lake Tribune to name the gorillas which had only been referred to as “Him” and “Her” in both papers and at the Zoo. Children ages thirteen and under were allowed to submit their name suggestions. The gorillas would make their public debut in the Ape House on June 23, 1967. On July 15, a month later, the gorillas officially received their names. Twenty-five entries had been submitted with the names Dan and Elaine paying homage to the man who spearheaded “Operation Gorilla” and his wife. The twenty-five youngsters who picked the names along with 250 other children who submitted derivatives of Dan, Elaine, or their last name Valentine all received a free, year-long membership to the Zoo. By summer 1968, over 500,000 visitors had come to the Ape House specifically to see the Zoo’s first gorillas. Dan died on July 3, 1975. Elaine, however, was not without a companion for long, as the Zoo acquired Dan II later that month from Six Flags Discovery Kingdom. Before he passed, Dan I successfully mated with Elaine, resulting in the Zoo's first gorilla birth on December 27, 1975. The female gorilla was named Danielle after her late father. Unfortunately, Danielle suffered from brain damage that occurred during Elaine's pregnancy. Danielle was hand-raised by LaMar Farnsworth, but when she was not progressing properly, the zoo director brought her to the UC Davis School of Veterinary Medicine in October 1976 for a diagnosis. She ultimately died in California on November 24, 1976.

Only three days after the gorillas made their public debut, the Zoo received its first Bornean orangutan, a male named Otis. Two months later Otis would be joined by another male named Jiggs and a female named Maggie. Both Jiggs and Maggie were sourced by the same Dutch animal dealer who had acquired the Zoo’s gorillas. In May 1971, a second female orangutan named Go-Go joined the others in the Ape House. Go-Go was a gift to the United States from the Indonesian government. On December 4, 1974, the Zoo welcomed its first-ever birth of an orangutan. The male was named Rango and was born to father Otis and mother Maggie. Maggie would go on to give birth to three more offspring with Jiggs. These births included another male named Pongo in 1981, and two females born in 1981 and 1984. Kayla, the female born in 1984, is still alive and currently resides at the Cleveland Metroparks Zoo in Ohio. Jiggs also fathered a male offspring in 1990 named J.J. with another mate named Vickie.

In 1984, the Zoo moved their gorillas and orangutans into the newly built Great Apes exhibit. The new exhibit allowed the animals access to naturalistic outdoor habitats for the first time. Subsequently, the Ape House was transitioned into the Primate Building.

==== Other primates ====
Members of the gibbon family called the exhibit home from its opening until its closure in 2014. In 1969, a pair of young siamangs went on display in the exhibit. The same year, the Zoo received its first white-handed gibbons. Despite having several male-female pairs, the Zoo did not produce an offspring of the species until 2012. Male Riley and his mate Candy were paired together at Utah's Hogle Zoo in 2009. After two stillbirths in 2010 and 2011, Candy finally gave birth to a male named Thai on August 14, 2012. Unfortunately, Candy experienced a prolapsed uterus after the birth. White she was being treated keepers noticed she did not have enough milk to feed the baby. At three-weeks-old, it was then decided that Thai would need to be hand raised. Thai was raised by zoo staff for four months until he was successfully reintroduced to his parents on December 11, 2012. The entire family moved to the Idaho Falls Zoo at Tautphaus Park in 2014, where they still can be seen today.

Both old world monkeys and new world monkeys were exhibited in the building. The Zoo added a breeding pair of Hamadryas baboons to the exhibit in 1970. Eleven members of the species were born in the Primate Building. The Zoo’s four remaining baboons were transferred to the Prospect Park Zoo in June 1993. In December 1984, the Zoo received a sibling pair of mandrills from the ABQ BioPark Zoo. The exhibit would be home to three more mandrills until the species was ultimately phased out in 2011. In May 1983, the Zoo received a breeding group of five red-tailed monkeys. From 1984 until 1998, the group produced twelve offspring. In May 1990, the Zoo received a pair of De Brazza's monkeys. The exhibit was also home to the Zoo’s spider monkeys, black howler monkeys, and Bolivian gray titis before they were moved to Primate Forest.

Finally, the Primate Building was home to a collection of lemurs. In 1972, the exhibit displayed a pair of ring-tailed lemurs named Sampson and Delilah from the Denver Zoo for the first time. The species was a staple of the Primate Building until its closure in 2014 when the last individuals, two males named Buddy and Keamey, were transferred to Omaha's Henry Doorly Zoo and Aquarium. In 1985, the Zoo received both black-and-white ruffed lemurs as well as red ruffed lemurs. Both species were successfully bred at the Zoo with the former being part of a reintroduction program in Madagascar. Other species of lemurs that were housed in the Primate Building included mongoose lemur, crowned lemur, and white-headed lemur.

=== Giraffe Building ===
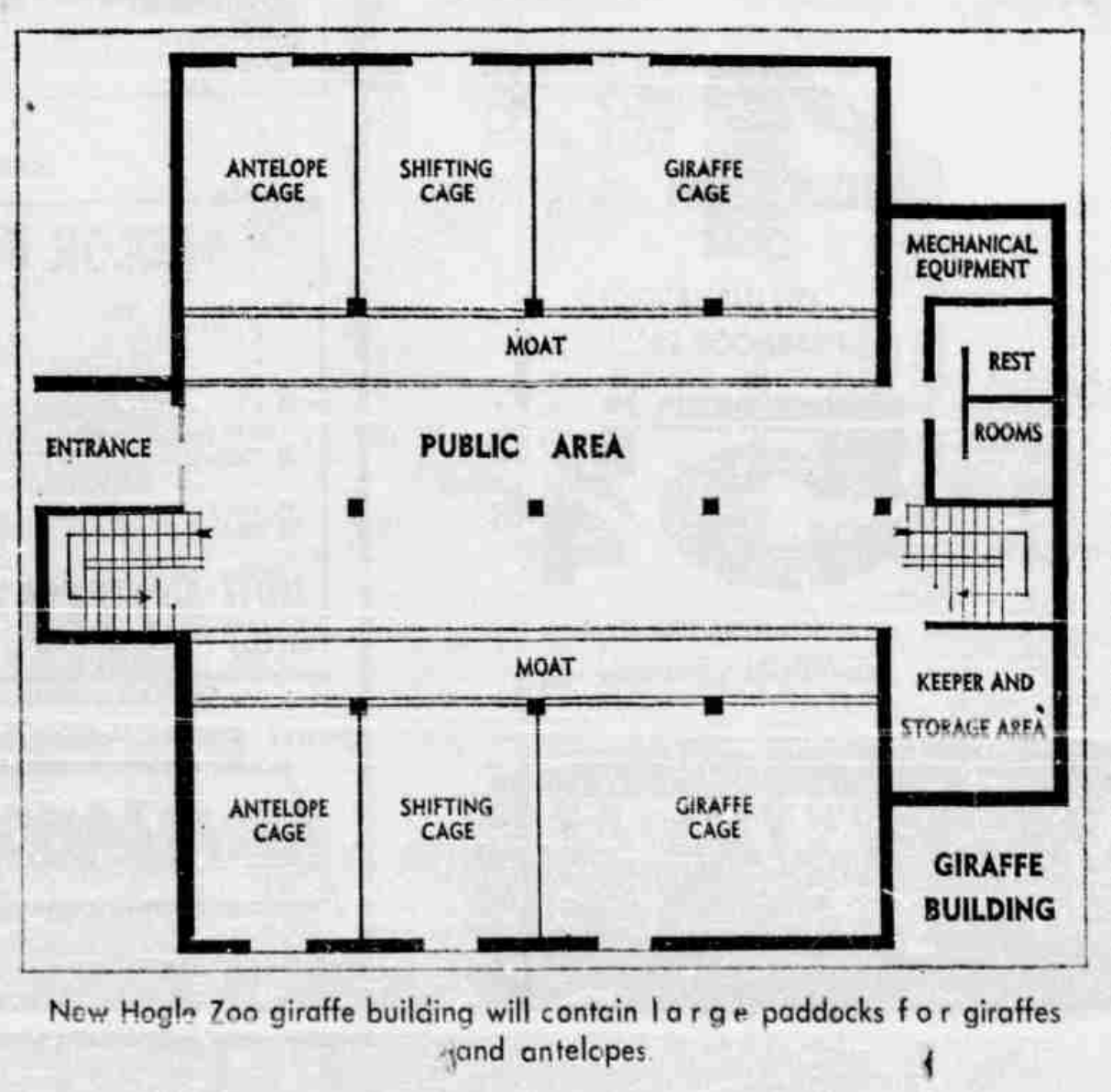
The original 1968 scheme for the two-story Giraffe House designed by Bruce J. McDermott and Associates included space for African antelope and bird species.

In 1969 the two-story Giraffe Building was constructed. The giraffe building was known as the up-and-down house and formerly housed antelopes and birds as well as giraffes, but it was not safe. In the early 1990s, two giraffes were euthanized after breaking legs on slippery floors. In 1994, the USDA cited the zoo because it failed to maintain the structure in good repair. The zoo was also cited in 1994 after failing to correct previously identified violations of peeling paint that could be ingested by the giraffes. In 2002, Sandile, a 7-year-old male reticulated giraffe, died after getting his neck stuck in a fence. In 2004, Ruth, a 26-year-old female reticulated giraffe, was euthanized after complications of a fractured leg. The zoo could not identify whether the broken leg was related to the building. Several giraffes died at Hogle Zoo, however, not all were building related. The zoo paid in all $50,000 to ensure that the Giraffe Building was USDA approved. After the African Savanna was opened in 2014, all of the zoo's giraffes were moved to a new state-of-art giraffe house. The old Giraffe Building was turned into the zoo's Maintenance Building, and it no longer houses animals.

=== Feline Building ===
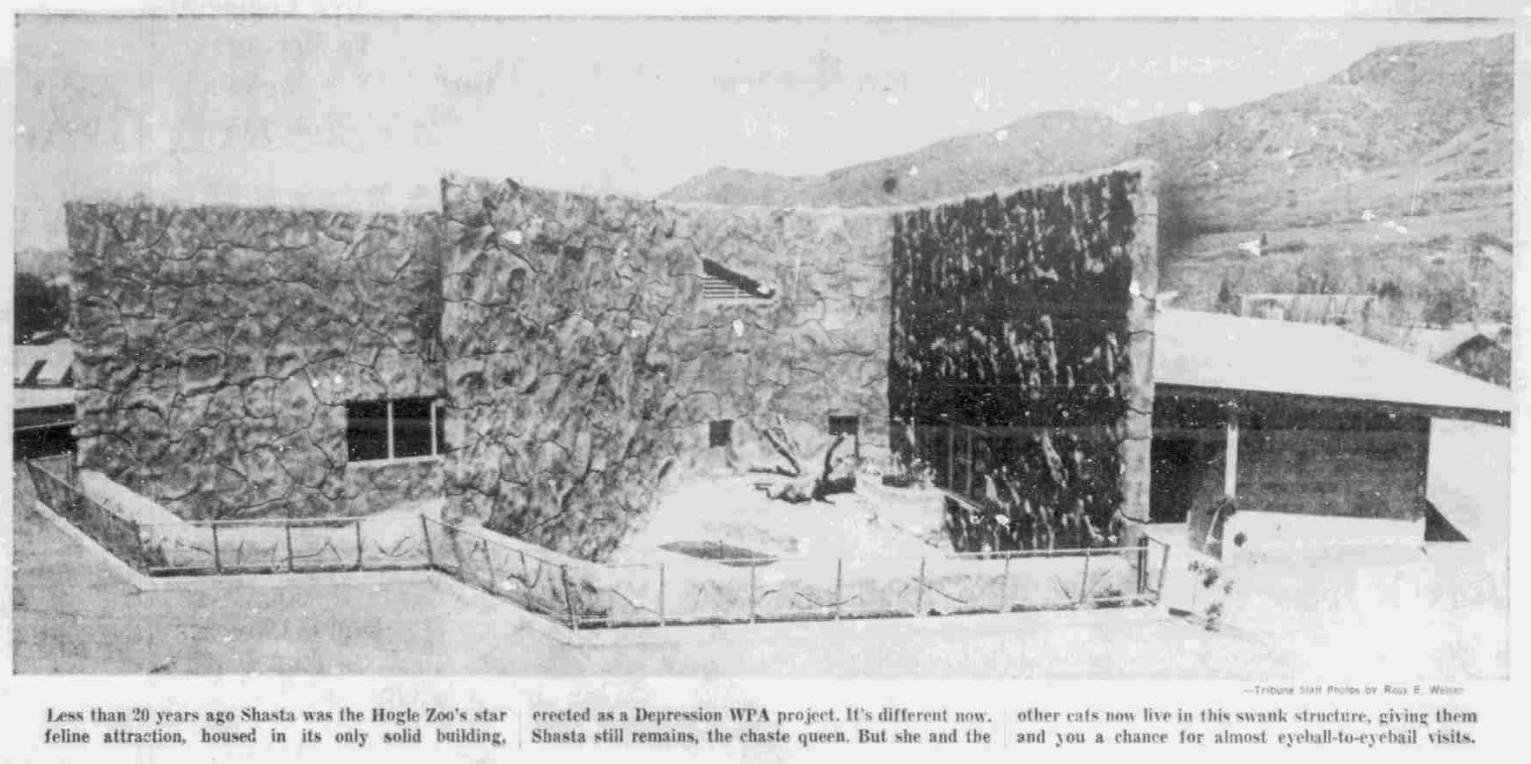
Hogle Zoo's Feline Building in 1971, featuring two outdoor exhibits for lions and tigers.

In 1968, 4,750 Salt Lake City voters approved a $1 million bond for a major development project at Hogle Zoo. Then zoo director LaMar Farnsworth said that this was, "the greatest thing that has happened to the zoo". The bond would be used to help fund a transformation of the undeveloped southwest portion of the zoo. The first phase of the project included a new Feline Building, which would replace dated exhibits for the zoo's cat collection in the old Lion House.

The $340,000 Feline Building opened to guests on April 4, 1970. The exhibit consisted of five large concrete cages for big cats including Amur tiger, Bengal tiger, African lion, African leopard, snow leopard, and jaguar over the years. Large garage doors were open during the summer to let fresh air into the exhibit. The exhibit also featured two outdoor habitats for the lions and tigers. A series of smaller cages were home to an impressive collection of small cats including jaguarundi, ocelot, margay, Geoffrey's cat, clouded leopard, Asian golden cat, caracal, serval, sand cat, and African wildcat over the years. The most famous of the residents inside the Feline Building, however, was Shasta the liger who was born at the zoo in 1948. Shasta resided in the Feline Building for two years until her death in 1972. The Feline Building also included restrooms, educational displays, and a maternity cage for a mother cat and her offspring.

In 1995, the Feline Building began its first major renovation since its opening. The renovations, totaling $1,400 when completed in 1996, included fabricated trees, rock work, recirculating water, as well as murals depicting the species' natural habitats.

The Feline Building closed in 2005, when construction started on the Asian Highlands. The skeleton of the Feline Building was retained, and now serves as the indoor holding areas for the Asian Highlands residents. The sand cats and wildcats were relocated in the Small Animal building and the ocelot was relocated towards Discoveryland in 2005 and remained there until 2012 shortly before construction began on African Savanna.

After the deaths of lion Flip in 2003 and elderly lioness Abby in December 2006, nearly six months after the opening of Asian Highlands, lions were not in the zoo's collection again until the first phase of African Savanna was completed on May 2, 2014.

=== Hippo Building ===
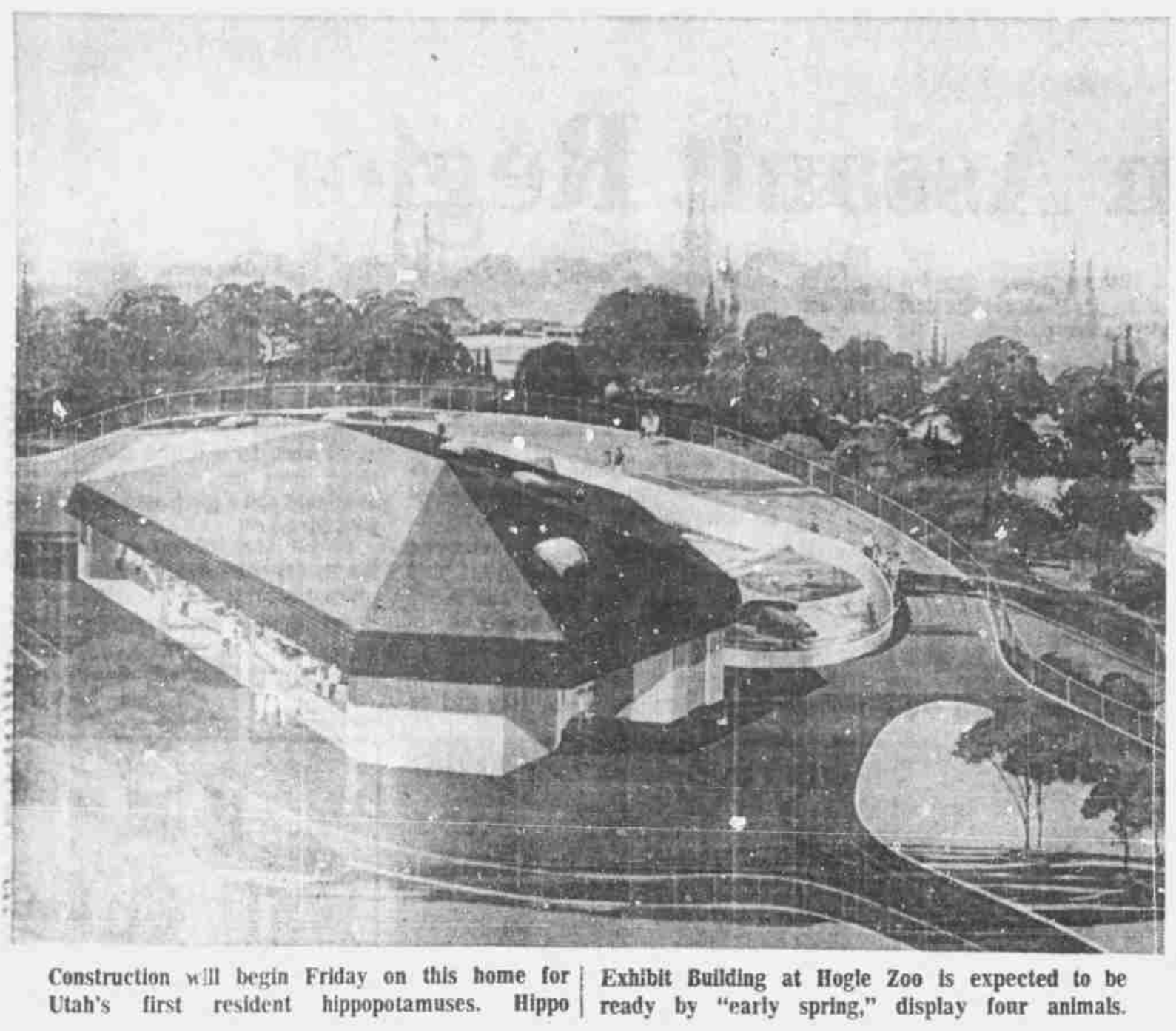
A 1973 rendering of the Hippo Building on the site where the Conservation Carousel is located today.

In 1973, zoo officials announced that Salt Lake County had pledged $130,000 for a new exhibit that would display the first hippos seen in Utah. A year later, the Hippo Building, or "Hippodrome", opened in 1974. The exhibit, which was designed by architect firm McDermott and Associates, included a 90 by 64 foot indoor building as well as a 90 by 40 foot outdoor habitat for both hippopotamus and pygmy hippopotamus. The construction, which cost a total of $235,000, consisted of six pools for the hippos, the largest of which was 30,000 gallons. A bridge connecting the north side of the zoo to the Hippo Building provided improved circulation for zoo guests.

On March 28, 1974, the first residents of the exhibits, pygmy hippo pair Cleo and Brutus, arrived from West Africa. The pair produced three calves while living in the Hippo Building including a male in 1982, another male in 1983, and finally, a female in 1984. Brutus died at Hogle Zoo on April 10, 1997, while Cleo was transferred to Omaha's Henry Doorly Zoo on a breeding recommendation on October 27, 2001. Cleo died two days later.

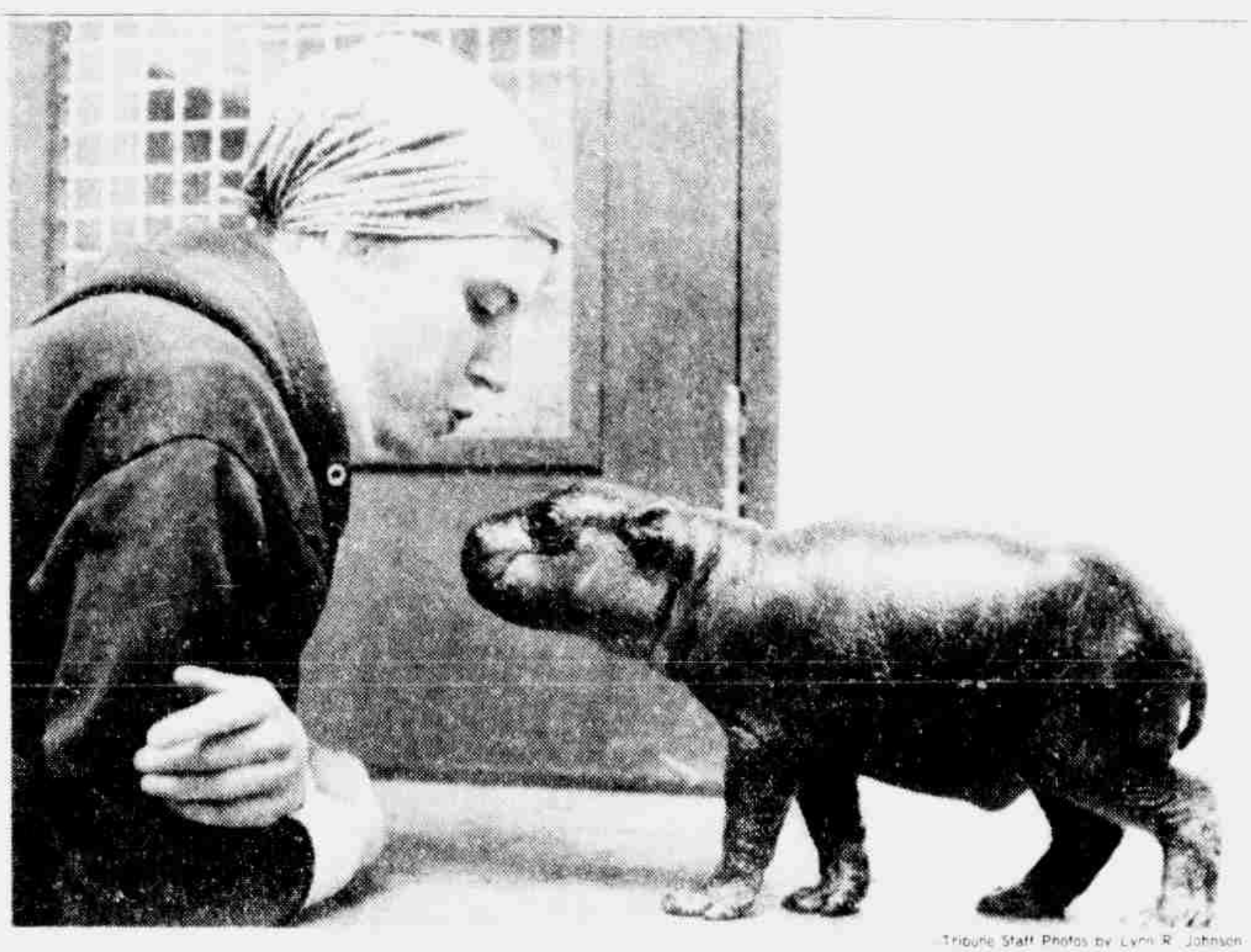
Winston, the first pygmy hippopotamus born at Hogle Zoo on February 14, 1982, is seen with his caretaker Daisy Garcia.

On June 9, 1974, Tuff-Enuff, a male river hippo who was later named Moe, arrived from the Calgary Zoo. His mate Henrietta, arrived a day later from the Denver Zoo. The pair had two unsuccessful births in 1978 and 1979. Both calves died the day of their birth. Henrietta died on February 15, 1980, at the zoo. Moe was transferred to the Albuquerque Biological Park on April 11, 2005, where he lived until his death on November 8, 2025. Moe moved to join a female hippo, Karen, on a breeding recommendation. Moe fathered four healthy calves after moving to the ABQ BioPark, with the last calf being born a month before his death.

The Hippo Building also provided additional exhibit space for the zoo's African penguins as well as summer exhibits for the zoo's crocodiles and alligators. Also on display, in the exhibit was the zoo's famous "Museum of Human Stupidity" which featured objects from guests that had been found in animal exhibits throughout the zoo.

The Hippo Building was replaced by the Conservation Carousel when Oasis Plaza opened in 2008.

=== Animal Giants Complex ===
In 1981, for the Hogle Zoo's fiftieth anniversary, the Animal Giants Complex was built. The exhibit was built to house the zoo's elephants, African elephants named Hy-Dari and Twiggy, Indian elephants Kali, Toni, and Toka, and the zoo's white rhinos, Princess and George. Naturalistic outdoor enclosures were not only built for the zoo's pachyderms but for ostriches and tortoises too. The Animal Giants Complex was renovated for Elephant Encounter which opened in 2005.

Asian elephants had not been at Hogle Zoo since Kali's death on March 8, 2004.

=== Central Zone ===
Central Zone was located in where the current Meerkat Manor and Lion Hill exhibits are today. Central Zone was once home to the zoo's original elephant house known as the Main Building which was dedicated on July 31, 1931. The Main Building was not only home to the zoo's elephants, including Princess Alice, but also provided winter housing for a majority of the zoo's collection in its early years. On August 14, 1932, a relief of Princess Alice was unveiled on the front of the building which was donated by local sculptor J.R. Fox. In its lifetime, the Main Building underwent many renovations, starting in 1945, to accommodate better living conditions for animals. By the late 1970s, most animals in the Main Building had moved to new exhibits within the zoo. It was then that the east side of the complex was renovated into an auditorium. As part of the Primate Forest exhibit, the west side of the building was reconfigured into two indoor exhibits for primates in the late 1990s.

Central Zone was also home to an exhibit for the zoo's Bactrian camel herd. By the early 2000s, the zoo had a breeding herd with at least one calf born every year. The zoo phased out their camels in 2012 after Gobi, an arthritic male, was euthanized and his female companion Mabel was then sent to the San Diego Zoo. This allowed the zoo to start construction on the African Savanna exhibit. Bactrian camels eventually returned to the zoo's collection in 2024 when Elephant Encounter became High Desert Oasis.

=== Discovery Land ===
The first phases of Discovery Land opened in 1988 featuring a newly planted forest, duck pond, and fort for children to play in. A couple months after its opening, the George S. and Dolores Dore Eccles Foundation granted Hogle Zoo $100,000 as a matching grant. Combined with $700,000 from the Utah Legislature, the zoo had enough resources to fund new phases for the Discovery Land project. The new exhibits, which would transform the eastern end of the zoo, would display animals in naturalistic settings. North American animals were to be displayed in habitats representing woodlands, wetlands, and deserts. Under the direction of zoo director LaMar Farnsworth, the exhibits would cater to the zoo's younger demographic and include a new playground. In 1990, Woodland Edge, Knoll and Burrow, and the Marsh were added to Discovery Land with Desert Canyon being added in 1992.

==== Woodland Edge ====
Woodland Edge was made up of four habitats that housed a series of raptors and cats over the years. Species exhibited in Woodland Edge included Canada lynx, bobcat, bald eagle, rough-legged hawk, and ferruginous hawk.

In order for construction on Rocky Shores to begin, some of the animals from the construction zone had to be moved to Discoveryland. The four exhibits in Woodland Edge were renovated into two larger habitats to accommodate the zoo's two mountain lions Kota and Echo as well as the zoo's four Chacoan peccaries. New exhibits were built for the bald eagles and bobcat who were occupying Woodland Edge on the zoo's South Rim.

==== Knoll and Burrow ====
Knoll and Burrow was completed alongside Woodland Edge. The two exhibits cost $275,000. The innovative exhibit resembled a cave on the American prairie. On the outside, visitors could see exhibits for common North American including a colony of black-tailed prairie dogs, yellow-bellied marmot, North American porcupine, striped skunk and rabbit.

The exhibits were also used to house more rare species. Utah's Hogle Zoo was the only facility to exhibit the rare Utah prairie dogs. In 1900 it was estimated that there were 95,000 Utah prairie dogs. In 2004, the Utah Department of Wildlife Resources estimated that there were only 4,022 Utah prairie dogs left. Their decline has been largely impacted by habitat loss. Hogle Zoo was working with government agencies in helping to preserve the endangered species.

In the early 2000s, Hogle Zoo participated in the Species Survival Plan for black-footed ferrets. The species was thought to be extinct until the discovery of a small population in northeast Wyoming in 1981. Biologists captured the last 18 known wild ferrets in 1986 to start a breeding program. Hogle Zoo served as a holding facility for ferrets that were non-breeding animals and for those that could not be released into the wild. A total of 10 black-footed ferrets called Knoll and Burrow home. Inside the cave were exhibits for a cacomistle, southern flying squirrel, and a colony of over 200 Seba's short-tailed bats. Terrariums in the cave held blind cave fish and giant hairy scorpion. Inside the cave, guests could look through plexiglass to get up-close views of the outside exhibits.

==== Marsh Aviary ====
The Marsh Aviary, was phase four of Discovery Land. Guests could walk out onto a boardwalk over the pond. In the pond, the zoo kept a group of injured American white pelicans, a common gallinule, American wigeons, pintails, mandarin ducks, a great blue heron, a breeding pair of mute swans, a greylag goose, and a snow goose. Also in the pond were other North American duck species. Visitors could pay twenty-five cents to feed the birds.

==== Desert Canyon ====
Desert Canyon was the fifth and final phase of Discovery Land. Large red stone rocks were constructed of fabricated rock, lath and rebar over three concrete and block buildings. A concrete gun was used to build a reddish-color cement-like compound, which was then hand-troweled for the rock-like appearance. The construction of Desert Canyon cost $600,000.

As visitors entered the exhibit they followed a somewhat narrow path to two exhibits for small carnivores. Over time, many species were housed in these habitats including kit fox, ocelot, and white-nosed coati. Two Island foxes were also displayed here in the early 2000s which at the time were only exhibited at Hogle Zoo and the Santa Barbara Zoo. Next visitors saw a collection of smaller exhibits for animals including Merriam's kangaroo rat and an aquarium which housed native Utah fish species June sucker and Bonneville cutthroat trout (although by 2012, shortly before demolition for African Savanna, the native Utah Lake fish were since replaced with bluegills and black crappies). Desert Canyon featured a recreated Anasazi cliff dwelling which provided views to a small mesa for angora goat and Navajo sheep.

Other small glass exhibits featured an array of species over the exhibit's timeline including common collared lizard, Harris's antelope squirrel, white-tailed antelope squirrel, rock squirrel, nine-banded armadillo, southern three-banded armadillo, screech owl, long-eared owl, American kestrel, ring-necked pheasant, Bullock's oriole, and raven.

Desert Canyon also featured a building for the education department's animal ambassadors and a small amphitheater where animal programs were held.

==== Relocation ====
Discovery Land closed in 2012 in anticipation of the new African Savanna. Before construction started, several of Discoveryland's animals were relocated to other areas of the park. An old angora goat and the Navajo sheep moved into the old desert bighorn sheep exhibit on South Rim. Tukut the bobcat and bald eagles Sam and Betsy moved to new exhibits on South Rim as well. The cacomistle and Seba's short-tailed bat's relocated to the Small Animal Building. Hogle Zoo would also pause continued care for the cougars, wolf spiders and gray foxes until 2024, when Discovery Land reopened under the new name Wild Utah as the definitive, public train-loop exhibit, complete with a new Woodland Edge where the plains bison habitat was.

=== Elephant Encounter ===
The push for a new elephant habitat was issued by the Association of Zoos and Aquariums' new 2001 guidelines for elephant care. While many AZA zoos opted to relocate their elephants, Hogle Zoo already had plans for a new facility. In 2003, Salt Lake County voters approved Proposition #1, a bond that allotted Hogle Zoo $10.2 million to redo the Zoo's elephant and feline exhibits. The following year, construction began on the $5.5 million Elephant Encounter, an exhibit that would increase the elephant's habitat by 400 percent. The exhibit opened in June 2005, completing the Zoo's largest major animal exhibit in 25 years. The new home featured three female African bush elephants Hi-Dari, Christie, and Misha, as well as southern white rhinoceros half-siblings Princess and George. The exhibit received praise from the president of AZA at the time, Bill Foster, who noted that "Hogle Zoo is leading. They are ahead of the curve. (Hogle) Zoo will be known globally for the advancement that it's making now".

Elephant Encounter featured three natural outdoor exhibits. The first habitat was a large Serengeti inspired yard with a swimming channel that was 10.5 feet deep and held over 110,000 gallons of water. A second "working yard" allowed guests to see how zookeepers train and care for the large mammals. This habitat also featured overhead heaters and heated concrete floors to ensure the elephants were comfortable in winter months. Guests viewed this habitat from the African Lodge, a 2,600 square foot open-air African styled structure, constructed of wood and thatch materials. The Convergys Corporation pledged $200,000 to become the title sponsor of the structure. A kopje replica allowed guests to come face-to-face with the Zoo's rhinos in a third habitat.

Starting in 2006, attempts were made by a team of German veterinary scientists from the Leibniz Institute for Zoo and Wildlife Research in Berlin to artificially inseminate female elephant Christie. The team used samples from a male elephant named Jackson at the Pittsburgh Zoo. On the third attempt, Christie became pregnant. After a 22-month-long gestation, Christie gave birth to a healthy 251-pound female calf on August 10, 2009. The calf was named Zuri meaning "beautiful" in the Swahili language.

==== Pushback ====
In 2020, the animal activist group In Defense of Animals added Hogle Zoo onto their list of "10 Worst Zoos for Elephants". The group called upon Utah's harsh winter climate and the Zoo's unnatural herd dynamics. With the deaths of Misha in 2008 and Hi-Dari in 2015, the Zoo's herd was down to just Christie and her daughter Zuri. Current AZA regulations mandate that herd sizes should be no less than three. In 2020, a Hogle Zoo spokesperson assured that the zoo is "working closely" with the AZA and Species Survival Plan "to increase the size of our herd, but that takes time. Our current master plan calls for a greater investment in elephants, with bigger barn, additional yards, and large walking paths. We are committed to the species."

==== End to elephant program ====
In May 2023, Hogle Zoo officials announced a permanent end to their elephant program. After caring for elephants for over a century, the Zoo decided that the best plan for their elephants, Christie and Zuri, would be to relocate them to another accredited facility. The plan came after a comprehensive animal-driven evaluation that focused on giving the elephants the opportunity to live in a more behaviorally natural environment and have the chance to breed.

The Zoo's chief executive officer Doug Lund was quoted as saying that the zoo's leadership had "talked to many professionals, consultants, community members, and our staff as we carefully assessed what is best for all our animals, including elephants Christie and Zuri. The ultimate choice to move Christie and Zuri is to provide them both the best chance to have a calf in the important social dynamic of a multigenerational herd". In October 2023, Christie and Zuri were ultimately moved to the Kansas City Zoo & Aquarium in Missouri where they were slowly introduced to a herd of seven elephants including six females and one male.

The exhibit has since been rethemed as High Desert Oasis featuring bachelor groups of Hartmann's mountain zebras and Przewalski's horses as well as a pair of Bactrian camels and longtime resident southern white rhinoceros, Princess.

== Temporary exhibitions ==
=== Tropical Gardens ===
Tropical Gardens was a 3,300-square-foot temperature-controlled greenhouse built in 1995 that housed several temporary exhibits at Hogle Zoo. The 40-by-80-foot glass enclosure was manufactured in New York. The exhibit replaced exhibits for otters and pheasants and ultimately cost $430,000. Tropical Gardens' first exhibit was Butterfly World which opened on June 10, 1995. The exhibit featured hundreds of butterflies representing 21 species.

In 1999, Jack, the Komodo dragon debuted in Tropical Gardens. On loan from Zoo Miami, Jack was over seven feet long and 150 pounds.

On June 19, 2000, Baringa and her son Bundaleer, two koalas on loan from the San Diego Zoo made their debut in a new exhibit Wonders from Down Under. The two koalas traveled from the Salt Lake City airport to the zoo in a limousine. The celebrity status didn't stop there for the koalas. Eucalyptus was flown in from Florida twice weekly to feed the animals while they were on exhibit through October 8, 2000. Wonders from Down Under also featured laughing kookaburras and stick insects.

Butterflies returned to Tropical Gardens in 2001.

Possibly the most popular exhibit in Tropical Gardens was Outback Adventure which ran in the summer months for three years from 2002 through 2004. The exhibit featured around 350 free-flight birds from Oceania including budgerigar, cockatiel, eastern rosella, Papuan eclectus, salmon-crested cockatoo, and zebra finch. The exhibit, which debuted on May 4, 2002, had a $1 entry fee. For an extra $1, guests could purchase a stick with food for the birds to come and feed from. Outback Adventure also featured blue-tongued skink, bearded dragon, and White's tree frog.

Butterflies returned in 2005 and 2006.

On May 5, 2007, the zoo debuted Ghost of the Bayou, an exhibit featuring Antoine, an all white alligator. The 9-foot and 220-pond alligator got his coloring from a genetic mutation called leucism. Antoine was one of 18 white alligators found in the wild in a nest outside of New Orleans in 1987. Because of their unique pigmentation, their chances of survival were low and were therefore taken to the Audubon Zoo where Antoine was on loan from. The rest of the exhibit featured other animals from America's wetlands including baby American alligators, cottonmouth, spotted salamander, and American bullfrog. The exhibit's popularity allowed it to return with Antoine in 2008.

2009 saw the opening of Madagascar! and the first time fossas, Madagascar's largest carnivore were seen in Utah. The exhibit featured two predators as well as lesser hedgehog tenrec, Madagascar tree boa, Madagascar hissing cockroach, and radiated tortoise.

The final exhibit to debut in Tropical Gardens was 2010s Nature's Nightmares featuring "scary" animals with important roles in their ecosystems. The stars of the exhibit were two king vultures. A colony of fifty free-flying straw-colored fruit bats from the Milwaukee County Zoo roosted above guests' heads. Terrariums held emperor scorpion Vietnamese centipede, dung beetle, Goliath bird-eating spider, leeches, and red-bellied piranha. Other species within the exhibit were Norway rat and striped skunk. The exhibit returned in 2011 when it was renamed Living Links.

From 1995 to 2011, Tropical Gardens was home to a number of some of the zoo's most popular exhibits and animals. The exhibit permanently closed in September 2011 when construction began on the Beastro, the zoo's main restaurant. Many of the temporary exhibits' supplementary animals stayed in the zoo's collection and were housed in the Small Animal Building including the colony of straw-colored fruit bats.

=== Summer exhibits ===
During the summer, a number of special temporary exhibitions have been hosted at Hogle Zoo. These have ranged from animatronic dinosaurs to conservation themed art.

Hogle Zoo has featured several animated dinosaur exhibitions. The two most recent being Zoorasic Park (2011) and Zoorasic Park 2 (2015).

In 2013, Creatures of Habitat featured 32 Lego sculptures by Sean Kenny depicting life-size animal scenes including Humboldt penguins, polar bears, and golden lion tamarins.

Fourteen animatronics depicting various supersized bug species were scattered around zoo grounds in Bugszilla during 2017. The exhibit worked to help destigmatize the creepy-crawlies and helped educate guests on the important roles insects play in ecosystems.

Angela Haseltine Pozzi's Washed Ashore came to Hogle Zoo when fifteen of her sea-life sculptures were displayed in 2019. Each sculpture is made of recycled plastic that was collected from United States shorelines. The artwork educates viewers on the importance of recycling and reducing plastic waste as well as the effect pollution has on marine life.

=== World of the Wild Art Show ===
Every year during late winter, the zoo hosts the World of the Wild Art Show. This indoor exhibition shows animal-themed art by various artists.

== Master plan ==
In 1999, the zoo completed the planning of its first major master plan. The plan laid out the blueprints for the Main Entrance (1999), the Wildlife Theater (2004), Elephant Encounter (2005), Asian Highlands (2006), Oasis Plaza (2008), the Animal Hospital (2009), Rocky Shores (2012), the African Savanna (2014), and Creekside Playground (2016). These developments all occurred under zoo director Craig Dinsmore. In 2014, Hogle Zoo hired landscape and architecture firm CLR Design to develop upon the 1999 plan that would see the zoo through 2030. Dinsmore retired in 2017 after serving 20 years as director and CEO of Hogle Zoo. Since 2017, the new zoo directors have steered away from the 2014 Master Plan. Steve Burns' (director 2017-2020) Red Panda Exhibit (2018) and Meerkat Manor (2019) were not a part of the 2014 Master Plan. The current zoo director's, Doug Lund, new Wild Utah exhibit, which is now completed in 2024, is also not a part of the 2014 plan.

In May 2023, it was announced that the zoo is currently developing a new master plan, one that focuses on the animal welfare of gorillas, polar bears, rhinos, and orangutans. While this plan is now outdated, below outlines the major projects identified in the 2014 Master Plan.

=== Great Ape and Primate Forest expansion ===
The Great Ape and Primate Forest expansion will be the biggest project Hogle Zoo still has to undertake. The project will modernize the exhibit space for the zoo's gorillas, orangutans, and smaller primates. As part of the plan, the zoo hopes to exhibit different species together. This would include allowing smaller primate species access to the great ape habitats. This idea of mixed-species exhibits will not only stimulate the animals, but it will give guests an idea of how these animals live in the wild. Primates and apes travel long distances in the wild. Therefore, another plan for the expansion is to have overhead chutes connect several exhibits to allow the animals to move to different exhibit spaces. This feature would give the animals choice as to where they would spend their days. The Great Ape and Primate Forest expansion will also allow better viewing opportunities for the guests.

=== Diversity of Life and Education ===
The Diversity of Life and Education building is planned to replace the zoo's current EdZoocation Station and RendeZoo Room. The facility will not only function as exhibit space for the zoo's small animal collection, but as well as the new dedicated home for the zoo's education department.

=== Flex Exhibit Zone ===
The 2014 master plan calls for the demolition of the current Small Animal Building. In its place, a new building will be erected that will feature seasonal exhibits. The Beastro, the zoo's main restaurant, replaced the zoo's Tropical Gardens exhibit which featured seasonal exhibits from 1995 until 2011.

=== Asian Highlands expansion ===
The Asian Highlands expansion will include minor renovations to the current Asian Highlands exhibit as well as construction on more exhibits above Asian Highlands. The construction will also include improvements to the South Pathway.

== Gallery ==
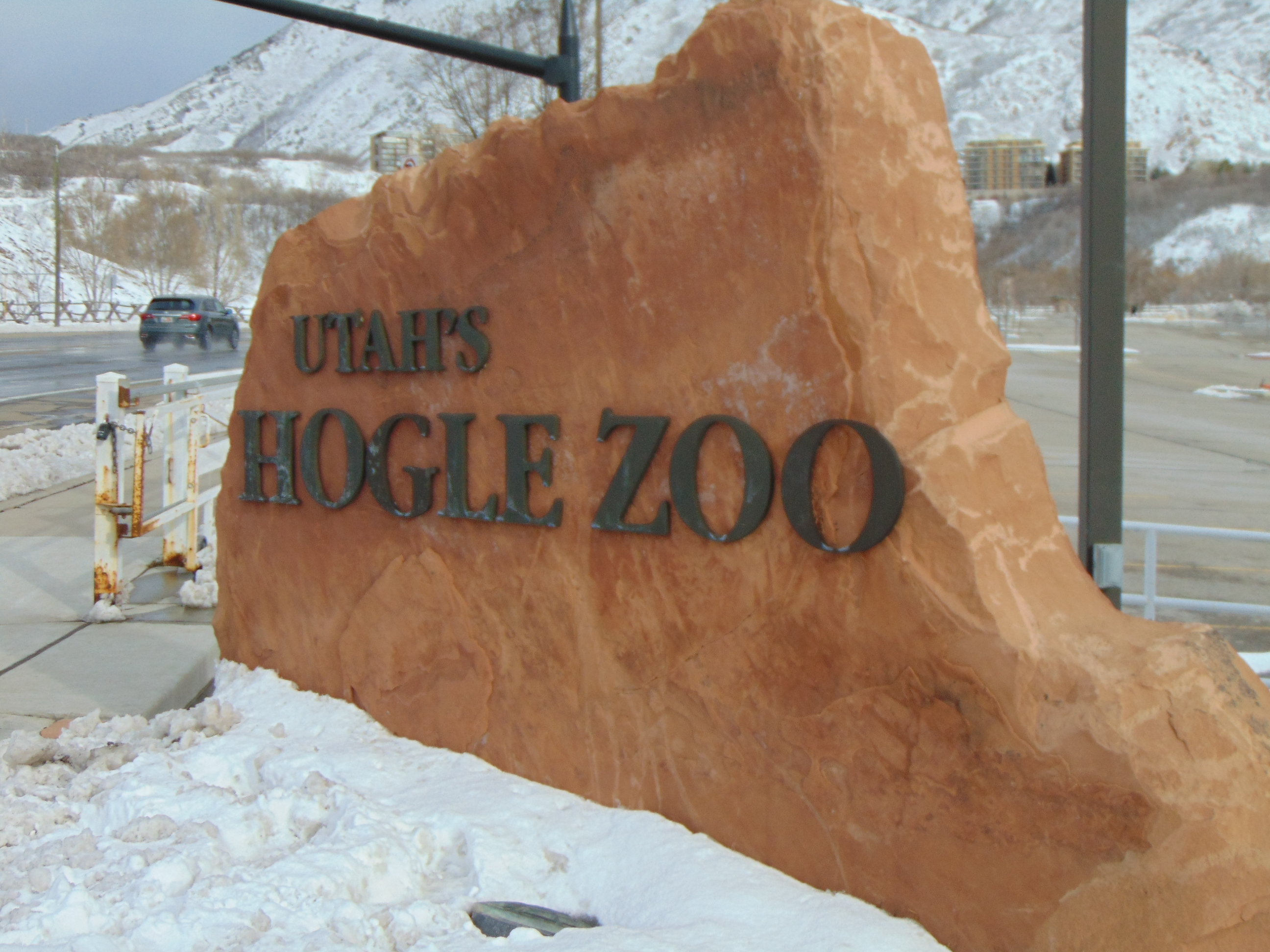
Entrance sign

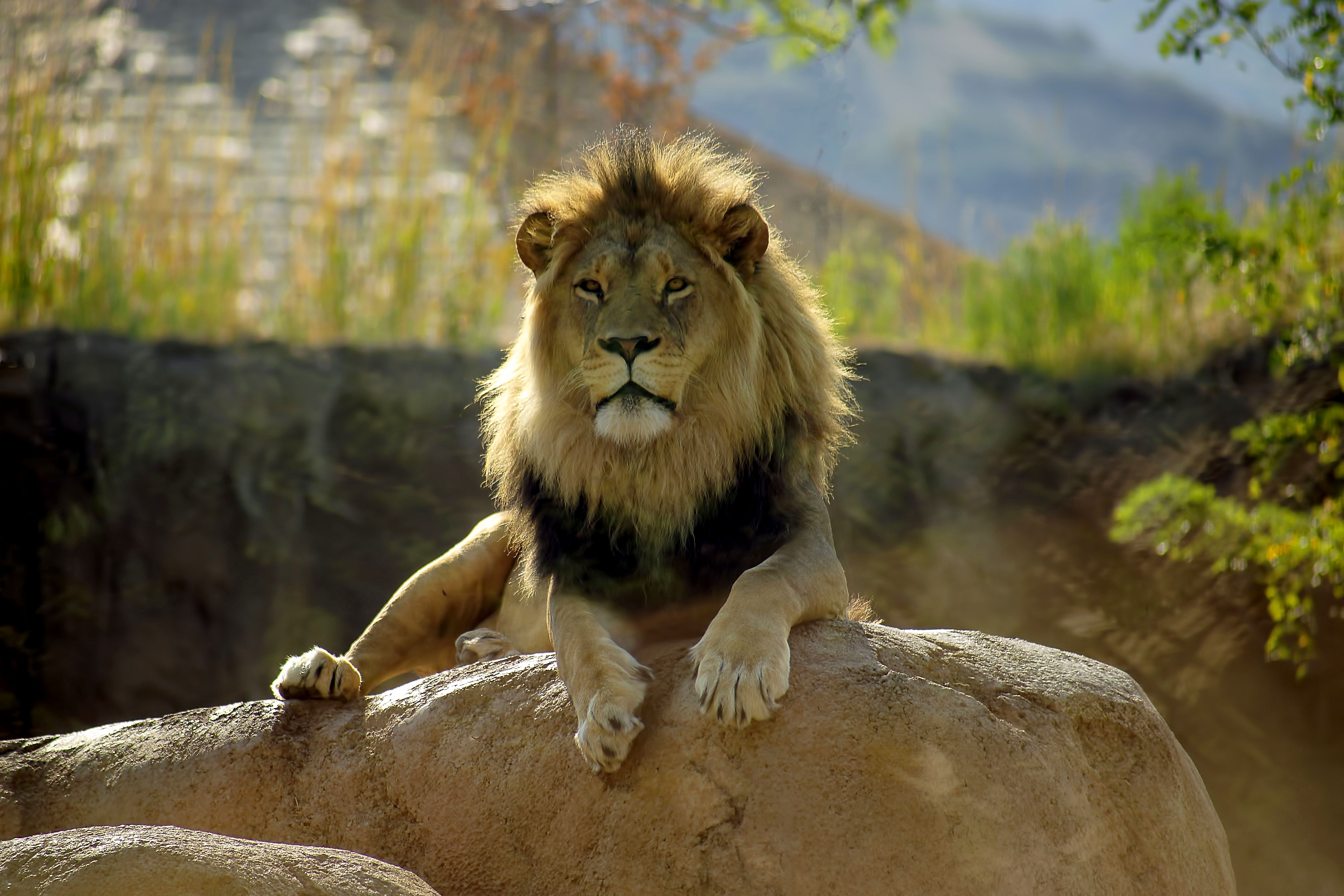
Lion at the zoo

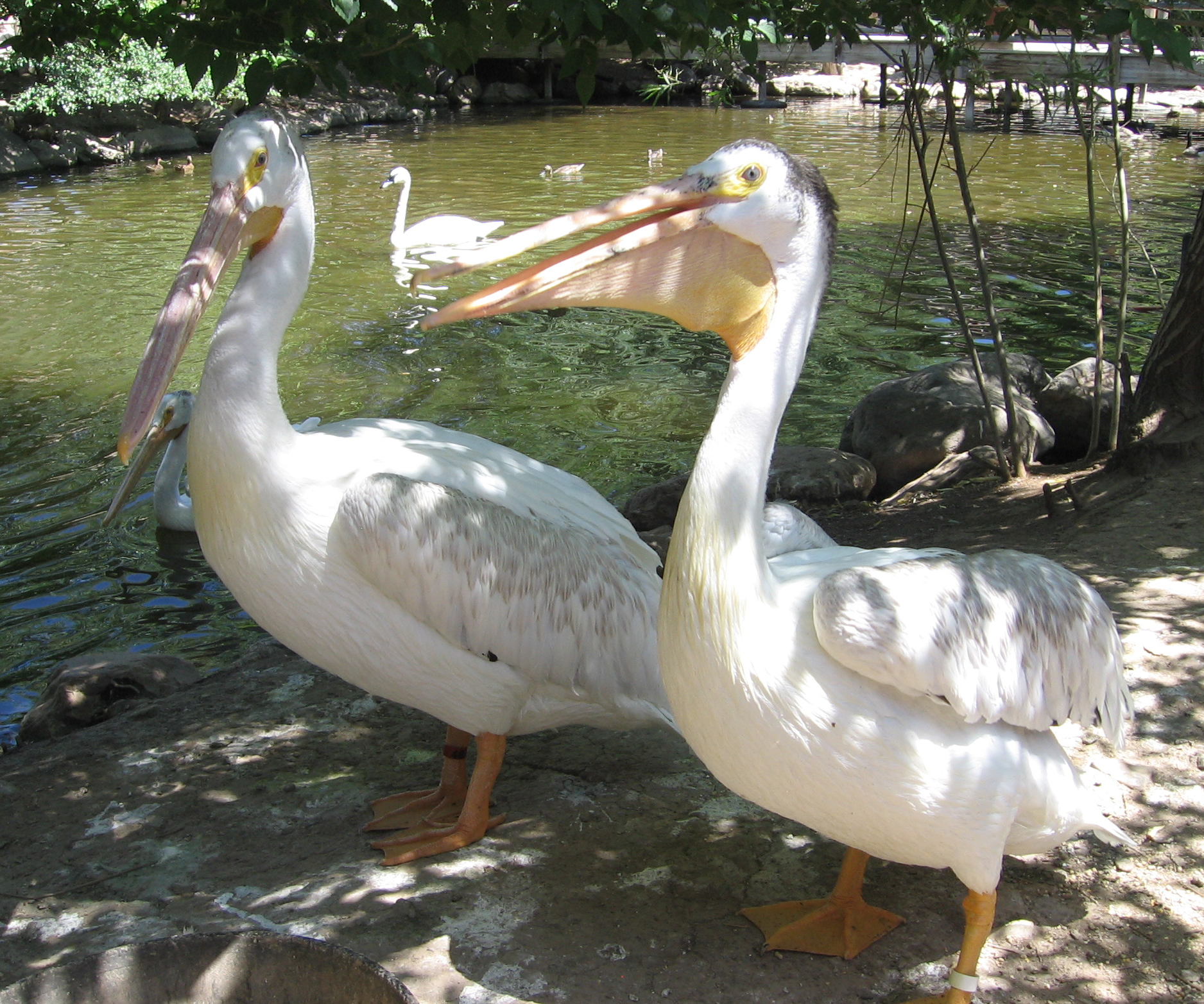
American white pelicans

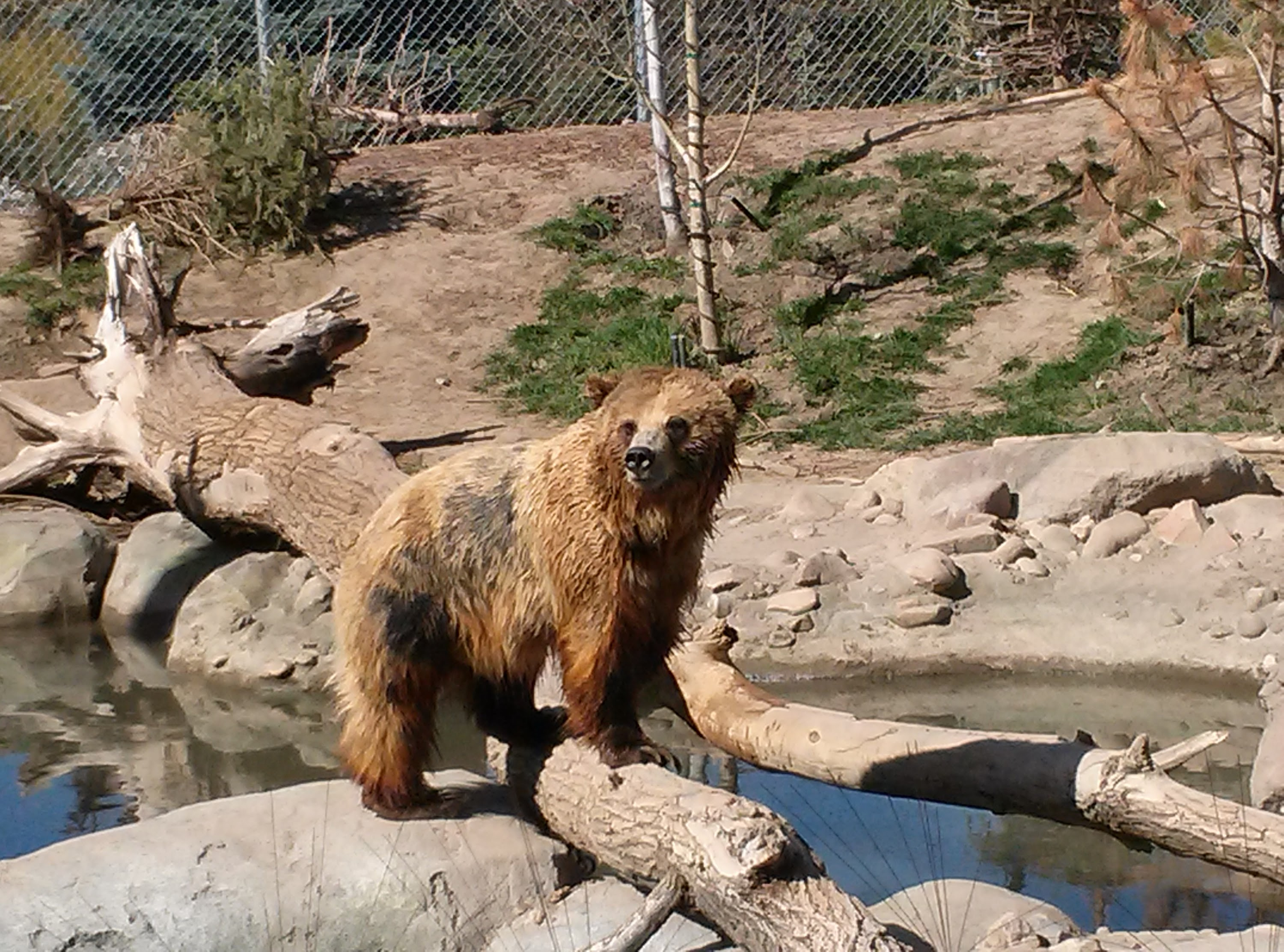
Grizzly bear

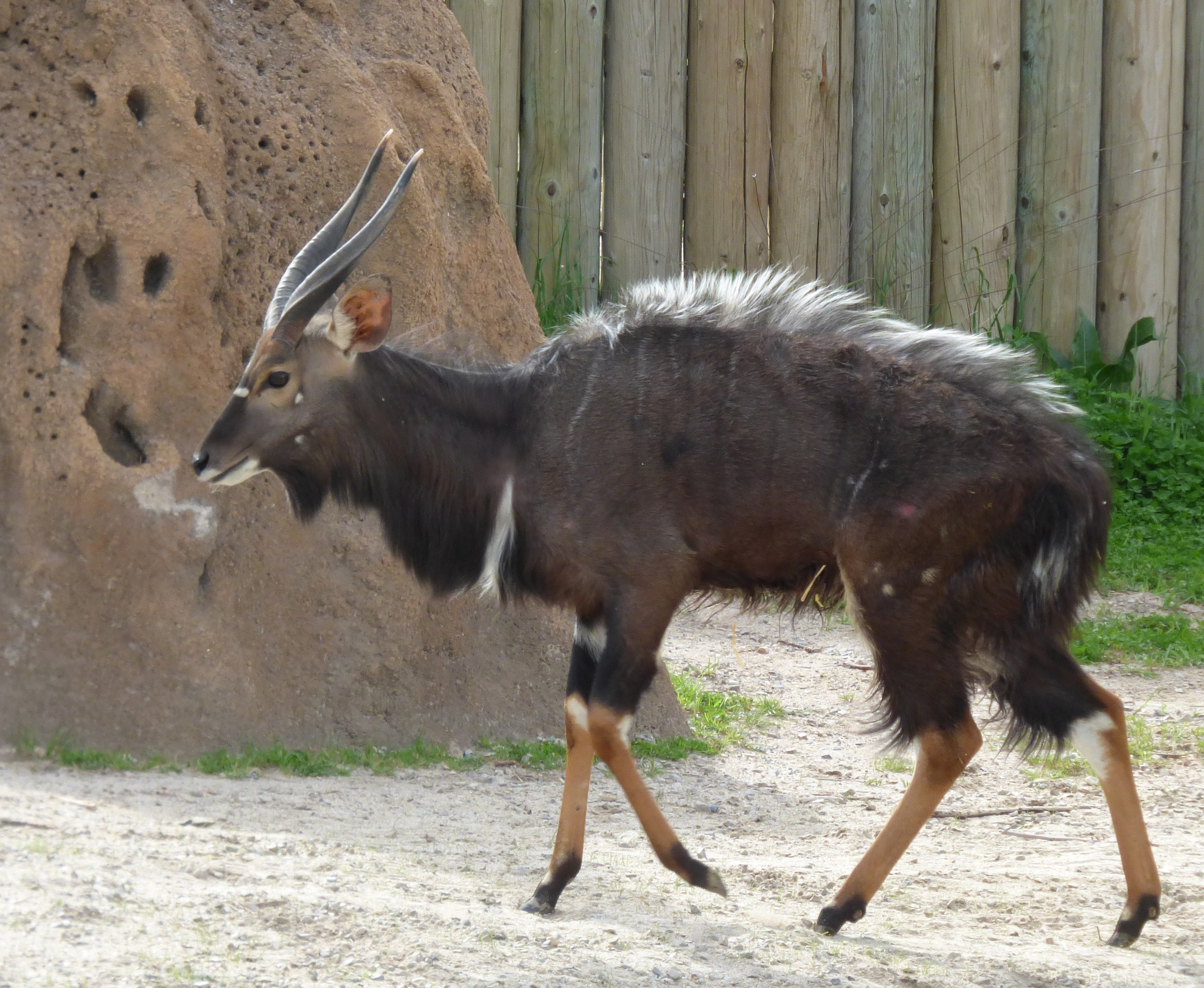
Nyala buck

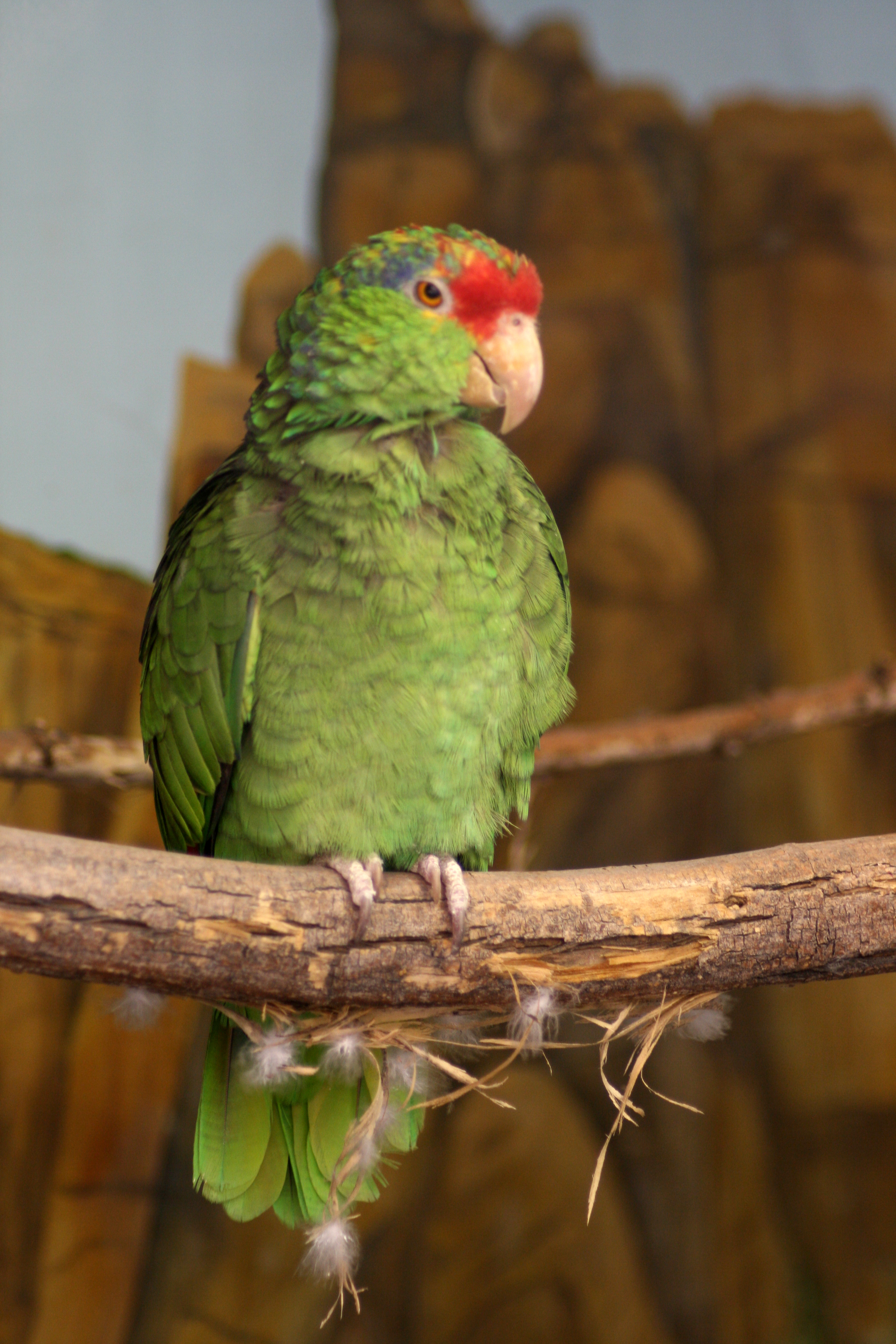
Amazon parrot

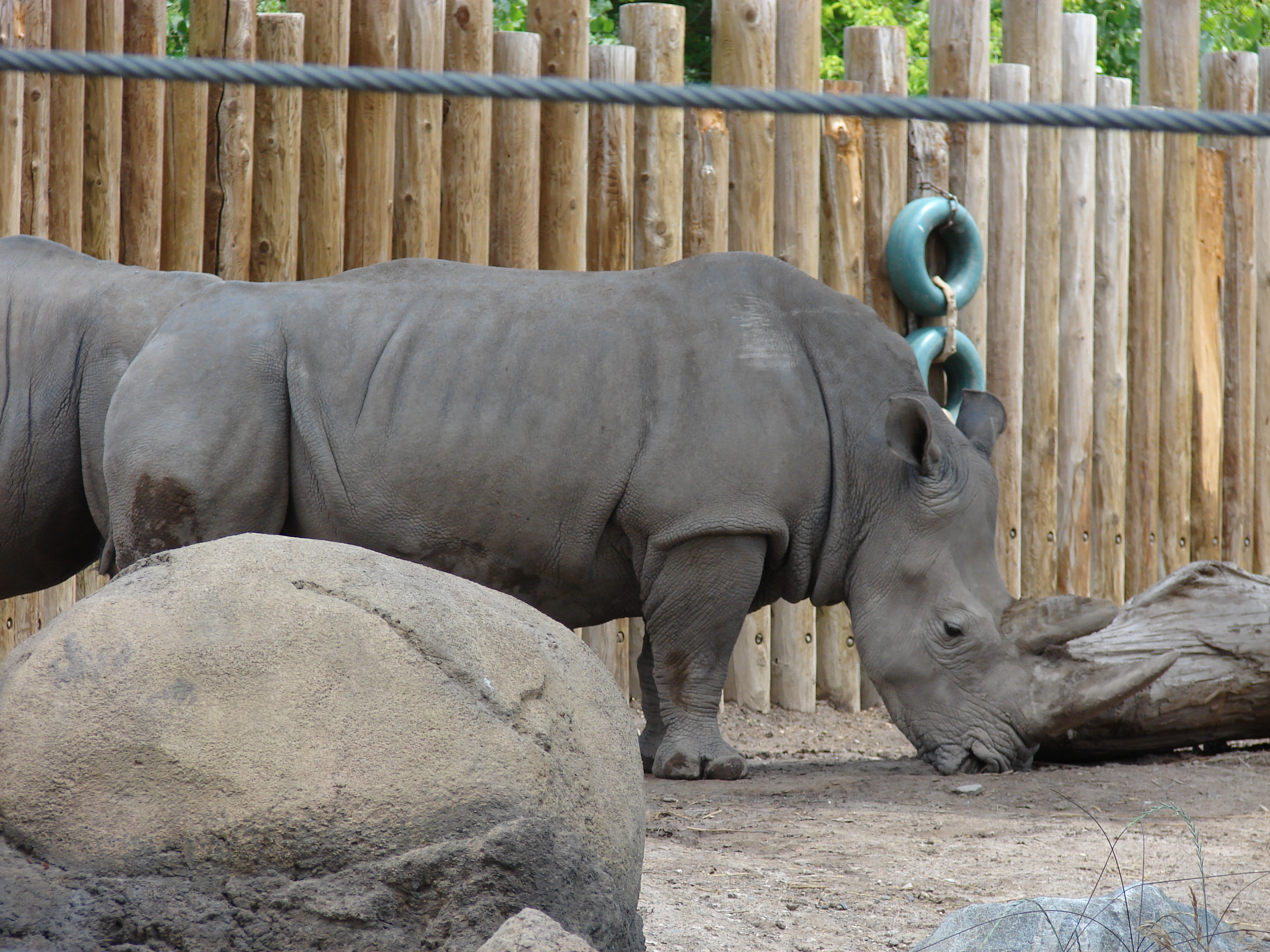
Rhinoceros

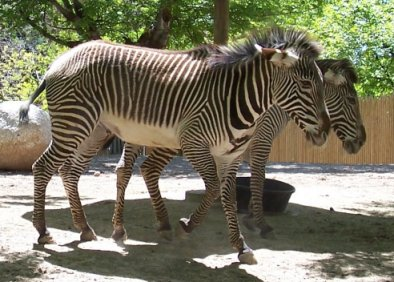
Grevy's zebras

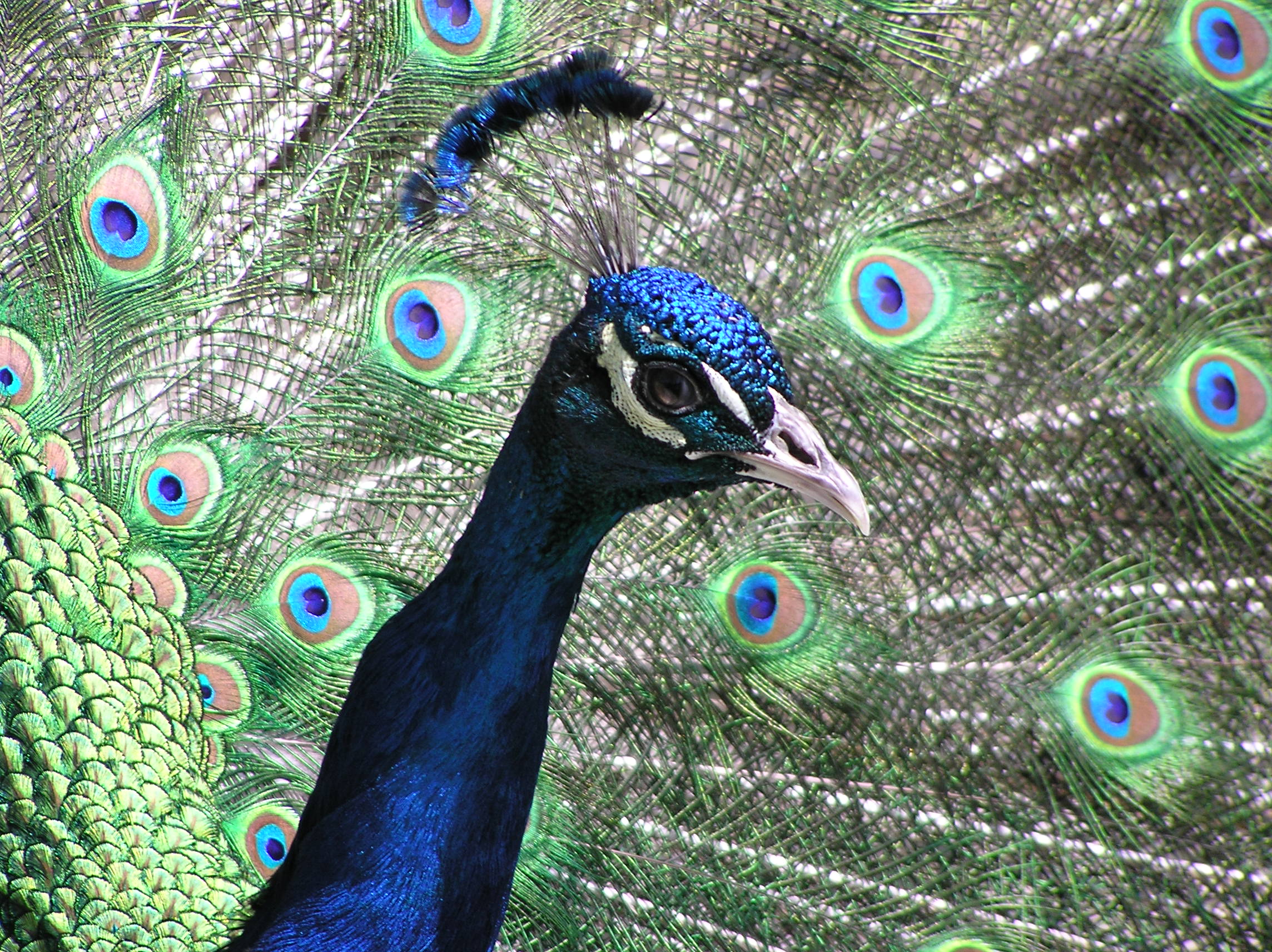
Indian peafowl

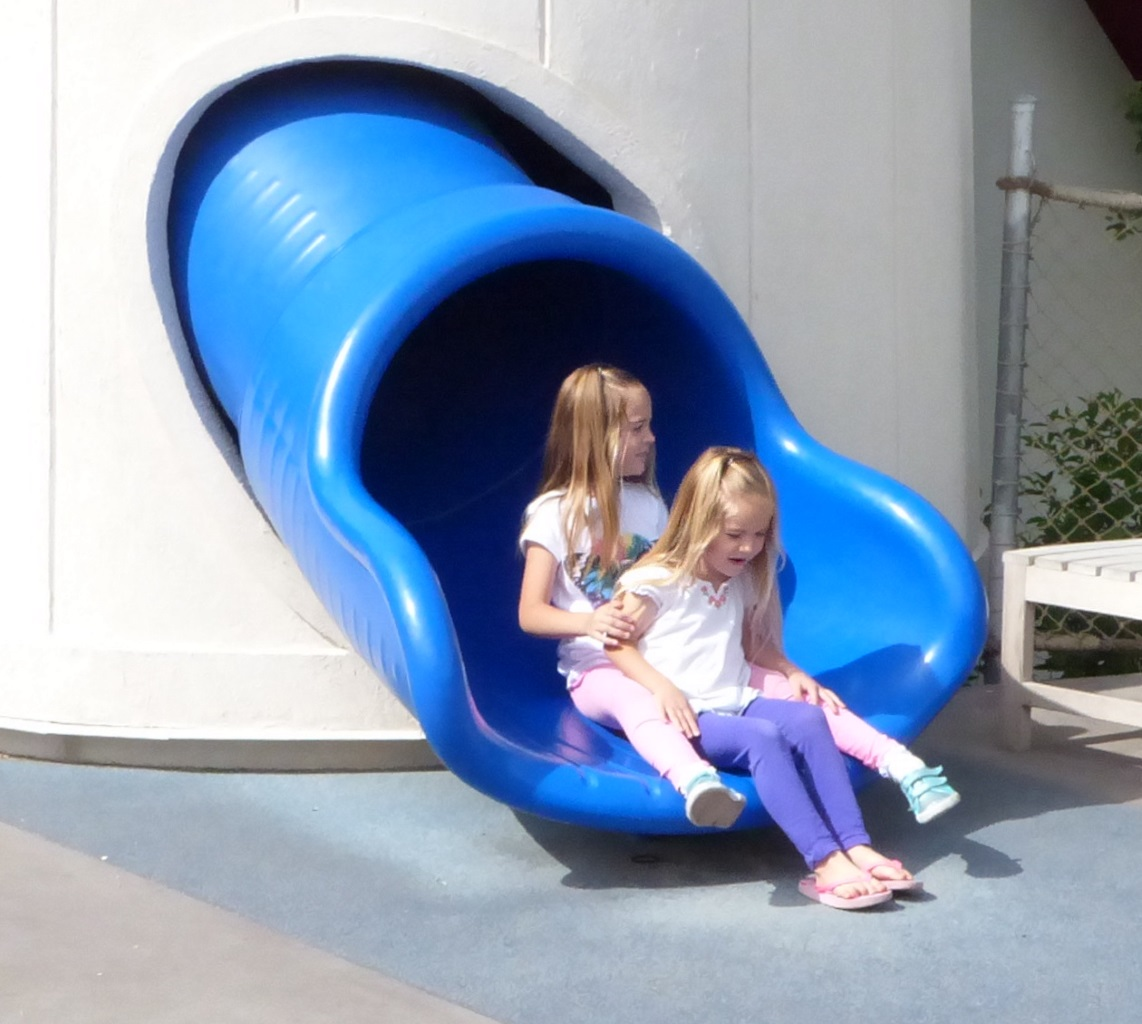
Children's area
