= Washed Ashore =

- Founded: 2010
- Type: 501(c)3
- Purpose: Environmental impact of plastic pollution
- Location: Bandon, OR
- Region served: International
- Product: Educational art of sea life made from ocean debris
- Employees: 11
- Volunteers: 10,000+
- Website: www.washedashore.org

Washed Ashore is a project of the Artula Institute for Art and Environmental Education U.S. 501(c)(3) grassroots non-profit environmental organization that works to bring awareness to the world's growing plastic pollution problem through art. Washed Ashore is a large touring exhibit composed of massive sculptures made up of marine debris collected by volunteers primarily along the southern coast of Oregon. Angela Haseltine Pozzi is the founder and creative director.

== History ==
Founded in 2010 by artist and educator Angela Haseltine Pozzi, the non-profit organization has built over 66 giant sculptures from more than 17 tons of ocean garbage. The exhibit, which includes educational signage, has appeared at numerous venues, including SeaWorld Parks throughout the US, the Virginia Aquarium, the San Francisco Zoo, and The Marine Mammal Center in Sausalito. It has also been hosted by the Newport Visual Arts Center, the Chula Vista Nature Center, Portland Community College, America's Cup Healthy Oceans Exhibit, and the Oregon Coast Aquarium.

== Workshop ==
Based in Bandon, Oregon, the project uses local and area volunteers in workshops held at Bandon's Harbortown Event Center Thursdays through Saturdays (winter hours). The workshops consist of assembling "piece work" which involves drilling holes through plastic and stitching the plastic to wire mesh. These panels will later be fastened by Lead Artist, Angela Haseltine Pozzi, and her team, to welded structures and other artwork as part of Washed Ashore's Traveling Exhibits.
