= Angela Haseltine Pozzi =

American sculptor

- Born: 1957 (age 67–68); Portland, Oregon
- Education: B.S. Education, University of Utah, 1984; M.S. Education, emphasis in Art Education, Portland State University, 1990
- Known for: Sculpture
- Website: http://seathingsart.com/bio.html

Portland State University

Angela Haseltine Pozzi (born 1957) is an American sculptor who uses recycled ocean plastic to create her work. She is also the founder and creative director of Washed Ashore. Her large-scale sculptures include a polar bear, puffin, jellyfish, and an octopus.

== Early life and education ==
Angela Haseltine Pozzi was born in Portland, Oregon, in 1957. Pozzi was born into an artistic family and spent much of her early life on the shores of the Oregon coast. She attended the University of Utah earning a Bachelor's degree in education in 1984. In 1990, she received her Master's in Education from Portland State University, with an emphasis in Art Education.

== Career ==
Pozzi was a teacher for 30 years. After the sudden death of her husband in 2002 she turned to the ocean for healing. After seeing the detriment of plastic pollution along the Oregon coast, she soon realized the ocean also needed healing. She researched the impact of plastic on marine life and in 2010, she founded the Washed Ashore Project. With plastic debris collected from the beaches bordering Bandon, Oregon, she constructs large sculptures of marine life. With the help of over 10,000 volunteers the organization has collected upwards of 40,000 pounds of waste and created 70 sculptures.

== Style ==
Pozzi creates colorful sculptures from everyday waste items such as bottles and bags. Her large-scale sculptures include a polar bear, puffin, jellyfish, and an octopus. She personifies her sculptures by giving them human names, for example her sculpture titled Edward the Leatherback Sea Turtle. Pozzi uses her work to educate the viewer on conservation and tries to engage them to think about the impacts of plastic use on marine environments.
