= Marion Bauer =

American composer (1882–1955)

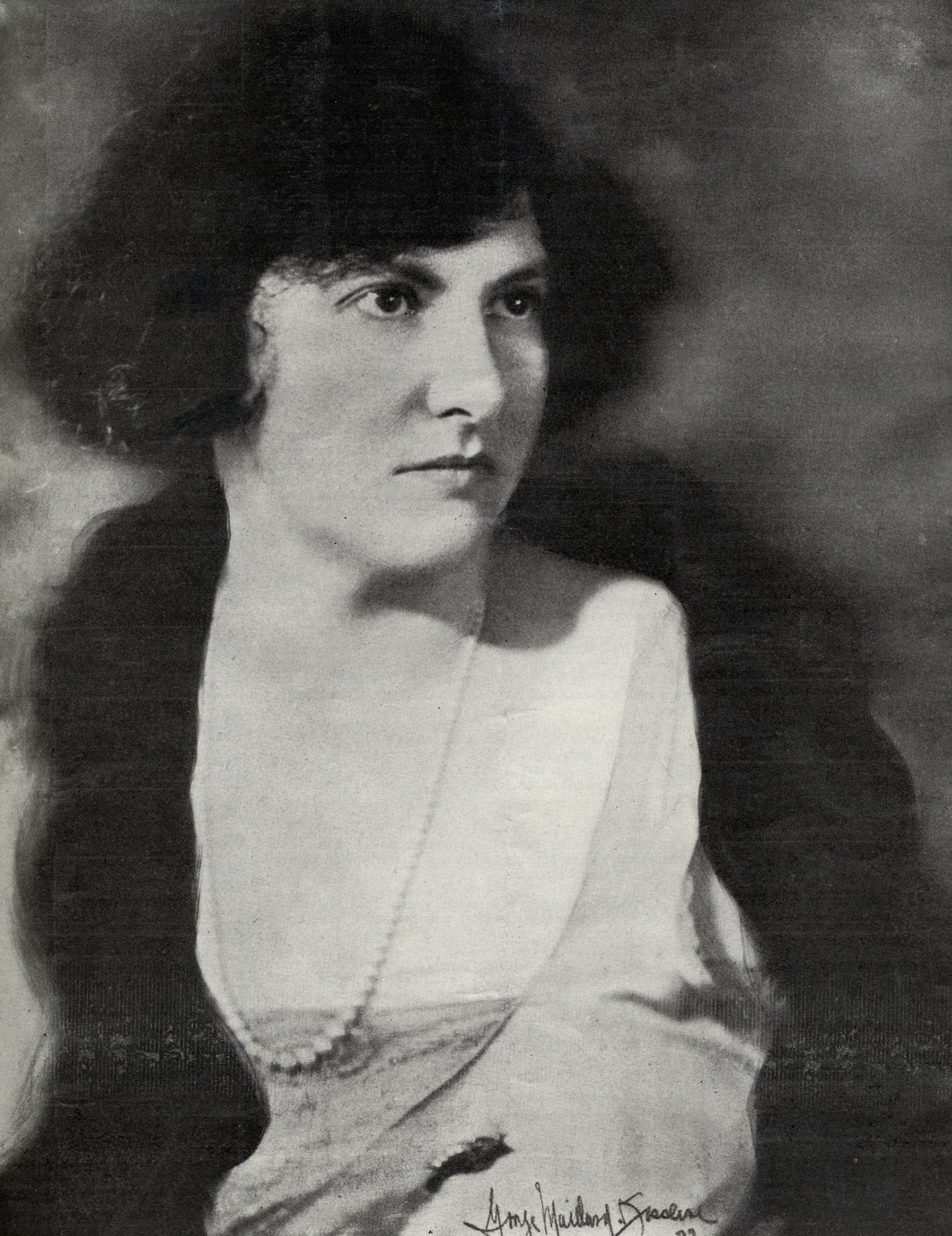
- Born: August 15, 1882; Walla Walla, Washington
- Died: August 9, 1955 (aged 72); South Hadley, Massachusetts

Marion Eugénie Bauer (15 August 1882 – 9 August 1955) was an American composer, teacher, writer, and music critic. She played an active role in shaping American musical identity in the early half of the twentieth century.

As a composer, Bauer wrote for piano, chamber ensembles, symphonic orchestra, solo voice, and vocal ensembles. She gained prominence as a teacher, serving on the faculty of Washington Square College of New York University, where she taught music history and composition from 1926 to 1951. In addition to her position at NYU, Bauer was affiliated with the Juilliard School as a guest lecturer from 1940 until her death in 1955. Bauer also wrote extensively about music: she was the editor for the Chicago-based Musical Leader and authored and co-authored several books including her 1933 text Twentieth Century Music.

Throughout her life, Bauer promoted not only her own work but new music in general. Bauer helped found the American Music Guild, the American Music Center, and the American Composers Alliance, serving as a board member of the latter. Bauer also held leadership roles in both the League of Composers and the Society for the Publication of American Music as a board member and secretary, respectively. With Claire Raphael Reis, Minna Lederman, and others, she was regularly in a leadership position in these organizations.

Bauer's music includes dissonance and extended tertian, quartal, and quintal harmonies, though it rarely goes outside the bounds of extended tonality, save for her brief experimentation with serialism in the 1940s. During her lifetime, she enjoyed many performances of her works, most notably the New York Philharmonic premiere of Sun Splendor in 1947 under the baton of Leopold Stokowski and a 1951 New York Town Hall concert devoted solely to her music.

== Biography ==
=== Early life ===
Marion Bauer was born in Walla Walla, Washington, on August 15, 1882. Her parents – both of French-Jewish background – had immigrated to the United States, where her father Jacques Bauer worked as a shopkeeper and her mother Julie Bauer worked as a teacher of modern languages. Bauer was the youngest of seven children, with an age difference of 17 years between herself and her oldest sister, noted music critic, composer, and educator, Emilie Frances Bauer.

Later in Bauer's childhood, Jacques Bauer, an amateur musician himself, recognized his youngest daughter's musical aptitude, and Bauer began studying piano with Emilie. When Jacques Bauer died in 1890, the Bauers moved to Portland, Oregon, where Bauer graduated from St. Helen's Hall in 1898. Upon completion of secondary school, Bauer joined her sister Emilie in New York City in order to begin focusing on a career in composition.

=== Studies ===
Once in New York, Bauer commenced studies with Henry Holden Huss and Eugene Heffley, in addition to her sister Emilie. In 1905, her studies brought her into contact with French violinist and pianist Raoul Pugno, who was using New York as a base on an extended concert tour of the United States. By virtue of her upbringing in a home headed by French immigrants, Bauer was fluent in both French and English, and was thus able to teach Pugno and his family English. As a result of this favor, Pugno invited Bauer to study with him in Paris in 1906, and it was during this time that Bauer also became the first American to study with Nadia Boulanger, an associate of Pugno's in the Paris music scene. (Ultimately, Boulanger would teach such notable figures as Aaron Copland, David Diamond, Roy Harris and Gail Kubik.) As she had done with Pugno, in exchange for composition lessons from Boulanger, Bauer taught her English.

When she returned to New York in 1907, Bauer continued her studies with Heffley and Walter Henry Rothwell, additionally teaching piano and music theory on her own. After another year of study in Europe from 1910 to 1911, this time focusing on form and counterpoint with Paul Ertel in Berlin, Bauer began to establish herself as a serious composer; it was after this period of study in 1912 that she signed a seven-year contract with [music publisher] Arthur P. Schmidt.

Although active as a composer and private instructor in the years following 1912, Bauer ultimately undertook two more periods of study in Europe, partially facilitated by financial inheritances upon the deaths her mother and older brother. In 1914, she once again returned to Berlin to study with Ertel, but her time there was curtailed by the outbreak of World War I. Almost ten years later, Bauer decided once again to undertake an extended period of study in Europe, this time at the Paris Conservatory with André Gedalge, who had also taught composers such as Maurice Ravel, Darius Milhaud, and Arthur Honegger. At the time, she was 40 years old and offered the following reason for continuing her studies comparatively late in life: "As a member of the American Music Guild, I had the opportunity to measure my powers and my limitations with those of my colleagues....The result was a period of study in Europe. This time I decided in Paris I would find the kind of work and musical environment for which I was seeking." Bauer's studies at the Paris Conservatory, however, were cut short in 1926 when she received the news that her sister Emilie had been hit by a car. Bauer returned to New York, but Emilie's injuries ultimately proved fatal.

=== Career ===
Although Bauer had never earned a college degree (despite her years of study), in September 1926 she was hired as an instructor for New York University's music department, becoming their first female music faculty member. Among her early colleagues were Albert Stoessel, Gustave Reese, and Percy Grainger. During her tenure at NYU from 1926 to 1951, Bauer taught classes in composition, form and analysis, aesthetics and criticism, and music history and appreciation, earning the rank of associate professor in 1930. Bauer taught using her own book, the readings from which would then be followed by class discussions. She also advocated strongly for new music and would play "the few pertinent records and piano rolls available," or have students play unavailable works. Some of her most famous students from her years at NYU included Milton Babbitt, Julia Frances Smith, Miriam Gideon, and conductor Maurice Peress.

In addition to teaching at NYU, Bauer lectured at Juilliard and Columbia University. She also lectured annually at the Chautauqua Summer Music Institute in Chautauqua, New York, putting on lecture-recitals of twentieth-century music with pianist Harrison Potter throughout her career. Potter performed Bauer's piano music in other settings as well, including concerts put on by the League of Composers, the WPA Federal Music Project, the MacDowell Club, and Phi Beta National Fraternity of Music and Speech. During the Great Depression years, Bauer also spent summers teaching at Mills College, the Carnegie Institute, and the Cincinnati Conservatory of Music as well as Juilliard.

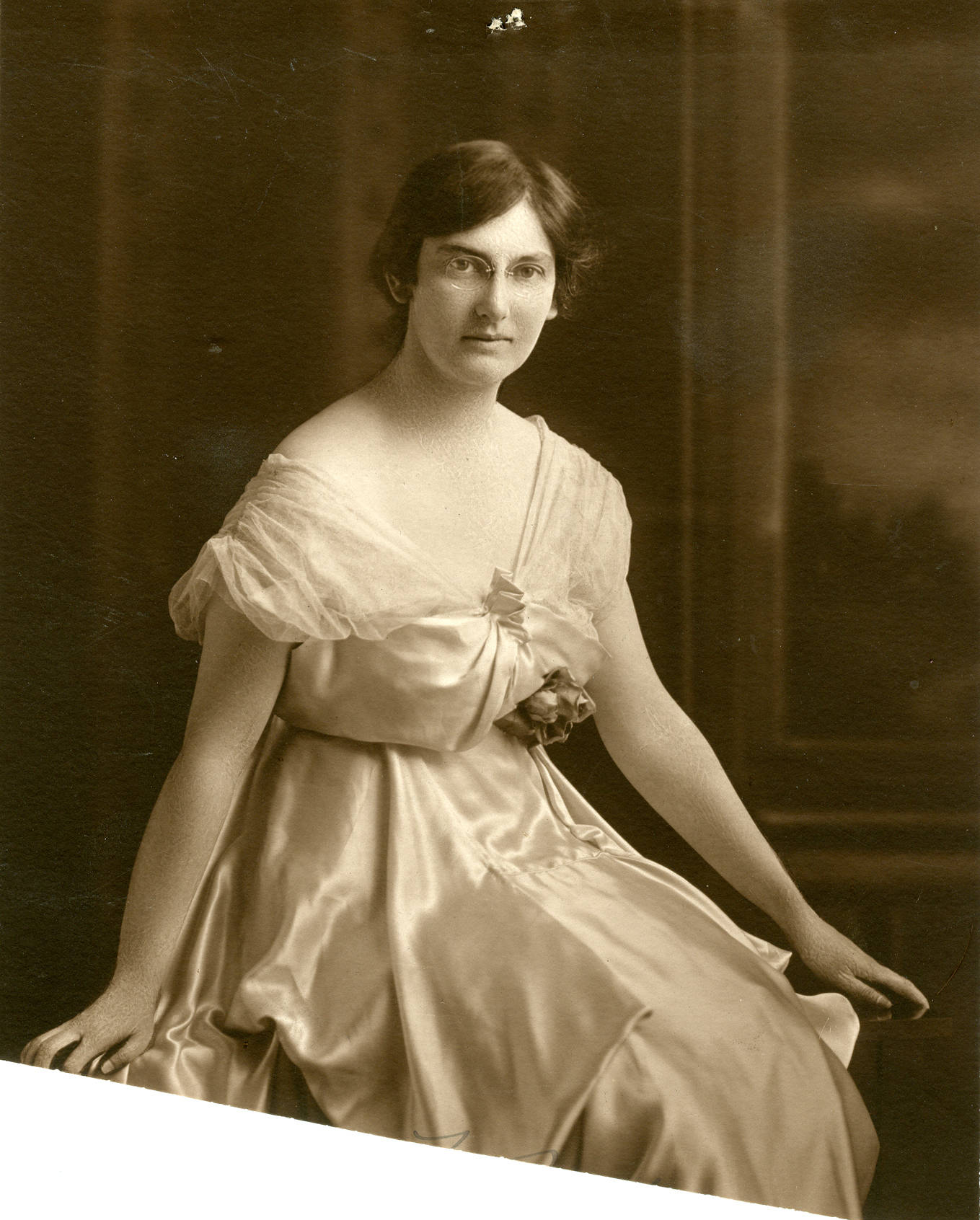
Composer Marion Bauer between 1902 and 1930, unknown photographer

Even with her teaching and lecturing responsibilities, Bauer remained active as a composer. Between 1919 and 1944, she spent a total of twelve summers in residence at the MacDowell Colony, where she met composers such as Ruth Crawford Seeger and Amy Beach and focused on composition. Bauer also helped found the American Music Guild, the American Music Center, and the American Composers Alliance, serving on the board of the latter. In 1937, Aaron Copland founded the League of Composers, and asked Bauer to serve on the executive board of that organization as well. Bauer additionally served as secretary for the Society for the Publication of American Music, and helped co-found the Society of American Women Composers in 1925 along with Amy Beach and eighteen others.

As a writer and music critic, Bauer was respected for "her intellectual approach to new music," yet she also maintained a level of accessibility in her writings. For instance, she was published in various journals, was editor of the highly regarded Chicago-based Musical Leader, and most famously published her book Twentieth Century Music, all of which garnered her respect in the music world. At the same time, though, Bauer made new music accessible to newcomers with her books such as How Music Grew: From Prehistoric Times to the Present Day. Bauer also had a highly inclusive view of what constituted "serious" music, as demonstrated in the content of Twentieth Century Music. Besides being one of the first textbooks to discuss serialism, Twentieth Century Music also mentioned numerous women composers in contrast to other contemporary music textbooks such as Paul Rosenfeld's Musical Portraits, An Hour with American Music and John Tasker Howard's Our Contemporary Composers, which only briefly mentioned women composers, if they were mentioned at all. Bauer's book also discussed modernist works by African American composers and included jazz in its discussion of twentieth-century music.

During her Tenure at New York University, Bauer worked on many manuscripts, now archived at the institution. Such works include, “notes for a proposed book on “Titans of Music” with chapters on Monteverdi (ch. I), Beethoven (ch. IV), and Brahms and the Schumanns (ch. VI); a book on "Modern Creators of Music: A Survey of Contemporary Music and Its Makers" with chapters on Berlioz (ch. II) and Liszt and Wagner (ch. III); and a book on "Some Social Aspects of Music: Its Purpose and Place" with chapters on “The Functions of Music” (pt. I, ch. I), “Music as a Common Language” (pt. I, ch. II), “Music in Therapy and Industry” (pt. I, ch. III) and “Music’s Place in Religion” (pt. I, ch. IV) (Shewbert, 2008). Articles, speeches, and “Contemporary Piano Music: Grade II and III” and “American Piano Music” are also found in these archives. In 1951, Ethel Peyser, an American journalist (1887–1961), wrote of Bauer, “At present, besides her jobs as critic, editor, lecturer, teacher, composer, adviser, she is writing… is it one, two or three books? Who knows!” (“Marion” 7) (Shewbert, 2008, p. 48).

Although she had never earned a formal college degree, Marion Bauer received an honorary Master of Arts degree from Whitman College in 1932 and an honorary Doctor of Music degree from New York University's College of Music in 1951 (Nyu.edu, 14 Nov. 2024) “for distinguished professional services and outstanding achievement in Music Education” (Shewbert, 2008 p. 58).

=== Later years ===
In the spring of 1951, Bauer retired from her position at NYU, although she continued to lecture at Juilliard. Bauer also attended a gathering of MacDowell Colony composers on August 6, 1955. Three days later, on August 9, 1955, while vacationing at the home of Harrison Potter and his wife in South Hadley, Massachusetts, Bauer died of a heart attack, just shy of her 73rd birthday. She is buried with her sisters Emilie and Minnie in the Kensico Cemetery in Valhalla, New York.

In 1952, Marion Bauer received the Henry Hadley citation for “Distinguished Service to American Music,” along with three other recipients. This award was presented to Bauer at the annual meeting of the National Association for American Composers and Conductors. The same year, Bauer gave her last lecture at Chautauqua, a social and educational convention held in Chautauqua, New York. Featuring many writers, musicians, teachers, and other influential figures, Bauer delivered a speech on “The Meaning of Music.” The year after, “Bauer was honored for contributing ‘the best in children’s music during 1953’ for her pedagogical piano collection, Summertime Suite.”

WNYC, a New York media company, presented a program of Bauer’s compositions in 1954, with support from the American Composers’ Alliance. This program, performed by pianist Dorothy Eustis, included Bauer's works, “Sun Splendor,” “Dance Sonata,” “Here Alone,” “Dreams in the Dusk,” and “From the Shore.” Vocal pieces were sung by tenor Carey Sparks.

Marion Bauer's last remaining sibling, Flora, passed away on February 9, 1954, at age 80 (Shewbert, 2014, p.217). Following the loss of her sister, Bauer stepped down as the New York Editor of the periodical, The Musical Leader, only a few months later. In the summer of 1955, only a few days before her tragic death, Marion attended a celebration at the MacDowell Colony in Peterborough, New Hampshire, and wrote to Mrs. MacDowell regarding her enjoyment of the event and grief for her sister, Flora. Bauer wrote, “In spite of the enjoyment I got out of the entire experience, it made me feel sad too. My thoughts of Flora and the many happy years we had there with you and Nina Maud were quite overwhelming. But I have had to learn to make the happy moments outweigh the sorrowful ones…. I did so appreciate your last sweet letter. How well you understand what Flora’s going meant to me. But I have been busy and have gone ahead as well as I know how.”

== Music ==
=== Style and influences ===
Although very much an advocate of contemporary music, Bauer herself was considered relatively conservative as a composer; her works from the 1910s-1920s mostly contain a pitch center, and she only turned to serialism briefly in the 1940s with works such as Patterns. She also experimented with spoken words set to music. Her music is generally melodically driven, using "extended tonality [and] emphasizing colouristic harmony and diatonic dissonance." Both impressionistic and romantic influences feature in her works, but Bauer's studies with André Gedalge particularly marked a change in her style from conventionally tonal to a more impressionistic, post-tonal idiom as demonstrated in her 1924 works Quietude and Turbulence. For the remainder of her career, though, Bauer continued to integrate both the romanticism advocated by her German teachers with the impressionism she encountered in Paris and in the music of her close friend Charles Tomlinson Griffes. The influence of the latter is particularly evident in comparing Bauer's 1917 work Three Impressions for piano to Griffes's Roman Sketches published a year earlier: each is an impressionistic-style suite with a poem preceding each movement.

The discrepancy between the relative conservatism of Bauer's work versus the more experimental works she advocated in her writings such as Twentieth Century Music is partially explained by her publisher Arthur P. Schmidt's hesitation to support her early modernist inclinations in composition. Schmidt and Bauer, although maintaining a close relationship, notably disagreed on style. It is inferred that when Bauer's seven-year contract was about to expire, Schmidt requested that Bauer simplify her compositional style, as indicated by Bauer's response to his correspondence: "It is not stubbornness on my part not to write simple things. I can only write what I feel–and someday (soon I hope) I shall learn to do the big simple thing. I must do my work in steps–evolutionary, not revolutionary. I have so little time to write that naturally change of style is slow." It is also possible that the experience of having her Violin Sonata (later published under the title Fantasia Quasi Una Sonata) demoted from first to second place in the 1928 Society for the Publication of American Music competition expressly for its "modernist tendencies" led Bauer to adopt a comparatively conservative style of composition.

Bauer did, however, play a significant role in the development of non-tertian harmony in American music. Along with Ernest Bloch, Bauer was one of the first American composers to experiment with quintal harmony, or harmony based on stacked fifths, as demonstrated in her 1926 solo piano version of Sun Splendor and her writings about it. The development of this harmonic technique in turn influenced the music of Aaron Copland.

=== Notable collaborations and performances ===
During her lifetime, Bauer's music was well received by performers, critics, and the public alike. Virtuoso violinist Maud Powell commissioned "Up the Ocklawaha" in 1912, an impressionistic work for violin and piano that programmatically reflected Powell's own excursion on the Ocklawaha River in north central Florida. Up the Ocklawaha was subject of much praise upon its premiere. In 1915 and 1916, respected opera singers May Dearborn-Schwab, Mary Jordan, and Elsa Alves were featured on two all-Bauer programs presented in New York, accompanied by Bauer herself. The 1916 performance featured twenty of Bauer's songs, and received a favorable review in The Musical Leader.

By virtue of her activities in various composition circles, particularly the League of Composers and the New York Composer's Forum, Bauer was well-situated to have even her larger-scale, more resource-intensive works performed. Notably, Bauer was the second woman to have her work performed by the New York Philharmonic: Leopold Stokowski conducted the premiere of her Sun Splendor at Carnegie Hall in 1947. Despite this high-profile exposure, though, Sun Splendor was never published in any of its forms – as a piano solo, duet, or orchestral piece – and the only recording currently available is that of the original performance, housed in the New York Philharmonic Archives.

An event Bauer herself considered one of the highlights of her entire career was the May 8, 1951 New York Town Hall concert devoted exclusively to her music. Sponsored by the Phi Beta fraternity at the time of Bauer's retirement from NYU, the works performed that day spanned her entire career and included two previously unperformed works: the Dance Sonata, Op. 24 (1932) for dancer and piano (later expanded and revised as Moods for solo piano) and Trio Sonata II for flute, cello, and piano. Marion Bauer is noted as “one of the fraternity’s most illustrious and honored members” and National Music Advisor. The concert was reviewed by Olin Downes of the New York Times, who wrote positively of the event : "The music is prevailingly contrapuntal and dissonance is not absent. Yet the fundamental concept is melodic, the thinking clear and logical, the sentiment sincere and direct." This feature was also described as “one of the great events of her professional career” by author Madeleine Goss, who mentioned it in her book, Modern Music-Makers: Contemporary American Composers, in 1952 (Goss, Modern Music-Makers, 136).

== Personal life ==
=== Personality ===
By the recollections of friends, colleagues, and students, Bauer was a kindhearted, good-humored person, who treated others with warmth, compassion, and generosity. Milton Babbitt recalls in his introduction to the 1978 edition of Twentieth Century Music how he and his classmates referred to Bauer "not derisively but affectionately" as 'Aunt Marion' for her matronly manner and appearance, and even for her classes, which were conducted so as to be suitable for occurrence at teatime in a genteel parlor." He too describes Bauer as generous and sensitive, particularly in terms of guiding her students' careers, but also in terms of her writing due to the fact that she mentions so many composers and organizations. Frederick Stoessel, a friend and former student of Bauer, “wrote of her humanity, her ‘gentility, her kindness, and her sensitivity,’” twenty-one years after her death.

Bauer was devoted to promoting the work of her pupils. She would write letters to music publishers and editors, and would even send her pupils directly to them until they were given a chance. Her commitment to championing new composers often occurred at the expense of her own compositional output.

=== Religious affiliation ===
Despite her birth to Jewish immigrants, Bauer appears not to have been an observant Jew in adulthood. Although Bauer's memorial service was conducted by a rabbi, she was cremated thereafter, which is forbidden by official Jewish law. Both Maurice Peress, a former student, and Frederic Stoessel said that Bauer practiced Christian Science, a claim further supported by a letter Bauer wrote in 1923 expressing "a desire to publish a song appropriate for a Christian Science service." No official confirmation of Bauer's religious affiliation has been found yet, however.

=== Sexual orientation ===
Bauer never married, and much of her personal life remains a mystery. She lived with and was supported by her sister Emilie until Emilie's death in 1926. At that point, Bauer went to live with her other sister Flora, who also lived in New York City, a living arrangement that lasted until Flora's death in the early 1950s.

Although unconfirmed, Ruth Crawford Seeger's writings, when considered along with remarks by Martin Bernstein (a longtime friend of Bauer's and a former chair of NYU music dept.) and Milton Babbitt, imply that Bauer may have been a lesbian. Crawford and Bauer met at the MacDowell Colony in 1929, where Bauer quickly became a mentor and close friend to the much younger Crawford. Although Crawford preferred to characterize their relationship as one of "sisterly-motherly love," she also acknowledged that, at one time, their relationship had bordered on becoming sexual, particularly on Bauer's part when she reserved a single hotel room for the two of them at the International Festival of Contemporary Music in Liège in September 1930, which made Crawford "uncomfortable." Along with Crawford's perceptions of her relationship with Bauer, Martin Bernstein stated: "[A]s a female, [Bauer] had very little interest in men [emphasis in original]...At least if she had any romantic liaisons with men, we don't know about it." Babbitt further substantiated Bernstein's thoughts during an interview about Bauer when he remarked, "And she was very much a...let's simply say unmarried. But she was an absolute dear." Conclusive evidence as to Bauer's sexual orientation has not yet been established.

== Legacy ==
Bauer's legacy can be measured not only by her output of at least 160 compositions along with her five books, but also by the impact she had on the careers of both Ruth Crawford Seeger and Milton Babbitt, who went on to become well-known American composers of the twentieth century. After they met at the MacDowell Colony in 1929, Bauer encouraged Crawford's efforts in composition and "contributed greatly to Crawford's musical growth and her professional visibility." For Crawford, Bauer represented a powerful connection to the musical establishment. With her position at the Musical Leader, Bauer was able to publish "a glowing review of a private concert of Crawford's music"; additionally, Bauer introduced Crawford to Gustave Reese, an editor at the G. Schirmer publishing company at the time.

Bauer also played a significant role in Babbitt's career development. Babbitt decided to study with her at NYU in February 1934 after reading her 1933 edition of Twentieth Century Music. In the introduction to the later edition, Babbitt recollected his thoughts upon reading the work for the first time: "[H]ere was a book...which concerned itself interestedly, admiringly, enthusiastically, even affectionately with works of music which, in most academic environments, were unmentionables, untouchables, and unspeakables, and anywhere else were unknowns." Babbitt specifically mentions his appreciation for her discussion of the serialist composers with accompanying musical examples; during the Depression years, scores (especially of new music) were prohibitively expensive to own personally, and only a few libraries had copies. Babbitt greatly respected Bauer, saying in 1983 that Bauer was "a wonderful lady...whose name I'm going to do everything in the world to immortalize."

== Works ==
(From the list of Bauer's works in New Grove unless otherwise indicated)

Orchestral Works:

- Lament on an African Theme, Op. 20a, strings (1927)
- Sun Splendor (?1936)
- Symphonic Suite, Op. 34, strings (1940)
- Piano Concerto "American Youth," Op. 36, (1943) (arranged for 2 pianos 1946)
- Symphony No. 1, Op. 45, (1947–1950)
- Prelude and Fugue, Op. 43, flute and strings (1948 rev. 1949)

Chamber works:

- Up the Ocklawaha, Op. 6, violin and piano (1913)
- Sonata No. 1, Op. 14, violin and piano (1921 rev. 1922)
- String Quartet, Op. 20 (1925)
- Fantasia Quasi una Sonata, Op. 18, violin and piano (1925)
- Suite (Duo), Op. 25, oboe and clarinet (1932)
- Sonata, Op. 22, viola or clarinet and piano (1932)
- Concertino, Op. 32b, oboe, clarinet, and string quartet or orchestra (1939 rev. 1943)
- Trio Sonata No. 1, Op. 40, flute, cello, piano (1944)
- Five Pieces (Patterns) Op. 41, string quartet (1946–1949, no. 2 arranged for double woodwind quintet and double bass—1948)
- Aquarelle, Op. 39/2a, double woodwind quintet, 2 double basses (1948)
- Trio Sonata No. 2, Op. 47, flute, cello, piano (1951)
- Woodwind Quintet, Op. 48, flue, oboe, clarinet, bassoon, horn (1952?)

Keyboard works (for piano unless otherwise noted):

- Three Impressions, Op. 10 (1918)
- From the New Hampshire Woods, Op. 12 (1922)
- Three Preludettes (1921)
- Six Preludes, op. 15 (1922)
- Turbulence, op. 17/2 (1924)
- A Fancy (1927)
- Sun Splendor, (?1929, arranged for 2 pianos ?1930)
- Four Piano Pieces, op. 21 (1930)
- Dance Sonata, op. 24 (1932)
- Moods (Three Moods for Dance), op. 46 (1950/4)
- Anagrams, op. 48 (1950)
- Meditation and Toccata, organ (1951)

Choral works:

- Wenn ich rufe an dich, Herr, mein Gott (Ps xxviii), op. 3, Soprano, women's chorus, organ/piano (1903)
- Fair Daffodils (R. Herrick), women's chorus, keyboard (1914)
- Orientale (E. Arnold), soprano, orchestra (1914, orchestrated 1932, rev. 1934)
- The Lay of the Four Winds (C.Y. Rice), Op. 8, male chorus, piano (1915)
- Three Noëls (L.I. Guiney, trad.), Op. 22, Nos. 1–3, women's chorus, piano (1930)
- Here at High Morning (M. Lewis), Op. 27, male chorus (1931)
- The Thinker, Op. 35, mixed chorus (1938)
- China (B. Todrin), Op. 38, mixed chorus, orchestra/piano (1943)
- At the New Year (K. Patchen), Op. 42, mixed chorus, piano (1947)
- Death Spreads his Gentle Wings (E.P. Crain), mixed chorus (1949 rev. 1951)
- A Foreigner Comes to Earth on Boston Common (H. Gregory), Op. 49, soprano, tenor, mixed chorus, piano (1953)

Other vocal works:

- "Coyote Song" (J.S. Reed), baritone, piano (1912)
- "Send Me a Dream" (Intuition) (E.F. Bauer), solo voice, piano (1912)
- "Phillis" (C.R. Defresny), medium voice, piano (1914)
- "By the Indus" (Rice), solo voice, piano (1917)
- "My Faun" (O. Wilde), solo voice, piano (1919)
- "Night in the Woods" (E.R. Sill), medium voice, piano (1921)
- "The Driftwood Fire" (Katharine Adams), solo voice, piano (1921) (not listed in New Grove)
- "The Epitaph of a Butterfly" (T. Walsh), solo voice, piano (1921)
- "A Parable" (The Blade of Grass) (S. Crane), solo voice, piano (1922)
- "Four Poems" (J.G. Fletcher), Op. 16, high voice, piano (1924)
- "Faun Song," alto, chamber orchestra (1934)
- "Four Songs (Suite)," soprano, string quartet (1935 rev. 1936)
- "Songs in the Night" (M.M.H. Ayers), solo voice, piano (1943)
- "The Harp" (E.C. Bailey), solo voice, piano (1947)
- "Swan" (Bailey), solo voice, piano (1947)

== Written works ==
(From the list of Bauer's works in New Grove)

- With Ethel Peyser: How Music Grew: From Prehistoric Times to the Present Day (New York: 1925, rev. 1939)
- With Ethel Peyser: Music through the Ages: a Narrative for Student and Layman (New York, 1932, enlarged 3/1967 by Elizabeth Rogers as Music through the Ages: an Introduction to Music History)
- Twentieth Century Music (New York, 1933, rev. 2/1947)
- Musical Questions and Quizzes: a Digest of Information about Music (New York, 1941)
- With Ethel Peyser: How Opera Grew: from Ancient Greece to the Present Day (New York, 1956)
- "Marion Eugenie Bauer Papers: NYU Special Collections Finding Aids." New York University, 14 November 2024. Accessed 1 December 2025.
- Edwards, J. Michele. "Marion Eugénie Bauer." Jewish Women's Archive. Accessed 1 December 2025.
- Shewbert, Sarah Grace. “Marion Bauer’s ‘Completely Musical Life’ (1882–1955): An American Composer's Essential Creative Works and Contributions to Twentieth-Century Music.” PhD diss., University of Washington, 13 October 2014. Accessed 1 December 2025.
- “Champion of American Composer.” *The New York Times*, 14 August 1955.
- Shewbert, Sarah Grace. “The Versatile Marion Bauer (1882–1955): American Composer, Lecturer, Writer.” Master's thesis, University of Portland, Spring 2008.
- Goss, Madeline. *Modern Music-Makers: Contemporary American Composers*. ABC-CLIO, LLC, 1952.
- Bauer, Marion. “NAACC Makes Annual Awards.” *Musical Leader* 84, no. 6 (June 1952): 10.
- “Composers of Children’s Music Honored.” *Musical Leader* 86 (April 1954): 10.

== Sources ==
- Ambache, Diana. Liner notes to Marion Bauer: American Youth Concerto performed by the Ambache Chamber Orchestra and Ensemble. Naxos (8.559253), 2005. Compact disc.
- Ammer, Christine. Unsung: A History of Women in American Music, Century ed. Portland: Amadeus Press, 2001. ISBN 978-1-57467-058-5.
- Babbitt, Milton. "Introduction to Marion Bauer's Twentieth Century Music (1978)." The Collected Essays of Milton Babbitt. Ed. Stephen Peles, Stephen Dembski, Andrew Mead, and Joseph N. Straus. Princeton: Princeton University Press, 2003. ISBN 978-0-691-08966-9.
- Block, Adrienne Fried. "Arthur P. Schmidt, Music Publisher and Champion of American Women Composers." The Musical Woman: An International Perspective, v. 2. Eds. Judith Lang Zaimont, Catherine Overhauser, and Jane Gottlieb. Westport, CT: Greenwood Press, 1987. ISBN 978-0-313-23588-7.
- Edwards, J. Michele. "Bauer, Marion Eugénie." The New Grove Dictionary of Music and Musicians. Ed. Stanley Sadie. London: MacMillan, 1980. II: 924. ISBN 978-0-333-23111-1.
- Edwards, J. Michele. "Marion Eugénie Bauer." Jewish Women's Archive. Accessed June 9, 2011.
- Hisama, Ellie. Gendering Musical Modernism: The Music of Ruth Crawford, Marion Bauer, and Miriam Gideon. Cambridge, NY: Cambridge University Press, 2001. ISBN 978-0-521-64030-5.
- Hisama, Ellie. Liner notes to Music of Marion Bauer performed by Virginia Eskin, Deborah Boldin, and Irina Muresanu. Albany Records (TR465), 2001. Compact disc.
- Pickett, Susan. "Chapter 15: Marion in Paris, 1923-1926." The Bauer Sisters. Unpublished. Used with special permission of the author.
- Pickett, Susan. "Chapter 19: Sun Splendor, Fantasia Quasi Una Sonata: A New Twist, String Quartet, 1926–1930." The Bauer Sisters. Unpublished. Used with special permission of the author.
- Pickett, Susan. "From the Wild West to New York Modernism." The Maud Powell Signature, Women in Music: The March of the Women 2, no. 2 (June 2008): 32–45. Accessed March 22, 2011.
- Silberberg, Naftali. "Why does Jewish law forbid cremation?" Chabad.org. Accessed June 9, 2011.
- Tawa, Nicholas E. Mainstream Music of Early Twentieth Century America: The Composers, Their Times, and Their Works. Westport, CT: Greenwood Press, 1992. ISBN 978-0-313-28563-9.
