= Ethel Peyser =

American writer and journalist

Ethel Rose Peyser (March 6, 1887 - September 12, 1961) was an American writer and journalist.

Born in New York City, Peyser studied at Vassar College, Barnard College, and Columbia University Teachers College, receiving her bachelor's degree from the latter in 1908. Beginning in 1912 she worked for the New York Herald Tribune, in its editorial department; in 1914 she moved to the New York Evening Mail. From 1926 until 1934 she was on the staff of the Musical Leader as a music critic, at the same time writing pieces for other music journals; she held positions with various general-interest magazines, such as Home & Garden and Good Housekeeping, and wrote articles and books on a variety of domestic subjects. With Marion Bauer she wrote How Music Grew (first published in 1925) and Music Through the Ages (first published in 1932). Other books include How to Enjoy Music (1933); The Book of Culture: the Basis of a Liberal Education (first published in 1934); The House that Music Built: Carnegie Hall (1936), and How Opera Grew (1956). Peyser died in the city of her birth.
