= Emerson Whithorne =

American classical pianist and composer

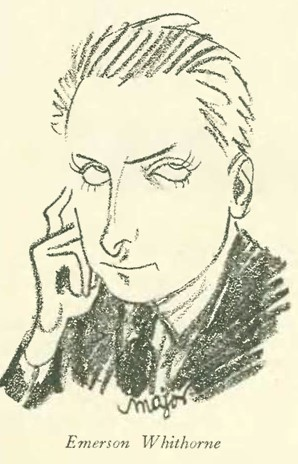
Emerson Whithorne by Henry Major, from The New Yorker, 18 April 1925

Emerson Whithorne, birth surname Whittern (September 6, 1884 in Cleveland, Ohio - March 25, 1958) was a notable American pianist, composer, administrator and critic. He had a reputation as an authority on the music of China. He wrote music criticism for Musical America and the Pall Mall Gazette.

== Education ==
Whithorne was born in Cleveland, where he first studied piano and music theory with James Hotchkiss Rogers. At the age of 15 he toured on the Chautauqua circuit as a pianist for two seasons. He then continued his studies in Vienna, where his teachers were Theodor Leschetizky (piano) and Robert Fuchs (composition and counterpoint).

== London ==
While in Vienna Whithorne met pianist and composer Ethel Leginska, then aged 19. They married in 1907 and settled in London, where they sometimes performed duets together, with Whithorne playing the second part in two-piano pieces during her recitals. He taught, wrote music criticism and began composing while also acting as Leginska's concert manager for the first two years of their marriage. A son, Cedric Whithorne, was born in September 1908. Leginska made her unofficial American debut at Cleveland's Hippodrome, a vaudeville theater. The couple separated in 1910 and divorced in 1916. Ethel mounted an unsuccessful fight for the custody of their son Cedric,

While in London Whithorne became known for several works influenced by Japanese and Chinese music. During this period he also provided incidental music for the oriental drama The Yellow Jacket (1912, by Hazelton and Benrimo) and The Typhoon (1914).

In 1913 the newspapers reported that Whithorne was taken to court for playing the piano at unsocial hours in his flat at Sydney Terrace, Fulham Road, South Kensington by his landlord and by a dentist living and working in the same property. He won the case in November 1913, but hostilities continued into the following month.

== Return to the U.S. ==
After his marriage failed he returned to the U.S. in 1915, serving as executive editor for the Art Publications Society of St. Louis for the next five years. He was also vice president of the Composers Music Corporation, publishers, until 1922, when he devoted himself to composition full time. His compositions were premiered by major orchestras, including the Cincinnati Symphony Orchestra, the Cleveland Orchestra, and the Boston Symphony Orchestra.

Whithorne died of a heart ailment at his New York apartment, 40 East Sixty-second Street, aged 73. He was survived by his second wife Jane.

== Composition ==
Whithorne served on the Council of the International Composers' Guild (ICG). His composition Greek Impressions for string quartet was the opening piece for the very first of the concerts the ICG organised, held at Greenwich Village Theatre on 19 February 1922. A year later two of his songs, 'Tears' (from Two Chinese Nocturnes) and the Walt Whitman setting Invocations, received their world premiere at the Klaw Theatre, a Broadway theatre on 4 March 1923, also under the auspices of the ICG. However his piece was performed immediately prior to Edgard Varèse's Hyperprism which led to a riot. Following this there was a dispute between Claire Reis and Varèse about programming, and Whithorne left the ICG to join Reis's new organisation, the League of Composers.

The piano suite New York Days and Nights (1922), in which the elements of polytonality show him evolving towards a more modernist style. It was performed at the Salzburg Chamber Music Festival in 1923 and later orchestrated in both symphonic and jazz-band arrangements. Sooner or Later, a ballet depicting three stages of human development - past, present and future - was staged by the Neighborhood Playhouse, New York, in 1925. His Symphony No. 1 in C minor, composed in 1929, was premiered by the Cincinnati Symphony Orchestra conducted by Eugene Goossens in 1934, and also performed by the Cleveland Orchestra, which also performed his Symphony No. 2 a year later. Moon Trail was premiered in 1933 by Serge Koussevitzky and the Boston Symphony Orchestra. Sierra Morena was premiered in 1938 by Pierre Monteux and the NBC Symphony Orchestra

== Partial list of compositions ==
Orchestral

- The Rain (fp. Detroit, 22 February 1913)
- La nuit, arrangement from piano piece (1917)
- Adventures of a Samurai, suite (1919)
- Ranga, symphonic poem (1920)
- The Aeroplane, arrangement from piano piece (fp. Birmingham, England, 30 January 1926)
- New York Days and Nights, arrangement of piano suite (fp. Philadelphia, 30 July 1926)
- Fata morgana, symphonic poem, op. 44 (1927)
- Poem, for piano and orchestra, op. 43 (fp. Chicago, 4 February 1927)
- Violin Concerto, op. 46 (1928–1931, fp. Chicago, 12 November 1931 )
- Symphony No. 1, op. 49 (1929, fp. Cincinnati, 12 January 1934)
- Dream Pedlar, symphonic poem, op. 50 (1930, fp. Los Angeles, 15 January 1931)
- Fandango (1931)
- Fandance (1932)
- Moon Trail, symphonic poem (fp. Boston, 15 December 1933)
- Symphony No. 2, op. 56 (1935, fp. Cincinnati, 19 March 1937)
- Sierra morena (fp. New York, 7 May 1938)
- Stroller's Serenade for strings (1943)

Incidental music

- The Yellow Jacket, oriental drama (1912, New York and London)
- The Typhoon (1914)
- Sooner or Later, ballet in six acts (Irene Lewisohn), for chorus and chamber orchestra (1925)
- Marco Millions (Eugene O'Neill), arr. for piano as At the Court of Kubla Khan (1928)

Chamber and instrumental

- String Quartet No. 1, Quartettino orientale, op. 5
- The Rain for piano, op. 12 No. 1 (1916)
- Hototogisu (The Cuckoo) for piano, op. 14. No. 1 (1916)
- Greek Impressions for string quartet, op. 18 (1917)
- La Nuit for piano, op. 35, No. 1 (1917)
- The Aeroplane for piano (c. 1920)
- New York Days and Nights, piano suite (c. 1922)
  - 'Pell Street'
  - 'Chimes of St. Patrick's'
  - 'Times Square'
- Piano Quintet, op. 48 (1928)
- String Quartet No. 2 (1930)
- Violin Sonata (1932)
- El camino real, suite for piano (1937)
- Hommage (to Paderewski), op. 58 No. 2 for piano (1942)

Vocal

- Put by the Lute, song, op. 15, No. 1 (1912)
- By the Eastern Gate, song, op. 16, No. 1 (before 1918)
- In the Cypress Grove, song, op. 24, No. 3 (before 1918)
- Invocation, poem for voice and piano, text Walt Whitman, op. 29, No. 1 (1921)
- Two Chinese Poems for voice and piano, 8th century texts, op. 18 (1921)
  - 'The King of Liang'
  - 'The Feast'
- Two Chinese Nocturnes for voice and piano (1921), Chinese texts translated by Launcelot Cranmer-Byng
  - 'Tears'
  - 'The golden nenuphar'
- Saturday’s Child for mezzo-soprano, tenor, and chamber orchestra, text Countee Cullen (fp. New York, 13 March 1926)
- The Grim Troubador for medium voice and string quartet or piano, text Countee Cullen (1927)
