= Walter Kramer =

Walter Kramer may refer to:

- Walter R. Kramer (1914–1995), American badminton player
- A. Walter Kramer, American music critic, music publisher, and composer
- Walter Krämer (born 1948), German economist and statistician
- Walter Kraemer (1892–1941), German communist politician and resistance member
- Walter Kramer (field hockey), played Field hockey at the 1999 Pan American Games
- Wally Kramer, in 1986 Australian Touring Car Championship
