= The Musical Leader =

American music magazine

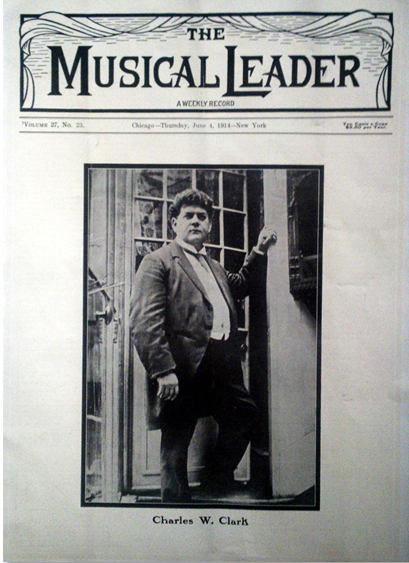
June 1914 cover

The Musical Leader was an American periodical founded in Chicago in 1895 by Florence French and her husband, Charles F. French. In 1910 the magazine cooperated with New York City magazine, The Concert Goer, and opened an office there. There were European correspondents of The Musical Leader who provided reports from various cities, including Leipzig, Dresden, Munich, Vienna, Paris and London. By 1913 the magazine had 10,000 subscribers. The publication ran until 1967.

== Publishers, editors, authors ==
- Charles F. French (1861–1916), founding joint-editor
- Florence M. French (1868–1941), founding joint-editor
- J. French Demerath (née Josephine Ethel French; 1893–1975; daughter of Charles & Florence)
- Evelyn French Smith (née Evelyn French; born 1892; daughter of Charles & Florence)
- Marion Bauer (1882–1955)
- Emilie Frances Bauer (1865–1926) (Marion's sister)
