= Emilie Frances Bauer =

American musician and critic

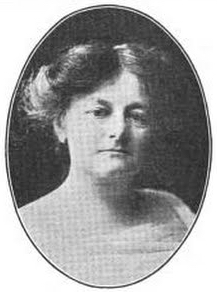
- Emilie Frances Bauer, from a 1912 publication
- Born: March 5, 1865; Walla Walla, Washington
- Died: March 9, 1926 (aged 61); New York City, US
- Other names: Francisco di Nogero (pseudonym)
- Occupations: Writer, editor, composer, pianist, arts critic

Emilie Frances Bauer (pseudonym: Francisco di Nogero; March 5, 1865 – March 9, 1926) was an American music critic, editor, composer, and pianist.

== Early life ==
Emilie Frances Bauer was born in Walla Walla, Washington, the daughter of Jacques Bauer (1834–1890) and Julia Heyman Bauer. She may have been the first Jewish child ever born in Walla Walla. Both parents were immigrants from Alsace; her father was a shopkeeper and her mother a teacher. She studied music with her father, with Miguel Espinosa in San Francisco, and at the Paris Conservatoire. She was the older sister and first piano teacher of composer Marion Bauer.

== Career ==
Bauer taught piano in Walla Walla and Portland, Oregon. She was a music critic for Portland Oregonian, editor for the Musical Courier, music teacher in Boston (1896), editor for The Musical Leader (1900–1926), editor of a women's page in The Etude (1902–1903), critic for the New York Evening Mail (1906–1912), weekly contributor to the San Francisco Chronicle, Portland Oregonian and the Concertgoer. While she was living in San Francisco in 1912, she gave a lecture series on music.

Bauer sometimes wrote and composed music under the masculine pen-name "Francisco di Nogero". Among her known compositions were the songs "My Love is a Muleteer" (1917) and "Our Flag in France" (1917). For the latter song, she donated the royalties to the American Ambulance Hospital in Paris. In 1918, she and her sister were guests of honor at a musicale hosted by the Brooklyn Music School Settlement.

== Personal life ==
Emilie Frances Bauer died in 1926, aged 61 years, in New York City. In February 2020, the Fort Walla Walla Museum held a program of music by Emilie Frances Bauer and Marion Bauer.
