= Grammy Lifetime Achievement Award =

Music award given to performers or groups

- Awarded for: "performers who, during their lifetimes, have made creative contributions of outstanding artistic significance to the field of recording"
- Country: United States
- Presented by: The Recording Academy
- First award: 1963; 63 years ago
- Website: grammy.com

The Grammy Lifetime Achievement Award is a special Grammy Award presented by The Recording Academy to "performers who, during their lifetimes, have made creative contributions of outstanding artistic significance to the field of recording."

This award is distinct from the Grammy Hall of Fame Award, which honors specific recordings rather than individuals, and the Grammy Trustees Award, which honors contributions other than performance.

The honor was established in 1962, with the first awarded recipient in 1963.

== Lifetime Achievement Award recipients ==
The following individuals have received Lifetime Achievement Awards, listed by year.

Year	Recipient	Ref.
1963	Bing Crosby	
1965	Frank Sinatra	
1966	Duke Ellington	
1967	Ella Fitzgerald	
1968	Irving Berlin	
1971	Elvis Presley	
1972	Louis Armstrong, Mahalia Jackson	
1984	Chuck Berry, Charlie Parker	
1985	Leonard Bernstein	
1986	Benny Goodman, The Rolling Stones, Andrés Segovia	
1987	Roy Acuff, Benny Carter, Enrico Caruso, Ray Charles, Fats Domino, Woody Herman, Billie Holiday, B.B. King, Isaac Stern, Igor Stravinsky, Arturo Toscanini, Hank Williams	
1989	Fred Astaire, Pablo Casals, Dizzy Gillespie, Jascha Heifetz, Lena Horne, Leontyne Price, Bessie Smith, Art Tatum, Sarah Vaughan	
1990	Nat King Cole, Miles Davis, Vladimir Horowitz, Paul McCartney	
1991	Marian Anderson, Bob Dylan, John Lennon, Kitty Wells	
1992	James Brown, John Coltrane, Jimi Hendrix, Muddy Waters	
1993	Chet Atkins, Little Richard, Thelonious Monk, Bill Monroe, Pete Seeger, Fats Waller	
1994	Bill Evans, Aretha Franklin, Arthur Rubinstein	
1995	Patsy Cline, Peggy Lee, Henry Mancini, Curtis Mayfield, Barbra Streisand	
1996	Dave Brubeck, Marvin Gaye, Georg Solti, Stevie Wonder	
1997	Bobby "Blue" Bland, The Everly Brothers, Judy Garland, Stéphane Grappelli, Buddy Holly, Charles Mingus, Oscar Peterson, Frank Zappa	
1998	Bo Diddley, The Mills Brothers, Roy Orbison, Paul Robeson	
1999	Johnny Cash, Sam Cooke, Otis Redding, Smokey Robinson, Mel Tormé	
2000	Harry Belafonte, Woody Guthrie, John Lee Hooker, Mitch Miller, Willie Nelson	
2001	The Beach Boys, Tony Bennett, Sammy Davis Jr., Bob Marley, The Who	
2002	Count Basie, Rosemary Clooney, Perry Como, Al Green, Joni Mitchell	
2003	Etta James, Johnny Mathis, Glenn Miller, Tito Puente, Simon & Garfunkel	
2004	Van Cliburn, The Funk Brothers, Ella Jenkins, Sonny Rollins, Artie Shaw, Doc Watson	
2005	Eddy Arnold, Art Blakey, The Carter Family, Morton Gould, Janis Joplin, Led Zeppelin, Jerry Lee Lewis, Jelly Roll Morton, Pinetop Perkins, The Staple Singers	
2006	David Bowie, Cream, Merle Haggard, Robert Johnson, Jessye Norman, Richard Pryor, The Weavers	
2007	Joan Baez, Booker T. & the M.G.'s, Maria Callas, Ornette Coleman, The Doors, The Grateful Dead, Bob Wills	
2008	Burt Bacharach, The Band, Cab Calloway, Doris Day, Itzhak Perlman, Max Roach, Earl Scruggs	
2009	Gene Autry, The Blind Boys of Alabama, The Four Tops, Hank Jones, Brenda Lee, Dean Martin, Tom Paxton	
2010	Leonard Cohen, Bobby Darin, David "Honeyboy" Edwards, Michael Jackson, Loretta Lynn, André Previn, Clark Terry	
2011	Julie Andrews, Roy Haynes, Juilliard String Quartet, The Kingston Trio, Dolly Parton, Ramones, George Beverly Shea	
2012	The Allman Brothers Band, Glen Campbell, Antônio Carlos Jobim, George Jones, The Memphis Horns, Diana Ross, Gil Scott-Heron	
2013	Glenn Gould, Charlie Haden, Lightnin' Hopkins, Carole King, Patti Page, Ravi Shankar, The Temptations	
2014	The Beatles, Clifton Chenier, The Isley Brothers, Kraftwerk, Kris Kristofferson, Armando Manzanero, Maud Powell	
2015	Bee Gees, Pierre Boulez, Buddy Guy, George Harrison, Flaco Jiménez, The Louvin Brothers, Wayne Shorter	
2016	Ruth Brown, Celia Cruz, Earth, Wind & Fire, Herbie Hancock, Jefferson Airplane, Linda Ronstadt, Run-DMC	
2017	Shirley Caesar, Ahmad Jamal, Charley Pride, Jimmie Rodgers, Nina Simone, Sly Stone, The Velvet Underground	
2018	Hal Blaine, Neil Diamond, Emmylou Harris, Louis Jordan, The Meters, Queen, Tina Turner	
2019	Black Sabbath, George Clinton and Parliament-Funkadelic, Billy Eckstine, Donny Hathaway, Julio Iglesias, Sam & Dave, Dionne Warwick	
2020	Chicago, Roberta Flack, Isaac Hayes, Iggy Pop, John Prine, Public Enemy, Sister Rosetta Tharpe	
2021	Grandmaster Flash and the Furious Five, Lionel Hampton, Marilyn Horne, Salt-N-Pepa, Selena, Talking Heads	
2022	Bonnie Raitt	
2023	Bobby McFerrin, Nirvana, Ma Rainey, Slick Rick, Nile Rodgers, The Supremes, Ann Wilson and Nancy Wilson of Heart	
2024	Laurie Anderson, The Clark Sisters, Gladys Knight, N.W.A, Donna Summer, Tammy Wynette	
2025	Frankie Beverly, The Clash, Bobby Jones, Taj Mahal, Prince, Roxanne Shante, Frankie Valli	
2026	Cher, Whitney Houston, Chaka Khan, Fela Kuti, Carlos Santana, Paul Simon	
