= William Bramwell Powell =

American educator, author, co-founder of National Geographic Society (1836–1904)

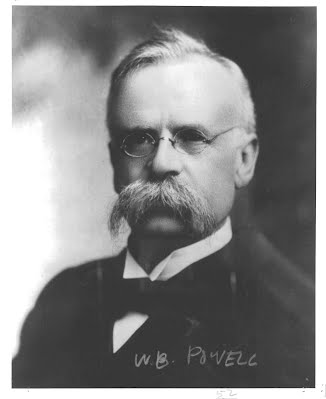
- Born: December 22, 1836; Castile, New York
- Died: February 6, 1904 (aged 67); Mt. Vernon, New York
- Known for: Co-founder of the National Geographic Society
- Spouse: Wilhelmina Bengelstraeter Paul
- Children: Maud Powell
- Parent(s): Mary Dean; Joseph Powell
- Relatives: John Wesley Powell, brother

William Bramwell Powell (December 22, 1836 – February 6, 1904) was an American educator, author and superintendent of schools who co-founded the National Geographic Society.

== Biography ==
He was born in Castile, New York, on December 22, 1836 to Mary Dean and Joseph Powell.

He spent most of his childhood in Illinois, where his father was a Methodist minister. He received degrees from Wheaton College and Lombard College, and then stayed in Illinois as a school principal. He moved to Peru, Illinois for eight years. There he married Wilhelmina Bengelstraeter Paul on May 28, 1865. The violinist Maud Powell was their daughter.

Powell spent sixteen years in Aurora, Illinois, where he was the superintendent of schools.

In 1885 he was appointed superintendent of schools in Washington DC, and in 1888 he co-founded the National Geographic Society, of which he was vice-president in 1894. He wrote several textbooks on writing, history and reading and then retired in June 1900.

He died in Mt. Vernon, New York, on February 6, 1904.

Powell Elementary School in Washington, DC is named in his honor.
