= International Composers' Guild =

Organization

The International Composers' Guild was an organization created in 1921 by Edgard Varèse and Carlos Salzedo. It was responsible for performances and premieres of works by Béla Bartók, Alban Berg, Erik Satie, Carlos Chávez, Henry Cowell, Charles Ives, Maurice Ravel, Wallingford Riegger, Francis Poulenc, and Anton von Webern, and others.

== Management of the ICG ==
The Guild was run by a Council consisting of:

- Varèse (director)
- Salzedo
- Alfredo Casella
- Acario Cotapos Baeza
- Carl Engel
- A. Walter Kramer
- Julius Mattfeld
- Karol Szymanowski
- Emerson Whithorne

However, in practice most of the work was done by Edgar and Louise Varèse and Salzedo. However following the First season Claire Raphael Reis was appointed executive secretary of the guild. Once in post she was able to relocate the second season to the Broadway based Klaw Theatre, which had a capacity of 805. After hosting the American premiere of Arnold Schoenberg's Pierrot Lunaire on 4 February 1923, she proposed staging a repeat performance, contrary to a rule of the ICG emanating from Edgard Varèse that aside from an immediate encore, no musical piece should be scheduled by the ICG twice. Later that year she motivated several members to secede from the ICG to found the League of Composers. The ICG then relocated to the broadway based Vanderbilt Theatre for the third season and to the Aeolian Hall for the last three seasons.

== The seasons ==
The ICG organised six seasons, each consisting of three concerts each.

=== First season ===
The first season was performed at the off-Broadway Greenwich Village Theatre, between 19 February and 23 April 1922.

=== Second season ===
The second season was performed at the Broadway based Klaw Theatre, and opened on 17 December 1922.

=== Third season ===
The third season was performed at the Vanderbilt Theatre.

=== Fourth season ===
The fourth season was performed at the Aeolian Hall.

=== Fifth season ===
The fifth season was also performed at the Aeolian Hall.

=== Sixth season ===
The sixth and final season continued at the Aeolian Hall.
