= Peru Elementary School District 124 =

School district in LaSalle County, Illinois, United States

Peru Public School District

Location
- LaSalle County, IL United States

District information
- Motto: "Rich Past, Bright Future"
- Grades: PK–8th
- Established: 1840; 186 years ago
- Budget: $11.1 million

Students and staff
- Students: 1,070
- Staff: 127
- District mascot: Raider

Other information
- Board of education: 7 members, elected to 4-year terms
- Website: www.perued.net

Peru Public Schools, formally named Peru Elementary School District 124, is the public school district responsible for public education below the high school level in Peru, Illinois, United States. It operates one elementary school and one middle school. The school district was established in 1840. It has a current enrollment of about 1,070 students.

== Schools ==
Each of the district's schools serve a different age group. Northview Elementary School provides pre-kindergarten through fourth grade, and Parkside School is the district's middle school, enrolling grades 5 to 8. After middle school, children in the district are zoned to attend LaSalle-Peru High School in LaSalle.

Aurora University’s College of Education uses Parkside School as a cohort site for some of its graduate-level courses.

== History ==
The Peru public school district was established in 1840. William Bramwell Powell, author of numerous books, father of violinist Maud Powell and brother of geologist John Wesley Powell, served as superintendent of Peru Elementary School District 124 from 1862 to 1870. William Powell, or Bram, as he was known, wrote several textbooks that were used in classrooms throughout the United States.

In the 1990s the district broke new ground the area of special education by successfully supplying community-based services to allow a child disabled with Tourette's syndrome to remain in his home and his local schools instead of being sent away to receive specialized educational services. In 1999, it was estimated that this approach had resulted in annual cost savings of $63,000.

=== 2007 referendum ===
A 2006 task force of community members recommended that Roosevelt Elementary School, then 83 years old, be replaced by a new facility yet to be constructed. To generate funds for the new building, the school district formed an agreement with the city of Peru to raise sales tax by half a penny, generating approximately $1.5 million in revenue. The historic referendum was supported by more than 78 percent of taxpayers.

=== New building ===
Parkside Middle School was built on a 28-acre plot of land owned by the school district. The 95,300-square-foot (8,850 m^{2}) facility is designed to accommodate 600 students within its two academic wings. Parkside also features a state-of-the-art synergistics lab.

=== Demolishing of Washington Elementary School ===
The second elementary school, Washington Elementary, was demolished in Summer 2014. The other school, Northview, was expanded, now teaching grades Pre-K through 4th.
