= A. Walter Kramer =

American publisher, editor, critic, and composer

Arthur Walter Kramer (23 September 1890, New York City – 8 April 1969, New York City) was an American music critic, music publisher, and composer.

He was taught music by his father and took violin lessons from Carl Hauser and Richard Arnold. He attended the College of the City of New York graduating in 1910.

== Compositions ==
Kramer served on the Council of the International Composers' Guild (ICG). He performed his composition for piano, Interlude for a Drama at the second concert organised by the ICG at the Greenwich Village Theatre on 19 March 1922.

== Criticism ==
From 1910 to 1922 Kramer was a contributor to Musical America. From 1929 to 1936, he was the editor of the journal.
