= The Maud Powell Signature, Women in Music =

Online music periodical

The Maud Powell Signature Women in Music
- Editor: Pamela J. Blevins; Managing Editor
- Staff writers: Karen A. Shaffer; Associate Editor
- Categories: Music magazine
- First issue: Summer 1995
- Company: The Maud Powell Society for Music and Education
- Based in: Brevard, North Carolina
- Language: English
- Website: Signature
- ISSN: 1083-5954

The Maud Powell Signature, Women in Music, also known as Signature, is an American online music periodical. It is published free of charge by The Maud Powell Society for Music and Education, a non-profit charity Section 501(c)(3) organization founded in 1986 and based in Brevard, North Carolina. Signature launched in 1995 as a quarterly print subscription magazine, publishing five editions through 1997. After a nine-year hiatus due to a lack of funding, the editors resurrected the publication with a much lower overhead, distributing issues free online in pdf.

The overarching topics relate to women in classical music, historic and current. The contributing editors are music scholars, music critics, and music educators. Submissions and acceptances are neither juried nor solicited nor peer-reviewed by outside scholars; although the managing editor, Pamela J. Blevins and associate editor, Karen A. Shaffer, both music scholars, weigh the veracity and worthiness themselves. The published submissions range from seminal research to dissertation spin-offs to editorials to biography supplements to general articles about forgotten or overlooked women, especially composers, who made, or are now making, important contributions to music.

== Founders and editors ==
Signature was co-founded by (i) Pamela J. Blevins (born 1945), who is managing editor, and (ii) Karen A. Shaffer (born 1947), who is Director, President, and CEO of The Maud Powell Society for Music and Education, and Associate Editor of the publication. Shaffer is an author and scholar on Maud Powell.

== Publication's namesake ==
Maud Powell (1867–1920) was regarded by American and European critics as the foremost woman violinist in the world, and, at her death, one of the greatest musicians ever produced by the United States, and the first violinist from the United States to achieve international rank. In 1904, Powell became the first solo instrumentalist to record for the Victor Talking Machine Company’s celebrity artist series, Red Seal label. Those recordings became worldwide bestsellers.

== Editions ==
Print editions

- Summer 1995, Vol. I, No. 1
  Pioneering Spirit of Women in Music
- Fall 1995, Vol. I, No. 2
  Family Traditions
- Winter 1996, Vol. I, No. 3
  Women and Orchestras, Part 1
- Spring/Summer 1996, Vol. I, No. 4
  Women and Orchestras, Part 2
- April 1997, Vol. II, No. 1
  Women of Vision

Online editions

- June 2008, Vol. II, No. 2
  The March of the Women
- Autumn 2008, Vol. II, No. 3
  Lost and Found
- Spring 2009, Vol. II, No. 4
  Educators
- Summer 2010, Vol. III, No. 1
- Spring/Summer 2011, Vol. III, No. 2
