= Minna Lederman =

Minna Lederman Daniel (3 March 1896 – 29 October 1995) was a music writer and editor of the magazine Modern Music for more than 20 years.

== Life ==
Lederman was born in Manhattan and studied music, dance and drama as a child. She graduated from Barnard College in 1917 and married painter Mell Daniel, who died in 1975.

In 1923, Lederman helped found the League of Composers in New York City, and saw the need for a music review magazine. The first issue was published in February 1924, originally called The League of Composers' Review. In 1925, the name was changed to Modern Music, and publication continued until 1946. It featured and reviewed dance, concert music, musical theater, jazz, film and radio music performances in Europe, Latin America and the United States, but concentrated on serious coverage of new American music.

A number of composers wrote for the magazine, including Aaron Copland, Virgil Thomson, Elliott Carter, Leonard Bernstein, John Cage, Marc Blitzstein and Roger Sessions. European composers were also featured, including Alban Berg, Arnold Schoenberg and Béla Bartók. Music critic Edwin Denby was also a regular contributor.

Because of the importance of the magazine, Lederman maintained considerable influence in shaping pre-World War II American music, perhaps more than any single composer. After the magazine closed, Lederman continued to write on dance and music. She edited the Stravinsky in the Theater anthology published in 1947 and contributed to magazines including Saturday Review, The American Mercury, The Nation and others.

In 1974, she was instrumental in establishing the Archives of Modern Music in the Library of Congress, and in 1983, she edited The Life and Death of a Small Magazine published by the Institute for Studies in American Music, a compilation of articles written for Modern Music united by Lederman's commentary. In 1984, the compilation won the ASCAP Deems Taylor Award for distinguished music criticism.

Lederman died in Manhattan at age 99.
