= Claire Raphael Reis =

American music promoter

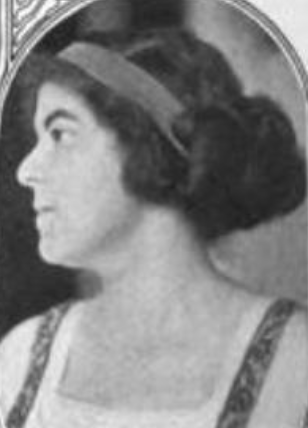
- Claire Raphael, from a 1915 publication
- Born: August 4, 1888; Brownsville, Texas
- Died: April 11, 1978 (aged 89); New York, New York
- Occupations: Music educator, promoter, writer

Claire Raphael Reis (August 4, 1888 – April 11, 1978) was a music promoter and the founder of the People's Music League in New York City. The League was intended to provide free concerts for immigrants and public schools.

Born Claire Raphael in Brownsville, Texas, Claire married businessman Arthur M. Reis in 1915. She was educated in Europe and New York City. She received a teaching credential and began teaching music in New York schools, using the Montessori method. In 1914, she helped to found the Walden School.

In 1922, Louis Gruenberg suggested that Claire Reis become the executive secretary of the International Composers' Guild. The guild had organized its first season at the off-broadway Greenwich Village Theatre, which seated 450 people. Once in the post, she was able to relocate the second season to the Broadway based Klaw Theatre, which had a capacity of 805. After hosting the American premiere of Arnold Schoenberg's Pierrot Lunaire on 4 February 1923, she proposed staging a repeat performance, contrary to a rule of the ICG emanating from Edgard Varese that aside from an immediate encore, no musical piece should be scheduled by the ICG twice. Later that year she motivated several members to secede from the ICG to found the League of Composers. She then served as the league's president for twenty-five years. During this time she promoted many concerts and commissioned many works. One of her protégés was Aaron Copland.

Reis was a prolific author of many articles on music, two catalogs for the International Society for Contemporary Music, and the books Composers, Conductors and Critics in 1955 and Composers in America: Biographical Sketches in 1938; the latter is a valuable reference work which appeared in a second, enlarged edition in 1947 and was republished in 1977.

Reis served on the board of directors of the New York City Center of Music and Drama. She also helped to found the Women's City Club and was a member of the board of the Work Projects Administration. She was on the advisory board for music of the 1939 World's Fair.

In 1969, Reis was awarded the Handel Medallion by the City of New York for her contributions to the city's cultural life.
