= League of Composers =

The League of Composers/International Society for Contemporary Music is a society whose stated mission is "to produce the highest quality performances of new music, to champion American composers in the United States and abroad, and to introduce American audiences to the best new music from around the world." It was founded in New York City in 1923 by Claire Reis, Louis Gruenberg, Alma Wertheim, Lazare Saminsky, Leo Ornstein, Emerson Whithorne, Frederick Jacobi, Stephen Bourgeois, and Minna Lederman, when they seceded from the International Composers Guild. In 1954, the League of Composers became the US chapter of the International Society of Contemporary Music (ISCM) and has since been known as the League of Composers/ISCM.

The League draws on a rich history, including such premieres as Schönberg's Die Glückliche Hand, Béla Bartók's Village Scenes, Samuel Barber’s Piano Sonata and Anton Webern’s Symphony (for chamber orchestra). The League also sponsored the American premiere of Igor Stravinsky’s ballet, Le Sacre du Printemps, many pieces by Aaron Copland, György Ligeti’s Horn Trio, Karlheinz Stockhausen’s Harlequin, and many works by former honorary Board Co-Chairs Elliott Carter and Milton Babbitt.

During the League's early years, prominent composers such as Samuel Barber, Leonard Bernstein, Aaron Copland, Henry Cowell, Paul Hindemith, Serge Koussevitzky, Darius Milhaud, Roger Sessions, and many others served on the Board of Directors, as president, and/or as chair of the board.

It also sponsors an annual composers competition. Friedrich Heinrich Kern serves as its current president.

== Sources ==
- Oja, Carol J., Making Music Modern, Oxford University Press US, 2000. ISBN 0-19-505849-6
