= Maud Powell =

American musician (1867–1920)

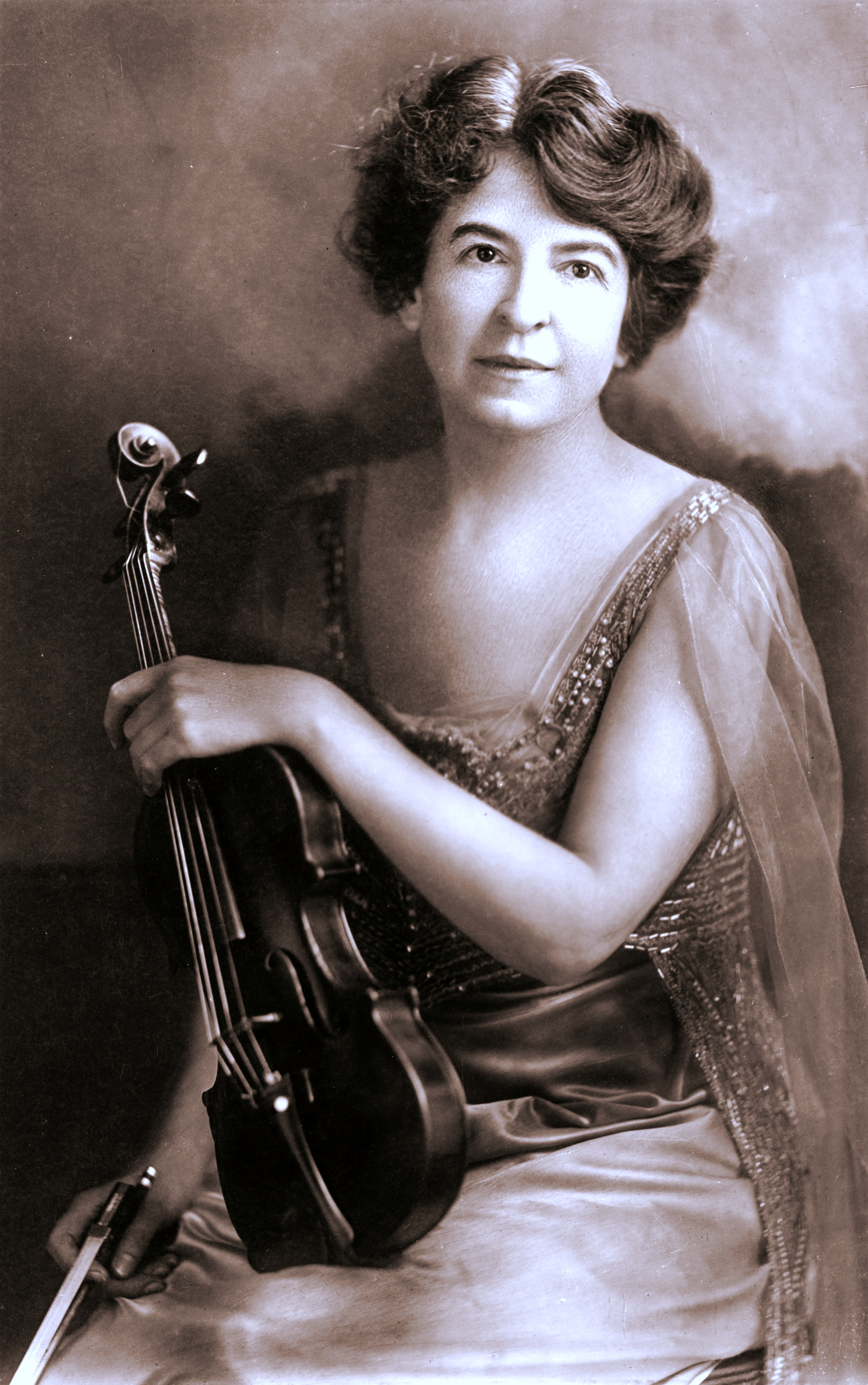
- Powell circa 1919
- Born: Minnie Powell; August 22, 1867; Peru, Illinois
- Died: January 8, 1920 (aged 52); Uniontown, Pennsylvania
- Parent(s): William Bramwell Powell and Wilhelmina Bengelstraeter
- Relatives: John Wesley Powell, uncle

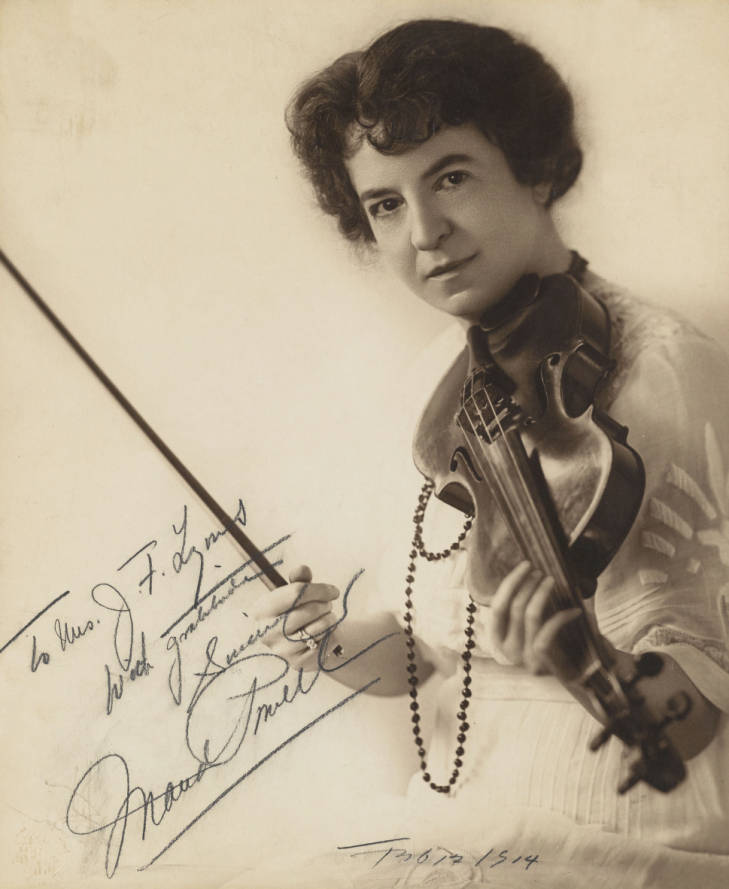
1914 publicity photo of Maud Powell.

Minnie "Maud" Powell (August 22, 1867 – January 8, 1920) was an American violinist who gained international acclaim for her skill and virtuosity.

== Biography ==
Powell was born in Peru, Illinois. Her mother was Wilhelmina "Minnie" Bengelstraeter Powell, and her father was William Bramwell Powell. W. B. Powell wrote numerous books such as The Normal Course of Reading and served as superintendent of Peru Elementary School District 124 from 1862 to 1870. She was the niece of John Wesley Powell, an American Civil War hero and famed explorer of the Grand Canyon. He made his first scientific exploration of the Colorado River in 1869, when Maud was two years old.

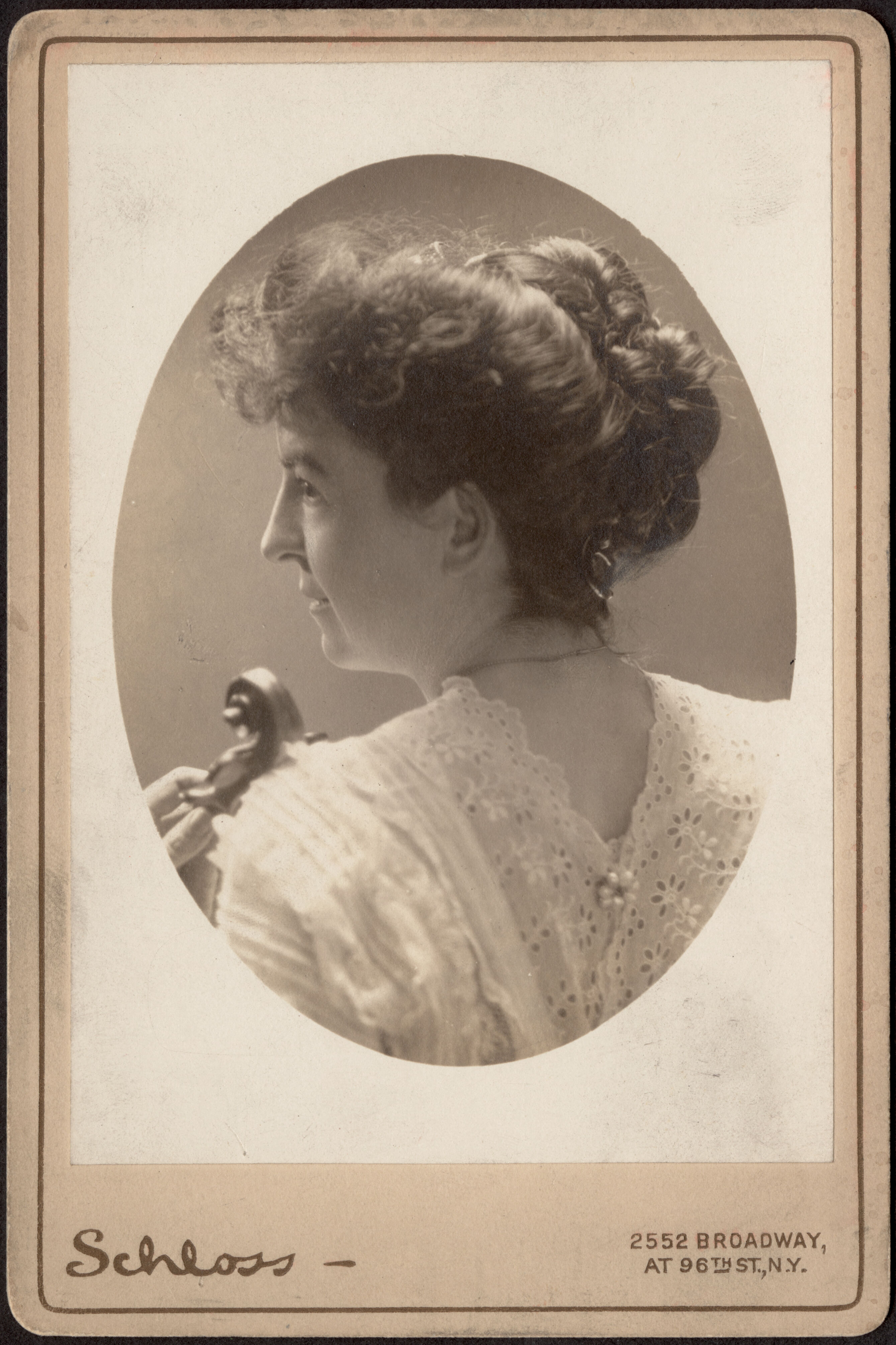
Maud Powell, ca. 1887-1911; from the Philip Hale Collection of the Boston Public Library

Around the age of 7, she began violin and piano lessons in Aurora, located in Kane County, Illinois, a western suburb of Chicago. She was soon recognized as a prodigy and at age 9 began four years of being taken to Chicago for piano study with Agnes Ingersoll and violin study with William Lewis. When she was 13, her parents sold the family home to raise funds to continue her musical education. With her father remaining behind in rented rooms, she traveled with her mother and younger brother William to Europe. There she studied under Henry Schradieck at the Leipzig Conservatoire, Charles Dancla at the Paris Conservatoire (after placing first in the entrance exam), and Joseph Joachim at the Berlin Hochschule, among others. In 1885 she played Bruch's G minor concerto in her debut with the Berlin Philharmonic under Joachim's baton, and again with the New York Philharmonic under Theodore Thomas after she returned to the United States.

Powell was soloist in the first American performances of the Tchaikovsky and Sibelius violin concertos and performed Dvořák's Violin Concerto on April 7, 1894, with the New York Philharmonic under the baton of Anton Seidl in Carnegie Hall under the supervision of the composer. Powell was a powerful advocate for music by Americans, women, and black composers, including the British composer Samuel Coleridge-Taylor, from whom she commissioned a violin concerto. Powell was a committed champion of the Sibelius Violin Concerto and was largely responsible for its addition to the repertoire. Max Liebling's Fantasia on Sousa Themes for violin and piano was dedicated to her.

In January 1894, Powell was initiated honorably into musical women's fraternity Alpha Chi Omega.

On October 31, 1916, Powell performed in Ottawa, Illinois, on the occasion of the dedication of the Ottawa High School building.

On November 27, 1919, Powell suffered a heart attack on stage in St. Louis, Missouri. On January 8, 1920, Powell died following another heart attack in Uniontown, Pennsylvania while on tour.

== Legacy ==
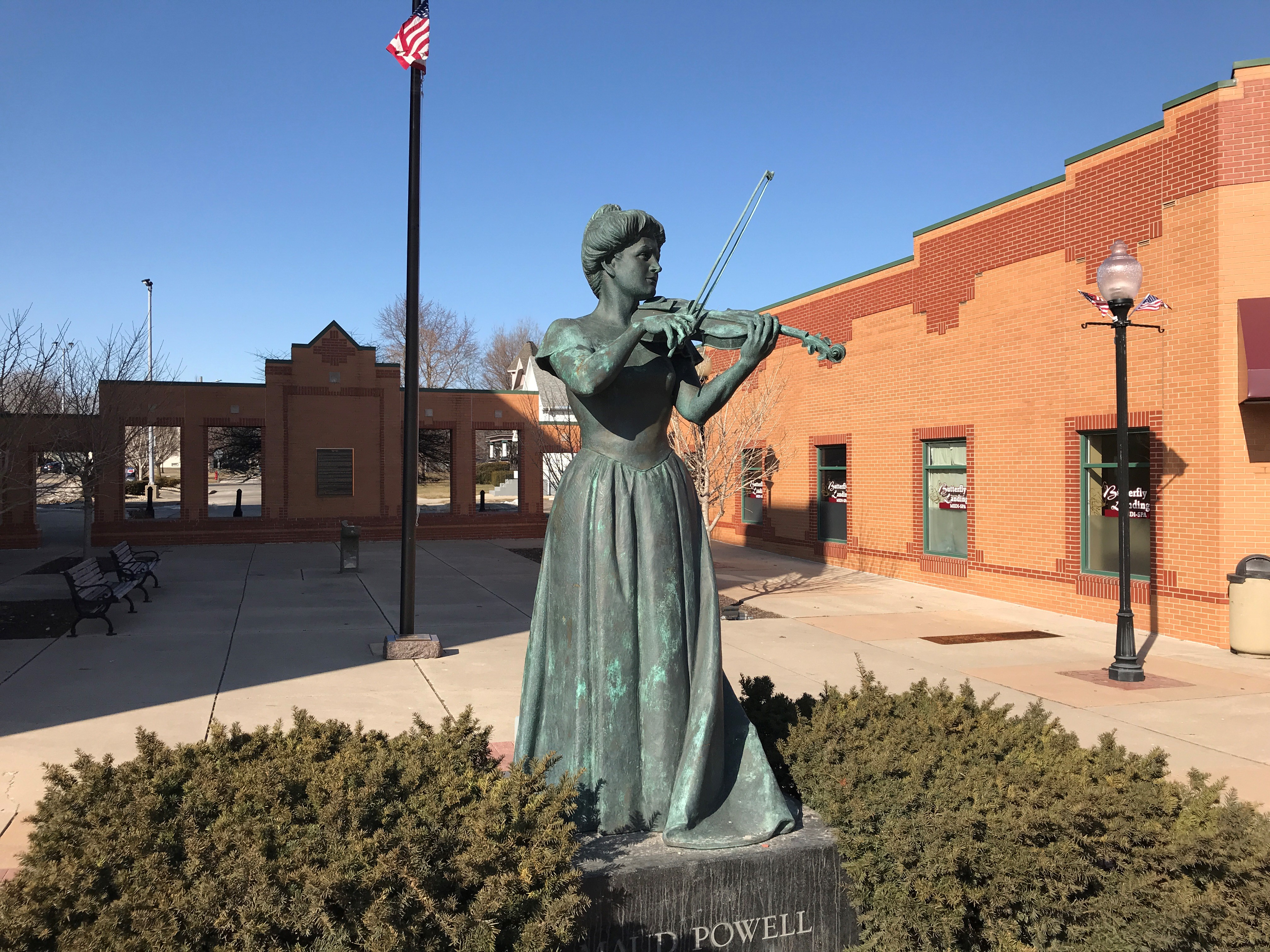
Statue of violinist Maud Powell in Peru, Illinois.

Powell was the first American violinist to achieve international rank. She was among the first instrumentalists to make Red Seal records for the Victor Talking Machine Company, starting in 1904 until 1919. With these recordings she set an enduring standard for violin performance.

In 1986, Powell's biographer Karen A. Shaffer founded the Maud Powell Society for Music and Education to further knowledge of Powell and her significant role in music both in the United States and abroad.

In 1995, her home town of Peru dedicated an 8-foot bronze statue of Powell, sculpted by Joseph Heyd.

In 2007, American violinist Rachel Barton Pine released a CD of music transcribed by, commissioned by or dedicated to Maud Powell.

In 2009, Maud Powell Favorites, a 4-volume set of Powell's transcriptions and works commissioned by her or dedicated to her was published by the Maud Powell Society for Music and Education. The music was compiled by Karen A. Shaffer who wrote the extensive historical introduction and annotations while Rachel Barton Pine served as the music editor.

Maud Powell was posthumously granted the Grammy Lifetime Achievement Award on January 25, 2014, at the Recording Academy's 2014 Special Merit Awards Ceremony & Nominees Reception. The award was accepted on behalf of Powell by biographer Karen A. Shaffer and Rachel Barton Pine.

== Recordings ==
- American Virtuosa: Tribute to Maud Powell. Rachel Barton Pine (violin), Matthew Hagle (piano). Cedille Records, 2006: CDR 90000 097
- Powell, Maud: Complete Recordings, Vol. 1 (1904–1917). Naxos Records, 2001: 8.110961
- Powell, Maud: Complete Recordings, Vol. 2 (1904–1917). Naxos Records, 2001: 8.110962
- Powell, Maud: Complete Recordings, Vol. 3 (1904–1917). Naxos Records, 2001: 8.110963
- Powell, Maud: Complete Recordings, Vol. 4 (1904–1917). Naxos Records, 2004: 8.110993

== See also ==
- The Maud Powell Signature, Women in Music, an online music periodical
