= Greenwich Village Theatre =

Theater in New York City (1917–1930)

Coordinates: 40°44′1.5″N 74°0′11″W

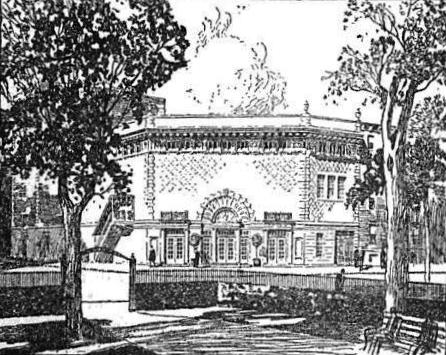
- Interactive map of Greenwich Village Theatre
- Address: 220 W. 4th Street; Manhattan, New York; United States
- Capacity: 450

Construction
- Opened: November 15, 1917
- Demolished: 1930
- Architect: Herman Lee Meader

Greenwich Village Theatre (GVT) was an arts venue in Greenwich Village, New York which opened in 1917 and closed for the last time in 1930. Herman Lee Meader was the architect and it was located in Sheridan Square at 4th Street and Seventh Avenue. It was an intimate theatre that seated 450, and is no longer extant. It was originally built for Frank Conroy's Greenwich Village Players.

The Greenwich Village Follies of 1919 premiered at the GVT on July 15, 1919. It became "the first Off-Broadway musical to gain wide recognition in New York". The theatre was also the venue for the first series of performances organised by the International Composers' Guild between 19 February and 23 April 1922. The ICG moved on to the Klaw Theatre for their second season.
