= Brod =

Brod may refer to:

== People ==
- Brod (surname), includes a list of people with the name
- Brod Bagert, American writer
- Brod Veillon, assistant adjutant general-air for Louisiana

== Places ==
=== Bosnia and Herzegovina ===
- Brod, Bosnia and Herzegovina (formerly Bosanski/Srpski Brod), a town and municipality
- Brod, Brčko, a village in Brčko District
- Brod, Foča, a village in the municipality of Foča, Republika Srpska
- Martin Brod, a village in the municipality of Bihać
- Šićki Brod, a village in the municipality of Tuzla

=== Bulgaria ===
- Beli Brod, a village in Montana Province
- Brod, Haskovo Province, a village
- Kostinbrod, a town in Sofia Province
- Tsarev Brod, a village in Shumen Province

=== Croatia ===
- Slavonski Brod, a city in Brod-Posavina County
- Brod Moravice, a village and municipality in Gorski Kotar
- Brod na Kupi, a village near Delnice in Gorski Kotar
- Bubnjarački Brod, a village in Žakanje municipality
- Jurovski Brod, a village in Žakanje municipality
- Stari Brod, a village in Sisak-Moslavina County

=== Czech Republic ===
- Brod, a village and part of Heřmanice (Náchod District) in the Hradec Králové Region
- Brod, a village and part of Kolinec in the Plzeň Region
- Brod, a village and part of Petrovice (Příbram District) in the Central Bohemian Region
- Brod, a village and part of Příbram in the Central Bohemian Region
- Brod nad Dyjí, a municipality and village in the South Moravian Region
- Brod nad Tichou, a municipality and village in the Plzeň Region
- Český Brod, a town in the Central Bohemian Region
- Havlíčkův Brod (formerly Německý Brod), a town in the Vysočina Region
- Uherský Brod, a town in the Zlín Region
- Vyšší Brod, a town in the South Bohemian Region
- Železný Brod, a town in the Liberec Region

=== Poland ===
- Bród, Garwolin County, a village in Masovian Voivodeship
- Bród, Radom County, a village in Masovian Voivodeship
- Bród, West Pomeranian Voivodeship, a village

=== Russia ===
- Brod, Beryozovsky District, Perm Krai, a rural locality
- Brod, Chernushinsky District, Perm Krai, a rural locality
- Brod, Cherepovetsky District, Vologda Oblast, a rural locality

=== Slovakia ===
- Čierny Brod, a municipality and village in the Trnava Region
- Kráľov Brod, a municipality and village in the Trnava Region
- Krásny Brod, a municipality and village in the Prešov Region

=== Slovenia ===
- Brod, Bohinj, a village
- Brod, Novo Mesto, a former village now part of the city
- Brod (Črnuče District), a former village in Ljubljana
- Brod (Šentvid District), a former village in Ljubljana
- Brod v Podbočju, a village in the Municipality of Krško
- Hrvaški Brod, a village in the Municipality of Šentjernej
- Glogov Brod, a village in the Municipality of Brežice

=== Elsewhere ===
- Brod, Dragaš, a village in Dragaš, Kosovo
- Brod, Štrpce, a village in Štrpce, Kosovo
- Makedonski Brod, a town and municipality in North Macedonia
- Goveđi Brod, an urban neighborhood of Belgrade, Serbia
- Brod (Crna Trava), a village in the municipality of Crna Trava, Serbia
- Brody, Ukraine
- Trochenbrod, a village in Ukraine

== Other uses ==
- Radio Brod, a radio station from Brod, Bosnia and Herzegovina

== See also ==
- Broda (disambiguation)
- Brode (disambiguation)
- Braude (disambiguation)
