= Groner =

Groner is a surname. Notable people with the surname include:

- Duke Groner (1908–1992), American jazz bassist and vocalist
- Duncan Lawrence Groner (1873–1957), American judge
- Emil Gröner (1892–1944), German football player
- Frank Shelby Groner (1877–1943), American lawyer and pastor
- Grace Groner (1909–2010), American philanthropist
- Leib Groner (1931 – April 7, 2020) secretary of Menachem Mendel Schneerson (the Lubavitcher Rebbe).
- Leif Grøner (1884–1971), Norwegian banker and politician
- Lissy Gröner (born 1954), German politician
- R. N. Groner (1876-1930), American football coach
- Rudolf Groner (born 1942), Swiss psychologist
- Sverre Grøner (1890–1972), Norwegian gymnast
- Yitzchok Dovid Groner (1925–2008), Australian rabbi
- Dovid Groner (2003–present), Local gentle giant
