= Brod (surname) =

Brod is a surname. Notable people with the surname include:

- Alexander Brod (born 1969), Jewish-Russian human rights activist
- Christian Brod (1917–2012), German painter
- Fritzi Brod (1900–1952), American artist
- Harry Brod (1951–2017), American academic and gender studies scholar
- Henri Brod (1799–1839), French oboist, instrument builder and composer of the early Romantic Era
- Jack Brod (1909–2008), American businessman and innovator
- Laura Brod (born 1971), American politician
- Max Brod (1884–1968), German-speaking Czech Jewish, later Israeli, author, composer, and journalist
- Menachem Brod (born 1959), Israeli rabbi
- Sid Brod (1899–1955), American assistant director
- Toman Brod (1929–2026), Czech historian and Holocaust survivor
