= FK Čierny Brod =

Slovak football club

- Full name: FK Čierny Brod
- Founded: 1926
- Ground: Štadión Čierny Brod, Čierny Brod
- Chairman: -
- Manager: -
- League: 5. liga
- 2010-11: 15th (relegated)

FK Čierny Brod is a Slovak football team, based in the town of Čierny Brod. The club was founded in 1926.
