= Beth Rivkah Ladies College =

Chabad school

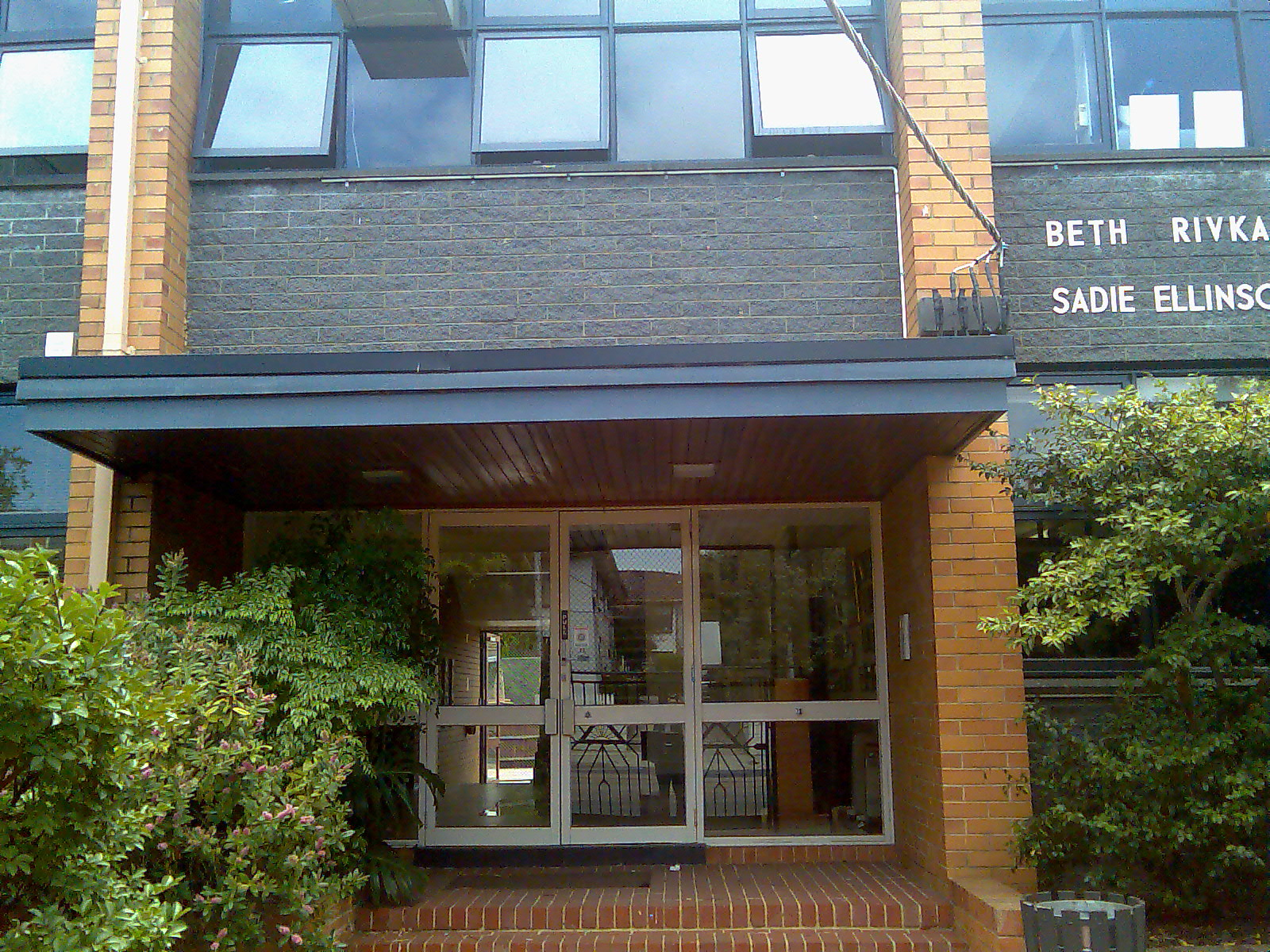
- The main entrance to the high school

Location
- East St Kilda, Melbourne, Victoria; Australia; 37°52′10″S 145°00′03″E

Information
- Type: comprehensive single-sex primary and secondary day school
- Denomination: Orthodox Jewish
- Established: 1956; 70 years ago
- Oversight: Yeshivah Centre, Melbourne
- Years: Kindergarten to Year 12
- Colours: Navy blue and yellow
- Slogan: Educating for life
- Website: ybr.vic.edu.au

Beth Rivkah Ladies College or Beth Rivkah Lubavitch is an Orthodox Jewish, comprehensive, primary and secondary day school for girls, located on Balaclava Road, East St Kilda in Melbourne, Australia.

Established in 1956 and managed by the Chabad-Lubavitch movement's Yeshivah Centre, it goes from kindergarten to Year 12. Most of its students come from non-Chabad families.

In 2017, the school had the distinction of having the Chief Rabbi of Israel come and address students. Rabbi David Lau was visiting Melbourne on his Australia tour.

Shimon Waronker became the principal in 2020.

== See also ==
- Torah study
