= Veillon =

Veillon is a surname. Notable people with the surname include:

- Auguste Veillon (1834–1890), Swiss painter
- Brod Veillon (born c. 1950), United States Air Force general
