= Leib Groner =

American rabbi

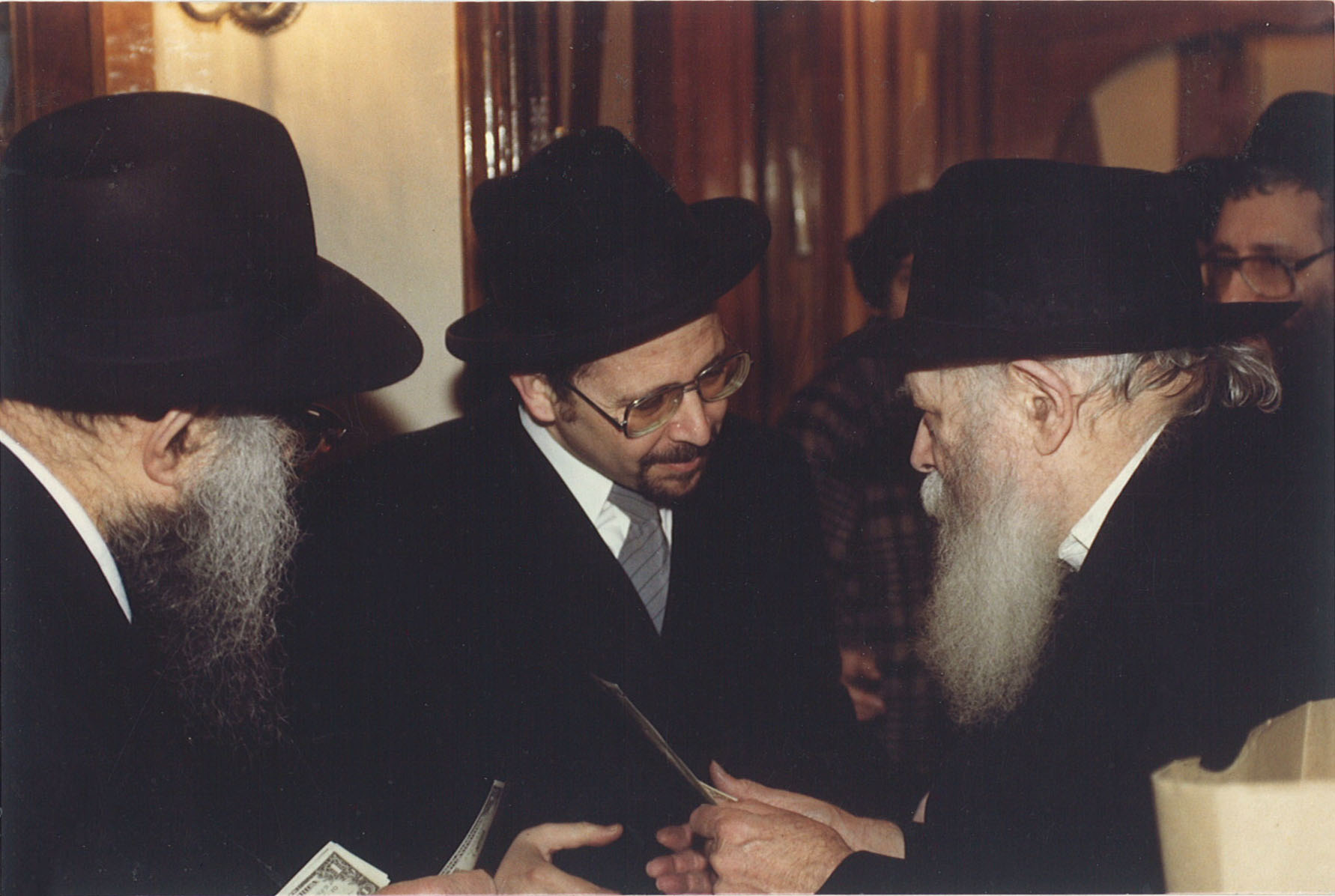
- Groner (left, back turned) with the Lubavitcher Rebbe (right) during the distribution of dollars
- Born: Yehuda Leib Groner; April 25, 1931; New York City, New York
- Died: April 7, 2020 (aged 88); New York City
- Occupation: Personal secretary to the Lubavitcher Rebbe
- Years active: 1949 - 1994
- Spouse: Yehudis Gurewytz
- Children: 7

Yehuda Leib "Leibel" Groner (Yiddish: יהודה ליב גראנער; April 25, 1931 – April 7, 2020) was an American Hasidic Jewish teacher, scholar, and author. He is best known for having served as the personal secretary to Rabbi Menachem Mendel Schneerson, the seventh Lubavitcher Rebbe, for 40 years.

== Early life and education ==
Yehuda Leib Groner was born in New York City on April 25, 1931. His parents were Rabbi Mordechai Avrohom Yeshaya Groner and Menucha Rochel Groner. His brother, Rabbi Yitzchok Dovid Groner, became the most senior Chabad rabbi in Melbourne, Australia, and the director of the Yeshivah Centre there. Groner was a direct descendant of Shneur Zalman of Liadi, the founding Rebbe of Chabad-Lubavitch.

Groner studied at the Central Yeshiva Tomchei Temimim Lubavitch at 770 Eastern Parkway in Crown Heights, Brooklyn, where he excelled as a student. He often spoke with Menachem Mendel Schneerson, the future Lubavitcher Rebbe, and had an office in the building. Groner's connection to Schneerson began at Groner's bar mitzvah celebration, where Schneerson spoke for 1 hour and 20 minutes. In 1949, Schneerson asked Groner to join the team of Merkos L'Inyonei Chinuch, working in the Kehot Publication Society, thus adding Groner to his secretariat.

== Secretary to the Lubavitcher Rebbe ==
In 1951, Schneerson succeeded his father-in-law as the seventh Rebbe of Chabad-Lubavitch. After Groner married in 1954, Schneerson asked him to become his personal assistant. On April 13, 1984, Schneerson referred to Groner as "my general." Groner controlled access to Schneerson, and vied for power with Schneerson's chauffeur and spokesman, Rabbi Yehuda Krinsky. After Schneerson's death in 1994 he became a public speaker.

== Writing and teaching ==
Groner is a co-author, with Rabbi Volf Greenglass of Montreal, of Sefer HaMinhagim, the authoritative book describing Chabad-Lubavitch customs. He was also an editor of Otzar HaChasidim, the editorial group that publishes works on Chabad Hasidut. He taught at Beth Rivkah in Crown Heights, a school for girls who are part of the Chabad-Lubavitch community.

== Political views ==
Groner was associated with a number of right-wing campaigns. In 2005 he was part of a delegation along with Menachem Brod who had a "heated debate" with Israeli prime minister Ariel Sharon, pleading with him to not give away land, something he believed the nation of Israel would soon regret. He was also a strong figure in the Messianic sect of Chabad.

== Personal life ==
In 1954, Groner married Yehudis Gurewytz. The couple had three sons and four daughters. Their son Rabbi Yosef Yitzchak Groner is the rabbi of Congregation Ohr HaTorah in Charlotte, North Carolina, while another son, Rabbi Menachem Mendel Groner, is a Rosh Yeshiva at the Chabad Yeshiva in Kiryat Gat, Israel.

Groner died on April 7, 2020, aged 88, after being infected with COVID-19 for several weeks. Due to the ongoing pandemic, the funeral took place in a more muted fashion with social distancing procedures in place. The Rabbinical Alliance of America released a statement mourning Groner as "one of the most prominent figures in Lubavitch of the last generation".
