= Šićki Brod =

- Village
- Location within Bosnia and Herzegovina
- Coordinates: 44.5212485°N 18.5837173°E
- Country: Bosnia and Herzegovina
- Entity: Federation of Bosnia and Herzegovina
- Canton: Tuzla
- Municipality: Tuzla

Area
  - Total: 0.41 sq mi (1.06 km^{2})

Population (2013)
  - Total: 1,315
  - Density: 3,210/sq mi (1,240/km^{2})
- Time zone: UTC+1 (CET)
  - Summer (DST): UTC+2 (CEST)

Šićki Brod is a village in the municipality of Tuzla, Tuzla Canton, Bosnia and Herzegovina.

== Demographics ==
According to the 2013 census, its population was 1,315.

Ethnicity in 2013
Ethnicity	Number	Percentage
Bosniaks	1,026	78.0%
Croats	107	8.1%
Serbs	28	2.1%
other/undeclared	154	11.7%
Total	1,315	100%
