= Brod, Novo Mesto =

Brod
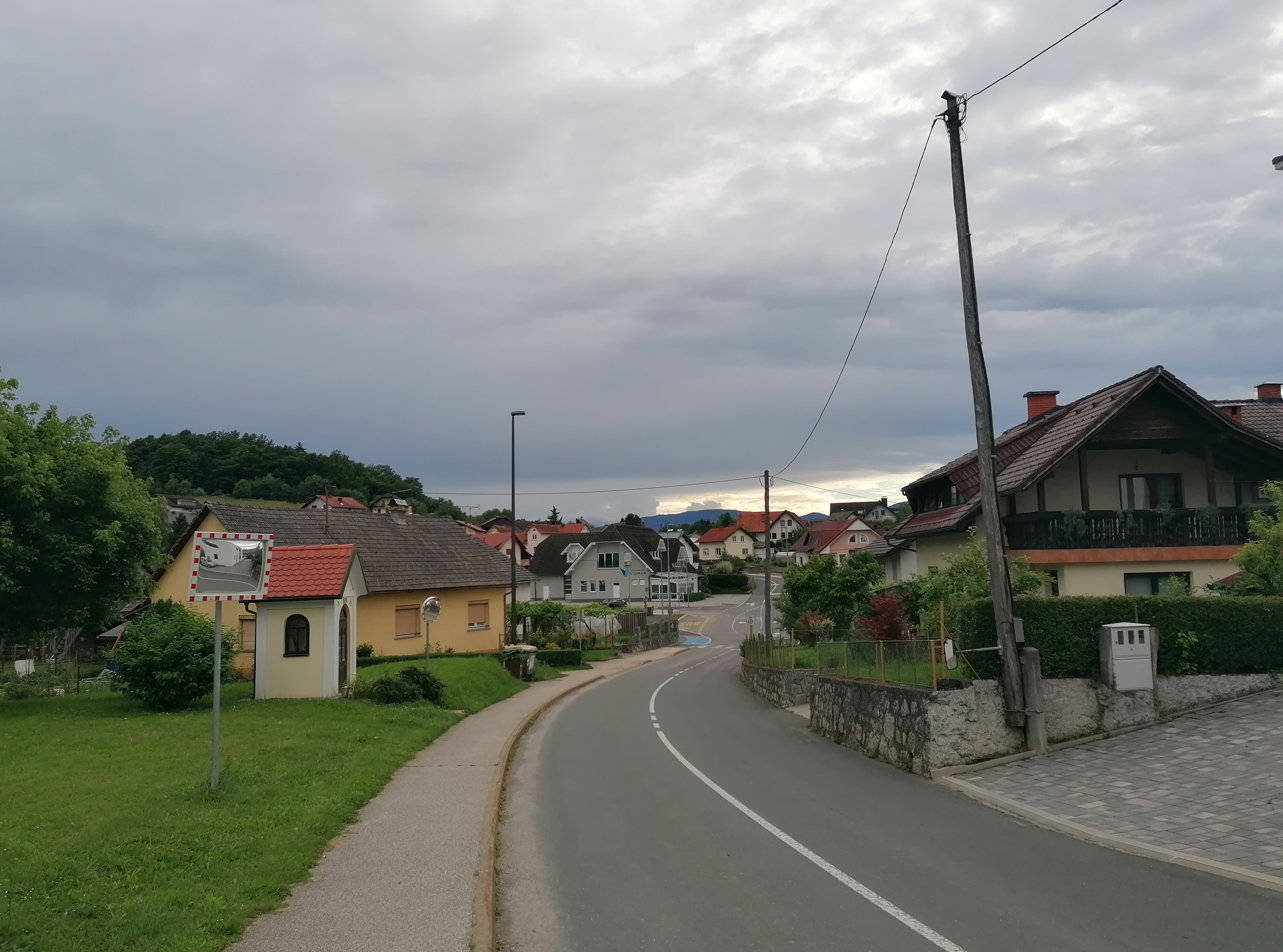

- Location in Slovenia
- Coordinates: 45°47′53″N 15°09′08″E
- Country: Slovenia
- Traditional region: Lower Carniola
- Statistical region: Southwest Slovenia
- Municipality: Novo Mesto
- Elevation: 185 m (607 ft)

Brod (pronounced [ˈbɾoːt]) is a former village in southeastern Slovenia in the Municipality of Novo Mesto. It is now part of the city of Novo Mesto. It is part of the traditional region of Lower Carniola and is now included in the Southeast Slovenia Statistical Region.

== Geography ==
Brod is a partially scattered settlement southwest of the town center of Novo Mesto. It lies in a basin along the road from Novo Mesto to Dolenjske Toplice and extends toward the Krka River. It includes the hamlets of Brezovec and Leščevje. It is bounded by the Portovald Woods, Brod Woods (Slovene: Brojski gozd or Brodski gozd), Šmihel Woods (Šmihelski gozd), Škrjanče Woods (Škrjanški gozd), and Boričevo Woods (Boričevski gozd). Water flows through Rupa Cave, a karst cave in the Brod Woods, and Brod Spring (Brojski studenec) lies near the Krka River.

== Name ==
Brod was attested in historical sources as Vruaͤr in 1362, Vrfar in 1377, Altenfurt in 1436, and Fuert in 1477, among other variations. The name Brod is derived from the Slovene common noun brod 'ferry', referring to a place where the Sava River was crossed. The village was the location of the ferry that served as the main crossing point on the Krka River in this area before Novo Mesto was founded in 1365.

== History ==
Several Roman graves have been excavated near Brod, testifying to early settlement of the area. Much of the village burned in a fire in 1915. During the Second World War, there were engagements between Italian and Partisan forces in Brod, as well as between German and Slovene Home Guard forces and the Partisans. A German defensive bunker is preserved east of the village, along the road between Brod and Drska.

Brod had a population of 112 in 23 houses in 1870, 190 in 37 houses in 1900, 189 in 36 houses in 1931, and 178 in 45 houses in 1961. Brod was annexed by the city of Novo Mesto in 1979, ending its existence as an independent settlement.

== Notable people ==
Notable people that were born or lived in Brod include the following:

- Jožef Meglič (1855–1898), poet
