= Jack Brod =

American businessman

- Born: Irven Brod; November 29, 1909; Newnan, Georgia, U.S.
- Died: January 6, 2008 (aged 98); Manhattan, New York
- Occupation: Businessman

Irven "Jack" Brod (November 29, 1909 – January 6, 2008) was an American businessman and innovator. He was the President of Empire Diamond and Gold Buying Service, a New York City-based jewelry business, which he established with his father in the Empire State Building two months after its opening in 1931. Brod was a tenant of the Empire State Building for around 77 years, and was the last remaining original tenant at the time of his death.

== Early life ==
Brod was born in Newnan, Georgia, to parents who emigrated from Russia and changed their last name from "Brodsky". Brod attended the University of Alabama, although he did not continue his studies after moving to New York City with his family prior to graduation. Before partnering with his father, Alexander, in leading the Empire Diamond and Gold Buying Service, Brod was employed as a private investigator, among other professions.

During World War II, after forming the business in New York, Brod served in the Army Air Corps as a corporal. He was assigned by the Corps to England, where he loaded bombs into aircraft. During his assignment, he purchased rare antiques and collectibles from the formerly wealthy owners of English houses who had suffered due to the war and the Great Depression. Brod shipped the items back to the United States by boat for sale and private collection.

== Professional career ==
The Empire State Building was opened by U.S. President Herbert Hoover on May 1, 1931. Two months later, on July 1, 1931, Brod and his father moved into the seventh floor and established what became the Empire Diamond and Gold Buying Service (commonly known as Empire Diamond), making use of the name of the building it occupied for radio advertising purposes. The first office was 400 square feet (37 m^{2}) in area, and at the time of the establishment of the business, work was still being completed on the interior of the building in the lobby and the upper parts of the tower.

Following his duties in the Army Air Corps during World War II, Brod returned to his business. He innovated, producing new ideas including one of the earliest jewelry catalogs and a toll-free telephone service for diamond orders. During Brod's life, his business moved locations within the tower, moving up as the business succeeded. His company moved up to the 14th floor, before relocating to the 15th and then the 66th. During 2001, Brod invested in another move—to the 76th floor—which was the final before his death in 2008.

Brod was, as of 2008, the longest-ever tenant of the Empire State Building, and was also the last of the original tenants to end tenancy in the building (either through death or relocation to another site).

== Personal life ==
Brod had an interest in boating, and sailed well into his 80s. He owned a boatyard on City Island in the Bronx, and also owned a boat production factory in Newfoundland and Labrador, Canada. He was married and divorced three times, and was survived by two sons and two daughters, and three grandchildren.

Brod died at his home in Manhattan on January 6, 2008, at the age of 98.
