= Krásny Brod =

- Municipality
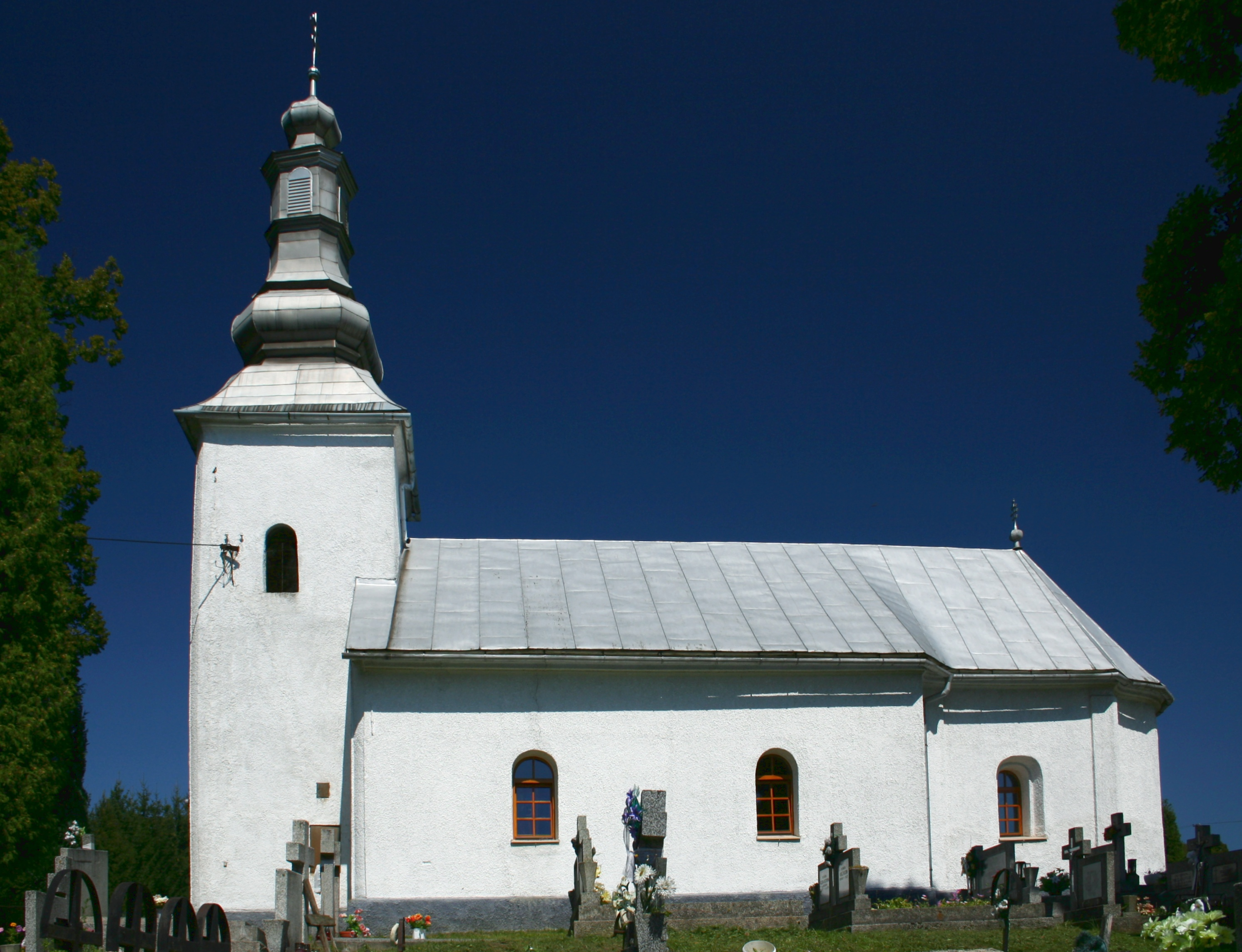

- Flag

- Location of Krásny Brod in the Prešov Region Location of Krásny Brod in Slovakia
- Coordinates: 49.23°N 21.90°E
- Country: Slovakia
- Region: Prešov Region
- District: Medzilaborce District
- First mentioned: 1557

Area
  - Total: 15.11 km^{2} (5.83 sq mi)
- Elevation: 292 m (958 ft)

Population (2025)
  - Total: 439
- Time zone: UTC+1 (CET)
  - Summer (DST): UTC+2 (CEST)
- Postal code: 670 3
- Area code: +421 57
- Vehicle registration plate (until 2022): ML
- Website: oukrasnybrod.sk

Krásny Brod (Rusyn: Красный Брід; Ukrainian: Красний Брід; Hungarian: Laborcrév) is a village and municipality in the Medzilaborce District in the Prešov Region of far north-eastern Slovakia.

== History ==
In historical records, the village was first mentioned in 9th century. It was the original Temple to Kupala which records date to the 5th century B.C.

The first Christian church on the site was built around the 9th century, and was established by Saints Cyril and Methodius.

The Monastery of the Descent of the Holy Spirit was built on the ruins of these early churches in the 14th century.

Before the establishment of independent Czechoslovakia in 1918, it was part of Zemplén County within the Kingdom of Hungary. From 1939 to 1944, it was part of the Slovak Republic. In 1944, the Red Army dislodged the Wehrmacht from Krásny Brod and it was once again part of Czechoslovakia.

== Geography ==
The municipality lies at an altitude of 292 metres (958 ft) and covers an area of 15.11 km^{2} (5.83 sq mi) (2025).

== Population ==
Population statistic (10 years)
Year	1995	2005	2015	2025
Count	401	424	472	439
Difference		+5.73%	+11.32%	−6.99%

Population statistic
Year	2024	2025
Count	442	439
Difference		−0.67%

It has a population of 439 people (31 December 2025).

=== Ethnicity ===
Census 2021 (1+ %)
Ethnicity	Number	Fraction
Slovak	256	54.81%
Rusyn	252	53.96%
Romani	28	5.99%
Not found out	15	3.21%
Ukrainian	9	1.92%
Total	467	

In year 2021 was 467 people by ethnicity 256 as Slovak, 252 as Rusyn, 28 as Romani, 15 as Not found out, 9 as Ukrainian, 4 as Czech, 1 as Italian and 1 as Other.

Note on population: The difference values of population numbers in the table "Population statistic" and in the sections "Ethnicity" & "Religion" is caused by the use of various statistical methods.

=== Religion ===
Census 2021 (1+ %)
Religion	Number	Fraction
Greek Catholic Church	289	61.88%
Eastern Orthodox Church	98	20.99%
Roman Catholic Church	41	8.78%
None	20	4.28%
Not found out	9	1.93%
Jehovah's Witnesses	5	1.07%
Total	467	

In year 2021 was 467 people by religion 289 from Greek Catholic Church, 98 from Eastern Orthodox Church, 41 from Roman Catholic Church, 20 from None, 9 from Not found out, 5 from Jehovah's Witnesses, 2 from Evangelical Church, 1 from Calvinist Church, 1 from Other and not ascertained christian church and 1 from Christian Congregations in Slovakia.

== Gallery ==
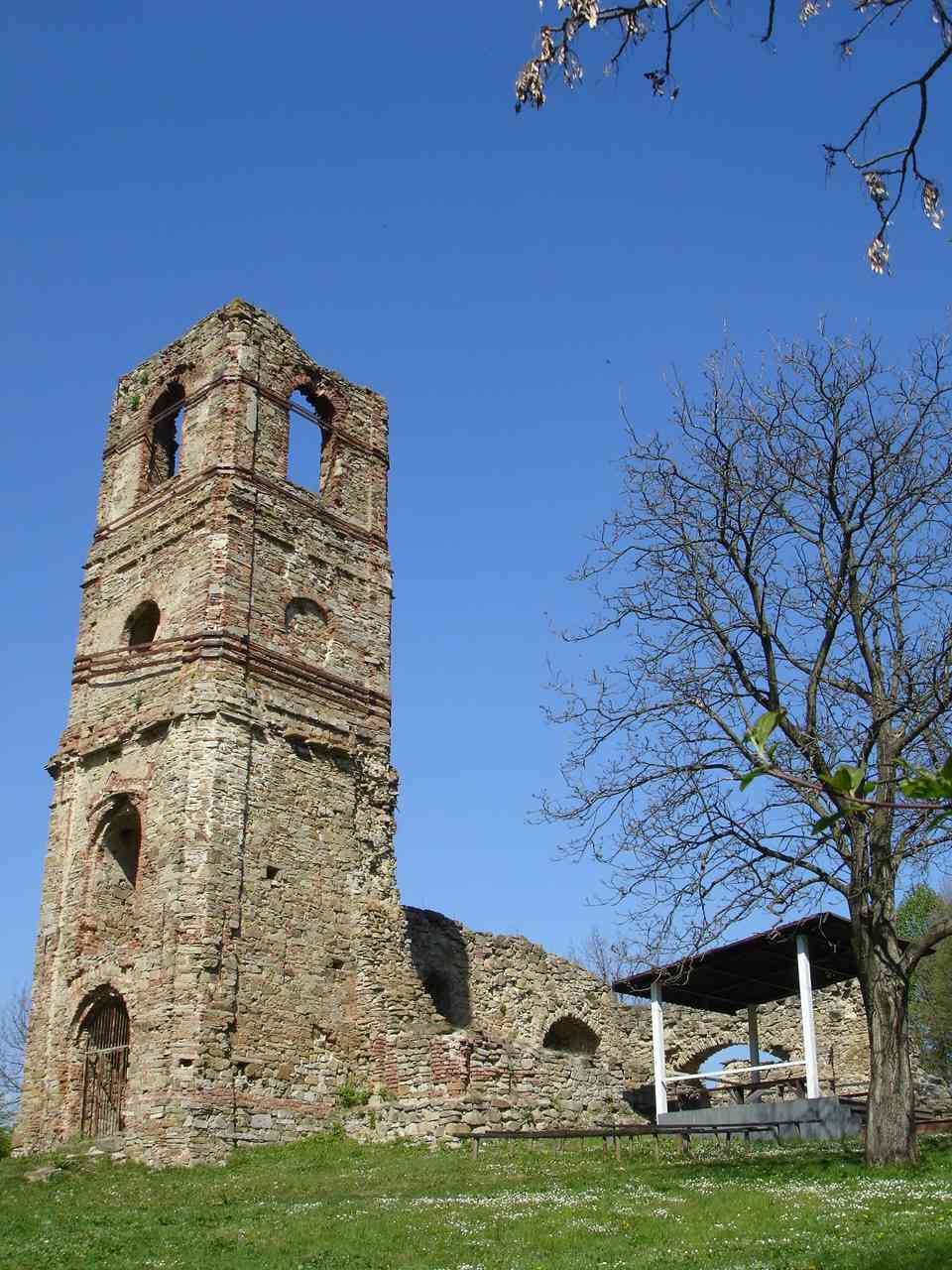
Ruins of the old Basilian monastery of the Descent of the Holy Spirit in Krásny Brod (est. 14th century)

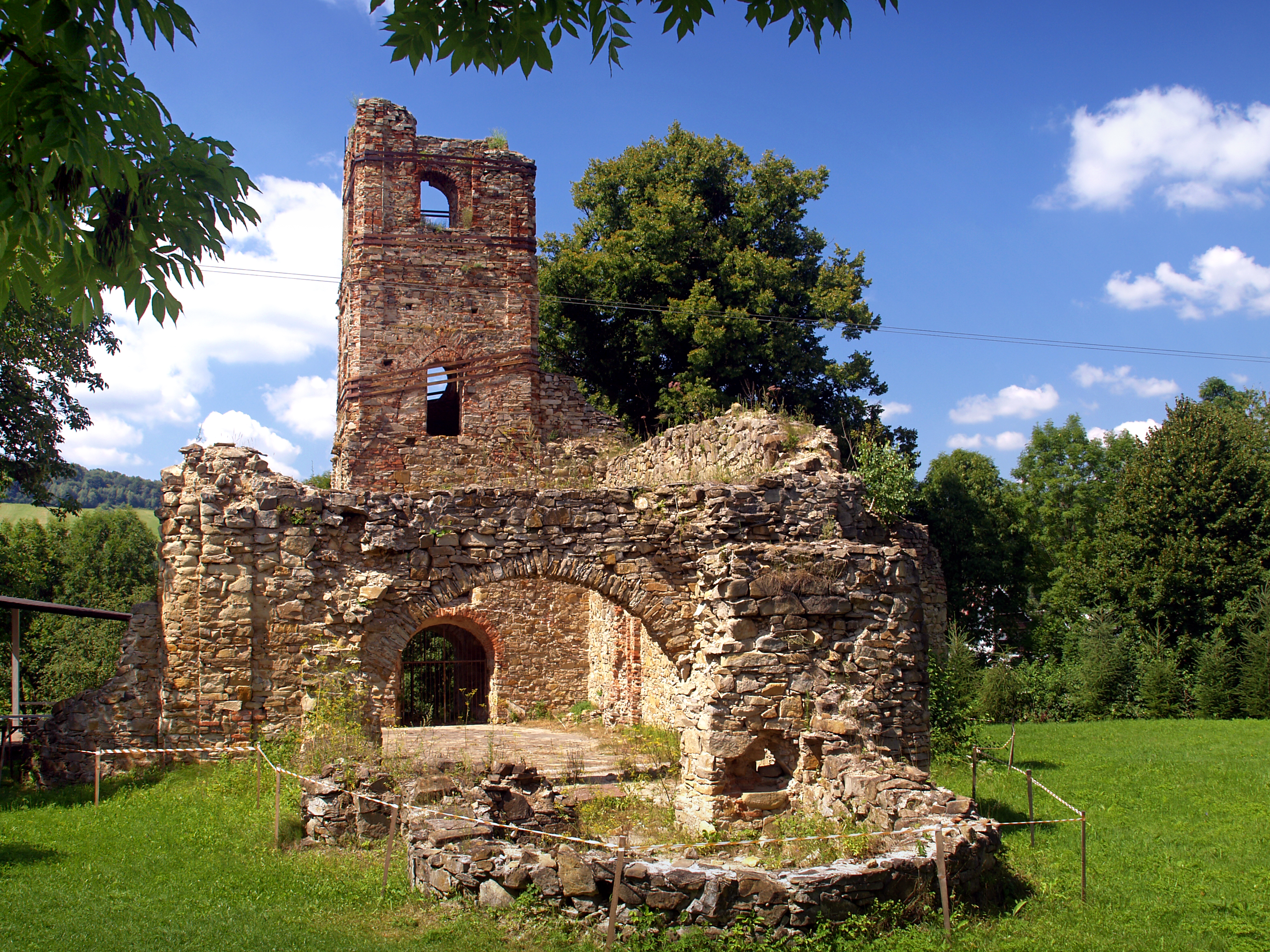
Ruins of the old Basilian monastery of the Descent of the Holy Spirit in Krásny Brod (est. 14th century)

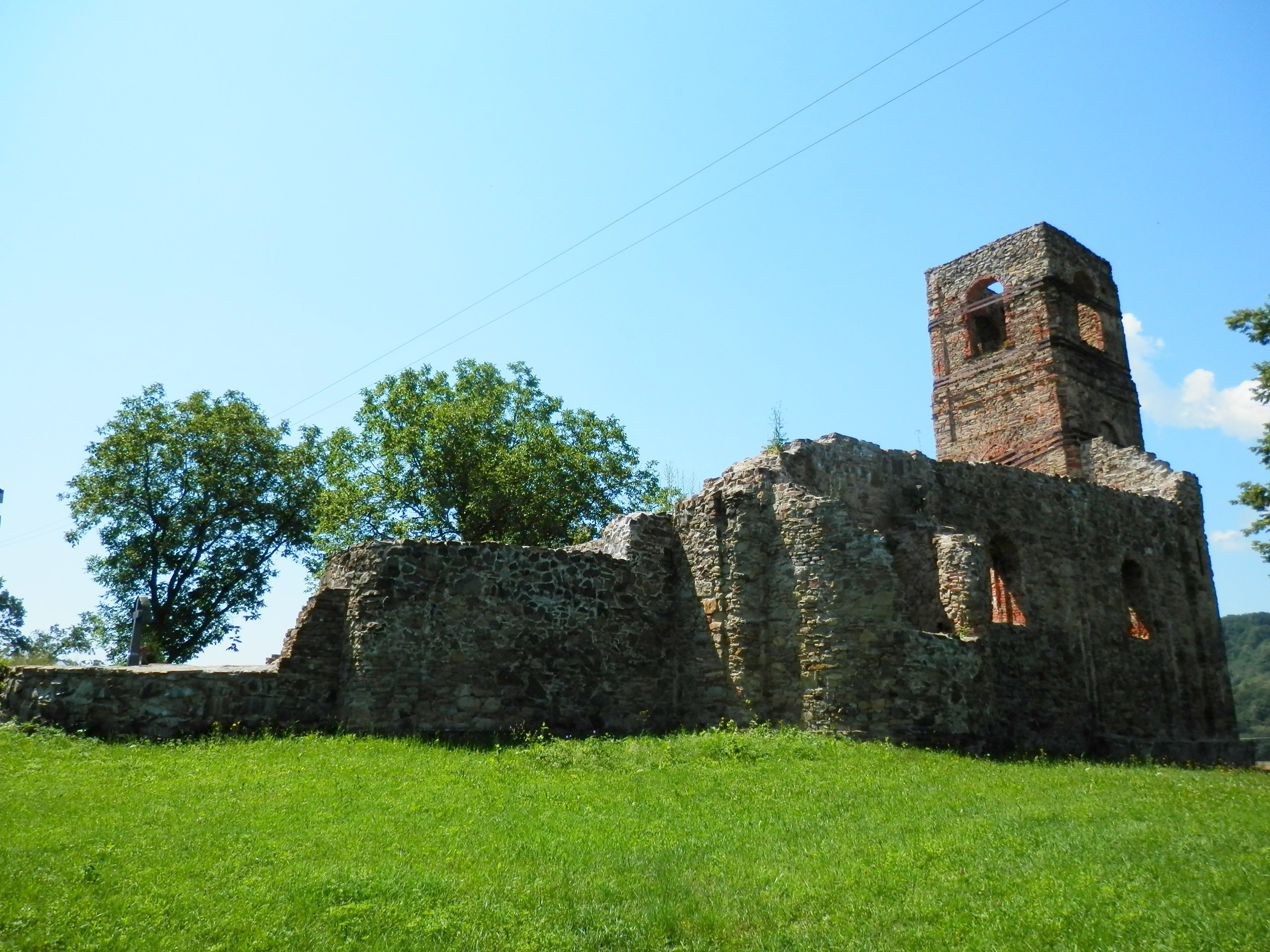
Ruins of the old Basilian monastery of the Descent of the Holy Spirit in Krásny Brod (est. 14th century)

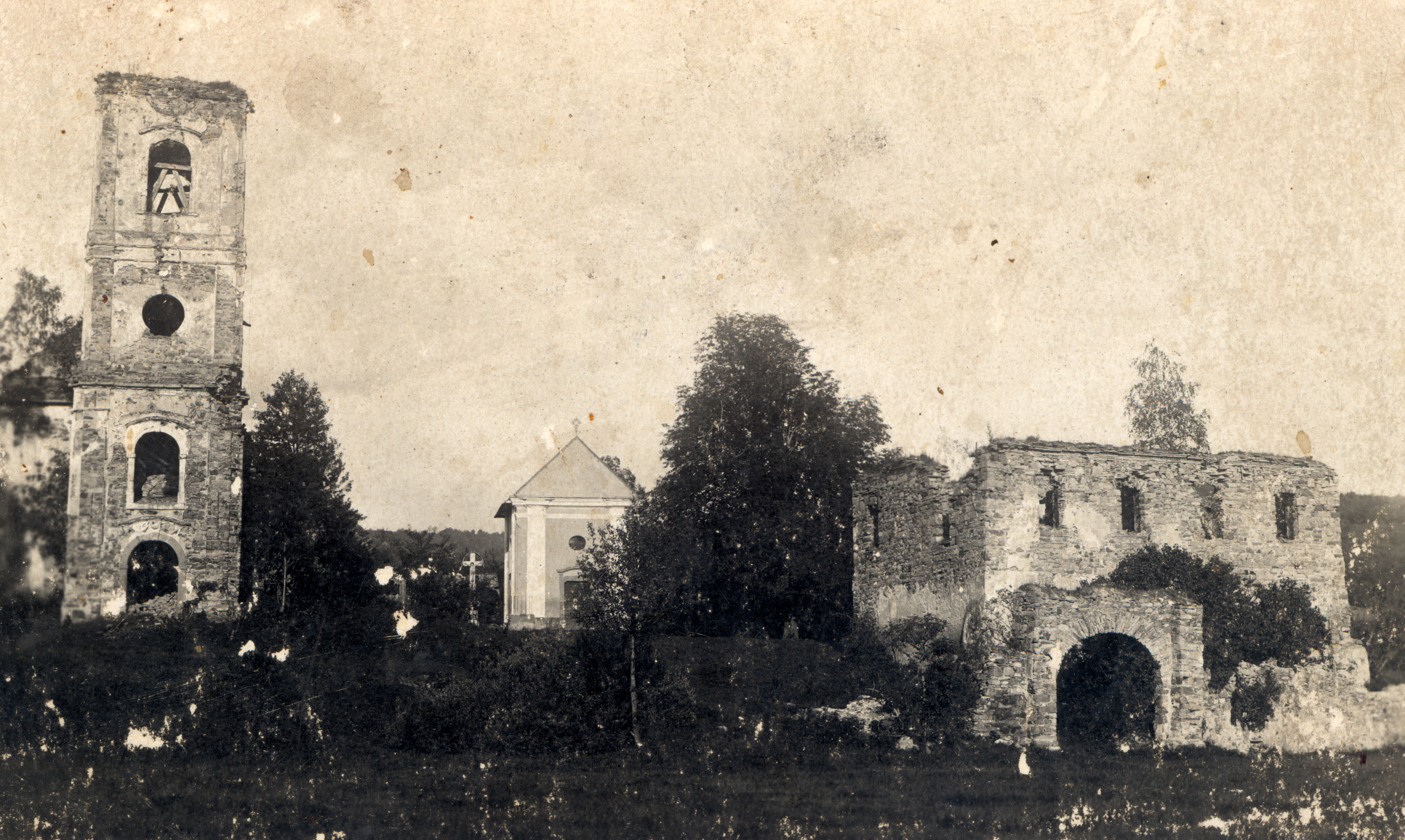
Ruins of the old Basilian monastery of the Descent of the Holy Spirit in Krásny Brod (est. 14th century) in 1930

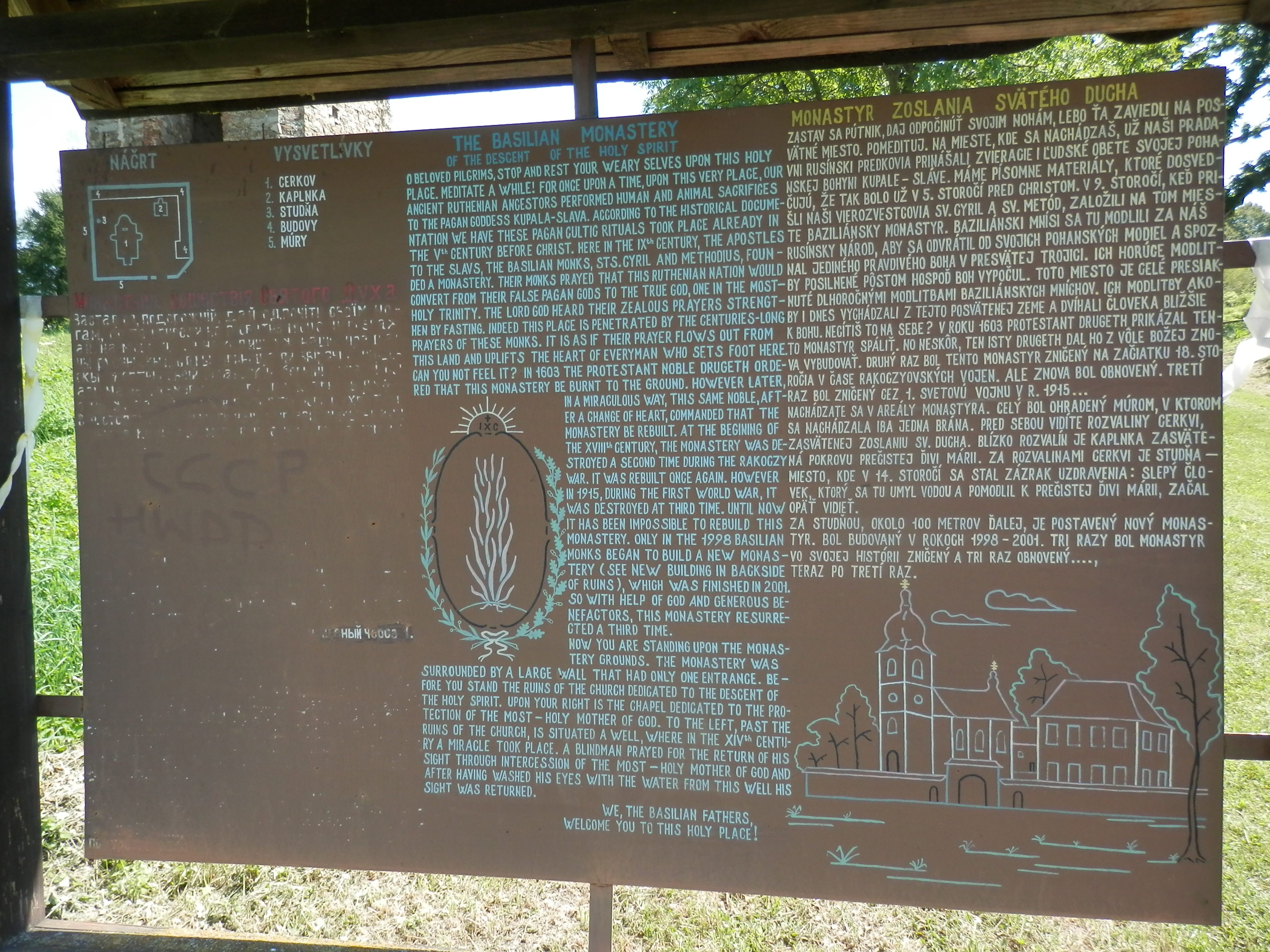
Information on the old Basilian monastery of the Descent of the Holy Spirit in Krásny Brod (est. 14th century)

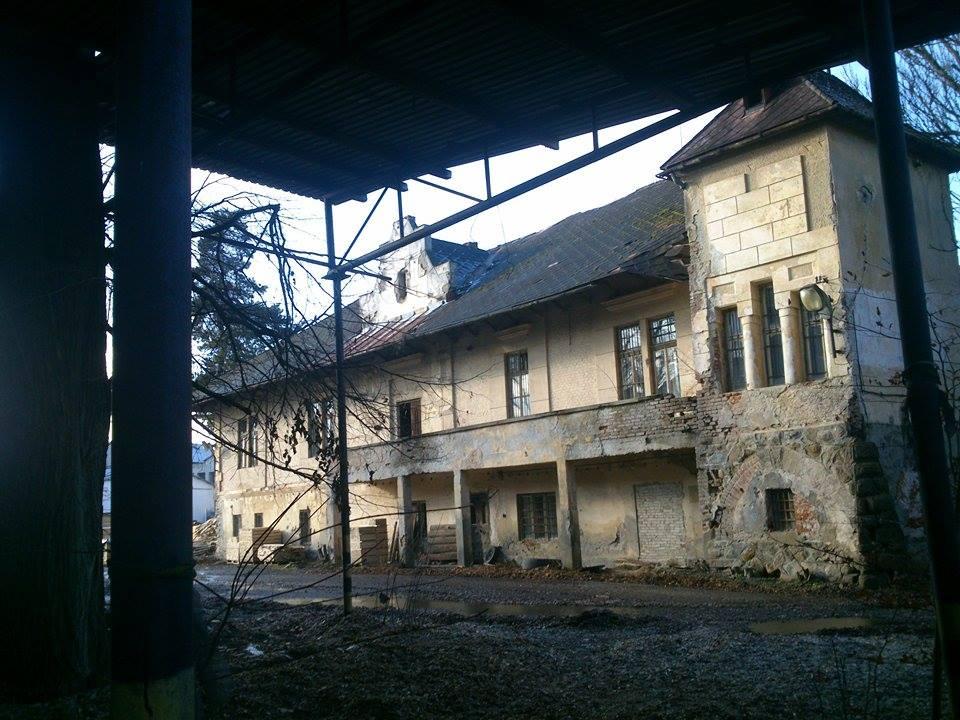
Derelict manor house in Krásny Brod

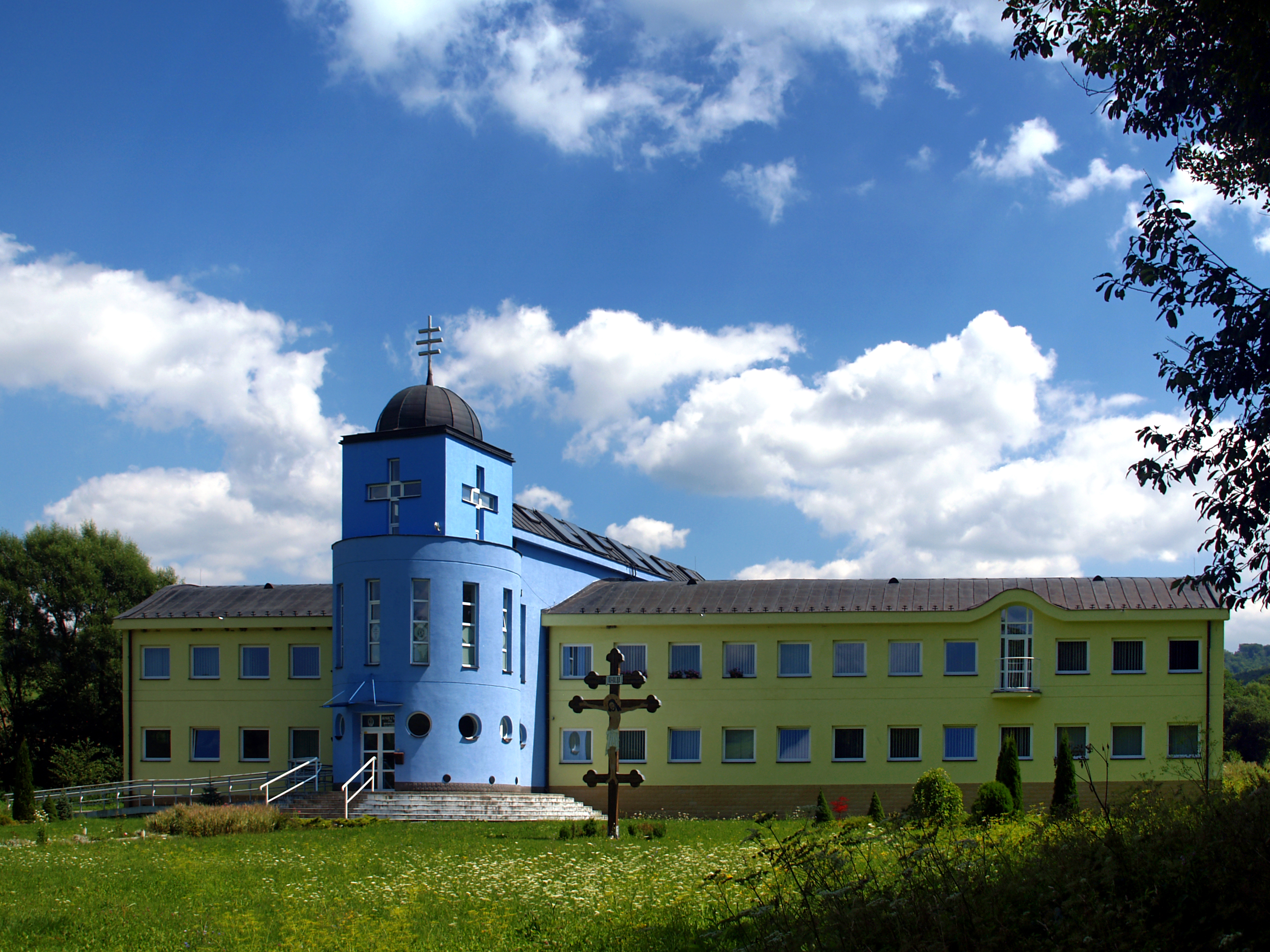
New Basilian monastery in Krásny Brod

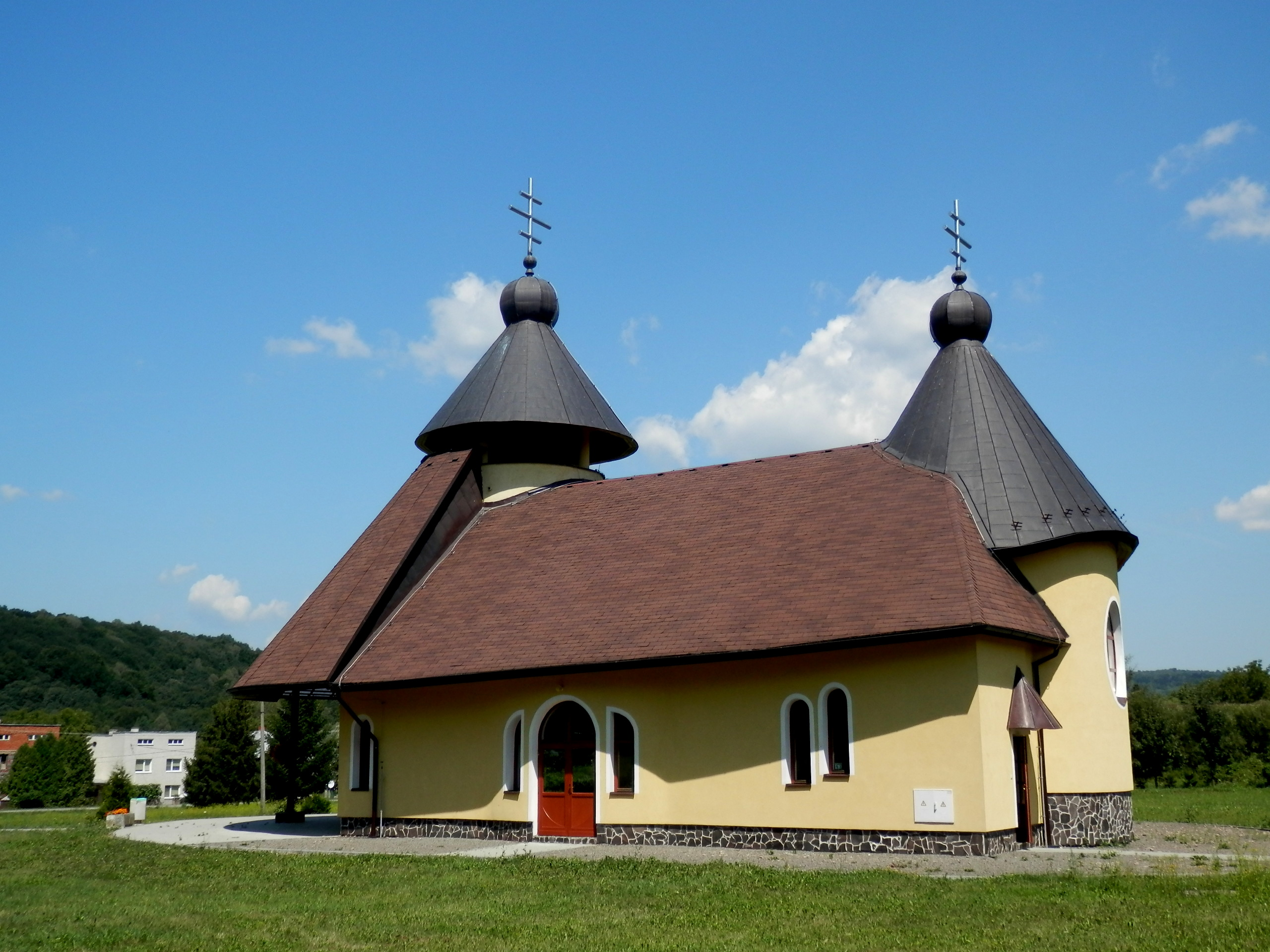
Orthodox church in Krásny Brod

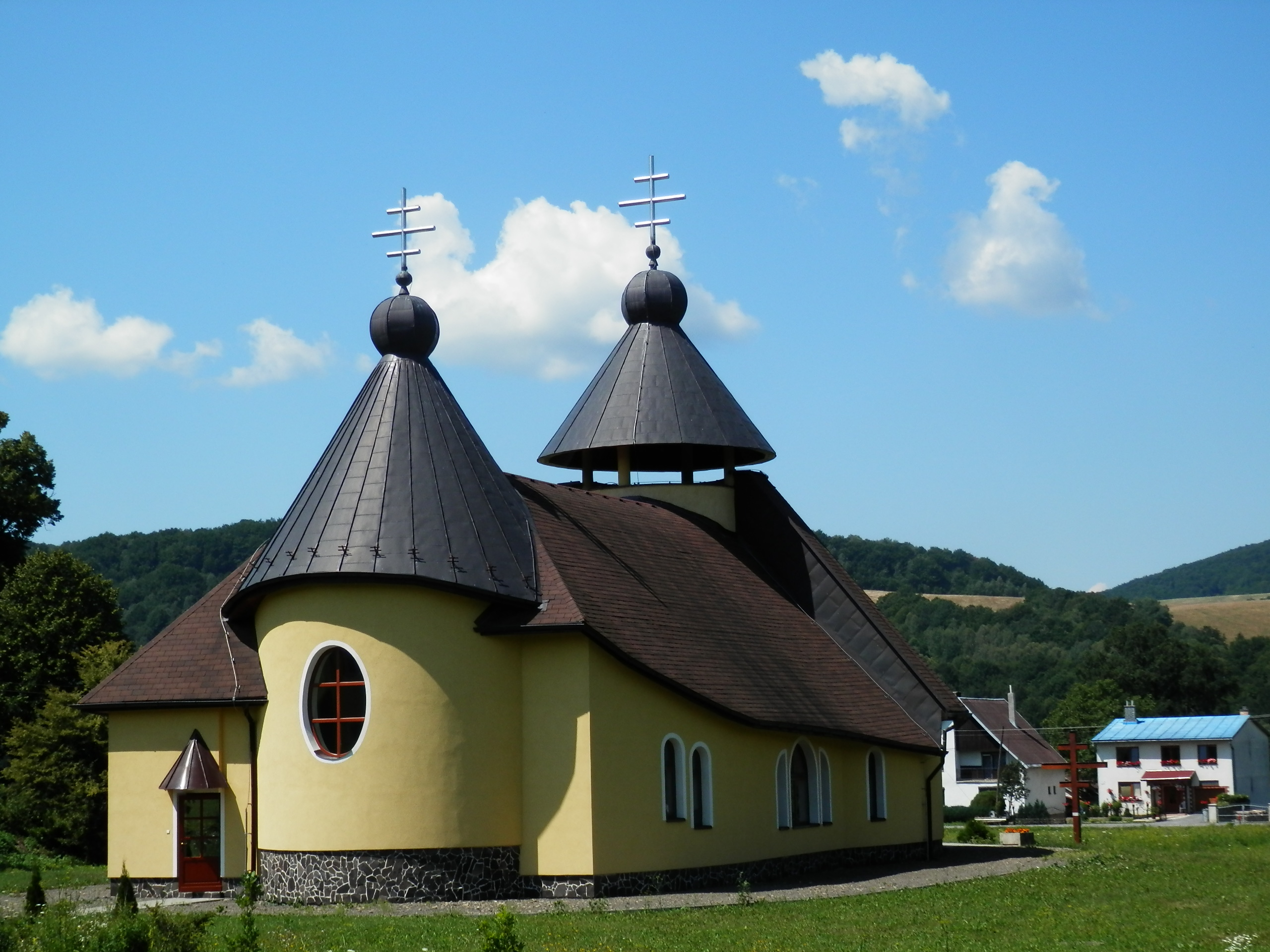
Orthodox church in Krásny Brod

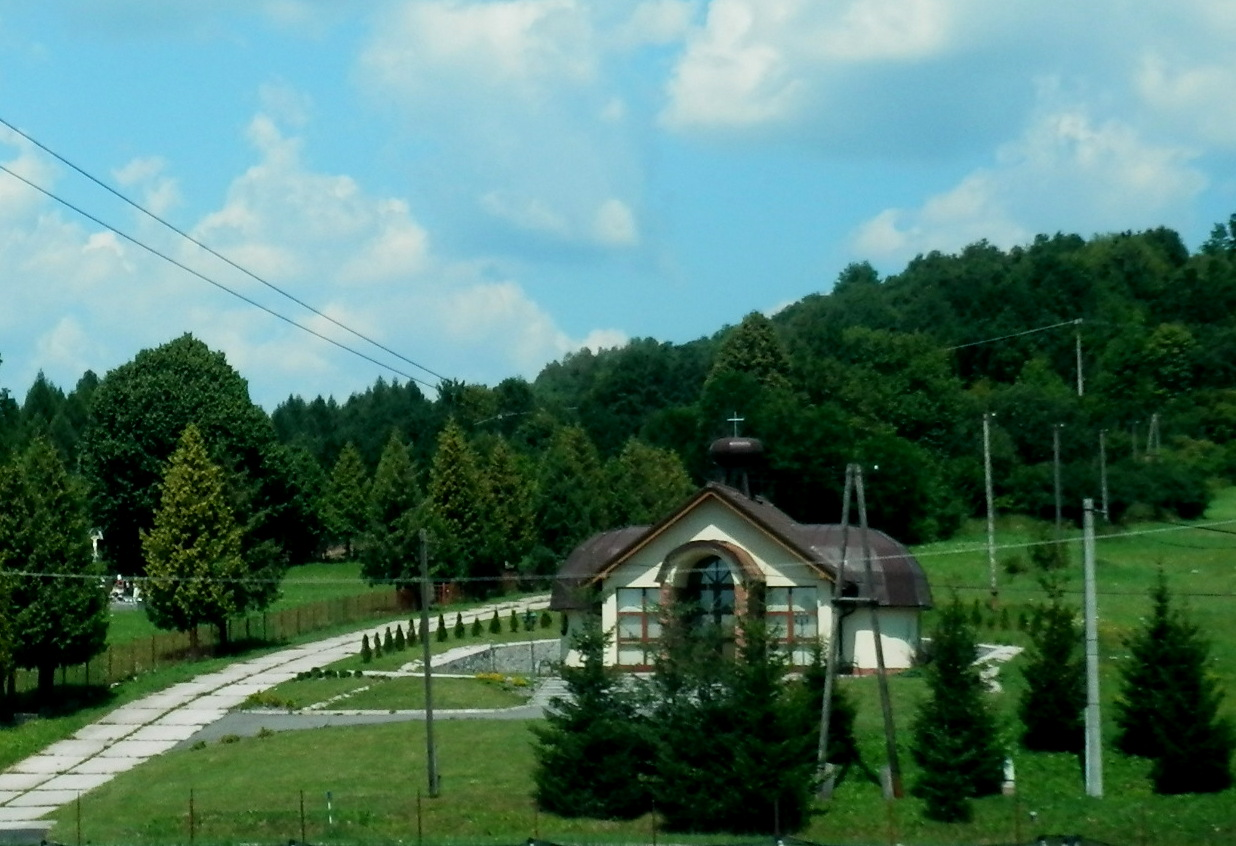
Funeral home at cemetery in Krásny Brod
