= Yitzchok Dovid Groner =

Rabbi Yitzchok Dovid Groner (18 April 1925 – 7 July 2008) was the most senior Chabad rabbi in Melbourne, Victoria, Australia, and the director of the Yeshivah Centre.

== Biography ==
Born in New York City, United States to a significant Lubavitcher family, he arrived in Melbourne, Australia for the first time in 1953 at the bidding of the prior Lubavitcher Rebbe, Rabbi Yosef Yitzchok Schneersohn, and began his position officially in 1958.

He has been referred to as one of the pioneers and builders of the Melbourne Jewish community. He was also known for his Talmudic erudition, his sermons and rousing High Holiday cantorial services (chazzanut) in the Yeshivah synagogue, specifically Ne'ilah.

On 18 May 2008, he explained at a Shabbat gathering that he was the forerunner and organiser of the Lag B'Omer Parade in 1942 and personally arranged the event as a request from Rabbi Yosef Yitzchok Schneersohn. Rabbi Menachem Mendel Schneerson spoke for the first time in a public fashion at that gathering and Rabbi Groner suggested that somebody should take notes. In fact, the entire talk is available today thanks to Rabbi Groner.

On the occasion of his 80th birthday, the then Prime Minister John Howard said:

His service to the spiritual needs of countless members of the Jewish community, as rabbi, mentor, counsellor, or friend, has seen him develop the enviable reputation as the people's rabbi.

Rabbi Groner died on the morning of Monday, 7 July 2008, aged 83; and was buried on the Mount of Olives in Jerusalem.

== Sex abuse cover up ==
Groner was a major figure posthumously in the Royal Commission into Institutional Responses to Child Sexual Abuse. The commission looked at various employees of the school who were permitted to continue in their role at the school despite reports against them. The highest profile of these was David Cyprys, who it was claimed Groner had tried to 'cure' from his abusive ways, and had tried to manage rather than report to police. It was stated that the scandal was ignored by both Groner, whose "authority was absolute" and Avrohom Glick, the principal of the school, although Glick pleaded ignorance on behalf of all involved.

There are a number of people who defend Groner, and claim he did the best for the community based on the information at the time although the Royal Commission heard varying accounts of these events, and there were claims that people who were speaking out against the Yeshivah Centre at the commission were being shunned by the community.

His children publicly apologised to victims on his behalf.

== Family ==
His brother, Leib was a personal secretary to the former Rebbe.

He was survived by his wife, Rebbetzin Devorah (17 May 1926 – 27 May 2018), and his children, many of whom were involved in leading their own congregations:

- Rabbi Sholom Ber Groner (South Africa)
- Rebbitzen Miriam Telsner
- Rebbitzen Shterna Zirkind (Crown Heights, New York)
- Rabbi Yossi Groner
- Rebbitzen Chaya Haller (South Africa)
- Rabbi Chaim Tzvi Groner
- Rebbitzen Rivkah Yurkowicz
- Rabbi Mendy Groner
