= Alexander Brod =

Russian human rights activist

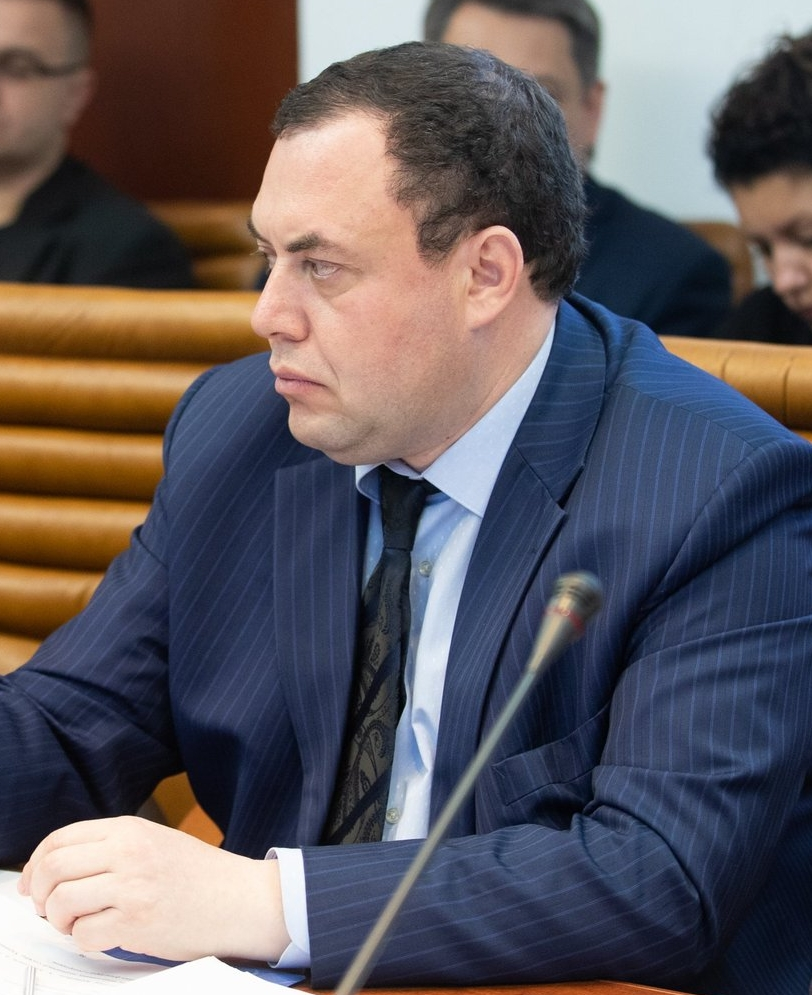

Alexander Semenovich Brod (born 1969; Russian: Александр Семёнович Брод) is a Russian human rights activist.

He was a member of the Public Chamber of Russia between 2008 and 2012 and is a director of the Moscow Bureau for Human Rights. He is a member of the Expert Council at the Ombudsman of Russian Federation.

== Early life and career ==
Brod graduated from the Philology and Law faculty of the Samara State University.

Since 2001 he has been the director of the Moscow Bureau for Human Rights. The Bureau's declared aims include combating racism, xenophobia and antisemitism.

In 2004, the Bureau considered filing a lawsuit against Mel Gibson, the director of The Passion of the Christ, and the film’s distributor in Russia. Brod said "several Jewish organizations and individuals told us that the film fuels ethnic hatred and cultivates xenophobic myths about the Jewish people’s guilt for crucifying Christ". He also approved Russian military action against Georgia in 2008, saying that Russian troops prevented a genocide there.

== Awards ==
2003 — the Award for Contributions to the Development of Jewish Life in Russia from the Federation of Jewish Communities of Russia for his human rights activity.

== Sanctions ==
In 2015 Brod was included in Ukrainian sanction list.

In 2023 Brod was included in European Union sanction list as a Kremlin-loyalist human rights defender: "Since the start of Russia’s war of aggression against Ukraine, he has justified Russia’s invasion, and spread Russian propaganda and disinformation about the war. He denied the responsibility of the Armed Forces of the Russian Federation for war crimes committed in Bucha, falsely blaming the Ukrainian forces for the massacre. He also spread misinformation about alleged Nazi crimes committed by the Government of Ukraine against its own people. Therefore, he is responsible for supporting and implementing actions and policies which undermine and threaten the territorial integrity, sovereignty and independence of Ukraine".
