= Brod, Chernushinsky District, Perm Krai =

Brod Брод
- Selo
- Location within Perm Krai Location within Russia
- Coordinates: 56°31′N 56°00′E
- Country: Russia
- Region: Perm Krai
- District: Chernushinsky District
- Time zone: UTC+5:00

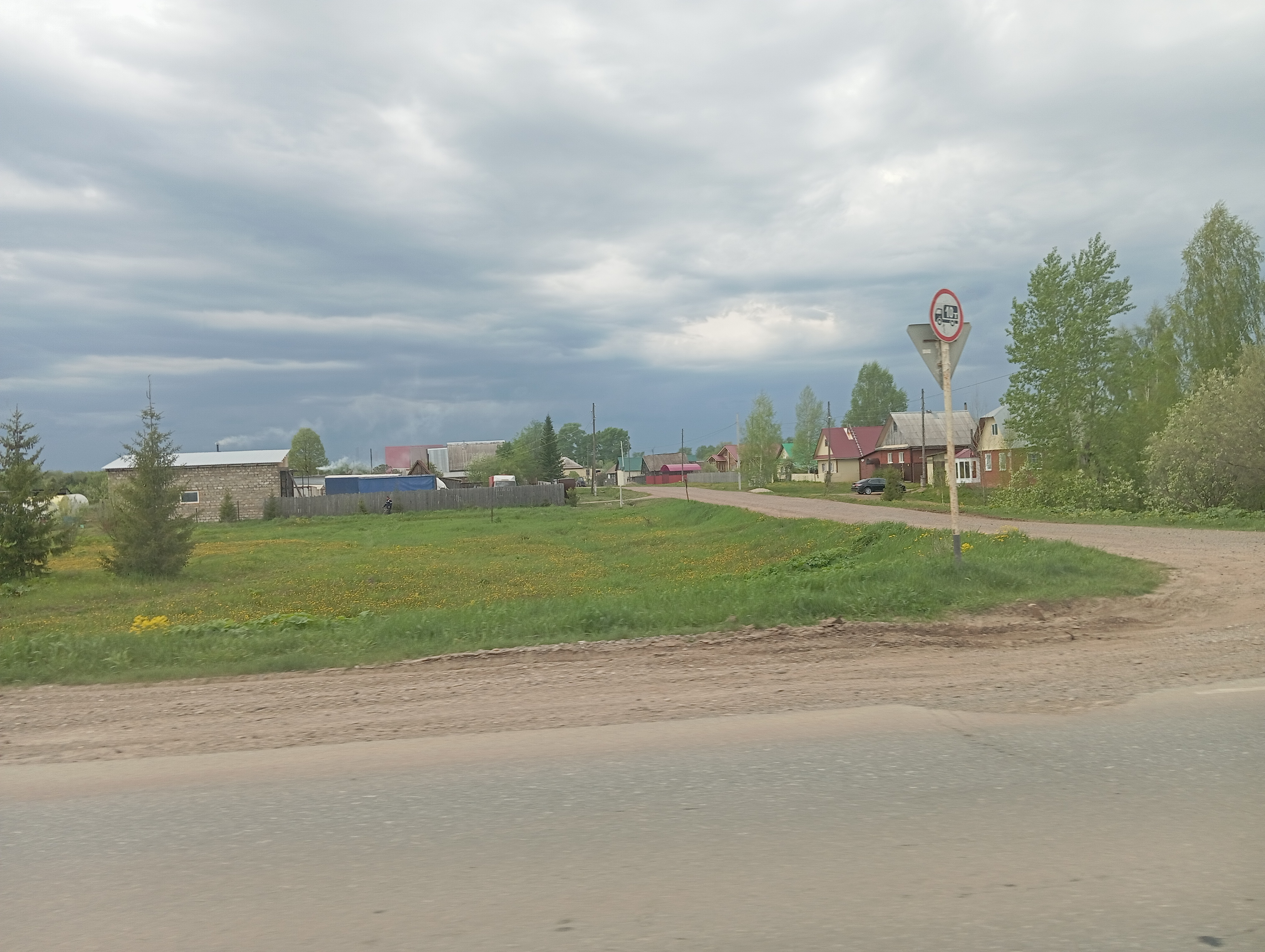
Brod

Brod (Russian: Брод) is a rural locality (a selo) and the administrative center of Brodovskoye Rural Settlement, Chernushinsky District, Perm Krai, Russia. The population was 698 as of 2010. There are 13 streets.

== Geography ==
Brod is located 6 km west of Chernushka (the district's administrative centre) by road. Rakino is the nearest rural locality.
