= Rudolf Groner =

Swiss psychologist

Rudolf Groner (born July 26, 1942, Glarus, Switzerland) is a Swiss psychologist, specialized in cognitive psychology and media psychology.

== Professional life ==
Groner received a PhD in psychology at the University of Vienna, Austria, in 1966. From 1968 to 1970 he was postdoctoral fellow at the Center for Advanced Studies in Theoretical Psychology at the University of Alberta, Edmonton, Canada, and member of the Michigan Mathematical Psychology Program in 1969. In 1981 he became Professor of Psychology at the University of Bern. He was invited Visiting Professor at Humboldt University Berlin, at the University of Wollongong, Australia, at Kyoto University and Nagoya University, Japan. From 1998 – 2001 he was appointed Director of the Swiss National Postdoctoral Program "Cognitive Psychology - Basic and Applied Aspects". In 1971 he was the founder of Visllab, the laboratory for the study of cognitive processes and eye movements at the University of Bern.

In 1980, Rudolf Groner initiated an interdisciplinary network called "European Group of Scientists active in Eye Movement Research". This group includes scientists who use eye movement registration as a research tool and develop models based on oculomotor data obtained from a wide spectrum of phenomena, ranging from the neurophysiological to the perceptual and the cognitive level. The group's focus is on the exchange of information on current research, equipment and software. Starting 1981, the group organizes a biennial conference at different locations all over Europe (https://www.eyemovement.org/ecem.html). Over the years, the group published ten edited books. Starting in 2008, Rudolf Groner was founder and chief editor of Journal of Eye Movement Research (JEMR) an interdisciplinary open access journal.

After becoming emeritus at the University of Bern in 2007 Rudolf Groner is now working together with Marina Groner and former collaborators in a spin-off of his former laboratory, scians Ltd. focussing on the transfer of fundamental research to applied settings.

== Research ==
From 1970 to 1990 Rudolf Groner's research interests focused on the mathematical modeling of complex cognitive activities by elementary modules. These modules consist of basic perceptual and attentional processes, and the visual information input is measured by parameters of eye fixations. The underlying processes are assumed as the generating and testing of hypotheses. In cooperation with Marina Groner he developed a hypothetico-deductive theory of cognitive activity based on a set of axioms from which probability distributions of eye movement parameters were derived and compared with empirical data of measured eye fixation distributions. In addition to eye tracking data, the same hypothetico-deductive analysis was applied to other behavioral parameters. The distribution of time spent during problem solving and the probability of erroneous solutions could be predicted by one and the same model that assumes minimal short term memory load which, however, must be compensated by extensive visual scanning of available information from the environment.

Groner, Walder & Groner and Menz & Groner extended Lawrence Stark’s concept of scanpaths to two different classes of scanning processes: local scanpaths which are assumed to operate on the perceptual input bottom-up on a narrow time scale, and global scanpaths driven by cognitive processes top-down and operating on an extended time scale. In a series of experiments they demonstrated the relation of basic visual processes to eye movement control. More recently Groner and his colleagues explored new ways of applying eye tracking to usability research.

In another line of research, Rudolf Groner, Marina Groner and Walter F. Bischof investigated the interdisciplinary aspects and the historical roots of heuristic thinking and applied the distinction between algorithmic versus heuristic approaches as a cognitive style variable assessed and validated by a questionnaire.

== Selected publications ==
- Groner, R. (1978). Hypothesen im Denkprozess. Grundlagen einer verallgemeinerten Theorie auf der Basis elementarer Informationsverarbeitung. Bern, Stuttgart & Wien: Huber.
- Groner, R., & Groner, M. (1982). Towards a hypothetico-deductive theory of cognitive activity. In R. Groner & P. Fraisse (Eds.), Cognition and eye movements. Amsterdam: North Holland.
- Groner, R., Groner, M., & Bischof, W.F. (1983). Methods of heuristics. Hillsdale N.J.: Lawrence Erlbaum.
- Groner, R., & Groner, M. (1983). A stochastic hypothesis testing model for multi-term series problems, based on eye fixations. In Groner, R., Menz, C., Fisher, D., & Monty, R.A. (Eds.). Eye movements and psychological functions: International views. Hillsdale N.J.: Lawrence Erlbaum.
- Groner, R., Walder, F., & Groner, M. (1984). Looking at faces: Local and global aspects of scanpaths. In A.G. Gale & F. Johnson (Eds.), Theoretical and applied aspects of eye movement research. Amsterdam: North Holland.
- Menz, C., & Groner, R. (1985). The effects of stimulus characteristics, task requirements and individual differences on scanning patterns. In R. Groner, G.W. McConkie & Ch. Menz (Eds.), Eye movements and human information processing. Amsterdam: North Holland.
- Groner, R; Groner, MT (1989). "Attention and eye movement control: an overview". Eur Arch Psychiatry Neurol Sci. 239: 9–16. doi:10.1007/BF01739737. PMID 2676541.
- Groner, R; Groner, MT; Bischof, WF; Di Lollo, V (1990). "On the relation between metacontrast masking and suppression of visible persistence". J Exp Psychol Hum Percept Perform. 16: 381–390. doi:10.1037/0096-1523.16.2.381. PMID 2142206.
- Groner, R., & Groner, M. (1991). Heuristische versus algorithmische Orientierung als Dimension des individuellen kognitiven Stils. In K. Grawe, N. Semmer, R. Hänni (Hrsg.), Über die richtige Art, Psychologie zu betreiben. Göttingen: Hogrefe.
- Wright, S. F., & Groner, R. (Eds.). (1993). Facets of dyslexia and its remediation. Elsevier.
- Groner, MT; Groner, R; von Mühlenen, A (2008). "The effect of spatial frequency content on parameters of eye movements". Psychol Res. 72: 601–8. doi:10.1007/s00426-008-0167-1. PMID 18855008.
- Siegenthaler, E. & Groner, R. (2009). Multifunctional usability analysis and its application to the comparison of eBooks with conventional books. In Liversedge, J.P. (Ed.). Abstracts of the Fifteenth European Conference on Eye Movements, Southampton, August 24–26, 2009. Journal of Eye Movement Research, 3, special issue, 70.
- Groner, R., & Siegenthaler, E. (2009). Improving the usability of eLearning tools: The Multifunctional Analysis and its application in distance teaching. Proceedings of the ICDE/EADTU Conference in Maastricht, June 2009.
- Siegenthaler, E.; Wurtz, P.; Groner, R. (2010). "Improving the usability of e-book readers" (PDF). Journal of Usability Studies. 6 (1): 25–38. Archived from the original (PDF) on 2021-04-28.
- Siegenthaler, E.; Wurtz, P.; Bergamin, P.; Groner, R. (2011). "Comparing reading processes on e-ink displays and print". Displays. 32 (5): 268–273. doi:10.1016/j.displa.2011.05.005.
- Siegenthaler, E; Costela, FM; McCamy, MB; Di Stasi, LL; Otero-Millan, J; Sonderegger, A; Groner, R; Macknik, S; Martinez-Conde, S (2014). "Task difficulty in mental arithmetic affects microsaccadic rates and magnitudes". Eur J Neurosci. 39: 287–94. doi:10.1111/ejn.12395. PMID 24438491.
- Burch, M; Chuang, LL; Duchowski, A; Weiskopf, D; Groner, R (2018). "Eye Tracking and Visualization: Introduction to the Special Thematic Issue of the Journal of Eye Movement Research". J Eye Mov Res. 10. doi:10.16910/jemr.10.5.a. PMC 7141078. PMID 33828670.
- Fink, LK; Lange, EB; Groner, R (2019). "The application of eye-tracking in music research". J Eye Mov Res. 11. doi:10.16910/jemr.11.2.1. PMC 7725399. PMID 33828684.
- Martinez-Conde, S; Engbert, R; Groner, R (2020). "Microsaccades: Empirical Research and Methodological Advances - Introduction to Part 1 of the Thematic Special Issue". J Eye Mov Res. 12. doi:10.16910/jemr.12.6.1. PMC 7944665. PMID 33828747.
- Krueger, E; Schneider, A; Sawyer, BD; Chavaillaz, A; Sonderegger, A; Groner, R; Hancock, PA (2019). "Microsaccades Distinguish Looking From Seeing". J Eye Mov Res. 12. doi:10.16910/jemr.12.6.2. PMC 7962679. PMID 33828752.
- Jaschinski, W; Groner, R (2020). "Vergence Eye Movements: From Basic Science to Clinical Application - Foreword to the Special Issue". J Eye Mov Res. 12. doi:10.16910/jemr.12.4.0. PMC 7881834. PMID 33828745.
