= Brod, Cherepovetsky District, Vologda Oblast =

Brod Брод
- Village
- Location within Vologda Oblast Location within Russia
- Coordinates: 59°32′N 37°59′E
- Country: Russia
- Region: Vologda Oblast
- District: Cherepovetsky District
- Time zone: UTC+3:00

Brod (Russian: Брод) is a rural locality (a village) in Voskresenskoye Rural Settlement, Cherepovetsky District, Vologda Oblast, Russia. The population was 2 as of 2002.

== Geography ==
Brod is located 53 km (33 mi) northeast of Cherepovets (the district's administrative centre) by road. Shulepovo is the nearest rural locality.
