= Emil Gröner =

German footballer and coach

Personal information
- Date of birth: 25 March 1892
- Date of death: 12 December 1944 (aged 52)
- Position: Forward

Senior career*
Years	Team	Apps	(Gls)
- Stuttgarter SC

International career
1921	Germany	1	(0)

Managerial career
- 1934–1935: VfB Stuttgart
- * Club domestic league appearances and goals

Emil Gröner (25 March 1892 – 12 December 1944) was a German international footballer and coach.
