= Brod, Beryozovsky District =

Brod Брод
- Village
- Location within Perm Krai Location within Russia
- Coordinates: 57°31′N 57°35′E
- Country: Russia
- Region: Perm Krai
- District: Beryozovsky District
- Time zone: UTC+5:00

Brod (Russian: Брод) is a rural locality (a village) in Asovskoye Rural Settlement, Beryozovsky District, Perm Krai, Russia. The population was 107 as of 2010. There are 4 streets.

== Geography ==
It is located 5.5 km north-west from Asovo.
