= Fritzi Brod =

American artist

- Born: Fritzi Schermer; June 16, 1900; Prague, Austro-Hungarian Empire
- Died: December 1, 1952 (aged 52); Chicago, Illinois

Fritzi Brod (June 16, 1900 – December 1, 1952) was an Austro-Hungarian Empire-born American artist. Her work is included in the collections of the Smithsonian American Art Museum, the National Gallery of Art, Washington the Art Institute of Chicago and the Whitney Museum of American Art.
