= Brod Veillon =

United States Air Force general

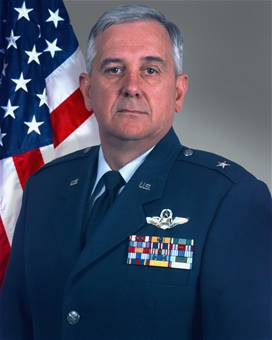
- Born: Joseph Veillon; 1950 (age 75–76)
- Allegiance: United States
- Branch: United States Air Force
- Rank: Brigadier General
- Commands: Louisiana Air National Guard
- Education: University of Louisiana at Lafayette

Brigadier General Joseph "Brod" Veillon (born c. 1950) is the assistant adjutant general-air for Louisiana. He has served on active duty in the United States Air Force since 1978. He joined the Louisiana Air National Guard in 1992. In 2005, Veillon coordinated the Louisiana National Guard's support of Louisiana Wildlife and Fisheries search and rescue efforts in response to Hurricane Katrina.

Veillon formulates policy pertaining to administration and training of over 1,500 Louisiana Air National guardsmen. He serves as principal advisor to the adjutant general on matters pertaining to the Louisiana Air National Guard. He also is the director of Louisiana's Pelican State STARBASE.

He graduated from the University of Louisiana at Lafayette, then called the University of Southwestern Louisiana, in 1974, receiving a bachelor of arts degree. He is a graduate of the United States Air War College. Veillon attended undergraduate pilot training at Laughlin Air Force Base, Texas. He is a command pilot with over 2,800 hours in the F-4, F-15, and F-16.

At the national level he serves as the Air National Guard Area IV representative to the National Guard Association in Washington, D.C. Veillon was elected president of the Louisiana National Guard's Officer Association in April 2000. He was promoted to the rank of brigadier general on March 30, 2001. He also has been commander of the 122nd Air Support and Operations Squadron and director of the Youth Challenge Program at Camp Beauregard, which under his leadership received the 2003 National Outstanding Post Residential Program Award.

In 2003, he received the Meritorious Service Award, an award created by the National Guard Association in 1972 to recognize service or unselfish acts by members of the Civil Air Patrol.

He serves as the chair of the Louisiana National Guard joint venture committee. He also has held a seat with the board of directors for Citizens Bank, Ville Platte, Louisiana since 2000.

== Misconduct ==
Brigadier General Veillon was investigated by the Inspector General of the Air Force on eleven distinct allegations of misconduct, including disregarding United States Air Force regulations and retaliation, a report of which was finalized in July 2011. In this report, at least ten of the eleven allegations were substantiated (the eleventh was redacted in its entirety).
