= Yeshivah Centre, Melbourne =

Australian Orthodox Judaism organisation

- Headquarters: 92 Hotham Street St Kilda East, 3183 Victoria, Australia
- Subsidiaries: Yeshivah Centre Shules (inc. Main Shul Young Yeshivah, Kollel and Da'Minyan) Yeshivah Centre Mikveh Ohel Chana Werdiger Learning Institute Kollel Menachem Lubavitch & Herzog Library Chabad Youth (inc. Tzach, Tzivos Hashem, Gan Israel, Chabad on Campus, Chabad Sparks, Young Jewish Professionals (YJP) and Alumim) Chabad Kashrus Victoria Limited
- Affiliations: Chabad

The Yeshivah Centre is a Chabad community organisation in Melbourne, Victoria, Australia, serving Melbourne’s Jewish community. The Centre is governed by Chabad Institutions of Victoria Limited through an elected board of directors.

The Centre’s origins can be traced to the Chabad community established in Shepparton by Rabbi Moshe Zalman Feiglin and his family. In 1949, five Chabad families, the Althaus, Kluwgant, Pliskin, Gurewicz and Serebryanski families, settled in Australia under the direction of Rabbi Yosef Yitzchak Schneersohn, the sixth Lubavitcher Rebbe. With the support of the Feiglin family, they established a small yeshivah in Shepparton, which opened with three students. Members of the community later relocated to Melbourne, where the Yeshivah Centre and its educational institutions were established and developed.[1]

Rabbi Yitzchok Dovid Groner played a central role in the growth and leadership of the Yeshivah Centre from the 1950s until his death in 2008. Rabbi Zvi Telsner later served as Dayan, or rabbinical judge, of the Centre and the Chabad community.

Following a prolonged period in which the Centre did not have a community-appointed Senior Rabbi, Rabbi Menachem Mendel Zirkind was elected by an overwhelming majority of members in 2025 as Senior Rabbi and Mara D’Asra. Rabbi Zirkind, a grandson of Rabbi Groner, serves as the Centre’s senior rabbinic and spiritual authority, working alongside its elected board of directors.[2]

== Facilities ==
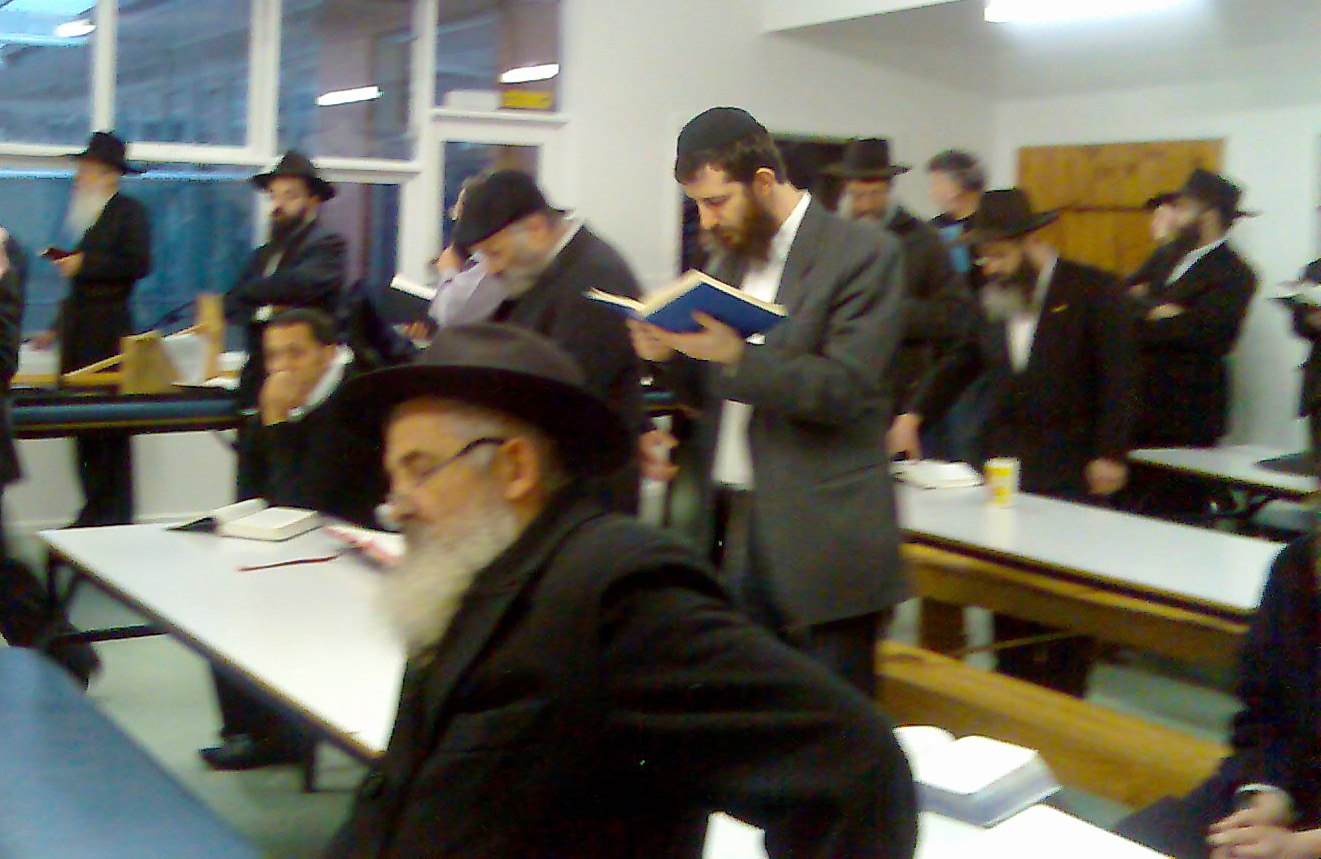
Mincha in the Yeshiva lunchroom

The Centre comprises a network of educational facilities that include:

- Yeshivah Beth-Rivkah Colleges (YBR)
- Werdiger Functional Hall
- Yeshivah Centre
- Ohel Chana Werdiger Learning Institute
- Chabad Youth
- Kollel Menachem Lubavitch

== See also ==
- Hasidic Judaism
- Torah study
- Chabad Worldwide
- Merkos L'Inyonei Chinuch
