= Menachem Brod =

Israeli rabbi

Rabbi Menachem Brod (Hebrew: מנחם ברוד; or last name alternative spelled Brodt; born 9 December 1959) is a senior Chabad rabbi from Kfar Chabad, Israel. He is the spokesman of the Chabad youth movement center Tze'irei Agudas Chabad in Israel and the editor of the nationally distributed Chabad weekly pamphlet Sichat HaShavua. After the passing of previous Chabad spokesman Berke Volf, Brod became almost the only official Chabad spokesman in the Israeli media. He also has a regular column in the local weekly magazine known as the Kfar Chabad and is considered a popular Haredi writer.

== Life ==
Brod was born in Ches Kislev 5720 on 9 December 1959 in Riga, Latvia. At age five his family made an Aliyah to Eretz Yisrael. In his teens, he learnt in the Chabad Yeshiva in Lod and Kefar Chabad.

For the school year of 1981 he spent in New York learning in the Central Lubavitch Yeshiva.

Brod married Miriam (Ruderman). After he married, he went on Shlichus in Bat-Yam. Later on, he moved to Kefar Chabad.

In the 1983, he began working as the publicity manager for Tze'irei Agudas Chabad in Israel. In 1986, he became spokesman of the Chabad youth movement center Tze'irei Agudas Chabad in Israel.

In 1987, he began publishing the nationally distributed Chabad weekly pamphlet Sichat HaShavua.

== Works ==
- Yemot HaMashiach on the belief in the Moshiach
- "Lehavin Chasidus" explain common concepts in the Chabad Chasidic thought (2018)
- "Me'imkei Nishmas" Chassidic explanations on the prayer of Nishmat (2019)
