= Čierny Brod =

Čierny Brod Vízkelet
- Municipality
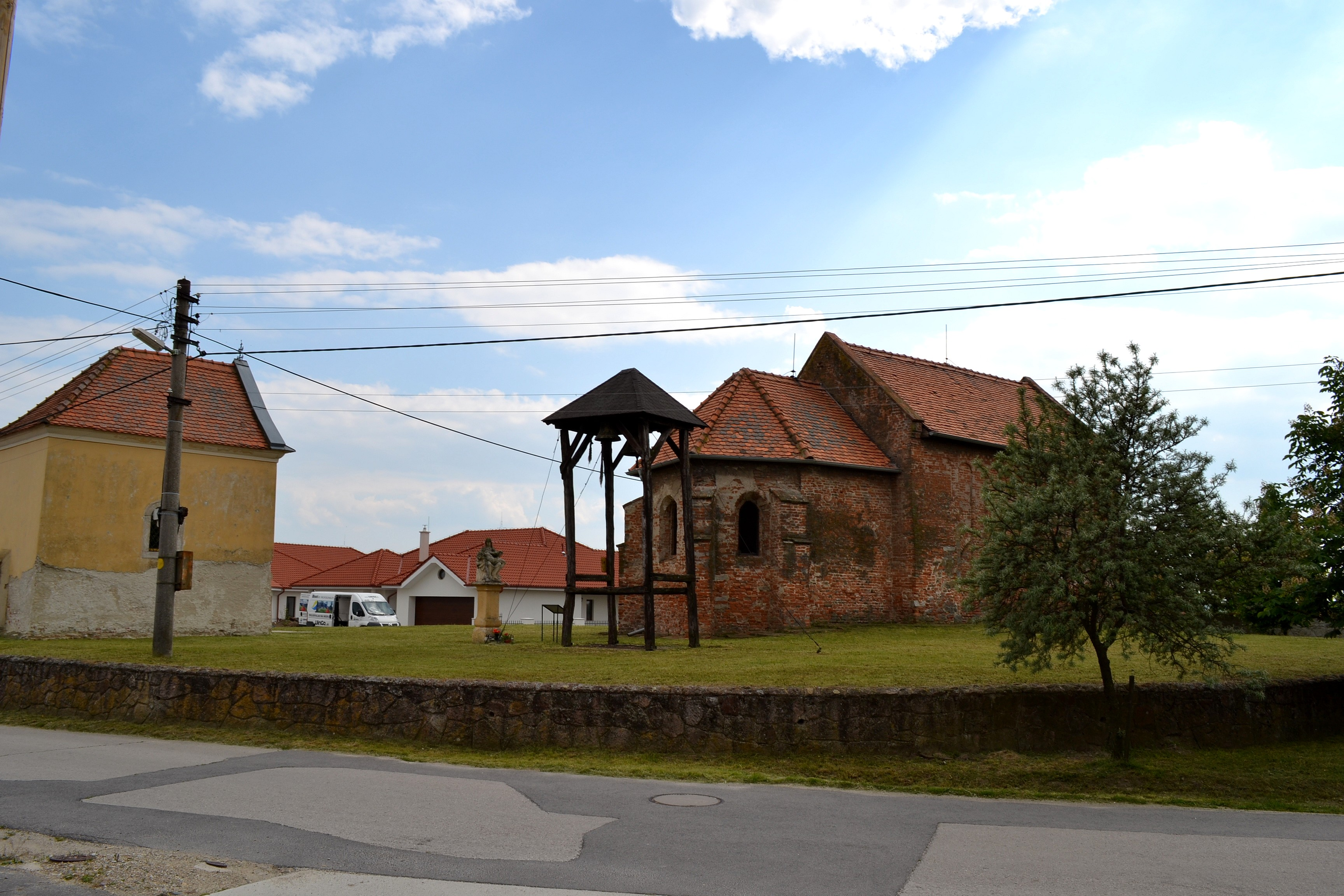

- Location of Čierny Brod in the Trnava Region Location of Čierny Brod in Slovakia
- Coordinates: 48.15°N 17.66°E
- Country: Slovakia
- Region: Trnava Region
- District: Galanta District
- First mentioned: 1223

Government
  - Mayor: Pál Nagy

Area
  - Total: 17.69 km^{2} (6.83 sq mi)
- Elevation: 118 m (387 ft)

Population (2025)
  - Total: 1,613
- Time zone: UTC+1 (CET)
  - Summer (DST): UTC+2 (CEST)
- Postal code: 925 08
- Area code: +421 31
- Vehicle registration plate (until 2022): GA
- Website: ciernybrod.sk

Čierny Brod (Hungarian: Vízkelet) is a village and municipality in Galanta District of the Trnava Region of south-west Slovakia.

== Geography ==
The municipality lies at an altitude of 118 metres (387 ft) and covers an area of 17.69 km^{2} (6.83 sq mi) (2025).

== History ==
The territory was already a part of the Kingdom of Great Moravia, the first Slavic state ever, when, after weakening battles with the Frankish Empire, in the 9th century, the eastern part of Great Moravia was occupied by nomadic Magyar tribes. The territory of the village became part of the Kingdom of Hungary, later acknowledged by the Frankish Empire. In historical records the village was first mentioned in 1223. Before the establishment of independent Czechoslovakia in 1918, it was part of Pozsony County. After the Austro-Hungarian army disintegrated in November 1918, Czechoslovak troops occupied the area, later acknowledged internationally by the Treaty of Trianon. Between 1938 and 1945 Čierny Brod once more became part of Miklós Horthy's Hungary through the First Vienna Award. From 1945 until the Velvet Divorce, it was part of Czechoslovakia. Since then it has been part of Slovakia.

== Population ==
Population statistic (10 years)
Year	1995	2005	2015	2025
Count	1542	1554	1611	1613
Difference		+0.77%	+3.66%	+0.12%

Population statistic
Year	2024	2025
Count	1620	1613
Difference		−0.43%

It has a population of 1613 people (31 December 2025).

=== Ethnicity ===
Census 2021 (1+ %)
Ethnicity	Number	Fraction
Hungarian	1188	72.21%
Slovak	423	25.71%
Not found out	91	5.53%
Total	1645	

In year 2021 was 1645 people by ethnicity 1188 as Hungarian, 423 as Slovak, 91 as Not found out, 13 as Romani, 7 as Czech, 4 as Other, 1 as Jewish, 1 as Italian and 1 as Romanian.

Note on population: The difference values of population numbers in the table "Population statistic" and in the sections "Ethnicity" & "Religion" is caused by the use of various statistical methods.

=== Religion ===
Census 2021 (1+ %)
Religion	Number	Fraction
Roman Catholic Church	1257	76.41%
None	239	14.53%
Not found out	67	4.07%
Evangelical Church	29	1.76%
Greek Catholic Church	18	1.09%
Total	1645	

In year 2021 was 1645 people by religion 1257 from Roman Catholic Church, 239 from None, 67 from Not found out, 29 from Evangelical Church, 18 from Greek Catholic Church, 12 from Christian Congregations in Slovakia, 6 from Old Catholic Church, 5 from Calvinist Church, 5 from Buddhism, 1 from Paganism and natural spirituality, 1 from Other and not ascertained christian church, 1 from Islam, 1 from Other, 1 from Hinduism, 1 from Apostolic Church and 1 from Ad hoc movements.

== Genealogical resources ==
The records for genealogical research are available at the state archive "Statny Archiv in Bratislava, Slovakia"

- Roman Catholic church records (births/marriages/deaths): 1777-1892 (parish B)
- Lutheran church records (births/marriages/deaths): 1701-1896 (parish B)
- Reformated church records (births/marriages/deaths): 1787-1924 (parish B)

== See also ==
- List of municipalities and towns in Slovakia
