= Brode =

Brode may refer to:

== People ==
- Ben Brode, American video game designer
- Charles Brode (died 1901), American merchant
- Harold L. Brode, American physicist
- Robert Brode (1900-1986), American physicist
- Wallace R. Brode (1900-1974), American chemist

== Places ==
- Brode, Škofja Loka, Škofja Loka, Slovenia
- Brode, Vransko, Vransko, Slovenia
- Brøde Island, off the southern tip of South Georgia

== See also ==
- Broda (disambiguation)
- Braude (disambiguation)
- Broder
