= Broido =

Broido is a surname. Notable people with the surname include:

- Eva Broido (1876 or 1878–1941), Russian revolutionary, Secretary of the Central Committee of the Menshevik Party
  - Daniel Broido (1903–1990), Russian-British engineer, son of Eva
  - Vera Broido (1907–2004), Russian-born writer and a chronicler of the Russian Revolution, daughter of Eva
- Lucie Brock-Broido (1956–2018), American author of four collections of poetry

== See also ==
- Braude, Broido, Broyde/Broide, Broydo
