= Braude =

Braude is a surname. Notable people with the surname include:

- Anna Braude Heller (1888–1943), Polish pediatrician
- Jim Braude (born 1949), American journalist
- Leopold Janno Braude, native name of the inventor of the Brodie helmet
- Marvin Braude (1920–2005), American politician
- Oliver Braude (born 2004), Norwegian footballer
- Semion Braude (1911–2003), Ukrainian physicist and radio astronomer
- Stephen E. Braude (1945–2026), American philosopher

== See also ==
- Braude (crater)
- Broda (disambiguation)
- Brode (disambiguation)
- Broder
- Braude, Broido, Broyde/Broide, Broydo
