= Santa Monica High School =

Public school in California, United States

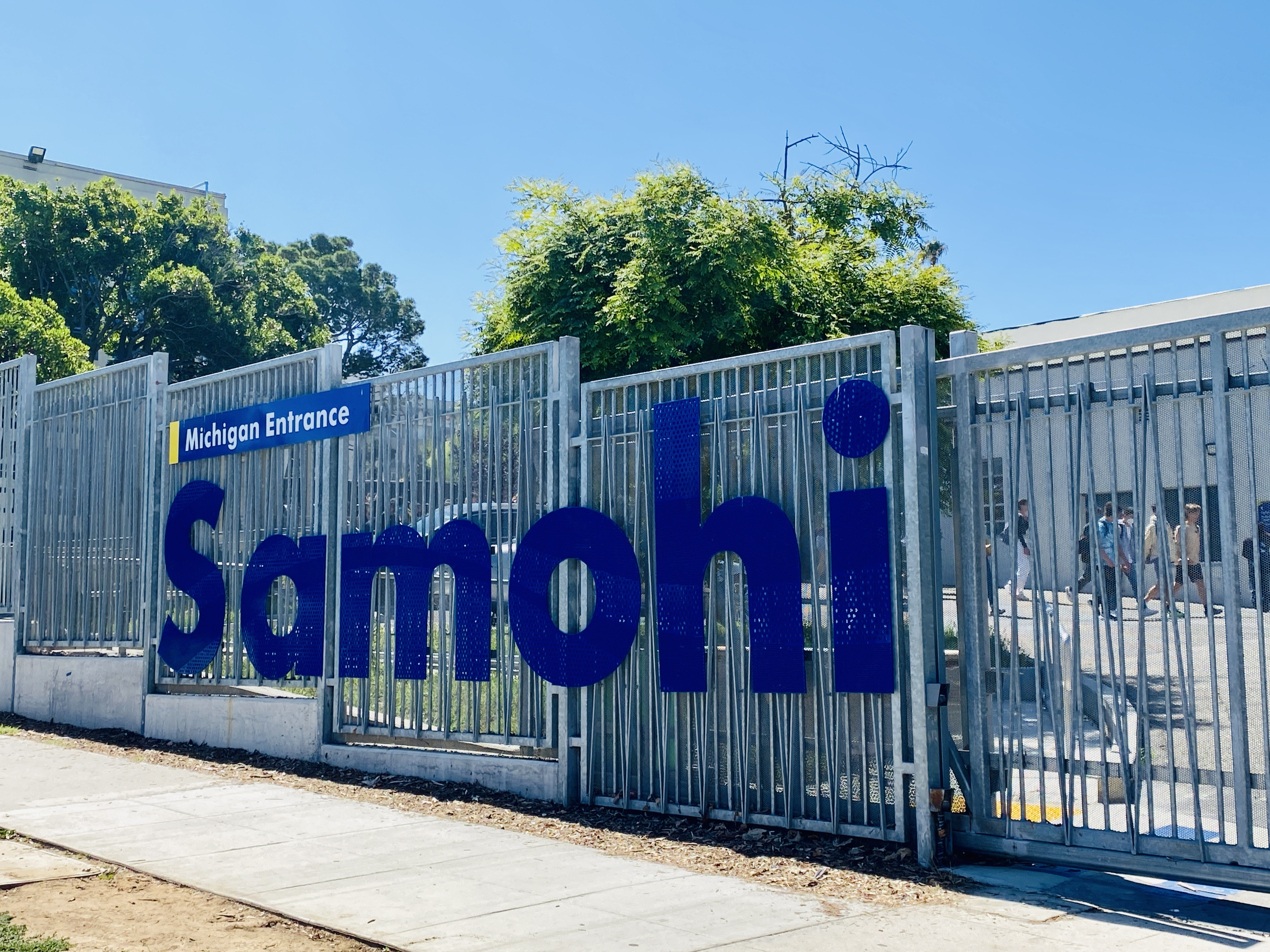
- Samohi entrance gate on Michigan Avenue

Location
- 601 Pico Boulevard; Santa Monica, California 90405; United States; 34.0116°N 118.4850°W

Information
- Type: Public
- Motto: Sincerity, Maturity, Honor and Service
- Established: 1891; 135 years ago
- School district: Santa Monica–Malibu Unified School District
- NCES District ID: 063570006102
- Principal: Mrs. Marae Cruce
- Staff: 135.06 (on an FTE basis)
- Enrollment: 2,573 (2023–24)
- Student to teacher ratio: 19.05
- Colors: Blue and gold
- Mascot: Viking
- Website: samohi.smmusd.org

Santa Monica High School, officially abbreviated to Samohi or SMHS, is a public high school in Santa Monica, California. Founded in 1891, it changed location several times in its early years before settling into its present campus at 601 Pico Boulevard. It is a part of the Santa Monica–Malibu Unified School District.

As of the 2021–22 school year, the school had 2,806 students and 131.11 teachers of a full-time employee basis for a teacher-student ratio of 21.08, according to data by the National Center for Education Statistics.

== History ==
=== 19th century ===
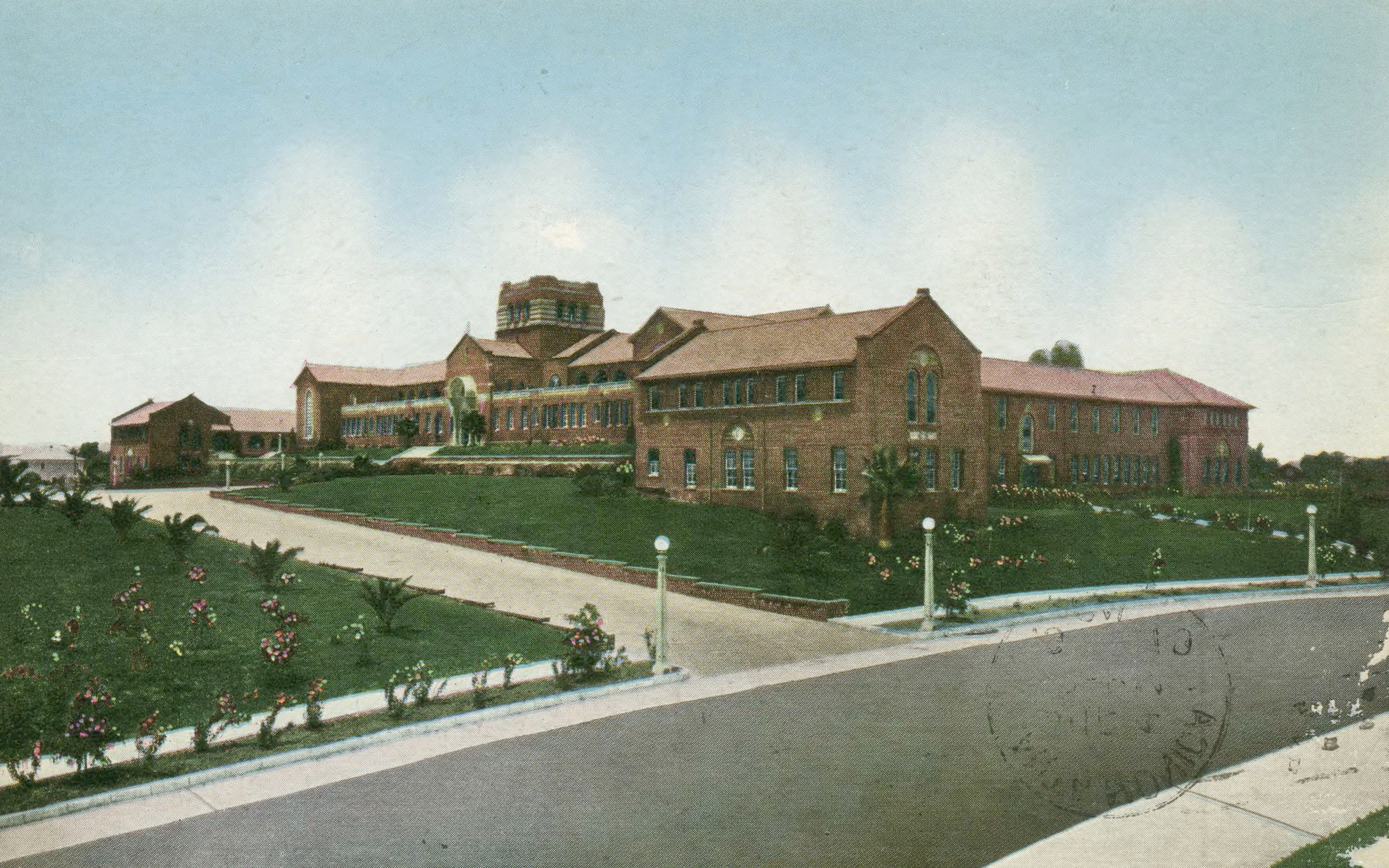
A postcard photo of Santa Monica High School c. 1919

In 1891, the Union High School Law was passed in Santa Monica, thereby establishing a four-year high school for the city. The first graduating class graduated in 1894.

=== 20th century ===
The new campus opened in 1912 with one building, the current History Building, with an enrollment of 50 students. The school sits on the hilltop between 4th and 7th streets and Pico and Olympic Blvds., from which one can see the Pacific Ocean. Ten years later, the campus was expanded with the construction of the English building.

In 1921, the Open Air Memorial Theater, now called the Greek Amphitheatre, was built to honor the Santa Monicans who served in World War I. One of the best examples of the classical Greek style in Southern California, the amphitheater was built after Santa Monica passed a $30,000 bond measure to fund its construction. Barnum Hall Theater, originally called the Auditorium, was built in 1937 by the Works Progress Administration (WPA) to be the Civic Auditorium of Santa Monica and host school events. The campus added six buildings during this period: the Language, English, Business, History, Administration, and Music Buildings.

In 1952, Santa Monica High School was finally expanded to its current size, 33 acres (130,000 m^{2}), and two new buildings were constructed: the Science and Technology D.M. Buildings. As the school aged, renovations took place in Barnum Hall, and the Music Building was completely rebuilt.

=== 21st century ===
The Innovation Building was constructed along with an outdoor gathering space, the Centennial Plaza, and was ready by the start of the 2015–16 school year.

The Discovery Building, including a new pool and cafeteria, was constructed and ready by the start of the 2021–22 school year.

The History Building was demolished in the summer of 2021 and its replacement, the Exploration Building, was constructed and ready by the start of the 2024–25 school year.

The South Gym was demolished in 2024, and its replacement, the Gold Gym, opened the same year, a few months after the Exploration Building.

The Business Building is scheduled for demolition in the summer of 2026, and its replacement, the Student Services Building, will be completed by the start of the 2028–29 school year.

== Houses ==
In 2003, Samohi adopted a house system similar to college house systems, in which each student is part of a house. There are four houses: S, A, M, and O. Upon enrollment at Santa Monica High School, students are randomly assigned to a house unless the student has already had a sibling at Samohi. In that case, the student has the option to join the house their sibling is in, or to join a new one. The S House office is stationed in the English Building, the A house office is stationed in the Innovation Building, and the M and O house offices are both stationed in the Discovery Building. A principal oversees each of the houses, along with two counselors and an office assistant.

== Academics ==
The school also has an academic team which won the 2008 National Science Bowl competition as well as the 2017 National Ocean Sciences Bowl. Additionally, the quiz bowl team remains competitive in the Southern California circuit.

== Music department ==
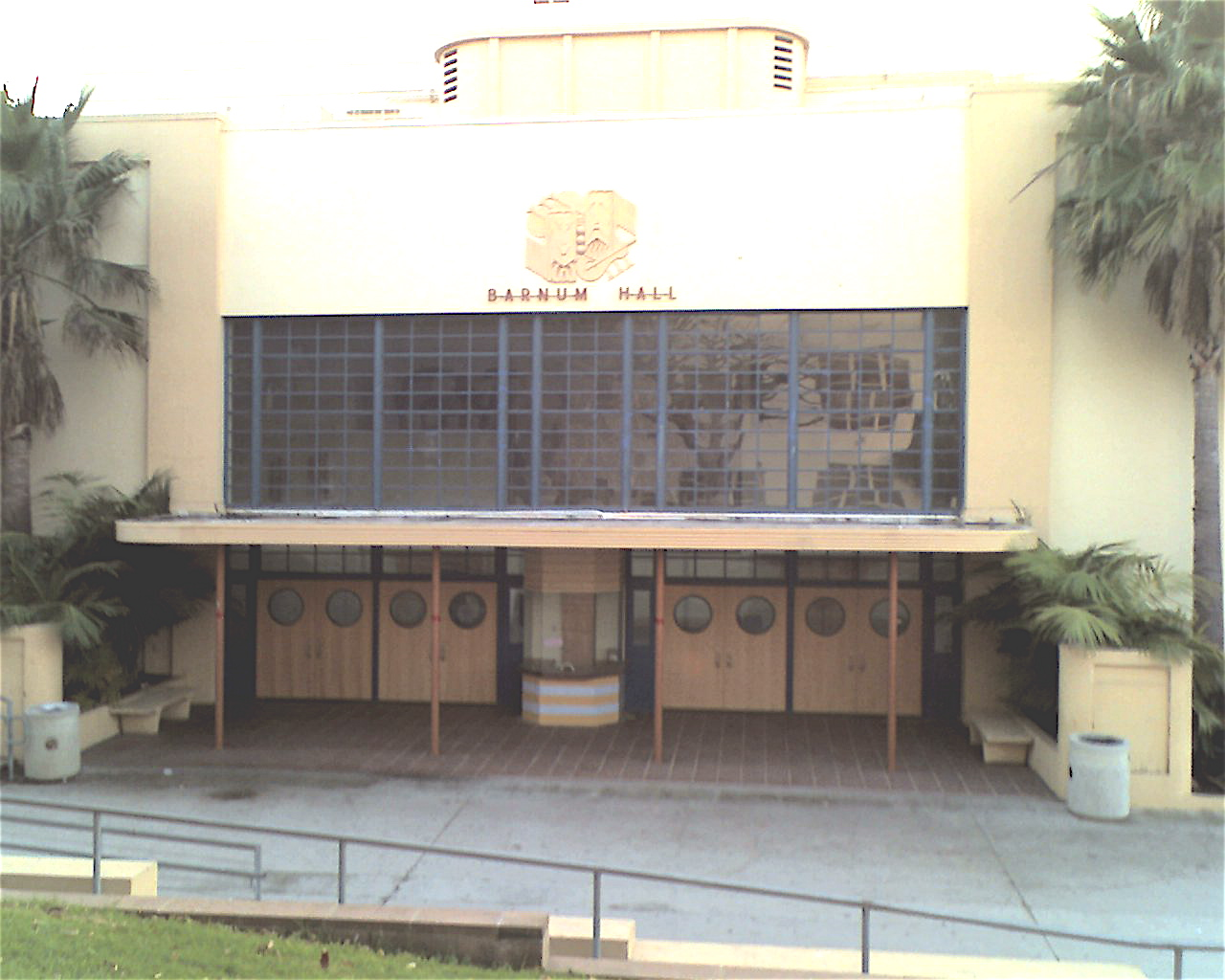
The front of Barnum Hall

=== Orchestral program ===
In 2005, Symphony Orchestra was labeled the best high school-level orchestra in the nation by the American String Teachers Association (ASTA) at the National Orchestra Festival in Reno, Nevada. The orchestra program is made up of many different ensembles, ranging from the smaller Beginning Strings / String Orchestra to the large Symphony Orchestra. Many of the orchestras from Santa Monica High School have had the chance to travel around the nation and the world. In February 2006, Symphony Orchestra became the first public high school orchestra to perform in the Walt Disney Concert Hall in Downtown Los Angeles.

=== Marching band ===
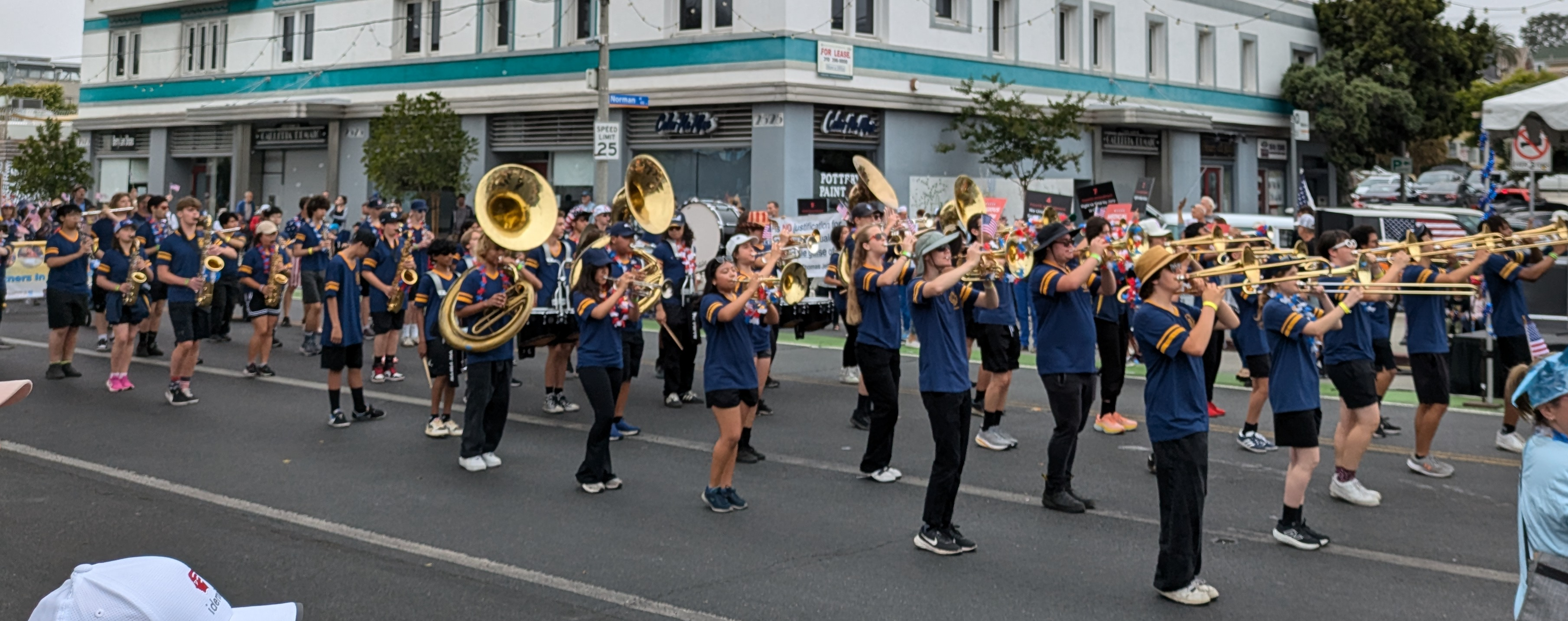
Santa Monica High School marching band at the 2024 Santa Monica Fourth of July parade

The Santa Monica High School Viking Marching Band (VMB) is one of the oldest high school marching bands in the state of California. The marching band performs for home football games and for many school and community events. The band has a long history of competing in parades and field shows, most notably in events sponsored by the Southern California School Band and Orchestra Association (SCSBOA). In 2006, the marching band qualified for the first time in the SCSBOA 5A division championship.

=== Concert band ===
Samohi currently offers five concert bands, with the Wind Ensemble recognized as one of the most exceptionally talented high school bands in California. The Wind Ensemble performed at Carnegie Hall in 2007 and 2015, as well as Chicago Symphony Hall in 2013. In 2016, the Wind Ensemble was selected to perform at the California All-State Music Educator's Conference (CASMEC) in San Jose. All ensembles regularly perform in festivals, conferences, and invitationals. The program enrolls over 300 students.

== Athletics ==
=== Basketball ===
The Girls Varsity team won the 2010 California Interscholastic Federation (CIF) Southern Division 1 championship, defeating Summit High, 69–63. It was the first girls' basketball title for SAMOHI; they went on to Round 4 of State and lost by two.

The Boys Varsity team won the 2013 CIF Division 1A Southern Section Championship against El Toro High School 66–56 at the Anaheim Convention Center. They entered the Division 1 State Championship as a #1 seed, losing in the championship game, 73–57, to Pleasant Grove. They also made it to the finals of the 2010 CIF Southern Division 1 Championship, but they were defeated at the Honda Center against Luezinger, and they went on to lose in round 2 of state.

=== Cross country ===
As of 2019, the cross-country team competes in division 1 of CIF.

=== Wrestling ===
The wrestling team won the CIF State Championship in 1986. Also won the CIF State Championship in 152 lb (69 kg) weight class in 2007. For the past seven years, the team has qualified individuals for the Southern Section CIF Masters and CIF State Championships.

=== Softball ===
The Lady Vikings have been undefeated in league games since 2004. In 2010 and 2014, the Lady Vikings won CIF Division IV Southern Section.

=== Color guard ===
Samohi's color guard and winter guard team performs in shows sponsored by Winter Guard International and Winter Guard Association of Southern California (WGASC). Originally a joint drill team with Santa Monica College named the "Coronettes", the team uses both wooden guns and flags in its routines, which are featured during halftime of every home football game. Additionally, after three years of membership, each participant receives a varsity letter. The team won gold medals in the WGASC championships in 2014, 2015, and 2016.

== Notable alumni ==
- Art Alexakis (class of 1980), lead singer of Everclear
- Ben Allen (class of 1996), California state senator
- Lita Albuquerque (class of 1963), artist
- Sam Anno, former NFL linebacker
- Lee Arenberg, actor
- Dirk Blocker, actor
- Joan Blondell, actor
- Don Bluth (class of 1955), filmmaker and animator
- Randolph Bresnik (class of 1985), NASA astronaut
- Harold L. Brode (class of 1941), nuclear-weapons-effects physicist
- Patrick Burleigh, screenwriter
- Dean Cain, actor
- Carson Daly (class of 1991), television host and personality
- Ken Darby (class of 1927), composer and lyricist; also composed school's fight song
- Robert Downey Jr., actor (did not graduate)
- John Ehrlichman, lawyer and political advisor to Nixon during the Watergate era
- Emilio Estevez, actor, director, screenwriter, producer
- Frank Finch, sportswriter for the Los Angeles Times; brother of Gloria Stuart
- Rhenzy Feliz, actor
- Paul Fleischman (class of 1970), children's author
- Glenn Ford, actor
- Spencer Freedman (born 1998), college basketball player for the Harvard Crimson and NYU Violets
- Henry Fukuhara (class of 1931), painter
- Lisa Gerritsen, actress
- James Griffith, actor, musician, screenwriter
- Christian Lee Hutson (class of 2009), singer-songwriter
- Anita Kanter (born 1933), tennis player
- Natas Kaupas (born 1969), professional skateboarder
- Jonny Kim (class of 2002), NASA astronaut
- Lorenzo Lamas, actor
- Tim Leary, baseball player
- Chad Lowe, actor & director
- Rob Lowe, actor
- Terrell Maze (class of 2002), former professional football player
- Stephen Miller (class of 2003), political advisor
- Rick Monday (class of 1963), Major League Baseball player and broadcaster
- Nathan Myhrvold (class of 1974), computer scientist and businessman
- Gene Nelson (class of 1938), actor
- William Overgard (class of 1944), cartoonist and novelist
- Damon Packard (class of 1985), actor & director
- Karyn Parsons (class of 1984), actress
- Sean Penn, actor
- Holly Robinson Peete, actress
- Eric Pop, engineer and professor
- Ronda Rousey, UFC Women's Bantamweight Champion
- Liane Sato (class of 1982), Olympic volleyball player and current volleyball coach at Samohi
- Terry Schofield, basketball player and coach
- Charlie Sheen, actor
- Tyler Skaggs, Major League Baseball player
- Cecil Smith (class of 1935), longtime critic and columnist for the Los Angeles Times
- Jan Steckel (class of 1980), poet and writer
- Gloria Stuart, actress
- Jubilant Sykes (class of 1972), opera singer
- Heather Thomas (class of 1975), actress
- Sandra Tsing Loh (class of 1979), writer and actress
- Madison Tung, wrestler, military officer, and Rhodes Scholar
- Robert Wagner, actor
- Jane Wickline (class of 2017), comedian, Saturday Night Live cast member
