= Raoul Hausmann =

Austrian photographer and sculptor (1886–1971)

- Raoul Hausmann, taken by Hannah Höch, 1919
- Born: Raoul Hausmann; July 12, 1886; Vienna, Austria-Hungary
- Died: February 1, 1971 (aged 84); Limoges, France
- Known for: Collage, Photography, Sculpture, Poetry, Performance, Theory
- Notable work: Mechanical Head [The Spirit of Our Age], c. 1920
- Movement: Dada

Raoul Hausmann (July 12, 1886 – February 1, 1971) was an Austrian artist and writer. One of the key figures in Berlin Dada, Hausmannn's experimental photographic collages, sound poetry, and institutional critiques had a profound influence on the European avant-garde in the aftermath of World War I.

== Early biography ==
ABCD (Self-portrait) A photomontage from 1923–24

Raoul Hausmann was born in Vienna but moved to Berlin with his parents at the age of 14, in 1901. His earliest art training was from his father, a professional conservator and painter. He met Johannes Baader, an eccentric architect and another future member of Dada, in 1905. At around the same time he met Elfride Schaeffer, a violinist, whom he married in 1908, a year after the birth of their daughter, Vera. That same year Hausmann enrolled at a private Art School in Berlin, where he remained until 1911.

After seeing expressionist paintings in Herwarth Walden's gallery Der Sturm in 1912, Hausmann started to produce expressionist prints in Erich Heckel's studio and became a staff writer for Walden's magazine, also called Der Sturm, which provided a platform for his earliest polemical writings against the art establishment. He initially welcomed the war, believing it to be a necessary cleansing of a calcified society. As an Austrian citizen living in Germany, he was spared the draft.

Hausmann met Hannah Höch in 1915 with whom he had an extramarital affair and "artistically productive but turbulent bond" that lasted until 1922, when she left him.The relationship's turmoil even reached the point where Hausmann fantasized about killing Höch. He talked down to her about her opinions on everything from politics to art, and only came to her aid when the other artists of the Dada movement tried to exclude her from their art shows. Even after defending her art and arguing for its inclusion in the First International Dada Fair, he went on to say that Höch "was never part of the club." Though Hausmann repeatedly told Höch that he was going to leave his wife to be with her, he never did.

In 1916, Hausmann met psychoanalyst Otto Gross, who saw psychoanalysis as preparation for a revolution, and the anarchist writer Franz Jung, who influenced his view of "destruction as an act of creation." His artistic circle included the writer Salomo Friedlaender, Hans Richter, Emmy Hennings and members of Die Aktion magazine, which, along with Der Sturm and the anarchist paper Die Freie Straße published numerous articles by him in this period.

== Berlin Dada ==
When Richard Huelsenbeck, a 24-year-old medical student who was a close friend of Hugo Ball and one of the founders of Dada, returned to Berlin in 1917, Hausmann was one of a group of young disaffected artists that began to form the nucleus of Berlin Dada around him. Huelsenbeck delivered his "First Dada Speech in Germany", January 22, 1918 at the fashionable art dealer IB Neumann's gallery, Kurfürstendamm Berlin. Over the course of the next few weeks, Hausmann, Huelsenbeck, George Grosz, John Heartfield, Jung, Höch, Walter Mehring and Baader started the Club Dada. The first event staged was an evening of poetry performances and lectures against the backdrop of a retrospective of paintings by the establishment artist Lovis Corinth at the Berlin Sezession, April 12, 1918. Amongst the contributors, Huelsenbeck recited the Dada Manifesto, Grosz danced a "Sincopation" homaging Jazz, whilst Hausmann ended the evening by shouting his manifesto The New Material In Painting at the by-now near riotous audience;

"The threat of violence hung in the air. One envisioned Corinth's pictures torn to shreds with chair legs. But in the end it didn't come to that. As Raoul Hausmann shouted his programmatic plans for dadaist painting into the noise of the crowd, the manager of the sezession gallery turned the lights out on him."

=== Photomontage ===
The phoneme kp' erioUM 1919

The call for new materials in painting bore fruit later the same year when Hausmann and Höch holidayed on the Baltic Sea. The guest room they were staying in had a generic portrait of soldiers, onto which the patron had glued photographic portrait heads of his son five times.

"It was like a thunderbolt: one could – I saw it instantaneously – make pictures, assembled entirely from cut-up photographs. Back in Berlin that september, I began to realize this new vision, and I made use of photographs from the press and the cinema." Hausmann, 1958

The photomontage became the technique most associated with Berlin Dada, used extensively by Hausmann, Höch, Heartfield, Baader and Grosz, and would prove a crucial influence on Kurt Schwitters, El Lissitzky and Russian Constructivism. It should also be pointed out that Grosz, Heartfield and Baader all laid claim to having invented the technique in later memoirs, although no works have surfaced to justify these claims. He is more frequently credited with inventing photomontage than Hoch is and that he was both physically and emotionally abusive of her.

At the same time, Hausmann started to experiment with sound poems he called "phonemes" and "poster poems", originally created by the chance lining up of letters by a printer without Hausmann's direct intervention. Later poems used words which were reversed, chopped up and strung out, then either typed out using a full range of typographical strategies, or performed with boisterous exuberance. Schwitters' Ursonate was directly influenced by a performance of one of Hausmann's poems, "fmsbwtazdu", at an event in Prague in 1921.

=== Der Dada: a new periodical ===
Cover of der Dada vol1, including a poem, "Dadadegie", by Baader and Hausmann 1919

After Hausmann contributed to the first group show, held at Isaac Neumann's Gallery, April 1919, the first edition of Der Dada appeared in June 1919. Edited by Hausmann and Baader, after receiving permission from Tristan Tzara in Zurich to use the name, the magazine also featured significant contributions from Huelsenbeck. The periodical contained drawings, polemics, poems and satires, all typeset in a multiplicity of opposing fonts and signs.

At the beginning of 1920, Baader, the "Oberdada", Hausmann, the “Dadasoph", and the "Welt-Dada" Huelsenbeck undertook a six-week tour of Eastern Germany and Czechoslovakia, drawing large crowds and bemused reviews. The programme included primitivist verse, simultaneous poetry recitals by Baader and Hausmann, and Hausmann's "Dada-Trot (Sixty-One Step)" described as 'a truly splendid send-up of the most modern exotic-erotic social dances that have befallen us like a plague...'

=== The First International Dada Fair, 1920 ===
Organised by Grosz, Heartfield and Hausmann, the fair was to become the most famous of all Berlin Dada's exploits, featuring almost 200 works by artists including Francis Picabia, Hans Arp, Ernst and Rudolf Schlichter, as well as key works by Grosz, Höch and Hausmann. The work Tatlin At Home, 1920, can be clearly seen in one of the publicity photos taken by a professional photographer; the exhibition, whilst financially unsuccessful, gained prominent exposure in Amsterdam, Milan, Rome and Boston. The exhibition also proved to be one of the main influences on the content and layout of Entartete Kunst, the show of degenerate art put on by the Nazis in 1937, with key slogans such as "Nehmen Sie DADA Ernst", "Take Dada Seriously!", appearing in both exhibitions.

=== The Mechanical Head ===
Mechanical Head (The Spirit of Our Time), assemblage circa 1920

The most famous work by Hausmann, Mechanischer Kopf (Der Geist Unserer Zeit), "The Mechanical Head (The Spirit of Our Time)", c. 1920, is the only surviving assemblage that Hausmann produced around 1919–20. The Spirit of Our Time is a collage of some sort by Raoul Hausmann, created in 1919, that shows an abstract, mechanical representation of modern man. The work combines photomontages, newspaper clippings and texts to explore themes of technology and the human experience in post-war Germany. Constructed from a hairdresser's wig-making dummy, the piece has various measuring devices attached including a ruler, a pocket watch mechanism, a typewriter, some camera segments and a crocodile wallet.

"Der Geist Unserer Zeit – Mechanischer Kopf specifically evokes the philosopher George Wilhelm Friedrich Hegel (1770–1831). For Hegel...everything is mind. Among Hegel's disciples and critics was Karl Marx. Hausmann's sculpture might be seen as an aggressively Marxist reversal of Hegel: this is a head whose "thoughts" are materially determined by objects literally fixed to it. However, there are deeper targets in western culture that give this modern masterpiece its force. Hausmann turns inside out the notion of the head as seat of reason, an assumption that lies behind the European fascination with the portrait. He reveals a head that is penetrated and governed by brute external forces.

== After Dada ==
Montage von Sechs Lichtstudien vom Jahre 1931, montage printed in 'Camera' periodical, 1941–42

=== Friendship with Schwitters ===
Huelsenbeck finished his training to become a doctor in 1920 and started to practice medicine; by the end of the year he had published the Dada Almanach and The History of Dadaism, two historical records that implied that Dada was at an end. In the aftermath, Hausmann's friendship with Kurt Schwitters deepened, and Hausmann started to take steps toward International Modernism. In September 1921, Hausmann, Höch, Schwitters and his wife Helma undertook an 'anti-dada' tour to Prague. As well as his recitals of sound poems, he also presented a manifesto describing a machine "capable of converting audio and visual signals interchangeably, that he later called the Optophone". After many years of experimentation, this device was patented in London in 1935. He also took part in an exhibition of photomontages in Berlin in 1931, organised by César Domela Nieuwenhuis.

In the late 1920s, he re-invented himself as a fashionable society photographer, and lived in a ménage à trois with his wife Hedwig and Vera Broido in the fashionable district of Charlottenburg, Berlin. Hannah Höch - by now herself living with a woman, the Dutch author Til Brugman – left a sketch of Hausmann around 1931:

"After I had offered to renew friendly relations and we met frequently (with Til as well). At the time he was living with Heda Mankowicz-Hausmann and Vera Broido in Kaiser-Friedrich-Straße in Charlottenburg. Elfrided Hausmann-Scheffer, Til and I went there often. But I always found it very boring. He was just acting the photographer, and the lover of Vera B, showing off terribly with what he could afford to buy now – the ésprit was all gone." Hannah Höch

In later years, Hausmann exhibited his photographs widely, concentrating on nudes, landscapes and portraits. As Nazi persecution of avant-garde artists increased, he emigrated to Ibiza, where his photos concentrated on ethnographic motifs of pre-modern Ibizan life. He returned to Czechoslovakia in 1937, but was forced to flee again in 1938 after the German invasion. He moved to Paris, then Peyrat-le-Château, near Limoges, living there illegally with his Jewish wife Hedwig, in a quiet, secluded manner, until 1944 . After the Normandy landings in 1944, the pair finally moved to Limoges.

The war over, Hausmann was once again able to work openly as an artist. He resumed correspondence with Schwitters with the aim to collaborate on a poetry magazine, PIN, but Schwitter's death in 1948 stopped the project. He published books about Dada, including the autobiographical Courier Dada, (1958). He also worked on "photograms", photomontages and sound poetry, and even returned to painting in the Fifties.

=== Revival of interest in Dada ===
In the 1950s there was a revival of interest in Dada, especially in America. As interest grew, Hausmann began corresponding with a number of leading American artists, discussing Dada and its contemporary relevance. He refuted the term Neo-Dada, currently in vogue, which had been applied to a number of artists including Yves Klein and the Nouveau Réalistes, Robert Rauschenberg and Fluxus.

'His almost complete isolation was relieved only by extensive and partly conflict-ridden correspondence with old friends from the Dada movement as well as young writers and artists such as Jasper Johns, Wolf Vostell and Daniel Spoerri.'

He wrote to George Maciunas, who had included his work in the early Fluxfests, in 1962:

"I think even the Americans should not use the term "neodadaism" because neo means nothing and ism is old-fashioned. Why not simply "Fluxus"? It seems to me much better, because it's new, and dada is historic. I was in correspondence with Tzara, Hulsenbeck and Hans Richter concerning this question, and they all declare "neodadaism does not exist"... So long."

He died on February 1, 1971, in Limoges. His last work, the book, Am Anfang war Dada, was published posthumously in 1972.

== Scientific interests and technical work ==
In addition to his work as an artist, Hausmann was interested in science and technology throughout his career, especially emerging fields like television and sound film, and Einstein's work on relativity (which Hausmann rejected). In 1929, he received a patent for a "device for monitoring body cavities and tubes," which today we would call an endoscope (patent number DRP473166). While researching light and electronics for his artworks, Hausmann collaborated with a Russian engineer Daniel Broido to design a computer that used similar technology. The device was granted a patent by the British patent office in 1934 (patent number GB446338).

== Documentary and Artistic Estate ==
=== Berlinische Galerie ===
In addition to the documentary partial estate, the collection of the Berlinische Galerie in Berlin (Germany) also includes works of art by Hausmann. In addition to early paintings, these include around 60 works on paper from the years 1911 to 1930 as well as over 350 photographic works.

The documentary part of the estate was acquired by the museum in 1992 and focuses on evidence of Raoul Hausmann's life and activities in Berlin up to his emigration in 1933, as well as correspondence with his wife Elfriede and his daughter Vera Hausmann up to Raoul Hausmann's death.

In addition to biographical documents, the partial estate consists largely of correspondence. These document, among other things, Hausmann's intellectual exchange with contemporaries, including Johannes Baader, Adolf Behne, César Domela-Nieuwenhuis, Otto Freundlich, Werner Gräff, Franz Jung, Ludwig Mies van der Rohe, László Moholy-Nagy, Hans Richter, Franz Roh, Kurt Schwitters, Arthur Segal and Franz Wilhelm Seifert. Typewritten business correspondence has been preserved as carbon copies and reply letters.

In addition, manuscripts and texts by Hausmann (and third parties) on art, culture and philosophy, as well as technical and scientific studies, have survived in the partial estate.

The focus of the literary texts is the novel manuscript Hyle, whose stages of development are documented by manuscripts and typescripts.

In 2019, the Hausmann collection was expanded through a donation by the German universal artist Timm Ulrichs (1940–2026). The documentary collection comprises Ulrichs' correspondence with Hausmann from 1967 to 1970, enriched with drafts of Hausmann's texts.

=== Musée d’Art Contemporain de la Haute Vienne Rochechouart ===
The Musée Départemental d'Art Contemporain[fr] at Rochechouart Castle in France holds the second part of Raoul Hausmann's documentary estate. In 1993, the museum acquired the largest part of Hausmann's correspondence from the 1940s until his death in 1971, around 6,000 letters. In 1995, this part of the documentary estate came to the museum together with a large number of unpublished texts, including theoretical and poetic writings, typescripts and notebooks. In 1996, the purchase of more than 1,200 photographic negatives and contact sheets further supplemented the holdings at the museum in Rochechouart.

== Bibliography ==
- Raoul Hausmann : Kamerafotografien, 1927–1957 / Andreas Haus.Schirmer-Mosel, c1979.
- Hausmann, Raoul and Schwitters, Kurt; ed. Jasia Reichardt. PIN, Gaberbocchus Press (1962); Anabas-Verlag, Giessen (1986).
- Collages, Hannah Höch 1889-78, Institute for Foreign Cultural Relations,1985
- Kurt Schwitters, Center Georges Pompidou, 1994
- Dada, Dickerman/ Sabine T Kriebel, National Gallery of Art Washington, 2006
- Hausmann at Artchive
- Cut and Paste, a History of Photomontage
