= Broydo =

Broydo is a Yiddish surname. Notable people with the surname include:

- Grigory Broydo (1883–1956), Tajik Soviet politician
- Kasriel Broydo (1907–1945), Lithuanian songwriter, singer, and coupletist

== See also ==
- Braude, Broido, Broyde/Broide, Broydo
