= Broda =

Broda may refer to:

== Places ==
- Broda, Pomeranian Voivodeship, a village in north Poland
- Broda, a part of Neubrandenburg, Germany

== People ==
- Broda (surname)
- Broda Otto Barnes (1906–1988), American physician
- Broda Shaggi (born 1993), Nigerian comedian

== See also ==
- Brode (disambiguation)
- Braude (disambiguation)
- Broder
