= Broda (surname) =

Broda is a surname, which means "chin" in Polish. Notable people with the surname include:

- Ana Casas Broda (born 1965), Mexican photographer
- Abraham ben Saul Broda (c. 1640–1717), Bohemian rabbi
- Christian Broda (1916–1987), Austrian politician
- Dave Broda (1944–2010), Canadian politician
- Engelbert Broda (1910–1983), Austrian scientist, brother of Christian
- Hal Broda (1905–1989), American football player
- Jan Broda (born 1940), Czechoslovak athlete
- Joel Broda (born 1989), Canadian ice hockey player
- Kamil Broda (born 2001), Polish footballer
- Marzena Broda (born 1965), Polish poet
- Martine Broda (1947–2009), French poet
- Turk Broda (1914–1972), Canadian ice hockey player
