= Broyde =

Broyde or Broide (Yiddish: ברוידא) is a Yiddish surname. Notable people with the surname include:

- Isaac Broydé (1867–1922), Russian orientalist and librarian
- Michael Broyde (born 1964), American rabbi and legal scholar
- Sholem Yankev Broyde (1836–1917), birth name of Mendele Mocher Sforim, Belarusian Jewish author
- Simcha Zissel Broide (1912–2000), Israeli rabbi
- Suse Broyde (fl. 1940–2016), American chemical biologist
- Zvi Hirsh Broide (fl. 19th century), Lithuanian Orthodox rabbi

== See also ==
- Braude, Broido, Broyde/Broide, Broydo
