= Madison Tung =

American military officer and academic

Maddy Goli-Tung
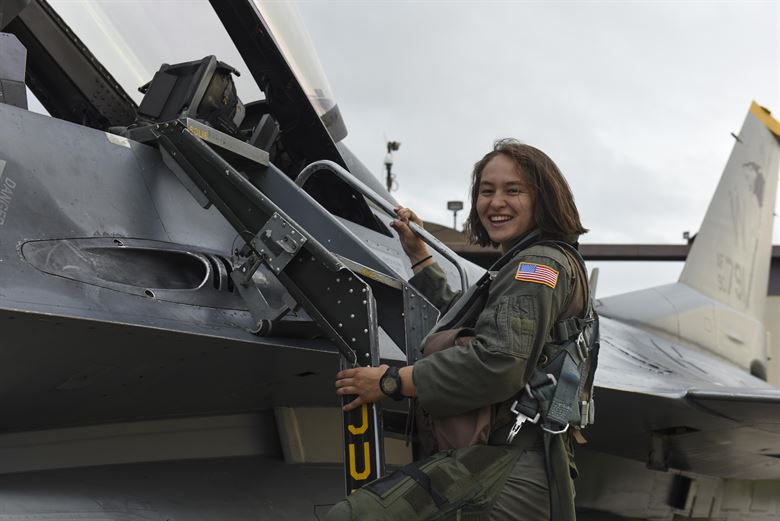
- Education: United States Air Force Academy (BS); Oriel College, Oxford (MSc)
- Amateur wrestling career
- Weight: 117 lb (53 kg)
- Style: Freestyle
- Club: Titan Mercury
- College team: U.S. Air Force Academy
- Coach: Mark Black; Marcie Van Dusen
Medal record
Representing United States
Austrian Ladies Open
Bronze medal – third place	2013	52 kg Freestyle
USA Wrestling Girls Nationals
Gold medal – first place	2014	117 lb Folkstyle

Madison "Maddy" Goli-Tung (née Tung) is a United States Air Force Officer, wrestler, and Rhodes Scholar who was the first woman to wrestle for the U.S. Air Force Academy men's team.

== Early life and wrestling ==
Tung is originally from Santa Monica, California, where she wrestled for Santa Monica High School and was a six-time All-American. Coached by 2008 Olympian Marcie Van Dusen, she won a bronze medal for Team USA at the 15th Austrian Ladies Open in 2013, competing at 52 kg. In 2014, Tung became a national champion at the USA Wrestling Girls Junior Folkstyle Nationals held in Oklahoma City in the 117 lb weight class.

== Career ==
After high school, Tung attended the United States Air Force Academy, where she majored in Mathematics and Humanities and minored in Chinese. She was the first female wrestler on the Air Force Academy men's wrestling team, and trained at the nearby Olympic Training Center as part of the National 2014 U.S. Women's Freestyle Team. She was named a Stamps Scholar, a Truman Scholar, a Schwarzman Scholar, a Marshall Scholar and a Rhodes Scholar at Oriel College, Oxford. On May 30, 2019, Tung graduated as a Distinguished Graduate with a Bachelor of Science and commissioned as an active-duty Air Force Officer, and was recognized by President Donald Trump in his commencement address.

== Personal life ==
Tung has a private pilot license and holds a Black Belt in Hapkido, a Korean martial art. Tung is married to Larissa Goli, a DPhil student at Keble College, Oxford, and adopted the joint family name Goli-Tung.
