= Martine Broda =

French poet, literary critic and translator

- Born: 17 March 1947; Nancy, France
- Died: 23 April 2009 (aged 62); Paris, France
- Resting place: Montparnasse Cemetery, Paris, France
- Occupations: Linguist, poet, translator, Literature Critic, writer
- Writing career
- Language: French
- Genre: Poetry
- Notable awards: Prix Mottart (1998)

Martine Broda (17 March 1947 in Nancy – 23 April 2009 in Paris) was a French poet, literary critic and translator.

== Biography ==
After studying literature and philosophy at the same time, Martie Broda has manly devoted herself to poetry, being part of the collective from the journal Action Poétique, and at the time of research at CNRS, her work focused on modern poetry. Beyond of her own poetic creations, she particularly known for her translations and commentary on the poetry of Paul Celan.

She is buried in Montparnasse Cemetery.

== Works ==
=== Poetry ===
- Éblouissements. Flammarion, 2003.
- Poèmes d'été. Flammarion, 2000.
- Huit Pages, about the Shoah in Robert Antelme. Gallimard, 1996.
- Poèmes d'Éblouissements in 29 femmes: une anthologie. Stock, 1994.
- Grand jour. Belin, 1994.
- Ce recommencement. Unes, 1992. (With Frédéric Benrath)
- Passage. Lettres de Casse, 1985.
- Tout ange est terrible. Clivages, 1983. (With André Marfaing)
- Double. La Répétition, 1978. (With Gisèle Celan-Lestrange)

=== Translations ===
- Paul Celan La Rose de personne / Die Niemandsrose, bilingual edition, Paris, Le Nouveau Commerce 1979. New edition, Paris, José Corti, 2002.
- Paul Celan Grille de parole, Paris, Christian Bourgois, 1991.
- Paul Celan Enclos du temps, Paris, Clivages, 1985.
- Nelly Sachs Énigmes en feu, in Eli, lettres, Énigmes en feu, Paris, Belin, 1989.
- Nelly Sachs Celle qui se met en quête, in Po&sie, n^{o} 69, Paris, Belin, 1994.
- T. S. Eliot East Coker, in Europe, n^{o} 830–831, June–July 1998.
- Walter Benjamin La Tâche du traducteur, dans Po&sie, n^{o} 55, Paris, Belin, 1991, p. 150-158.

=== Essays ===
- For Roberto Juarroz, Paris, José Corti, 2002.
- L'amour du nom, essay on lyricism and amorous lyric, Paris, José Corti, 1997 (Prix Mottart of the Académie française 1998)
- Dans la main de personne. Essay on Paul Celan, Paris, Cerf, coll. "La Nuit surveillée", 1986; then expanded reissue, Paris, Cerf, 2002
- Jouve, Paris, L'Âge d'homme et Cistre, 1981.
