= Annie Glen Broder =

British-Canadian musician

Annie Glen Broder (c. 1857 – 19 August 1937), was a British-Canadian teacher, singer, pianist, composer, lecturer and writer. She became a leading musician in Calgary, Alberta, Canada.

== Early life and career ==
She was born Eliza Ann Glen in Agra, India, a daughter of the Reverend William Glen, a missionary, and Eliza Harriet Davis. She was educated in England, and won a scholarship to the National Training School for Music, of which the principal was Arthur Sullivan; she was educated there as singer and pianist.

In the 1880s and 1890s she gave singing recitals, and performed as an accompanist. She gave lectures about piano accompaniment, with musical examples, in many cities in England, and in Dublin. Noting that there was no authoritative book on the subject, she published How to Accompany in 1893, expanded in 1894. She was music critic for British periodicals and newspapers; she had connections with people of the musical establishment.

== In Canada ==
About 1900 she married Richard W. C. Broder. He was an Irish widower, a former teacher in England; he had emigrated to Canada with his former wife, obtaining a land grant in 1890. Annie Glen joined him in Regina, where she was a teacher. John Stoughton Dennis Jr (1856–1938), former civil servant and now an official of the Canadian Pacific Railway, who as an amateur musician and producer of operettas worked with her on a production of HMS Pinafore, invited the Broders to move to Calgary with him in 1903, where Richard Broder became a rancher.

Annie Glen Broder soon became an important figure in the musical life of Calgary. She was organist at the Pro-Cathedral Church of the Redeemer, taught piano and voice, gave recitals, and was a music critic for the Calgary News-Telegram and later the Calgary Herald, reviewing performances by local musicians and visiting celebrities. In 1903 she worked with Dennis on the Canadian premiere of Samuel Coleridge-Taylor's cantata The Atonement. She gave talks on music and culture.

Her most popular composition was "The Ride of the North-West Mounted Police"; it was arranged for band by John Waldron, and printed in 1906. It was played for many years by bands of the Royal North-West Mounted Police. She also composed songs.

She made extended visits to England: she was a special correspondent for Canadian newspapers at the Coronation of Edward VII in 1902, at the Coronation of George V in 1911, and at the opening of Canada House in London in 1925.

Annie Glen Broder died in Calgary in 1937. The obituary in the Calgary Herald described her as "a figure of Victorian elegance, retaining a Dresden-like distinction until the end".
