= Robert Brode =

American physicist (1900–1986)

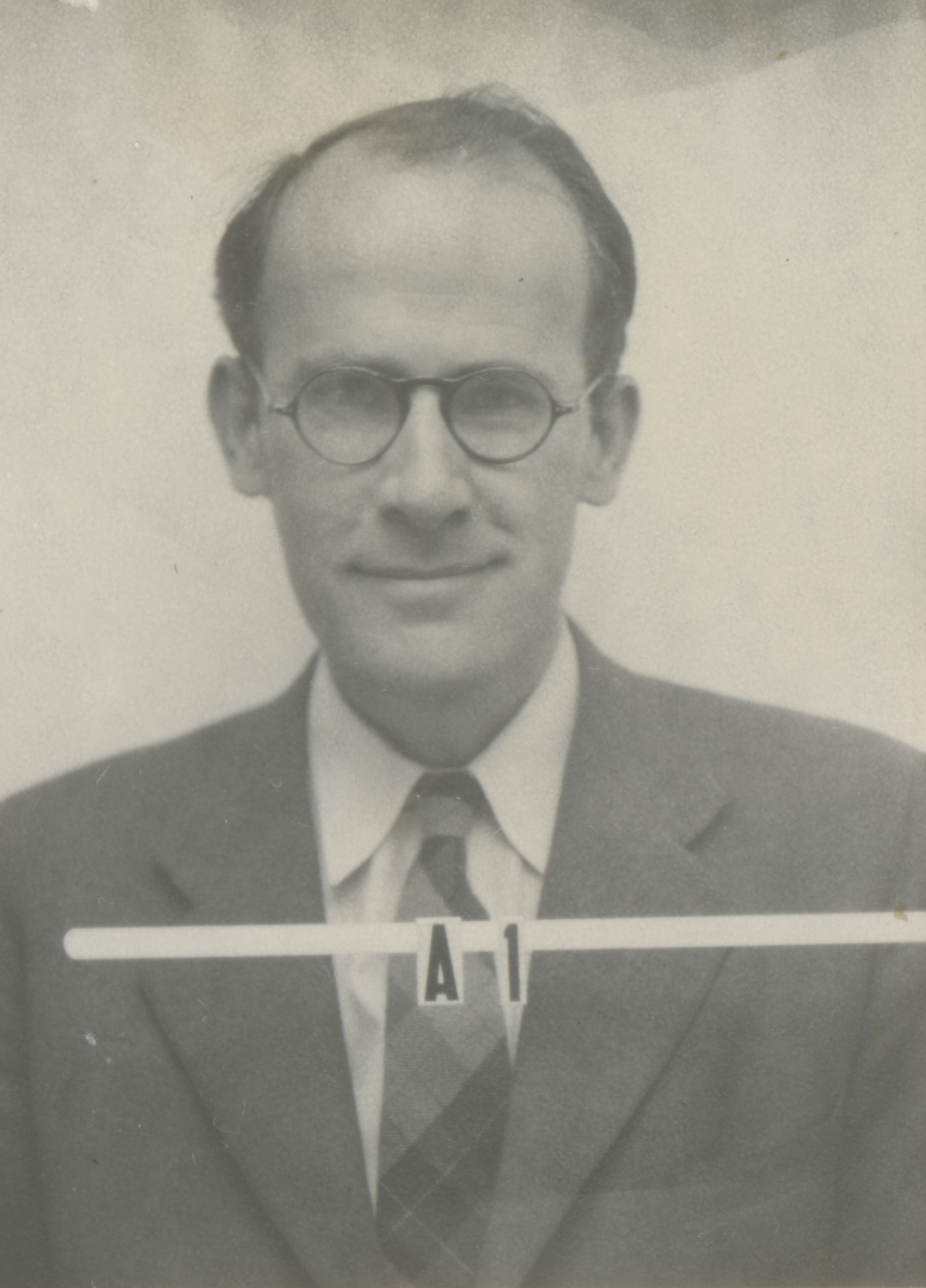
- Brode's ID badge photo from Los Alamos
- Born: June 12, 1900; Walla Walla, Washington, U.S.
- Died: February 19, 1986 (aged 85); Berkeley, California, U.S.
- Education: Whitman College (BS); California Institute of Technology (MS, PhD); Oriel College, Oxford
- Scientific career
- Fields: Physics
- Institutions: Los Alamos Laboratory; University of California, Berkeley
- Thesis: The Absorption Coefficient for Slow Electrons in Gases (1924)

Robert Bigham Brode (June 12, 1900 – February 19, 1986) was an American physicist, who during World War II led the group at the Manhattan Project's Los Alamos Laboratory that developed the fuzes used in the atomic bombing of Hiroshima and Nagasaki.

A graduate of the California Institute of Technology, where he earned his doctorate in 1924, Brode attended Oxford University on a Rhodes Scholarship and the University of Göttingen on a National Research Council Fellowship. During World War II, Brode worked at Johns Hopkins Applied Physics Laboratory, where he helped develop the proximity fuze and then as a group leader at the Los Alamos Laboratory. In 1950 he was one of a dozen prominent scientists who petitioned President Harry S. Truman to declare that the United States would never be the first to use the hydrogen bomb.

After the war, Brode returned to teaching at Berkeley. Between 1930 and 1957 he supervised 37 graduate students. In addition to his research and teaching, he occupied a number of other positions. He was the academic assistant to two presidents of the University of California, and sat on numerous advisory panels and boards.

== Early life and education ==
Robert Bigham Brode was born in Walla Walla, Washington, on June 12, 1900, the son of Howard S. Brode, a professor of biology at Whitman College, and his wife Martha Catherine née Bigham. He was the second of a set of quadruplets, being born between his brothers Wallace and Malcolm; the fourth child died within weeks of birth. They had an older brother, James Stanley. All four attended Whitman College, and went on to earn doctorates and have distinguished careers as scientists and academics.

Brode graduated from Whitman College with his Bachelor of Science degree in 1921, and then entered the California Institute of Technology. He was awarded his Doctor of Philosophy (Ph.D.) in physics in 1924, the first year in which Caltech awarded this degree, for his thesis on "the absorption coefficient for slow electrons in gases". He showed that molecules with similar arrangements of their external electrons have similar cross sections for collisions with slow electrons. These results could not be readily explained with classical physics, and their importance would not be realised until 1966.

On graduation, Brode became an Associate Physicist at the National Bureau of Standards. He was awarded a Rhodes Scholarship to study at Oriel College, Oxford, in England in 1924 and 1925, and then a National Research Council Fellowship to the University of Göttingen in Germany in 1925 and 1926, and then a research appointment at Princeton University from 1926 to 1927. On returning to the U.S. he married Bernice Hedley Bidwell on September 16, 1926. They had two sons.

Brode became an assistant professor of physics at the University of California, Berkeley, in 1927, and a full professor in 1932. He was awarded a Guggenheim Fellowship, which enabled him to return to England and study at Cambridge University and Birkbeck College, University of London, in 1934 and 1935. While there, he became friends with British physicist P.M.S. Blackett. He was impressed by Blackett's cloud chambers, and set his graduate students to work on projects using them, starting with Dale R. Corson.

== Manhattan Project ==
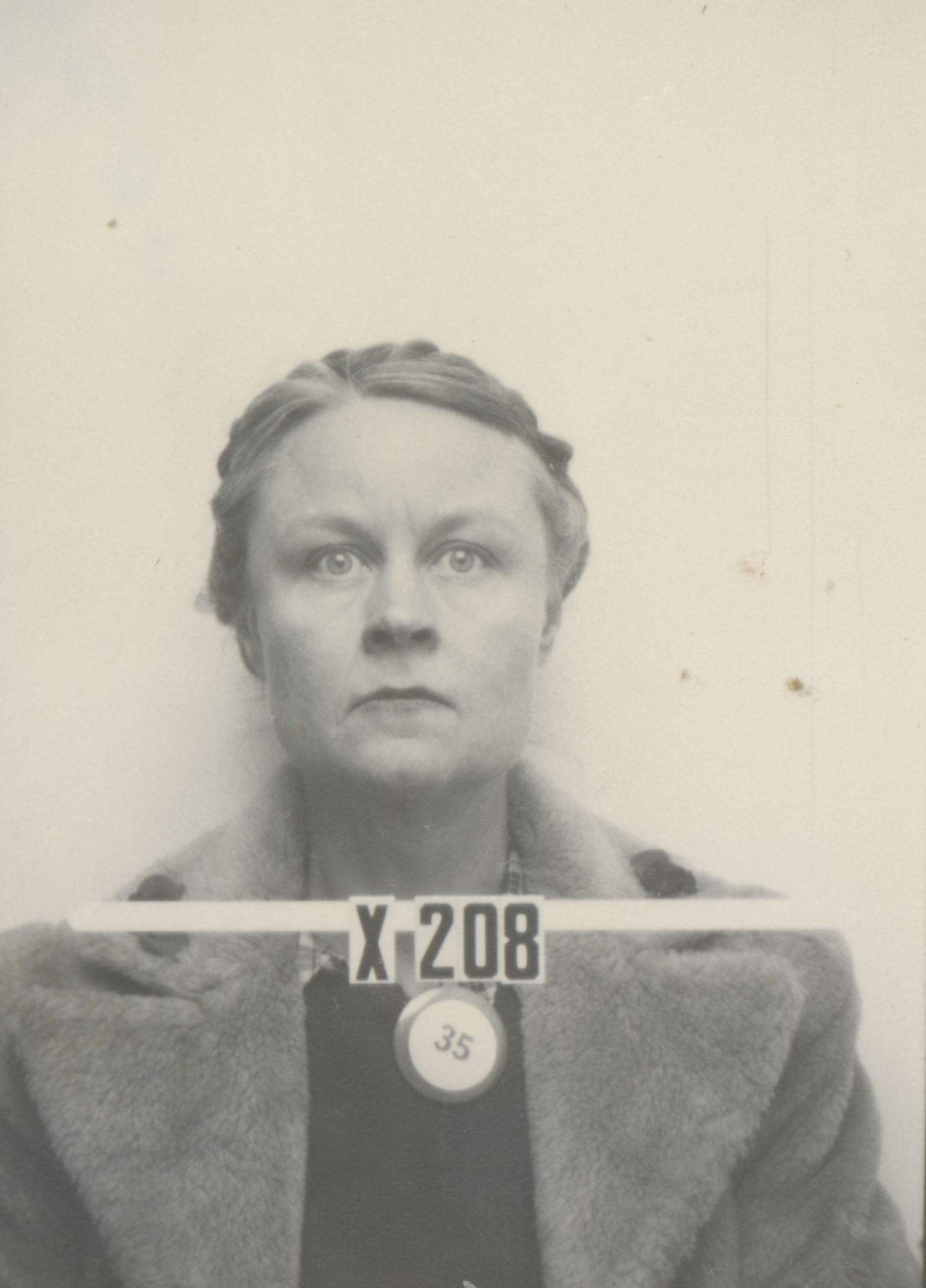
Bernice Brode's Los Alamos badge

In 1941, after the start of World War II, Brode went to work at Applied Physics Laboratory at Johns Hopkins University, where he helped develop the proximity fuze. In 1943, he moved with his family to the Manhattan Project's Los Alamos Laboratory, where he was appointed the leader of the E-3 Fusing Group. His wife Bernice was also hired to work at Los Alamos as a human computer in the T (Theoretical) Division. Brode's group consisted of 14 civilians, 12 military officers and 37 enlisted men of the Special Engineer Detachment. Its task was to develop a fuze that would detonate an atomic bomb at a specified height above the ground.

Normally, bombs are cheap and fuzes are relatively expensive, but an atomic bomb is extremely expensive, and any failure of a triggering device is unacceptable. On the other hand, for the same reason, fuzes can be employed that would be prohibitively expensive in a conventional bomb. Brode's E-3 group were tasked to develop a fusing mechanism that would have less than one chance in 10,000 of failing to detonate within 200 feet (61 m) of the required height. The required height was not initially known, as it depended on the yield, which was uncertain. The group investigated both radar proximity fuzes and barometric altimeter fuzes. Testing was carried out at the Naval Proving Ground in Dahlgren, Virginia in August 1943 and Muroc Army Air Field in March 1944 using dummy drops from barrage balloons. In the end, a modified APS-13 Monica tail warning radar known as "Archie" was employed, and the fuzes performed flawlessly in the atomic bombing of Hiroshima and Nagasaki.

== Later life ==
After the war, Brode returned to teaching at Berkeley. In 1950 he was one of a dozen prominent scientists who petitioned President Harry S. Truman to declare that the United States would never be the first to use the hydrogen bomb. In 1951 he returned to England for another year, this time at Manchester University as a Fulbright Scholar. Between 1930 and 1943, 15 graduate students conducted their research under his direction. He supervised another 22 between 1946 and 1957. The 37 students included Corson, who became president of Cornell University, and William B. Fretter, who was vice president of the University of California from 1978 to 1983.

In addition to his research and teaching, Brode occupied a number of other positions. He was the academic assistant to two presidents of the University of California, Clark Kerr from 1960 to 1965, and Charles J. Hitch from 1972 to 1973, and to Angus E. Taylor, the vice-president for academic affairs, from 1967 to 1972. He served on the selection panels for Rhodes, Fulbright and Kennedy scholarships, and for awards from the State Department, the Atomic Energy Commission and the Institute of International Education. He was chairman of the Advisory Board of the Naval Ordnance Test Station from 1948 to 1955, a member of the National Research Council Committee on Data for Science and Technology (CODATA) from 1951 to 1957, and chairman of the American Association of Physics Teachers and the American Institute of Physics' Committee on Physics Faculties in Colleges from 1962 to 1965.

At various times Brode was vice president of the International Union for Pure and Applied Physics and the American Association of University Professors, a member of the Council of the American Physical Society, president of the Pacific Division of the American Association for the Advancement of Science, chairman of the Physics Division of the National Research Council, associate director for research of the National Science Foundation, and the U.S. delegate to the International Council of Scientific Unions. He was acting director of the Berkeley Space Sciences Laboratory from 1964 to 1965 and director of the University of California's Education Abroad Program in the United Kingdom from 1965 to 1967.

Brode became a professor emeritus at Berkeley in 1967. He died at his home in Berkeley on February 19, 1986. He was survived by his wife Bernice and his son John. His papers are in the University of California's Bancroft Library.
