= Kasriel Broydo =

Latvian singer-songwriter

Kasriel Broydo (1907–1945) was a Jewish Lithuanian songwriter, singer and coupletist. He was born in Vilnius and played in various troupes and marionette-theaters. His lyrics and songs, like Hot zikh a zun aza breyte tseshpreytn (The sun has spread around), were the folk songs of his place and time.

After the first World War Broydo moved to France and continued to work in theater. When Germany invaded Poland, he returned to Vilna. He was an integral and cherished participant, as writer, director and actor, to almost all the revi-theater programs in the Vilna ghetto theaters. An example of his inspirational skill was Tsum besern morgn (Toward a better tomorrow), a 1943 song of hope which he wrote when it seemed the Soviet forces might prevail against the Germans.

His last program in the Vilna ghetto, called Moyshe, halt zikh (Hold on, Moyshe!), was almost ready for performance when, during the liquidation of the ghetto in September 1943, Broydo was seized by the Gestapo. He was taken to Estonia, where he and his friends, Sime and Marek Shapiro, although interred, created performances for their fellow inmates in the labor camp. It was at this time that Broydo became religious.

Broydo's song Bay undz iz shtendik finster (It's always dark for us), music by Henech Kon, written on a motif by Moishe Broderzon, was taken into Sh. Katsherginski's Lider fun di getos un lagern; the Vilna Ghetto Ensemble performed it in the revue Men kon gornit visn (One Never Knows).

Broydo's most famous song may be Tsi darf es azoy zayn? (Must it always be this way?) sung in revi-theaters in Poland before the Second World War. In 1945 he was sent to Königsberg, Germany (now Kaliningrad, Russia), where he and hundreds of other Jews were thrown in the Baltic Sea and drowned.

== More Broydo songs ==
- Geto, dikh fargesn vel ikh keyn mol nit (Ghetto, I'll never forget you)
- Es shlogt di sho (The hour has come)
- Moyshe halt zikh (Moyshe, hold on)
- Dos transport-yingl sung by the orphans of the Vilna ghetto
- Mir zaynen oykh fun fleysh un blut (We, too, are flesh and blood)
- Ez vet zikh fun tsveygl tseblien a boym (From a twig a tree will bloom) - also called Kinder fun geto - music by Yankl Trupianski
- Es benkt zikh, es benkt zikh (Longing) now known as Friling (Spring) from his revue Korene yorn un vey tsi di teg (years of corn and pain)
- Froyen (women) sung in the ghetto by Dora Rubina
- Yosl Un Sore Dvoshe to music by Fanny Gordon, sung by Mina Bern and Joseph Widetzky before World War II

== See also ==
- Chana Mlotek, "Kasriel Broydo - Makhber Fun Zinglider In Vilna Geto." Publisher: Yiddish Forward, June 27, 2005
