= Eva Broido =

Russian menshevik activist

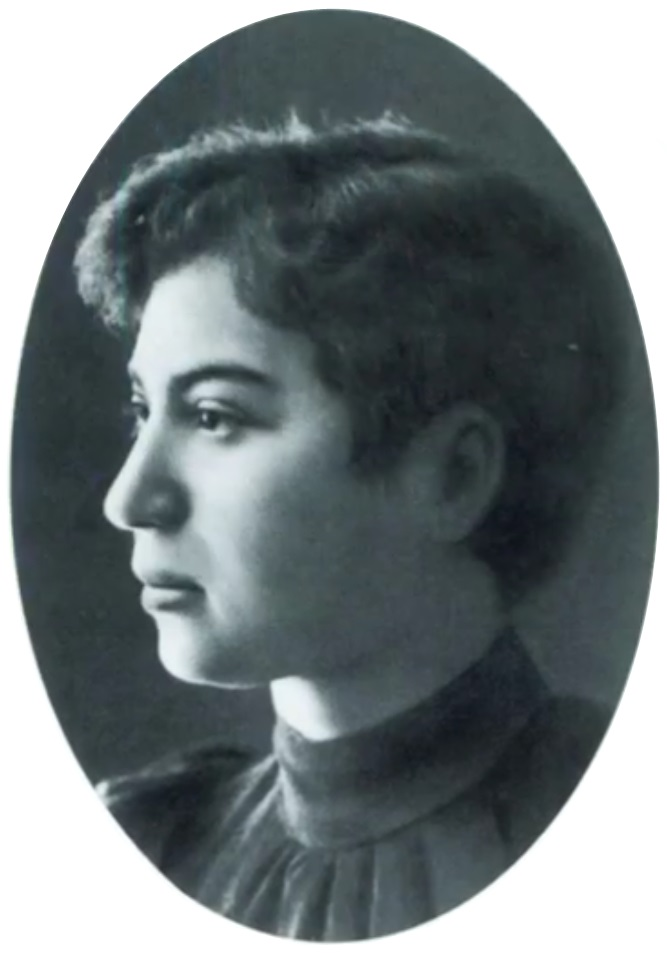
Eva Broido

Eva L'vovna Broido (née Khava Leibovna Gordon; 7 November 1876 – c. 15 September 1941) was a Russian political figure, social democrat, revolutionary, publicist, translator, and memoirist. In 1917 she was Secretary of the Central Committee of the Menshevik Party. A prominent Menshevik, she was executed in 1941 and rehabilitated posthumously.

== Life ==
=== Early years ===
Eva L'vovna Gordon was born in Švenčionys, Vilna Governorate on 7 November 1876, the daughter of a once wealthy but later impoverished Jewish bourgeois family. Her father was a Talmudic scholar, and her mother was engaged in the sale of timber.

She received her education in a primary Jewish school, and at the age of 15 completed four years of high school in Dorpat. She graduated from the Dorpat Pharmaceutical Institute and entered a pharmacy in Dvinsk. In 1912, she graduated from Kazan University and passed the exam to become an assistant pharmacist.

=== Revolutionary activities ===
In 1893-1896 she lived in Riga, where she moved in teachers' circles. In 1895 and 1896 she went to Berlin, where she became acquainted with the Social Democrats and with Social Democratic literature: Karl Kautsky's History of Socialism and August Bebel's Woman and Socialism, as a result of which she became a convinced socialist. That same year she joined the revolutionary movement.

In 1896-1898 she was married to Abram Edelman. In this marriage they had a daughter, Alexandra (Edelman; later Adasinskaya). By her own admission, these were “three years of private hell” and “the darkest years of my entire life,”.

In 1899, she moved to Saint Petersburg, where she became close with a group of Semyannikov workers, and then joined the Russian Social Democratic Labor Party (RSDLP), later joining its Menshevik faction. For some time, she worked for the newspaper Iskra, using her party nickname Natasha and also employing the literary pseudonyms of E. Bronskaya, E. Lvova, Berta Abramovna Vygotskaya, and Eva Lvovna Bronskaya. In 1899–1900, she translated Bebel’s book Woman and Socialism into Russian in 1899–1900, but the print run was destroyed by censors.

In early summer 1900, she participated in publishing the leaflets of a faction known as the Socialist group, which later merged with the Petersburg Group of the Rabocheye Znamya ("Workers Banner"), a Russian socialist newspaper published in St. Petersburg. She took part in the creation of the Social Democratic Workers’ Library group, was a member of the editorial board of its publications, and was the main link between the “library” and the Socialist group.

On the night of January 30, 1901, she was arrested in the so-called “Workers’ Library Case” for creating an illegal traveling library, distributing books about the labor movement abroad and about trade unions, and writing works on the “women’s question”. Having fallen ill while being held in the House of Pre-trial Detention, on August 8, 1901, she was released on bail and placed under police supervision in Śventsiany, where she formed and led a group of Social Democrats. She was arrested for unauthorized absence to Vilnius for literature, and from November 11, 1901 to January 2, 1902, she was held in Śventsiany Prison. After 15 months of imprisonment, she was administratively exiled to Eastern Siberia for five years.

In 1902, she married Mark Broido, a comrade in the revolutionary struggle; they were married during transit in the prison chapel. The couple had a daughter, Vera Broido, and a son, Daniel Broido.

In May 1902, she was sent to Kirensk with her husband, and in 1903 to Yakutsk. During her imprisonment she organized literacy circles for workers; one of Broido's students was Mikhail Kalinin, who went on to become the President of the Soviet Union and who learned to read and write from her.

She periodically worked as a pharmacist, including at a local dispensary in Yakutsk. She took an active part in the armed uprising of political exiles, the so-called "Yakutsk protest" or "Romanov case", and helped her comrades by delivering weapons and provisions from the outside. The trial of the "Romanovites" allowed her to serve her sentence at the place of imprisonment of her husband, who was sent to the Aleksandrovskaya prison.

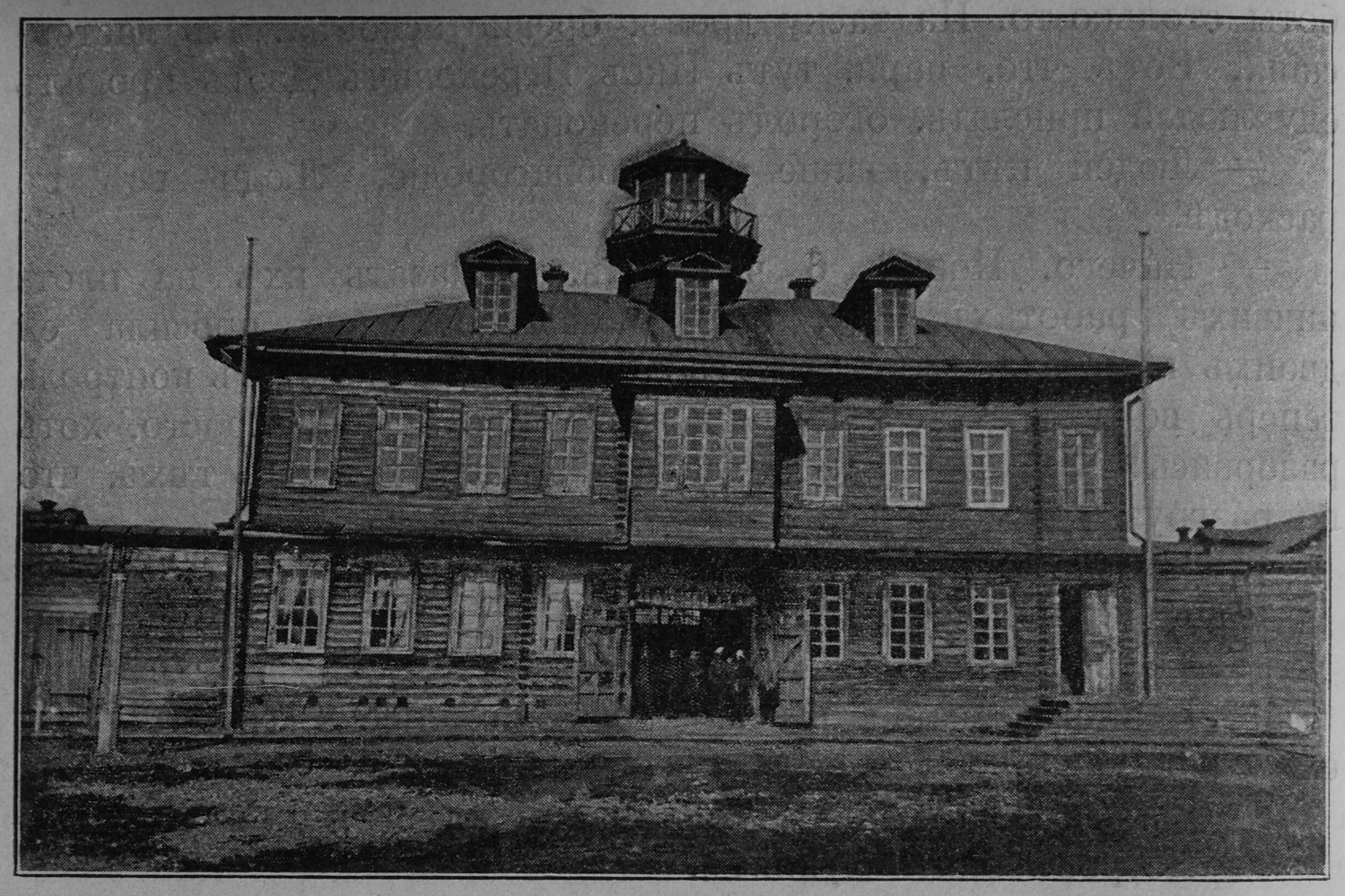
Aleksandrovskaya Prison in Alexandrovsk-Sakhalinsky in 1903

After her husband's escape, she was temporarily sent to the Verkholensky district of Irkutsk Governorate, but in the winter of 1904 she escaped from exile on the way, having spent a total of two years there. She emigrated to England and visited a number of European countries. In 1905, under the influence of the events of Bloody Sunday, she left for Geneva, from where she traveled to Baku in March 1905.

There she joined the "liquidators", who concentrated on the legal labor movement as a means to broaden the RSDLP's appeal and deepen its roots among the working class. Broido became one of the leaders of the Menshevik "Organization of Balakhani and Bibi-Heybat Workers" (later the "Union of Baku Workers"), publishing a weekly at an illegal printing house. Despite the patriarchal nature of local society, she enjoyed authority among the workers of the Baku oil fields

In 1906, she returned to St. Petersburg, where she participated in the activities of the Menshevik organization, created clubs of factory workers, wrote brochures, and translated the works of German Social Democrats.

=== Party leadership ===
In 1912, at the August conference of the RSDLP in Vienna, she was elected a member and secretary of the Menshevik Organizing Committee (equivalent to the Central Committee). She began working for the Menshevik newspaper Luch or "Sunbeam", which was published legally.

That same year, she took part in organizing elections to the State Duma of the 4th convocation. In 1912-1914, she was a member of the St. Petersburg "Initiative Group" of the Mensheviks, at a meeting of which in January 1913 she was arrested. In 1915, she was exiled to Siberia, taking two of her youngest children with her. She was sent to the Yenisei Governorate and then to Kirensk along the Trans-Siberian Railway. It was while in internal exile that she joined the "Minusinsk group" of Menshevik internationalists, headed by Fyodor Dan, that opposed the appeal by Georgy Plekhanov to the Social Democratic faction in the State Duma to vote for war credits to support the Russian Empire's participation in World War I.

=== Role in the Russian Revolution ===
In the spring of 1917, she returned to St. Petersburg, where she took up political work among women and wrote for the Menshevik press. After the February Revolution, she became a delegate to the May All-Russian Conference of the RSDLP. On August 25, at the Unification Congress of the party, she was elected to the bureau of the Central Committee of the RSDLP (o) from the internationalists, then became its secretary.

On August 30, at a meeting of the Central Committee of the RSDLP, she was approved as a member of the editorial board of the newspaper "Voice of the Worker". As a representative of the generation of female revolutionaries who enjoyed the support of their male comrades in the struggle for gender equality, Broido did any kind of work, from sewing dresses to translating. At that time, a united group of Mensheviks with a “women’s department” headed by Broido was the first of all parties to call for a conference of Petrograd women workers in October 1917. The conference adopted a resolution on the formation of special commissions for agitation and organization of women, but the matter did not go beyond good intentions. In the book “Woman Worker,” published in 1917 in Petrograd, Broido expressed her life and political outlook, appealing to working women with an appeal:

We must study; we must actively participate in trade unions and the Social Democratic Party. Now we do not have to wait for others to do something for us. We ourselves are called upon to forge our own destiny. We must take an active part in the local government elections, we must prepare for the elections to the Constituent Assembly. But at the same time we must remember that the interests of the working class as a whole, both male and female workers, are the same and that these interests oppose the interests of all other bourgeois classes.

She spoke out against the October Revolution and against recognizing the Bolshevik government. However, in late October and early November 1917, she supported negotiations with the Bolsheviks on the issue of creating a "homogeneous socialist government". Once, Broido shared the podium with Vladimir Lenin at the Baltic Shipyard. She did not like to orate, but she still came to support the Mensheviks in the fight against the Bolshevik candidate. Grigory Zinoviev was supposed to speak, but Lenin arrived unexpectedly, and Broido defeated him, putting the Menshevik candidate through in the vote. In December 1918, Broido was again elected to the Menshevik Central Committee and became its secretary.

After the Bolshevik government and the central committees of all the main political parties moved to Moscow, Broido and her family settled there in 1918. At that time, through the Society of Former Political Prisoners and Exiled Settlers, she was in close contact with Vera Figner, as well as with Vera Zasulich, her comrade from Iskra.

=== Emigration ===
In 1920, Broido left Russia with her daughter Vera via Poland to Vienna to find her husband. She did not inform the party leadership of her departure. Rafael Abramovich, David Dalin, and Yuli Martov were already abroad, while a significant part of the Menshevik Central Committee was arrested, namely Fyodor Dan, Boris Nikolaevsky, Sergei Yezhov, Artur Pleskov, and Fyodor Cherevanin.

Having settled in Berlin and becoming a member of the Foreign Delegation, Broido began working as a secretary of the editorial board of the émigré Menshevik journal Socialist Messenger. In the early 1920s, her memoirs were published in the Berlin magazine "Chronicle of the Revolution". During that period, she also translated "Secrets of the Soul" by H. G. Wells into Russian.

=== Return to the USSR, arrest, imprisonment, internal exile, execution and rehabilitation ===
In November 1927, with the help of Latvian Social Democrats, Broido traveled alone to the Soviet Union on Dan's initiative to work illegally. Upon arrival in Moscow, she tried to organize the distribution of the Socialist Messenger, other brochures and leaflets delivered to the USSR by diplomatic couriers of the Latvian embassy associated with the Latvian Social Democratic Party, employees of the printing houses "Pravda" and "Izvestia", as well as foreign business travelers. She traveled to Sormovo and Kharkov, where she met with local Mensheviks and party veterans who survived the defeat of the organization. Arriving in Baku to resume the activities of the underground group, she stayed at the apartment of the exiled Menshevik A. Ya. Rogachevsky, where she arranged a meeting with her local comrades.

On April 22, 1928, she was arrested on the way back, and the next day the other four participants in the meeting were arrested. At that time, there was a Menshevik underground in Soviet Russia; after Broido's arrest, a second emissary of the party from abroad, Mikhail Braunstein, was sent to the USSR, and was soon also arrested.

During the investigation, which was conducted first in Baku and then in Moscow, she initially assumed a false name and passport, but later admitted that she was Eva Broido, and tried to take on responsibility fr everything attributed to the "Baku group". Broido also stated that she had divorced her husband, which can be seen as an attempt to protect her family. Despite the criminal prosecution, her memoir book “In the Ranks of the RSDLP” was published in Moscow in 1928, and Broido’s biography was included in the dictionary “Figures of the Revolutionary Movement in Russia”, which noted that she "actively fought against the Soviet power".

On June 28, 1928, she was sentenced by the OGPU Collegium to three years in prison under the “anti-Soviet” Article 58 of the Criminal Code of the RSFSR. Until 1930, she was held in solitary confinement in the Suzdal political isolator, where she corresponded with her relatives, who sent her money and books. In April 1931, she was sentenced to five years of exile in Tashkent. In November 1935, she was exiled to Oirot-Tura on the Soviet-Mongolian border. On July 4, 1937, she was arrested again. On March 21, 1939, the Military Tribunal of the Moscow Military District sentenced Broido to 20 years in prison. On September 13, 1941, the Military Collegium of the Supreme Court of the USSR, following another review of the cases of prisoners of the Oryol prison, sentenced Broido to death by firing squad. She was shot on September 15 during the hasty evacuation of the Oryol Central Prison.

She was posthumously rehabilitated. Broido's daughter learned what had happened to her mother only after the fall of Soviet power and the opening of the archives. Broydo's archive, including biographical materials and the interrogation protocol from 1938, is kept in the Archive-Library of the St. Petersburg Scientific and Information Center of Memorial.

== Selected works ==
- In the Ranks of the R.S.D.L.P./ Preface by V. I. Nevsky, Moscow: Publishing House of the All-Union Society of Political Prisoners and Exiled Settlers, 1928.
- Memoirs of a Revolutionary, Oxford: Oxford University Press, 1967. (Ed. and transl. by Vera Broido.)
