= Daniel Broido =

Russian-British engineer

Daniel Broido (17 May 1903 – October 10, 1990) was a Russian-British engineer who played a significant role in the development of computers.

Daniel was born to Mark Broido and Eva (née Lwowna), while they were political exiled in Kirensk, Siberia. They had been active Mensheviks and Eva had translated Women under Socialism by August Bebel into Russian. In January 1901, while Eva was actively engaged with the illegal workers library, producing and distributing written material, she was arrested. After 15 months in prison, she was sentenced to three to five years in exile in Siberia. The family returned to St Petersburg illegally, where his sister Vera Broido was born in 1907.

He moved to Germany and studied mechanical engineering in Berlin, and found work as an engineer working for Rotaprint. In 1934, Rotaprint sent him to London, where he settled. He remained in the United Kingdom during the Second World War, working for Caterpillar Tractors during World War II.

== Career with LEO computers ==
In 1956, Broido was appointed by J. Lyons and Co. as Chief Mechanical Engineer to work on the LEO computer. He subsequently He subsequently became Eastern Europe Export Manager for English Electric Leo Marconi and played a significant role in obtaining a contract for a 360 computer which was installed in his presenceon 7 March 1966 by the Czechoslovak Minister of Transport, Alois Indra.
