= Wallace R. Brode =

American chemist

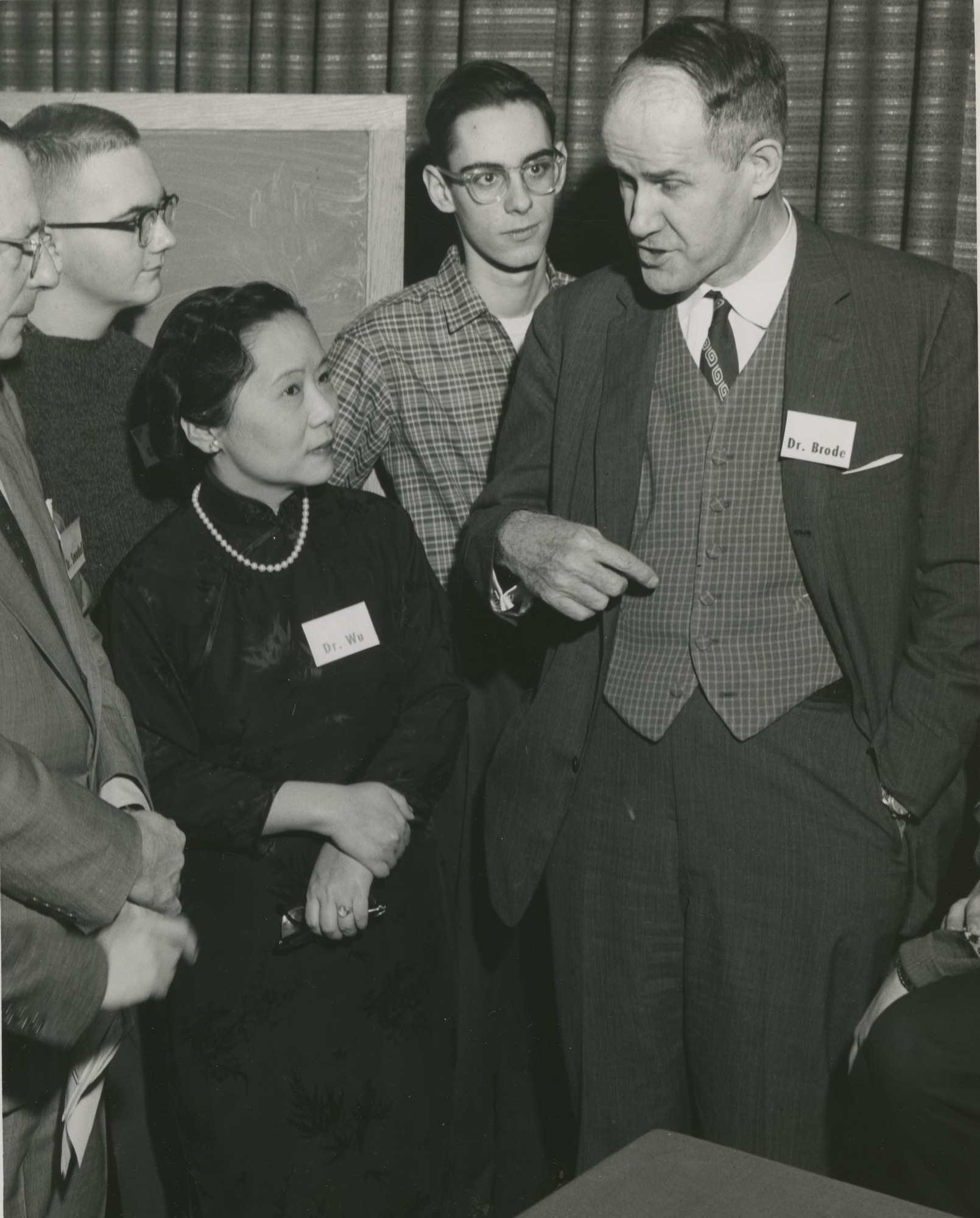
Chien-Shiung Wu (left) with Wallace Brode (right) at Columbia University in 1958.

Wallace Reed Brode (12 June 1900 – August 10, 1974) was an American chemist. He was president of the American Chemical Society in 1969 and of the Optical Society of America in 1961. He received the Priestley Medal in 1960.

== Biography ==
Brode was born in Walla Walla, Washington, one of male triplets, the others being brothers Malcolm and Robert, each of whom became a distinguished scientist. He also had another older brother, Stanley. His father, Howard, was a biology professor at Whitman College, where Brode would earn his D.Sc. in 1921. While studying for his Ph.D. at University of Illinois under Roger Adams, he developed a lifelong interest in dyes and spectroscopy.

He was on the faculty of Ohio State University (1928–48, professor 1939–48); head of the science department at US Naval Ordnance Test Station 1945–47; Science Adviser to the US Secretary of State 1958–60 and director of Barnes Engineering Co. in Washington from 1960 onwards. He also served on the board of trustees for Science Service, now known as Society for Science & the Public, from 1957 to 1972. He was president of the American Chemical Society in 1969 and of the Optical Society of America in 1961. He received the Priestley Medal in 1960.

During his career he developed molecular model sets, using wooden rods and balls to create three-dimensional representations of molecular bonds in chemical compounds.

== Publications ==
- Chemical Spectroscopy 1939
- (with others) Laboratory Outlines of Organic Chemistry 1940
- (with others) The Roger Adams Symposium 1955

== See also ==
- Optical Society of America#Past Presidents of the OSA
