= Braude (crater) =

Crater on the Moon

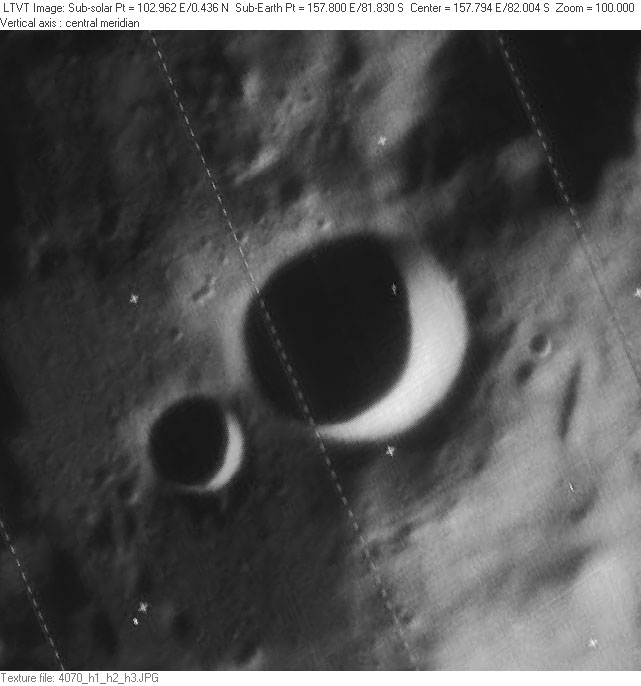
- Crater Braude from Lunar Orbiter
- Coordinates: 81.8°S 157.8°E
- Diameter: 11.28 km (7.01 mi)
- Eponym: Semion Braude

Braude is a lunar impact crater located on the far side of the Moon. The nearest major feature is the Schrödinger crater. Also located nearby is the Wiechert crater, which is less than 170 kilometers from the southern pole.

Braude was proposed in 2018 as the landing site for a potential Ukrainian mission to the Moon, specifically as the site of a landing probe.

This crater is named after Ukrainian radio astronomer Semion Braude (1911-2003). It was officiallyadopted by the International Astronomical Union on April 17, 2009.
