= Broder =

Broder or Bröder (Broeder) is a surname. Notable people with the surname Broder / Bröder include:

- Andrei Broder (born 1953), Research Fellow and Vice President of Emerging Search Technology for Yahoo!
- Andrew Broder (1845–1918), Ontario farmer and merchant, member of the Canadian House of Commons from 1896 to 1911
- Annie Glen Broder (1857–1937), Canadian musician
- Berl Broder (1817–1868), Ukrainian Jew and the most famous of the Broder singers
- David S. Broder (1929–2011), Pulitzer Prize-winning journalist, columnist for The Washington Post, and professor at the University of Maryland
- Gavin Broder (born 1959), former chief Rabbi of Ireland
- Henryk Broder (born 1946), German journalist, columnist for the daily newspaper Die Welt
- Iris Mai née Bröder (born 1962), German chess master
- Melissa Broder (born 1979), poet and writer
- Mirko Bröder (1911–1943), Hungarian–Serbian chess master
- Samuel Broder (born 1945), co-developer of anti AIDS drugs and former Director of the National Cancer Institute

== See also ==
- Broda (disambiguation)
