= Harold L. Brode =

American physicist

Harold Leonard Brode was a nuclear-weapons-effects physicist who pioneered computer simulations of nuclear explosions at the RAND Corporation in the 1950s. In 1951, he received his PhD from Cornell University where his supervisor was Hans A. Bethe. He is co-founder of R&D Associates, Vice-President of Strategic Systems at Pacific-Sierra Research Corporation and chairman of the U.S. Defense Nuclear Agency's Scientific Advisory Group for Effects (SAGE).

One of his critics commented in Physics Today, vol. 58: "Harold Brode probably knows more about nuclear weapons effects than any other person alive."

== Major publications ==
- 'Numerical Solution of a Spherical Blast Wave', Physical Review A, vol. 95 (1954), pages 658 et seq.
- 'Numerical Solutions of Spherical Blast Waves', Journal of Applied Physics, vol. 26 (1955), pages 766 et seq. (online RAND version: ).
- 'Cratering from a Megaton Surface Burst' (with R. L. Bjork), RAND Corporation, Research memorandum RM-2600, June 20, 1960 .
- 'A Review of Nuclear Explosions Phenomena Pertinent to Protective Construction' RAND Corporation, R-425-PR, May 1964, pages 63.
- Brode, H. L. (1968). "Review of Nuclear Weapons Effects". Annual Review of Nuclear Science. 18: 153–202. Bibcode:1968ARNPS..18..153B. doi:10.1146/annurev.ns.18.120168.001101.
