= Vera Broido =

Russian historian (1907–2004)

Vera Broido (7 September 1907 – 11 February 2004) was a Russian-born writer and a chronicler of the Russian Revolution, as one who grew up through it and lost her mother to its aftermath.

== Life ==
Vera Broido was born in Saint Petersburg in 1907, the daughter of two Russian Jewish revolutionaries. In 1914, when Broido was seven, her family was plunged into a life of isolation and fear when her mother, prominent Menshevik Eva Broido, was sentenced to exile in Western Siberia for taking a stand against the war. The memory of her stay in Siberia and her experiences there never left her. Broido left the wastes of Siberia for Germany, thanks to the efforts of her father Mark. She never saw her mother after Eva returned voluntarily to the Social-Democratic Party underground in Russia in 1927, and was later told that she had been executed.

During her time in Berlin in the 1920s, Broido met avant garde artist and Dadaist turned society photographer Raoul Hausmann and became his lover and muse, living in a ménage à trois with him and his wife Hedwig in the fashionable Charlottenburg district of Berlin between 1928 and 1934.

In 1941, Broido married British historian Norman Cohn. They had one son Nik Cohn, who went on to become a writer. When she came to the United Kingdom with her new husband, Broido carved a niche for herself among Russian emigres and went on to write books on women in revolution, the Mensheviks and her strongest work, an autobiography looking back on her childhood in Russia and her journey through Europe to the United Kingdom. After a stay in Derry in Northern Ireland, she later made her home in London and then in Wood End, Stevenage, East Hertfordshire. She died peacefully in 2004 at the age of 97 in Stevenage.

== Works ==
- Apostles into Terrorists: Women and the Revolutionary Movement in the Russia of Alexander II. Maurice Temple Smith Ltd 1978
- Lenin and the Mensheviks: The Persecution of Socialists under Bolshevism. Westview Press, 1987.
- Daughter of the Revolution: A Russian Girlhood Remembered. Constable, 1999.

=== As translator and editor ===
- Broido, Eva L’vovna. Memoirs of a Revolutionary. Oxford University Press, 1967.
