= List of songs recorded by Tori Amos =

Songs by American singer-songwriter

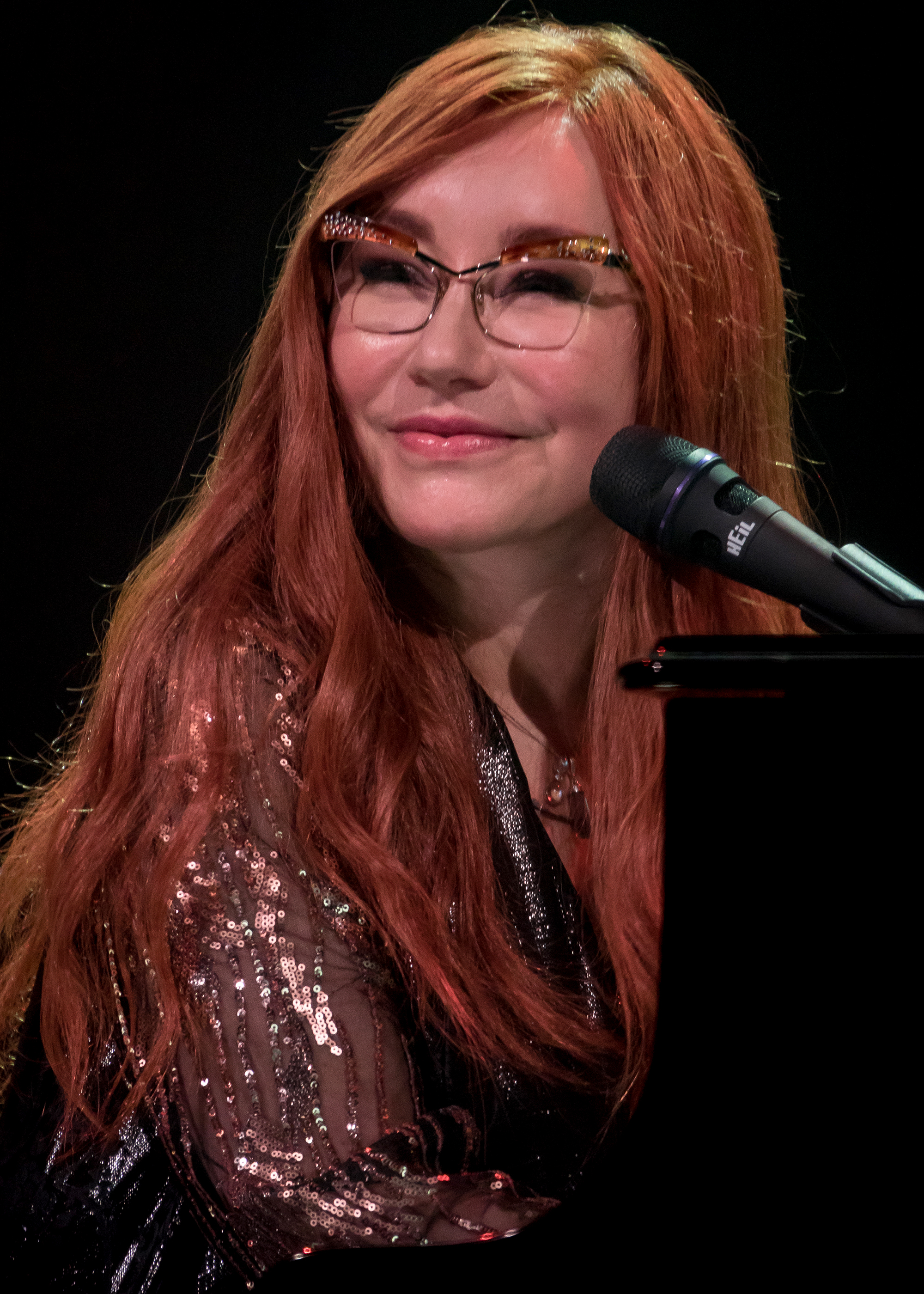
Amos performing live at the Theatre at Ace Hotel in downtown Los Angeles, California, on Friday, December 1, 2017

American singer-songwriter and pianist Tori Amos has recorded songs for eighteen studio albums (including one album as part of Y Kant Tori Read) and a number of soundtracks and compilation releases. Amos also released numerous B-sides and out-takes from her studio albums throughout her career.

Amos has included many cover versions in her live concerts throughout her career. The following list only includes covers for which she recorded studio versions or where a live recording has had an official release on a live album or single.

== Songs ==
Title	Year	Album or single	Notes	Ref(s).
"'97 Bonnie & Clyde"	2001	Strange Little Girls	Cover of song by Eminem.	
"16 Shades of Blue"	2014	Unrepentant Geraldines	–	
"23 Peaks"	2026	In Times of Dragons	–	
"29 Years"	2021	Ocean to Ocean	–	
"500 Miles"	2009	Abnormally Attracted to Sin	–	
"1000 Oceans"	1999	To Venus and Back	–	
"A Case of You"	1994	"Cornflake Girl"	Cover of song by Joni Mitchell. Later included on Under the Pink Australian tour edition (1994).	
"A Nightingale Sang in Berkeley Square"	2019	Good Omens soundtrack	–	
"A Silent Night with You"	2009	Midwinter Graces	–	
"A Sorta Fairytale"	2002	Scarlet's Walk	–	
"Abnormally Attracted to Sin"	2009	Abnormally Attracted to Sin	–	
"Addition of Light Divided"	2021	Ocean to Ocean	–	
"After All"	2001	"Strange Little Girl"	Cover of song by David Bowie. Later included on the 2026 deluxe edition of Strange Little Girls.	
"Agent Orange"	1996	Boys for Pele	–	
"Alamo"	1996	"Talula"	Later included on Boys for Pele deluxe edition (2016).	
"All the Girls Hate Her"	1994	"Cornflake Girl" (U.K.) "God" (U.S.)	Instrumental. Later included on Under the Pink deluxe edition (2015).	
"All Through the Night"	2005	Royce Hall Auditorium, Los Angeles, CA 4/25/05	Live cover of song by Cyndi Lauper. No studio version has been released.	
"Almost Rosey"	2007	American Doll Posse	–	
"Amazing Grace / 'til the Chicken"	1996	"Talula"	"'til the Chicken" is a parody of "Past the Mission". Later included on Boys for Pele deluxe edition (2016).	
"Amber Waves"	2002	Scarlet's Walk	–	
"America"	2014	Unrepentant Geraldines	–	
"Anna's Bakery"	2025	The Music of Tori and the Muses	–	
"Angelshark"	2026	In Times of Dragons	–	
"Angels"	2003	Tales of a Librarian	–	
"Angie"	1992	"Winter" (U.K.) "Crucify" (U.S.)	Cover of song by The Rolling Stones.	
"Another Girl's Paradise"	2002	Scarlet's Walk	–	
"Apollo's Frock"	2002	Scarlet's Hidden Treasures	–	
"Bachelorette"	1998	"Spark"	Later included on A Piano: The Collection (2006).	
"Baker Baker"	1994	Under the Pink	–	
"Baltimore" (as Ellen Amos)	1980	"Baltimore"	–	
"Bang"	2017	Native Invader	–	
"Barons of Suburbia"	2005	The Beekeeper	–	
"Bats"	2017	Native Invader	–	
"Battle of Trees"	2011	Night of Hunters	Based on Gnossienne no. 1 by Erik Satie.	
"Beauty of Speed"	2007	American Doll Posse	–	
"Beauty Queen"	1996	Boys for Pele	Joined with "Horses" as the opening track of the album.	
"Bells for Her"	1994	Under the Pink	–	
"Benjamin"	2017	Native Invader	–	
"Better Angels"	2020	Christmastide	–	
"Beulah Land"	1998	"Jackie's Strength"	Later included on A Piano: The Collection (2006).	
"Big Wheel"	2007	American Doll Posse	–	
"Birthday Baby"	2021	Ocean to Ocean	–	
"Black is the New Black"	2026	In Times of Dragons (HMV exclusive edition)	–	
"Bliss"	1999	To Venus and Back	–	
"Black-Dove (January)"	1998	From the Choirgirl Hotel	–	
"Black Swan"	1994	"Pretty Good Year" (U.K.) "Past the Mission" (U.S.)	Later included on Under the Pink Australian tour edition (1994), A Piano: The Collection (2006) and Under the Pink deluxe edition (2015).	
"Blood Roses"	1996	Boys for Pele	–	
"Blue Lotus"	2026	In Times of Dragons	–	
"Blue Skies" (BT featuring Tori Amos)	1996	Ima (U.S. version)	–	
"Body and Soul"	2007	American Doll Posse	–	
"Bouncing off Clouds"	2007	American Doll Posse	–	
"Breakaway"	2017	Native Invader	–	
"Broken Arrow"	2017	Native Invader	–	
"Building a Mountain"	2025	The Music of Tori and the Muses	–	
"Bug a Martini"	2002	Scarlet's Hidden Treasures	–	
"Butterfly"	1995	Higher Learning soundtrack	–	
"Cactus Practice" (featuring Natashya Hawley)	2011	Night of Hunters	Based on Nocturnes, Op. 9 by Frédéric Chopin.	
"Candle: Coventry Carol"	2009	Midwinter Graces	–	
"Carbon"	2002	Scarlet's Walk	–	
"Carnival"	2000	Music From And Inspired By M:I-2	–	
"Carry"	2011	Night of Hunters	Based on The Girl with the Flaxen Hair from Préludes 1 by Claude Debussy.	
"Cars and Guitars"	2005	The Beekeeper	–	
"Caught a Lite Sneeze"	1996	Boys for Pele	–	
"China"	1992	Little Earthquakes	–	
"Chocolate Song"	2017	Native Invader	–	
"Christmastide"	2020	Christmastide	–	
"Circle Game"	2005	Auditorium Theatre, Chicago, IL 4/15/05	Live cover of song by Joni Mitchell. No studio version has been released.	
"Circle of Seasons"	2020	Christmastide	–	
"Climb"	2017	Native Invader	–	
"Cloud On My Tongue"	1994	Under the Pink	A re-recorded version appears on Gold Dust (2012).	
"Cloud Riders"	2017	Native Invader	–	
"Code Red"	2007	American Doll Posse	–	
"Comfort and Joy" (Deluxe edition)	2009	Midwinter Graces	Based on the Christmas carol "God Rest You Merry, Gentlemen".	
"Concertina"	1999	To Venus and Back	–	
"Cool on Your Island"	1988	Y Kant Tori Read	–	
"Cooling"	1998	"Spark"	Later included on A Piano: The Collection (1998).	
"Cornflake Girl"	1994	Under the Pink	–	
"Crazy"	2002	Scarlet's Walk	–	
"Crucify"	1992	Little Earthquakes	–	
"Cruel"	1998	From the Choirgirl Hotel	–	
"Curtain Call"	2009	Abnormally Attracted to Sin	–	
"Daisy Dead Petals"	1994	"Pretty Good Year" (U.K.) "Cornflake Girl" (U.S.)	Later included on Under the Pink Australian tour edition (1994), A Piano: The Collection (2006) and Under the Pink deluxe edition (2015).	
"Dark Side of the Sun"	2007	American Doll Posse	–	
"Dātura"	1999	To Venus and Back	–	
"Day and Night (from the Faerie Workshop)"	2025	The Music of Tori and the Muses	–	
"Devil's Bane"	2021	Ocean to Ocean	–	
"Devils and Gods"	2007	American Doll Posse	–	
"Digital Ghost"	2007	American Doll Posse	–	
"Dixie"	2014	Unrepentant Geraldines (Amazon MP3 edition)	Later included on the 10th anniversary edition of Unrepentant Geraldines released in 2024.	
"Do It Again"	1998	"Spark"	Cover of song by Steely Dan.	
"Dolphin Song"	2006	A Piano: The Collection	Out-take from Scarlet's Walk.	
"Don't Look Back in Anger"	2005	Manchester Apollo, Manchester, UK 6/5/05	Live cover of song by Oasis. No studio version has been released.	
"Don't Make Me Come to Vegas"	2002	Scarlet's Walk	–	
"Doughnut Song"	1996	Boys for Pele	–	
"Dragon"	2007	American Doll Posse	–	
"Drive All Night"	2007	"Big Wheel"	Later included as a digital download bonus track with copies of American Doll Posse purchased through Borders.	
"Down by the Seaside" (with Robert Plant)	1995	Encomium (A Tribute To Led Zeppelin)	Cover of song by Led Zeppelin.	
"Edge of the Moon"	2011	Night of Hunters	Based on Siciliana from Flute Sonata, BWV 1031 by Johann Sebastian Bach.	
"Emmanuel"	2009	Midwinter Graces	Based on Christmas carol "O Come, O Come, Emmanuel".	
"Enjoy the Silence"	2001	Strange Little Girls	Cover of song by Depeche Mode.	
"Etienne Trilogy" ("The Highlands" / "Etienne" / "Skyeboat Song")	1988	Y Kant Tori Read	–	
"Famous Blue Raincoat"	1995	Tower Of Song (The Songs Of Leonard Cohen)	Cover of song by Leonard Cohen. A live version was a b-side to "Glory of the 80's" and "Concertina".	
"Fanny Faudrey"	2026	In Times of Dragons	–	
"Fast Horse"	2009	Abnormally Attracted to Sin	–	
"Fat Slut"	2007	American Doll Posse	–	
"Father Figure"	2005	Hammersmith Apollo, London, UK 6/4/05	Live cover of song by George Michael. No studio version has been released.	
"Father Lucifer"	1996	Boys for Pele	–	
"Father's Son"	2007	American Doll Posse	–	
"Fayth"	1988	Y Kant Tori Read	–	
"Fearlessness"	2011	Night of Hunters	Based on Orientale from 12 Spanish Dances by Enrique Granados.	
"Finn"	1997	Great Expectations (The Album)	Instrumental.	
"Fire on the Side"	1988	Y Kant Tori Read	–	
"Fire-Eater's Wife"	2006	A Piano: The Collection	Out-take from Boys for Pele, released in demo form with "Beauty Queen". Later included on Boys for Pele deluxe edition (2016).	
"Fire to Your Plain"	2009	Abnormally Attracted to Sin	–	
"Floating City"	1988	Y Kant Tori Read	–	
"Flavor"	2009	Abnormally Attracted to Sin	A re-recorded version appears on Gold Dust (2012).	
"Flicker"	2016	–	Used in the documentary Audrie & Daisy (2016).	
"Flood"	2026	In Times of Dragons	–	
"Flowers Burn to Gold"	2021	Ocean to Ocean	–	
"Flying Dutchman"	1992	"China"	Later included on Under the Pink Australian tour edition (1994), A Piano: The Collection (2006), Little Earthquakes deluxe edition (2015) and Little Earthquakes – The B-Sides (2023). A re-recorded version appears on Gold Dust (2012).	
"Frog on My Toe"	1996	"Talula"	Later included on Boys for Pele deluxe edition (2016).	
"Forest of Glass"	2014	Unrepentant Geraldines (Deluxe edition)	Later included on the 10th anniversary edition of Unrepentant Geraldines released in 2024.	
"Garlands"	2005	The Beekeeper (Deluxe edition)	Only appears on the bonus DVD with the deluxe version of The Beekeeper.	
"Gasoline Girls"	2026	In Times of Dragons	–	
"General Joy"	2005	The Beekeeper	–	
"Giant's Rolling Pin"	2014	Unrepentant Geraldines	–	
"Girl"	1992	Little Earthquakes	–	
"Girl Disappearing"	2007	American Doll Posse	Later re-recorded for Gold Dust (2012).	
"Give"	2009	Abnormally Attracted to Sin	–	
"Glory of the 80's"	1999	To Venus and Back	–	
"God"	1994	Under the Pink	–	
"Gold Dust"	2002	Scarlet's Walk	A re-recorded version appears on Gold Dust (2012).	
"Good King Wenceslas"	2009	Midwinter Graces (iTunes edition)	–	
"Goodbye Pisces"	2005	The Beekeeper	–	
"Graveyard"	1996	"Caught a Lite Sneeze"	Later included on Boys for Pele deluxe edition (2016).	
"Growing Up"	2026	Strange Little Girls	Cover of song by Bruce Springsteen. First released on the 2026 expanded edition.	
"Happiness is a Warm Gun"	2001	Strange Little Girls	Cover of song by The Beatles.	
"Happy Phantom"	1992	Little Earthquakes	–	
"Harps of Gold"	2009	Midwinter Graces	Based on the Christmas carol "Angels We Have Heard on High".	
"Have Yourself a Merry Little Christmas"	1998	"Spark"	–	
"Heart Attack at 23"	1988	Y Kant Tori Read	–	
"Heart of Gold"	2001	Strange Little Girls	Cover of song by Neil Young.	
"Here. in My Head"	1992	"Crucify"	Later included on Under the Pink Australian tour edition (1994), A Piano: The Collection (2006) and Little Earthquakes deluxe edition (2015).	
"Hey Jupiter"	1996	Boys for Pele	–	
"Holly"	2020	Christmastide	–	
"Holly, Ivy, and Rose"	2009	Midwinter Graces	Based on the Christmas carols "The Holly and the Ivy" and "Es ist ein Ros entsprungen".	
"Home on the Range"	1994	"God" (U.S.) "Pretty Good Year" (U.K.)	Traditional American West folk song. Tori's version is usually subtitled "Cherokee version" or "with Cherokee addition". Later included on A Piano: The Collection (2006) and Under the Pink deluxe edition (2015).	
"Honey"	1994	"Pretty Good Year" (U.K.) "Cornflake Girl" (U.S.)	Later included on Under the Pink Australian tour edition (1994), A Piano: The Collection (2006) and Under the Pink deluxe edition (2015).	
"Hoochie Woman"	2005	The Beekeeper	–	
"Hoover Factory"	2026	Strange Little Girls	Cover of song by Elvis Costello. First released on 2026 expanded edition.	
"Horses"	1996	Boys for Pele	Joined with "Beauty Queen" as the opening track of the album.	
"Hotel"	1998	From the Choirgirl Hotel	–	
"How Glass Is Made"	2021	Ocean to Ocean	–	
"Humpty Dumpty"	1992	"China"	Later included on Little Earthquakes deluxe edition (2015) and Little Earthquakes – The B-Sides (2023).	
"Hungarian Wedding Song"	1996	"Caught a Lite Sneeze" (U.K.)	Later included on Boys for Pele deluxe edition (2016).	
"I Can't See New York"	2002	Scarlet's Walk	–	
"I Don't Like Mondays"	2001	Strange Little Girls	Cover of song by The Boomtown Rats.	
"i i e e e"	1998	From the Choirgirl Hotel	–	
"I Ran"	2005	Paramount Theatre, Denver, CO 4/19/05	Live cover of song by A Flock of Seagulls. No studio version has been released.	
"I'm Not in Love"	2001	Strange Little Girls	Cover of song by 10cc.	
"I'm on Fire"	1996	VH1 Crossroads	Cover of song by Bruce Springsteen.	
"Icicle"	1994	Under the Pink	–	
"If 6 Was 9"	1994	"Cornflake Girl" (U.K.)	Cover of song by Jimi Hendrix.	
"In the Springtime of His Voodoo"	1996	Boys for Pele	–	
"In Times of Dragons"	2026	In Times of Dragons	–	
"Indian Summer"	2002	Scarlet's Hidden Treasures	–	
"Insect Ballet"	2025	The Music of Tori and the Muses	–	
"Ireland"	2005	The Beekeeper	–	
"Invisible Boy"	2014	Unrepentant Geraldines	–	
"It's a Happy Day" (as Ellin Amos)	1978	"It's a Happy Day"/"Baltimore"	–	
"Jackie's Strength"	1998	From the Choirgirl Hotel	A re-recorded version appears on Gold Dust (2012).	
"Jamaica Inn"	2005	The Beekeeper	–	
"Jeanette, Isabella"	2009	Midwinter Graces	Based on the Christmas carol "Bring a Torch, Jeanette, Isabella".	
"Job's Coffin" (featuring Natashya Hawley)	2011	Night of Hunters	–	
"Josephine"	1999	To Venus and Back	–	
"Juárez"	1999	To Venus and Back	–	
"Knocking"	2025	The Music of Tori and the Muses	–	
"Lady in Blue"	2009	Abnormally Attracted to Sin	–	
"Landslide"	1997	Y100 Sonic Sessions Volume One	Cover of song by Fleetwood Mac.	
"Leather"	1992	Little Earthquakes	–	
"Let's Do It Again" (Andy Gray vs. Tori Amos)	2000	"Let's Do It Again" (12" Promo)	Promo-only dance mix.	
"Like a Prayer"	2005	Hammersmith Apollo, London, UK 6/4/05	Live cover of song by Madonna. No studio version has been released.	
"Liquid Diamonds"	1998	From the Choirgirl Hotel	–	
"Little Amsterdam"	1996	Boys for Pele	–	
"Little Drummer Boy"	1992	We've Got Your Yule Logs Hangin' (Kevin and Bean compilation)	Later included on Under the Pink Australian tour edition (1994).	
"Little Earthquakes"	1992	Little Earthquakes	–	
"Livin' on a Prayer"	2005	Royce Hall Auditorium, Los Angeles, CA 4/25/05	Live cover of song by Bon Jovi. No studio version has been released.	
"London Girls"	1996	"Caught a Lite Sneeze" (U.K.) "Talula" (U.S.)	Cover of song by Chas & Dave. Later included on Boys for Pele deluxe edition (2016).	
"Losing My Religion"	1995	Higher Learning soundtrack	Cover of song by R.E.M.	
"Lust"	1999	To Venus and Back	–	
"Maids of Elfen-Mere"	2014	Unrepentant Geraldines	–	
"Marianne"	1996	Boys for Pele	A re-recorded version appears on Gold Dust (2012).	
"Martha's Foolish Ginger"	2005	The Beekeeper	–	
"Mary"	1992	"Crucify"	Later included on A Piano: The Collection (2006), Little Earthquakes deluxe edition (2015) and Little Earthquakes – The B-Sides (2023). A re-recorded version appears on Tales of a Librarian (2003).	
"Mary Jane"	2009	Abnormally Attracted to Sin	–	
"Mary's Eyes"	2017	Native Invader	–	
"Marys of the Sea"	2005	The Beekeeper	An extended version appears on A Piano: The Collection (2006).	
"Maybe California"	2009	Abnormally Attracted to Sin	A re-recorded version appears on iTunes and Japanese editions of Gold Dust (2012).	
"Me and a Gun"	1991	Little Earthquakes	First released on the Me and a Gun EP (1991).	
"Mermaid Muse Speaks"	2025	The Music of Tori and the Muses	–	
"Merman"	1998	–	First released as a pre-order bonus download track with copies of From the Choirgirl Hotel purchased online from Tower Records. Later included on No Boundaries: A Benefit for the Kosovar Refugees (1999) and A Piano: The Collection (2006).	
"Metal Water Wood"	2021	Ocean to Ocean	–	
"Miracle"	2007	American Doll Posse (iTunes pre-order)	Only released as a limited-time download for those who purchased American Doll Posse through iTunes.	
"Mother"	1992	Little Earthquakes	–	
"Mother Revolution"	2005	The Beekeeper	–	
"Mountain"	2002	–	Originally only available for online streaming via Scarlet's Web in 2002. Later released on the 2023 reissue of Scarlet's Hidden Treasures.	
"Mr. Bad Man"	2007	American Doll Posse	–	
"Mr. Zebra"	1996	Boys for Pele	–	
"Mrs. Jesus"	2002	Scarlet's Walk	–	
"Muhammad My Friend"	1996	Boys for Pele	–	
"Murder He Says"	2003	Mona Lisa Smile soundtrack	–	
"My Favourite Things"	2005	Manchester Apollo, Manchester, UK 6/5/05	Live cover of song from The Sound of Music. No studio version has been released.	
"My Posse Can Do"	2007	American Doll Posse (Deluxe edition)	Only included on the bonus DVD of the American Doll Posse deluxe edition.	
"Nautical Twilight"	2011	Night of Hunters	Based on Venetian Boat Song from Songs Without Words, Op.30 by Felix Mendelssohn.	
"Never Seen Blue"	1998	"Jackie's Strength"	Later included on A Piano: The Collection (2006).	
"New Age"	2001	Strange Little Girls	Cover of song by The Velvet Underground.	
"Night of Hunters" (featuring Kelsey Dobyns)	2011	Night of Hunters	Based on Sonata in F minor, K. 466, Salve Regina by Domenico Scarlatti.	
"Northern Lad"	1998	From the Choirgirl Hotel	–	
"Not David Bowie"	2006	A Piano: The Collection	Out-take from The Beekeeper.	
"Not Dying Today"	2009	Abnormally Attracted to Sin	–	
"Not the Red Baron"	1996	Boys for Pele	–	
"Ocean to Ocean"	2021	Ocean to Ocean	–	
"Ode to Minnesota"	2026	In Times of Dragons	–	
"Ode to My Clothes"	2006	A Piano: The Collection	Recorded in 2001.	
"Ode to the Banana King"	1992	"Silent All These Years"	Later included on Little Earthquakes deluxe edition (2015) and Little Earthquakes – The B-Sides (2023).	
"On the Boundary"	1988	Y Kant Tori Read	–	
"Only Women Bleed"	2001	"Strange Little Girl"	Cover of song by Alice Cooper. Later included on the 2026 deluxe edition of Strange Little Girls.	
"Operator"	2005	Auditorium Theatre, Chicago, IL 4/15/05	Live cover of song by Jim Croce. No studio version has been released.	
"Operation Peter Pan"	2002	"A Sorta Fairytale"	Later included on Scarlet's Hidden Treasures (2023 digital edition).	
"Ophelia"	2009	Abnormally Attracted to Sin	–	
"Original Sinsuality"	2005	The Beekeeper	–	
"Oscar's Theme"	2009	Abnormally Attracted to Sin (iTunes, U.K. and Australian editions)	–	
"Our New Year"	2009	Midwinter Graces	–	
"Over It"	1994	"Cornflake Girl" (U.K.) "God" (U.S.)	Instrumental. Later included on Under the Pink deluxe edition (2015).	
"Oysters"	2014	Unrepentant Geraldines	–	
"Pancake"	2002	Scarlet's Walk	–	
"Pandora's Aquarium"	1998	From the Choirgirl Hotel	–	
"Paradiso Perduto" (Patrick Doyle featuring Tori Amos)	1997	Great Expectations (The Score)	–	
"Parasol"	2005	The Beekeeper	–	
"Past the Mission"	1994	Under the Pink	–	
"Peeping Tommi"	2006	A Piano: The Collection	Out-take from Under the Pink.	
"Pink and Glitter"	2009	Midwinter Graces	–	
"Pirates"	1988	Y Kant Tori Read	–	
"Playboy Mommy"	1998	From the Choirgirl Hotel	–	
"Police Me"	2009	Abnormally Attracted to Sin	–	
"Posse Bonus"	2007	American Doll Posse	–	
"Precious Things"	1992	Little Earthquakes	A re-recorded version appears on Gold Dust (2012).	
"Pretty Good Year"	1994	Under the Pink	–	
"Professional Widow"	1996	Boys for Pele	–	
"Programmable Soda"	2007	American Doll Posse	Later re-recorded for Gold Dust (2012).	
"Promise" (with Natashya Hawley)	2014	Unrepentant Geraldines	–	
"Provincetown"	2026	In Times of Dragons	–	
"Purple People"	1998	"Spark"	Later included on From the Choirgirl Hotel Japanese edition (1998). Mistitled "Purple People (Christmas in Space)" on UK, Australian and Canadian copies of the "Spark" single.	
"Putting the Damage On"	1996	Boys for Pele	–	
"Pyrite"	2026	In Times of Dragons	–	
"Rain Brings Change"	2025	The Music of Tori and the Muses	–	
"Raining Blood"	2001	Strange Little Girls	Cover of song by Slayer.	
"Raspberry Swirl"	1998	From the Choirgirl Hotel	–	
"Rattlesnakes"	2001	Strange Little Girls	Cover of song by Lloyd Cole and the Commotions.	
"Real Man"	2001	Strange Little Girls	Cover of song by Joe Jackson.	
"Reindeer King"	2017	Native Invader	–	
"Ribbons Undone"	2005	The Beekeeper	–	
"Ring My Bell"	1992	Ruby Trax (The NME's Roaring Forty)	Cover of song by Anita Ward.	
"Riot Poof"	1999	To Venus and Back	–	
"Roosterspur Bridge"	2007	American Doll Posse	–	
"Rose Dover"	2014	Unrepentant Geraldines	–	
"Ruby Through the Looking-Glass"	2002	Scarlet's Hidden Treasures	–	
"Russia"	2017	Native Invader (Deluxe edition)	–	
"S'Magic Day"	2025	The Music of Tori and the Muses	–	
"Samurai"	1996	"Caught a Lite Sneeze" (U.K.) "Talula" (U.S.)	–	
"Sarah Sylvia Stout Would Not Take the Garbage Out"	1992	Speaking of Christmas	Poem by Shel Silverstein.	
"Scarlet's Walk"	2002	Scarlet's Walk	–	
"Seaside"	2002	Scarlet's Hidden Treasures	–	
"Secret Spell"	2007	American Doll Posse	–	
"Selkie"	2014	Unrepentant Geraldines	–	
"Seven Sisters"	2011	Night of Hunters	Instrumental.	
"Shattering Sea"	2011	Night of Hunters	Based on Song of the Madwoman on the Sea-Shore, Prelude Op. 31, No. 8 by Charles-Valentin Alkan.	
"She's Your Cocaine"	1998	From the Choirgirl Hotel	–	
"She's Leaving Home" (Miloš Karadaglić featuring Tori Amos)	2016	Blackbird: The Beatles Album	–	
"Shush"	2026	In Times of Dragons	–	
"Silent All These Years"	1991	Little Earthquakes	First released on the Me and a Gun EP in 1991. A re-recorded version appears on Gold Dust (2012)	
"Siren"	1997	Great Expectations (The Album)	–	
"Sister Janet"	1994	"Cornflake Girl" (U.K. and U.S.) "God" (U.S.)	Later included on Under the Pink Australian tour edition (1994), A Piano: The Collection (2006) and Under the Pink deluxe edition (2015).	
"Sister Named Desire"	1996	"Talula"	Later included on Boys for Pele deluxe edition (2016).	
"Sleeps with Butterflies"	2005	The Beekeeper	–	
"Smells Like Teen Spirit"	1992	"Winter" (U.K.) "Crucify" (U.S.)	Cover of song by Nirvana. Later included on Little Earthquakes deluxe edition (2015).	
"Smokey Joe"	2007	American Doll Posse	–	
"Snow Angel"	2009	Midwinter Graces	A re-recorded version appears on the Japanese edition of Gold Dust (2012).	
"Snow Blind" (featuring Natashya Hawley)	2011	Night of Hunters	Based on Añoranza from 6 Pieces on Spanish Folksongs by Enrique Granados.	
"Snow Cherries from France"	2003	Tales of a Librarian	A re-recorded version appears on Gold Dust (2012).	
"Somewhere Over the Rainbow"	1996	"Hey Jupiter"	Live version on Hey Jupiter EP. No studio version has been released.	
"Song for Eric"	1992	"Silent All These Years"	Later included on Little Earthquakes deluxe edition (2015) and Little Earthquakes – The B-Sides (2023).	
"Song of Sorrow"	2026	In Times of Dragons	–	
"Space Dog"	1994	Under the Pink	–	
"Spark"	1998	From the Choirgirl Hotel	–	
"Speaking with Trees"	2021	Ocean to Ocean	–	
"Spies"	2021	Ocean to Ocean	–	
"Spike's Lament"	2025	The Music of Tori and the Muses	–	
"Spring Haze"	1999	To Venus and Back	–	
"St. Teresa"	2026	In Times of Dragons	–	
"Star of Wonder"	2009	Midwinter Graces	Based on "We Three Kings". A re-recorded version appears on Gold Dust (2012).	
"Star Whisperer"	2011	Night of Hunters	Based on Andantino from Piano Sonata in A major, D 959 by Franz Schubert.	
"Starling"	2009	Abnormally Attracted to Sin	–	
"Stille Nacht, heilige Nacht (Silent Night, Holy Night)" (Deluxe edition)	2009	Midwinter Graces	–	
"Strange"	2002	Scarlet's Walk	–	
"Strange Fruit"	1994	"Cornflake Girl" (U.K.)	Cover of song by Billie Holiday.	
"Strange Little Girl"	2001	Strange Little Girls	Cover of song by The Stranglers	
"Strawberry Moon"	2026	In Times of Dragons	–	
"Strong Black Vine"	2009	Abnormally Attracted to Sin	–	
"Stronger Together"	2026	In Times of Dragons	–	
"Sucker"	2016	Boys for Pele (2016 deluxe edition)	–	
"Suede"	1999	To Venus and Back	–	
"Sugar"	1992	"China"	Later included on Under the Pink Australian tour edition (1994), A Piano: The Collection (2006), Little Earthquakes deluxe edition (2015) and Little Earthquakes – The B-Sides (2023).	
"Suzanne"	2005	Paramount Theatre, Denver, CO 4/19/05	Live cover of song by Leonard Cohen. No studio version has been released.	
"Sweet Dreams"	1992	"Winter"	Later included on A Piano: The Collection (2006), Little Earthquakes deluxe edition (2015) and Little Earthquakes – The B-Sides (2023). A re-recorded version appears on Tales of a Librarian (2003).	
"Sweet Sangria"	2002	Scarlet's Walk	–	
"Sweet the Sting"	2005	The Beekeeper	–	
"Swim to New York State"	2021	Ocean to Ocean	–	
"Swimming Pools (Drank)" (Trevor Horn featuring Tori Amos)	2023	Echoes: Ancient & Modern	–	
"Take Me with You"	2006	A Piano: The Collection	Music originally written in 1990.	
"Take to the Sky"	1992	"Winter"	Also known as "Take to the Sky (Russia)". Later included on Under the Pink Australian tour edition (1994), A Piano: The Collection (2006), Little Earthquakes deluxe edition (2015) and Little Earthquakes – The B-Sides (2023).	
"Talula"	1996	Boys for Pele	–	
"Taxi Ride"	2002	Scarlet's Walk	–	
"Tear in Your Hand"	1992	Little Earthquakes	–	
"Teenage Hustling"	2007	American Doll Posse	–	
"Tempest"	2026	In Times of Dragons	–	
"Thank You"	1992	"Winter" (U.K.) "Crucify" (U.S.)	Cover of song by Led Zeppelin.	
"That Guy"	2009	Abnormally Attracted to Sin	–	
"That's What I Like Mick (The Sandwich Song)"	1996	"Caught a Lite Sneeze"	Cover of song by Chas & Dave. Later included on Boys for Pele deluxe edition (2016).	
"The Beekeeper"	2005	The Beekeeper	–	
"The Big Picture"	1988	Y Kant Tori Read	–	
"The Chase" (featuring Natashya Hawley)	2011	Night of Hunters	Based on The Old Castle from Pictures at an Exhibition by Modest Mussorgsky.	
"The Happy Worker"	1992	Toys soundtrack	–	
"The Pool"	1992	"Winter"	Later included on A Piano: The Collection (2006), Little Earthquakes deluxe edition (2015) and Little Earthquakes – The B-Sides (2023).	
"The Power of Orange Knickers" (featuring Damien Rice)	2005	The Beekeeper	–	
"The Vicar's Wife"	2014	Unrepentant Geraldines	Hidden song joined with "Unrepentant Geraldines".	
"The Waitress"	1994	Under the Pink	–	
"The Wrong Band"	1994	Under the Pink	–	
"This Old Man"	1996	"Caught a Lite Sneeze"	Later included on Boys for Pele deluxe edition (2016).	
"Thoughts"	1991	"Silent All These Years"	First released on the Me and a Gun EP, which was later re-titled to "Silent All These Years". Later included on Little Earthquakes deluxe edition (2015) and Little Earthquakes – The B-Sides (2023).	
"Time"	2001	Strange Little Girls	Cover of song by Tom Waits.	
"To the Fair Motormaids of Japan"	2016	Boys for Pele (2016 deluxe edition)	–	
"Toast"	2005	The Beekeeper	–	
"Tombigbee"	2002	Scarlet's Hidden Treasures	–	
"Toodles Mr. Jim"	1996	"Caught a Lite Sneeze"	Later included on Boys for Pele Japanese edition (1996) and Boys for Pele deluxe edition (2016).	
"Total Eclipse of the Heart"	2005	B of A Pavilion, Boston, MA 8/21/05	Live cover of song by Bonnie Tyler. No studio version has been released.	
"Trouble's Lament"	2014	Unrepentant Geraldines	–	
"Twinkle"	1996	Boys for Pele	–	
"Unrepentant Geraldines"	2014	Unrepentant Geraldines	–	
"Up the Creek" (featuring Natasha Hawley)	2017	Native Invader	–	
"Upside Down"	1991	"Silent All These Years" (U.K.) "Winter" (U.S.)	First released on the Me and a Gun EP, which was later re-titled to "Silent All These Years". Later included on Under the Pink Australian tour edition (1994), A Piano: The Collection (2006), Little Earthquakes deluxe edition (2015) and Little Earthquakes – The B-Sides (2023).	
"Upside Down 2"	2017	Native Invader (Deluxe edition)	–	
"Veins"	2026	In Times of Dragons	–	
"Velvet Revolution"	2007	American Doll Posse	–	
"Virginia"	2002	Scarlet's Walk	–	
"Wait Until Tomorrow" (The Bullitts featuring Tori Amos)	2013	They Die By Dawn & Other Short Stories...	–	
"Walk to Dublin (Sucker Reprise)"	2006	A Piano: The Collection	Out-take from Boys for Pele. Later included on Boys for Pele deluxe edition (2016).	
"Walking With You" (as Ellen Amos)	1980	"Baltimore"	–	
"Wampum Player"	2002	Scarlet's Walk	–	
"Way Down"	1996	Boys for Pele	An extended version appears on Tales of a Librarian (2003).	
"Weatherman"	2014	Unrepentant Geraldines	–	
"Wedding Day"	2014	Unrepentant Geraldines	–	
"Wednesday"	2002	Scarlet's Walk	–	
"Welcome to England"	2009	Abnormally Attracted to Sin	–	
"What Child, Nowell"	2009	Midwinter Graces	"What Child Is This?" and "The First Nowell" are both traditional Christmas Carols.	
"White Telephone to God"	2014	Unrepentant Geraldines (iTunes edition)	Later included on the 10th anniversary edition of Unrepentant Geraldines released in 2024.	
"Whole Lotta Love"	2008	Live at Montreux 1991/1992	Live cover of song by Led Zeppelin. No studio version has been released.	
"Why Don't You Love Me?" (David Byrne and Fatboy Slim featuring Tori Amos and Cyndi Lauper)	2010	Here Lies Love	–	
"Wild Way"	2014	Unrepentant Geraldines	–	
"Wildwood"	2017	Native Invader	–	
"Wings"	2017	Native Invader	–	
"Winter"	1992	Little Earthquakes	A re-recorded version appears on Gold Dust (2012).	
"Winter's Carol"	2009	Midwinter Graces	–	
"Witness"	2005	The Beekeeper	–	
"Yes, Anastasia"	1994	Under the Pink	A re-recorded version appears on Gold Dust (2012).	
"Yo George"	2007	American Doll Posse	–	
"You Belong to Me"	2003	Mona Lisa Smile soundtrack	–	
"You Can Bring Your Dog"	2007	American Doll Posse	–	
"You Go to My Head"	1988	Y Kant Tori Read	–	
"You'll Be Taken Care Of" (David Byrne and Fatboy Slim featuring Tori Amos)	2010	Here Lies Love	–	
"Your Cloud"	2002	Scarlet's Walk	–	
"Your Ghost"	2011	Night of Hunters	Based on Theme and Variations in E-flat major, WoO 24 from Ghost Variations by Robert Schumann.	
"Zero Point"	2006	A Piano: The Collection	Out-take from To Venus and Back.	

== See also ==
- Tori Amos discography
