= Gold Dust Orchestral Tour =

2012 concert tour by Tori Amos

- Tour by Tori Amos
- Associated album: Gold Dust
- Start date: October 1, 2012
- End date: October 15, 2012
- No. of shows: 5 in Europe; 2 in North America; 7 in total

Tori Amos concert chronology
- Night of Hunters Tour (2011); Gold Dust Orchestral Tour (2012); Unrepentant Geraldines Tour (2014)

The Gold Dust Orchestral Tour was a concert tour by American singer-songwriter Tori Amos in support of her compilation album Gold Dust. She was supported by the Metropole Orchestra in Europe, and by a String Octet from the Juilliard School in North America. Both North America dates were professionally recorded, with the New York City concert being streamed live by NPR Music and the Norfolk concert becoming part of the Infinity Hall Live TV series

== Songs ==
Songs performed with the Metropole Orchestra
- Baker Baker
- Cloud on my Tongue
- Edge of the Moon
- Flavor
- Flying Dutchman
- Girl Disappearing
- Gold Dust
- Hey Jupiter
- Jackie's Strength
- Leather
- Marianne
- Our New Year
- Precious Things
- Programmable Soda
- Silent All These Years
- Snow Cherries from France
- Star of Wonder
- Winter
- Yes, Anastasia
Songs performed with the String Octet
- Cloud on my Tongue
- Flavor
- Hey Jupiter
- Jackie's Strength
- Leather
- Smokey Joe
- Snow Cherries from France
- Winter
Additional songs performed solo on piano and/or keyboard
- 1000 Oceans
- Here in My Head
- Jamaica Inn
- Marianne
- Merman
- Mr. Zebra
- Purple People
- Putting the Damage On
- Ribbons Undone
- So Long, Farewell
- Taxi Ride
- Upside Down

== Tour dates ==
| Date | City | Country | Venue |
|---|---|---|---|
Europe
| October 1, 2012 | Rotterdam | Netherlands | De Doelen |
| October 2, 2012 | Brussels | Belgium | Bozar |
| October 3, 2012 | London | United Kingdom | Royal Albert Hall |
North America
| October 5, 2012 | New York City | United States | (Le) Poisson Rouge |
| October 8, 2012 | Norfolk | United States | Infinity Hall |
Europe
| October 13, 2012 | Warsaw | Poland | Sala Kongresowa |
| October 15, 2012 | Berlin | Germany | Berliner Philharmonie |
