= Diving Deep Live =

Live album by Tori Amos
- Released: December 6, 2024
- Recorded: 2022–2023
- Length: 121:25 (CD and digital); 89:12 (LP)
- Label: Decca

Tori Amos chronology
Little Earthquakes – The B-Sides (2023)	Diving Deep Live (2024)	The Music of Tori and the Muses (2025)

Singles from Diving Deep Live
- 1. "Cornflake Girl" Released: November 1, 2024

Diving Deep Live is the sixth live album by American singer-songwriter and pianist Tori Amos. It was released on December 6, 2024, through Decca Records. The album was recorded on Amos' Ocean to Ocean Tour throughout 2022 and 2023 backed by bassist and "musical director" Jon Evans and drummer Ash Soan. The standard LP contains twelve tracks, while CD and digital releases, under the name Diving Deeper, feature four bonus tracks, which were subsequently released on vinyl for Record Store Day. "Cornflake Girl" was released as the album's single on November 1, 2024.

== Track listing ==
All tracks are written by Tori Amos.

Diving Deep Live track listing
No.	Title	Length
1.	"God"	5:01
2.	"Ocean To Ocean"	9:28
3.	"Amber Waves"	5:07
4.	"Daisy Dead Petals"	3:50
5.	"Pandora's Aquarium"	7:47
6.	"Silent All These Years"	6:24
7.	"Ruby Through The Looking-Glass"	8:04
8.	"Climb"	8:39
9.	"Spring Haze"	11:58
10.	"Code Red"	6:27
11.	"Cornflake Girl"	6:44
12.	"Lady In Blue"	9:37
Total length:		89:12

Diving Deeper bonus tracks
No.	Title	Length
13.	"Here. In My Head"	8:41
14.	"Crazy"	9:21
15.	"Sister Janet"	6:46
16.	"Mother Revolution"	7:25
Total length:		121:25

== Personnel ==
- Tori Amos – Bösendorfer piano, keyboards, vocals
- Jon Evans – bass, pedals, musical director
- Ash Soan – drums, percussion, loops

Technical personnel

- Mark Hawley – engineering, mixing
- Adam Spry – assistant engineering
- Adrian Hall – mixing
- Jon Astley – mastering
- Miles Showell – vinyl mastering
- Mike Lafferty - production and stage manager
- Miles Barton – PA system design (Front Of House engineering assistant)
- Aaron Havill – MIDI engineering
- Andy Yates - monitor and stage audio technician
- Neil Heal – monitor engineering
- Keith Andersen – tour management
- Kavita Kaul – photography, styling
- Karen Binns - wardrobe

== Charts ==
Chart performance for Diving Deep Live
Chart (2024)	Peak position
Belgian Albums (Ultratop Flanders)	180
Croatian International Albums (HDU)	27
Scottish Albums (Official Charts)	51
Swiss Albums (Schweizer Hitparade)	83
UK Album Downloads (Official Charts)	33
UK Album Sales (OCC)	41
US Top Album Sales (Billboard)	35
