= Little Earthquakes – The B-Sides =

Compilation album by Tori Amos
- Released: April 22, 2023
- Genre: Alternative rock
- Length: 42:19
- Label: Atlantic
- Producers: Ian Stanley; Davitt Sigerson

Tori Amos chronology
Ocean to Ocean (2021)	Little Earthquakes – The B-Sides (2023)	Diving Deep Live (2024)

Little Earthquakes – The B-Sides is a compilation album by American singer-songwriter and pianist Tori Amos. Originally included as a bonus picture disc as part of Little Earthquakes – The Graphic Album, it received a standalone release on vinyl on April 22, 2023, for Record Store Day through Atlantic Records. The album collects B-sides from the singles taken from Amos' debut studio album Little Earthquakes (1992), and was limited to 10,000 copies. The songs were produced by Ian Stanley and Davitt Sigerson, both of whom also contributed to Little Earthquakes.

Some songs released as B-sides were not included. "Here. In My Head" does not appear on the album, nor do Amos's covers of "Smells Like Teen Spirit", "Angie", and "Thank You" (all of which appeared on the "Crucify" single).

== Reception ==
Little Earthquakes – The B-Sides reached number 173 on the Billboard 200. It also peaked at number 24 on the Top Alternative Albums chart.

Consequence called it one of the "30 Must-Have Releases" of Record Store Day 2023. The Current included the album on their list of "25 Special Releases" highlighted for the event.

Variety included the album on their Most Wanted Exclusives list, highlighting tracks such as "Sugar" and "Mary" and stating, "it's hard to think of many classic albums that had a better set of B-sides than [Little Earthquakes]".

== Track listing ==
All tracks are written by Tori Amos, except "Humpty Dumpty" (based on the nursery rhyme).

Side one
No.	Title	Producer	Length
1.	"Upside Down" (from "Silent All These Years", 1991)	Davitt Sigerson	4:22
2.	"Thoughts" (from "Silent All These Years", 1991)	–	2:36
3.	"Song for Eric" (from "Silent All These Years", 1992)	Ian Stanley	1:50
4.	"The Pool" (from "Winter", 1992)	Stanley	2:51
5.	"Humpty Dumpty" (from "China", 1992)	Stanley	2:50
6.	"Flying Dutchman" (from "China", 1992)	Sigerson	6:31
Total length:			21:00

Side two
No.	Title	Producer	Length
1.	"Take to the Sky" (from "Winter", 1992)	Sigerson	4:20
2.	"Sweet Dreams" (from "Winter", 1992)	Sigerson	3:26
3.	"Mary" (from "Crucify", 1992)	Sigerson	4:27
4.	"Sugar" (from "China", 1992)	Stanley	5:00
5.	"Ode to the Banana King (Part One)" (from "Silent All These Years", 1992)	Stanley	4:06
Total length:			21:19

== Charts ==
Chart performance for Little Earthquakes – The B-Sides
Chart (2023)	Peak position
Hungarian Albums (MAHASZ)	29
Scottish Albums (Official Charts)	40
UK Vinyl Albums	35
US Billboard 200	173
US Top Alternative Albums (Billboard)	24
US Top Album Sales (Billboard)	16
