= Native Invader =

Studio album by Tori Amos
- Released: September 8, 2017
- Recorded: 2016–2017
- Studios: Martian Engineering Studios, Cornwall, UK
- Length: 61:57
- Label: Decca
- Producer: Tori Amos

Tori Amos chronology
Unrepentant Geraldines (2014)	Native Invader (2017)	Christmastide (2020)

Singles from Native Invader
- 1. "Cloud Riders" Released: July 28, 2017; 2. "Up the Creek" Released: August 11, 2017; 3. "Reindeer King" Released: August 25, 2017

Professional ratings
Aggregate scores
Source	Rating
Metacritic	76/100
Review scores
Source	Rating
AllMusic	4/5 stars
Pitchfork	7.5/10

Native Invader is the fifteenth studio album (twelfth of entirely original material) by American singer-songwriter and pianist Tori Amos. It was released on September 8, 2017, through Decca Records. Its lead single "Cloud Riders", was released on July 27, 2017.

== Background ==
Amos contributed the song "Flicker" for Netflix documentary film Audrie & Daisy's ending credits. In a Billboard interview, Amos was asked about future plans, revealing there will be "another album next year. We're in beginning stages and it might be a very different record beginning Nov. 9, but let's see where we're going."

On April 18, Amos began a five-day countdown with a series of Instagram posts depicting a studio and a "sacred fire". On the fifth day, the news was revealed to be a brand new album and world tour.

== Inspiration ==
In her fan newsletter, it states in Summer 2016, Amos took a road trip through North Carolina's Smoky Mountains with intention to reconnect with the stories of her mother's family. That winter, her mother suffered a stroke. With that and the 2016 United States election, the album took a different direction. Amos states, "It wasn't going to be a record of pain, blood and bone when I began. It wasn't going to be a record of division ... I listened and watched the conflicts that were traumatizing the nation and [wrote] about those raw emotions."

Regarding writing the songs, Amos has said that "[T]here's an intake and an outtake period. That's when I'm finding works. So there was a deluge for Native Invader after quite a while of waiting for the muses to come. And then once things aligned and there was enough pressure [from] what was going on in the world and what happened to Mary, then all of a sudden, it's kismet and it all lined up. Now, it doesn't always work like that where it comes as a rush where I'm working on 7 songs at a time but that's what started to happen and you start filing really quickly and go 'Oh, you're not a part of this structure are you. Oh, no you are! You’re a "Reindeer King"! You're three different songs at once!'"

While the album incorporates Native American themes, Tori Amos stated that she is an "observer" of Native American culture who is "not in a position to speak for First Nations people– that’s a sacred task."

== Critical reception ==
Native Invader was well-received from music critics upon release. The album received a score of 76 out of 100 on the review aggregator website Metacritic, based on 14 reviews, indicating "generally favorable reviews".

Reviewing the album for AllMusic, Neil Z. Yeung wrote, "Native Invader stands tall with its own vital voice and energy, alluding to beloved touchstones from throughout Amos' oeuvre while remaining fully of its time."

Pitchfork rated the album positively, claiming that "[Amos'] intricately arranged songs are passionate and despairingly poetic."

== Native Invader Tour ==
To promote the album, Amos embarked on the Native Invader Tour across Europe and North America. The tour began on September 6, 2017, in Cork, Ireland and concluded on December 3 in Los Angeles, California.

Regarding Amos duetting live with her daughter Tash, "I don't think on this tour but [...] in the not so long future. [...] It is one of those things again that kind of has to be something we work up and rehearse."

== Track listing ==
Native Invader track listing
No.	Title	Length
1.	"Reindeer King"	7:06
2.	"Wings"	4:09
3.	"Broken Arrow"	5:20
4.	"Cloud Riders"	5:23
5.	"Up the Creek" (featuring Tash)	3:22
6.	"Breakaway"	4:36
7.	"Wildwood"	4:41
8.	"Chocolate Song"	4:41
9.	"Bang"	6:11
10.	"Climb"	4:02
11.	"Bats"	4:18
12.	"Benjamin"	2:43
13.	"Mary's Eyes"	5:16
Total length:		61:57

Deluxe edition bonus tracks
No.	Title	Length
14.	"Upside Down 2"	3:23
15.	"Russia"	2:44
Total length:		68:07

== Personnel ==
- Tori Amos – Bösendorfer piano, Hammond organ, keyboards, vocals, programming, additional instrumentation
- Mac Aladdin – guitar
- John Philip Shenale – synth programming, additional keyboards (tracks 1 and 13)
- Mark Hawley – programming, additional instrumentation
- Tash – vocals (track 5)

== Charts ==
Chart (2017)	Peak position
Australian Albums (ARIA)	113
Austrian Albums (Ö3 Austria)	21
Belgian Albums (Ultratop Flanders)	19
Belgian Albums (Ultratop Wallonia)	46
Dutch Albums (Album Top 100)	20
French Albums (SNEP)	128
German Albums (Offizielle Top 100)	18
Irish Albums (IRMA)	20
Italian Albums (FIMI)	50
New Zealand Heatseekers Albums (RMNZ)	5
Polish Albums (ZPAV)	19
Scottish Albums (Official Charts)	15
Spanish Albums (PROMUSICAE)	87
Swiss Albums (Schweizer Hitparade)	23
UK Albums (Official Charts)	16
US Billboard 200	39
US Top Alternative Albums (Billboard)	3
US Top Rock Albums (Billboard)	6
