= Tori Amos =

American singer-songwriter (born 1963)

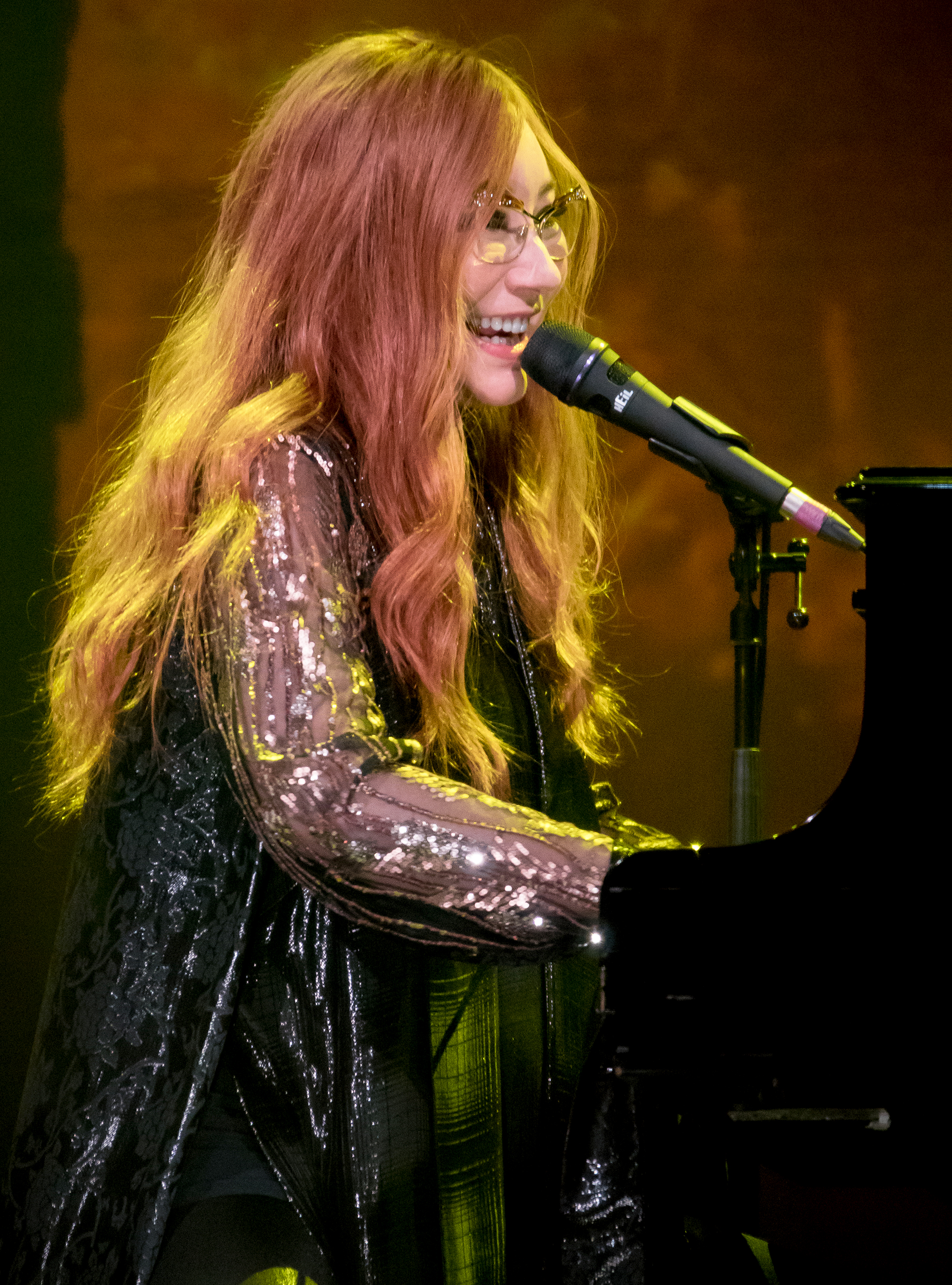
- Amos performing in 2017

Background information
- Also known as: Ellen Amos; Tess Makes Good
- Born: Myra Ellen Amos; August 22, 1963 (age 63); Newton, North Carolina, U.S.
- Genres: Alternative rock; chamber pop; pop rock; electronic
- Occupations: Singer-songwriter; musician; pianist
- Instruments: Vocals; piano; keyboards
- Works: Discography; songs
- Years active: 1979–present
- Labels: Atlantic; Epic; Republic; Deutsche Grammophon; Mercury Classics; Decca; Fontana
- Formerly of: Y Kant Tori Read
- Website: toriamos.com

Signature
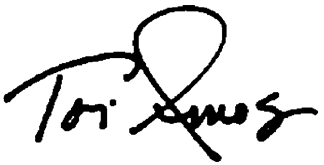

Tori Amos (born Myra Ellen Amos; August 22, 1963) is an American singer-songwriter and pianist. She is a classically trained musician with a mezzo-soprano vocal range. A child prodigy, Amos entered the Peabody Institute's preparatory division at five, but left at eleven, coming of age as a pianist in Washington, D.C. bars. Amos was the lead singer of the short-lived 1980s pop-rock group Y Kant Tori Read before achieving her breakthrough as a solo artist in the early 1990s. Her songs focus on a broad range of topics, including sexuality, feminism, politics, and religion.

Her charting singles include "Crucify", "Silent All These Years", "God", "Cornflake Girl", "Caught a Lite Sneeze", "Professional Widow", "Spark", "1000 Oceans", "Flavor" and "A Sorta Fairytale". Amos has received five MTV VMA nominations and nine Grammy Award nominations, and won an Echo Klassik award for her Night of Hunters classical crossover album. She is listed on VH1's 1999 "100 Greatest Women of Rock and Roll" at number 71.

== Early life and education ==
Amos was born as Myra Ellen Amos. on August 22, 1963, at Old Catawba Hospital, in Newton, North Carolina during her parents' trip from their home in Georgetown, Washington, D.C. She is the third child of Mary Ellen (née Copeland) and Edison McKinley Amos. Some of Amos's ancestors were Confederate soldiers.

When she was two years old, her family relocated to Baltimore, Maryland, where her father had moved his Methodist ministry from its original base in Washington, D.C. Her older brother and sister took piano lessons, but Tori did not need them. From the time she could reach the piano, she taught herself to play; when she was two, she could reproduce pieces of music she had only heard once, and, by the age of three, she was composing her own songs. She has described seeing music as structures of light since early childhood, an experience consistent with chromesthesia:

The song appears as light filament once I've cracked it. As long as I've been doing this, which is more than thirty-five years, I've never seen the same light creature in my life. Obviously similar chord progressions follow similar light patterns, but try to imagine the best kaleidoscope ever—after the initial excitement, you start to focus on each element's stunning original detail. For instance, the sound of the words with the sound of the chord progression combined with the rhythm manifests itself in a unique expression of the architecture of color-and-light. ... I started visiting this world when I was three, listening to a piece by Béla Bartók; I visited a configuration that day that wasn't on this earth. ... It was euphoric.

At five, she became the youngest student ever admitted to the preparatory division of the Peabody Institute. She studied classical piano at Peabody from 1968 to 1974. In 1974, when she was eleven, her scholarship was discontinued, and she was asked to leave. Amos said that she lost the scholarship because of her interest in rock and popular music, coupled with her dislike for reading from sheet music.

In 1972, the Amos family moved to Silver Spring, Maryland, where her father became pastor of the Good Shepherd United Methodist church. At thirteen, Amos began playing at gay bars and piano bars, chaperoned by her father.

Amos won a county teen talent contest in 1977, singing a song called "More Than Just a Friend". As a senior at Richard Montgomery High School, she co-wrote "Baltimore" with her brother, Mike Amos, for a competition involving the Baltimore Orioles. The song did not win the contest but became her first single, released as a 7-inch single pressed locally for family and friends in 1980 with another Amos-penned composition as a B-side, "Walking With You". Before this, she had performed under her middle name, Ellen, and was considering the stage name "Sammy Jaye" at the time, but permanently adopted "Tori" after a friend's boyfriend told her she looked like a Torrey pine, a tree native to the West Coast.

== Career ==
=== 1979–1989: Career beginnings and Y Kant Tori Read ===
By the time she was 17, Amos had a stock of homemade demo tapes that her father regularly sent out to record companies and producers. Producer Narada Michael Walden responded favorably: he and Amos cut some tracks together, but none were released. Eventually, Atlantic Records responded to one of the tapes, and, when A&R man Jason Flom flew to Baltimore to audition her in person, the label was convinced and signed her.

In 1984, Amos moved to Los Angeles to pursue her music career after several years performing on the piano bar circuit in the Washington, D.C. area.

In 1986, Amos formed a musical group called Y Kant Tori Read, named for her difficulty with sight-reading. In addition to Amos, the group was composed of Steve Caton (who would later play guitars on all of her albums until 1999), drummer Matt Sorum, bass player Brad Cobb and, for a short time, keyboardist Jim Tauber. The band went through several iterations of songwriting and recording; Amos has said interference from record executives caused the band to lose its musical edge and direction during this time. Finally, in July 1988, the band's eponymous debut album, Y Kant Tori Read, was released. Although its producer, Joe Chiccarelli, stated that Amos was very happy with the album at the time, Amos has since criticized it, once remarking: "The only good thing about that album is my ankle high boots."

Following the album's commercial failure and the group's subsequent disbanding, Amos began working with other artists (including Stan Ridgway, Sandra Bernhard, and Al Stewart) as a backup vocalist. She also recorded a song called "Distant Storm" (which she did not write), which was used in the film China O'Brien. In the credits, the song is attributed to a band called Tess Makes Good. Amos recorded the vocals for the song in 1988, for $150; she was unaware for several years that the song had actually been heard in a film. Other than the appearance in the film itself, "Distant Storm" has never been commercially issued in any format.

=== 1990–1995: Little Earthquakes and Under the Pink ===
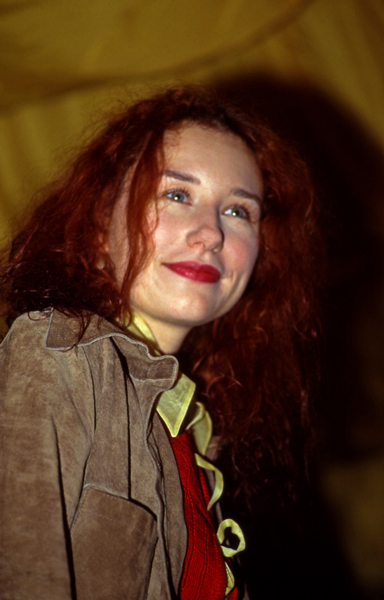
Amos in 1993 Alexandra Palace, London

Despite the disappointing reaction to Y Kant Tori Read, Amos still had to fulfill her six-record contract with Atlantic Records, which, in 1989, wanted a new record by March 1990. The initial recordings were declined by the label, which Amos felt was because the album had not been properly presented. The album was reworked and expanded under the guidance of Doug Morris and the musical talents of Steve Caton, Eric Rosse, Will MacGregor, Carlo Nuccio, and Dan Nebenzal, resulting in Little Earthquakes, an album recounting her religious upbringing, sexual awakening, struggle to establish her identity, and sexual assault. This album became her commercial and artistic breakthrough, entering the British charts in January 1992 at Number 15. Little Earthquakes was released in the United States in February 1992 and slowly but steadily began to attract listeners, gaining more attention with the video for the single "Silent All These Years".

Amos traveled to New Mexico with personal and professional partner Eric Rosse in 1993 to write and largely record her second solo record, Under the Pink. The album was received with mostly favorable reviews and sold enough copies to chart at No. 12 on the Billboard 200, a significantly higher position than the preceding album's position at No. 54 on the same chart. However, the album found its biggest success in the UK, debuting at number one upon release in February 1994.

=== 1996–2000: Boys for Pele, From the Choirgirl Hotel, and To Venus and Back ===
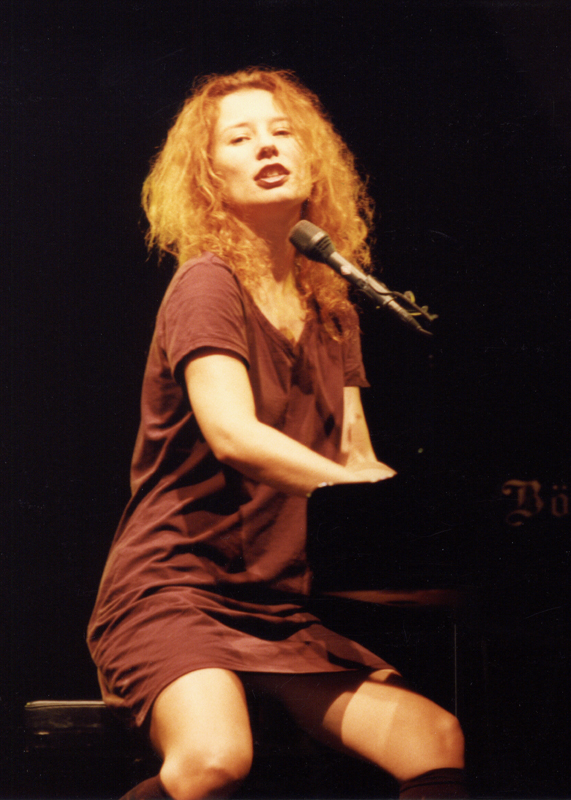
Amos in 1996

Her third solo album, Boys for Pele, was released in January 1996. Prior to its release, the first single, "Caught a Lite Sneeze" became the first full song released for streaming online prior to an album's release.

The album was recorded in a church in Delgany, County Wicklow, Ireland, with Amos taking advantage of the church's acoustics. For this album, Amos used the harpsichord, harmonium, and clavichord as well as the piano. The album garnered mixed reviews upon its release, with some critics praising its intensity and uniqueness while others bemoaned its comparative impenetrability. Despite the album's varied lyrical content and instrumentation, the latter of which kept it away from mainstream audiences, Boys for Pele is Amos's most successful simultaneous transatlantic release, reaching No. 2 on the UK Top 40 and No. 2 on the Billboard 200 upon its release.

Fueled by the desire to have her own recording studio to distance herself from record company executives, Amos had the barn of her home in Cornwall, UK converted into the state-of-the-art recording studio of Martian Engineering Studios.

From the Choirgirl Hotel and To Venus and Back, released in May 1998 and September 1999, respectively, differ greatly from previous albums. Amos's trademark acoustic, piano-based sound is largely replaced with arrangements that include elements of electronica and dance music with vocal washes. The underlying themes of both albums deal with womanhood and Amos's own miscarriages and marriage. Reviews for From the Choirgirl Hotel were mostly favorable and praised Amos's continued artistic originality. Debut sales for From the Choirgirl Hotel were Amos's best to date, selling 153,000 copies in its first week. To Venus and Back, a two-disc release of original studio material and live material recorded from the previous world tour, received mostly positive reviews and included the first major-label single available for sale as a digital download.

=== 2001–2004: Strange Little Girls and Scarlet's Walk ===
Shortly after giving birth to her daughter, Amos decided to record a cover album, taking songs written by men about women and reversing the gender roles to reflect a woman's perspective. That became Strange Little Girls, released in September 2001. The album is Amos's first concept album, with artwork featuring Amos photographed in character of the women portrayed in each song. Amos would later reveal that a stimulus for the album was to end her contract with Atlantic without giving them original songs; Amos felt that since 1998, the label had not been properly promoting her and had trapped her by refusing to sell her contract to another label.

With her Atlantic contract fulfilled after a 15-year stint, Amos signed to Epic in late 2001. In October 2002, Amos released Scarlet's Walk, another concept album. Described as a "sonic novel", the album explores Amos's alter ego, Scarlet, intertwined with her cross-country concert tour following 9/11. Through the songs, Amos explores such topics as the history of America, American people, Native American history, pornography, masochism, homophobia and misogyny. The album had a strong debut at No. 7 on the Billboard 200. Scarlet's Walk is Amos's last album to date to reach certified gold status from the RIAA.

Not long after Amos was ensconced with her new label, she received unsettling news when Polly Anthony resigned as president of Epic Records in 2003. Anthony had been one of the primary reasons Amos signed with the label and as a result of her resignation, Amos formed the Bridge Entertainment Group. Further trouble for Amos occurred the following year when her label, Epic/Sony Music Entertainment, merged with BMG Entertainment as a result of the industry's decline.

=== 2005–2008: The Beekeeper and American Doll Posse ===
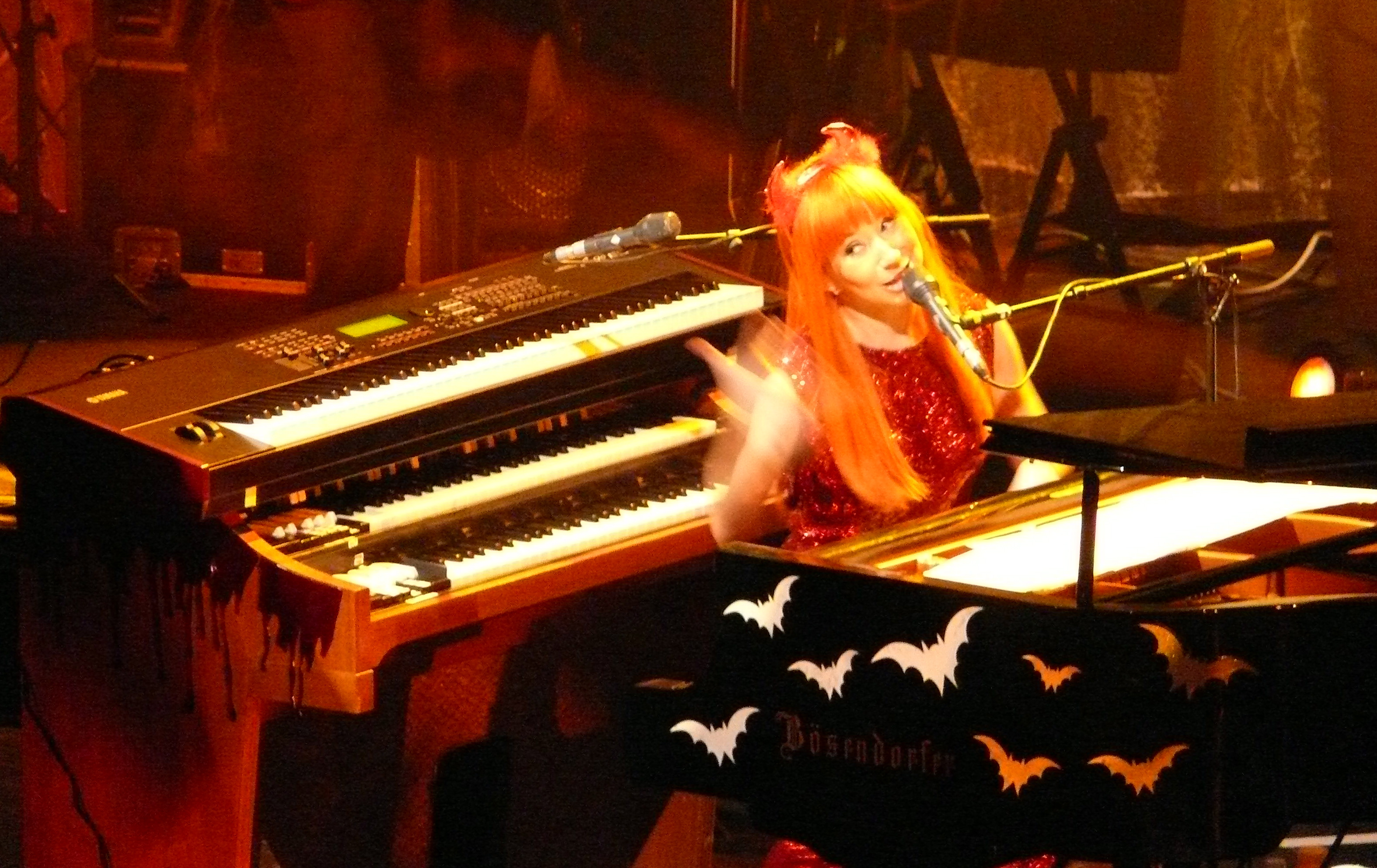
Amos in concert in 2007

Amos released two more albums with Epic, The Beekeeper (2005) and American Doll Posse (2007). Both albums received generally favorable reviews. The Beekeeper was conceptually influenced by the ancient art of beekeeping, which she considered a source of female inspiration and empowerment. Through extensive study, Amos also wove in the stories of the Gnostic gospels and the removal of women from a position of power within the Christian church to create an album based largely on religion and politics. The album debuted at No. 5 on the Billboard 200, placing her in an elite group of women who have secured five or more US Top 10 album debuts. While the newly merged label was present throughout the production process of The Beekeeper, Amos and her crew nearly completed her next project, American Doll Posse, before inviting the label to listen to it. American Doll Posse, another concept album, is fashioned around a group of girls (the "posse") who are used as a theme of alter-egos of Amos's. Musically and stylistically, the album saw Amos return to a more confrontational nature. Like its predecessor, American Doll Posse debuted at No. 5 on the Billboard 200.

During her tenure with Epic Records, Amos also released a retrospective collection titled Tales of a Librarian (2003) through her former label, Atlantic Records; a two-disc DVD set Fade to Red (2006) containing most of Amos's solo music videos, released through the Warner Bros. reissue imprint Rhino; a five disc box set titled A Piano: The Collection (2006), celebrating Amos's 15-year solo career through remastered album tracks, remixes, alternate mixes, demos, and a string of unreleased songs from album recording sessions, also released through Rhino; and numerous official bootlegs from two world tours, The Original Bootlegs (2005) and Legs & Boots (2007) through Epic Records.

=== 2008–2011: Abnormally Attracted to Sin and Midwinter Graces ===
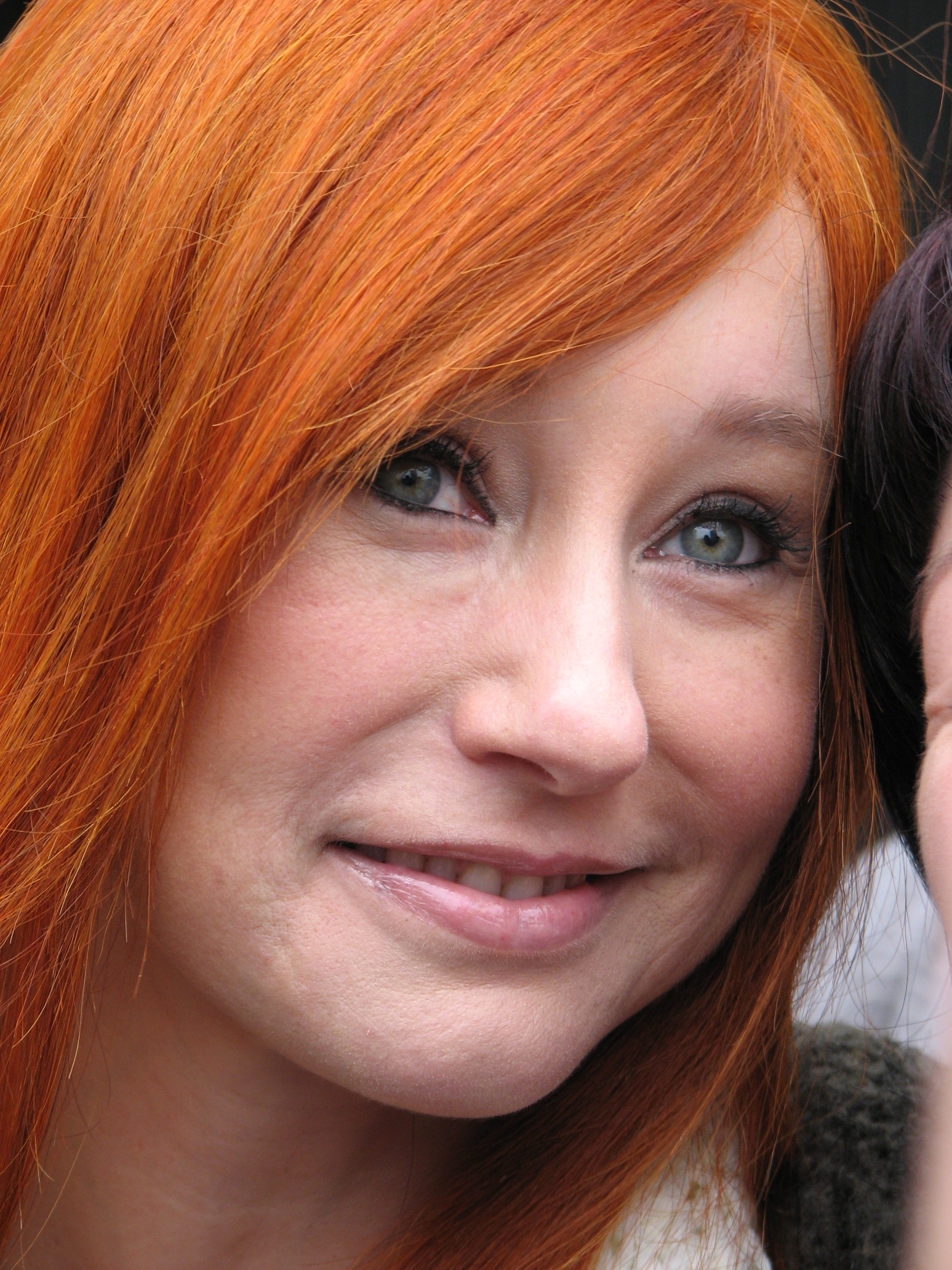
Amos in 2010

In May 2008, Amos announced that, due to creative and financial disagreements with Epic Records, she had negotiated an end to her contract with the record label, and would be operating independently of major record labels on future work. In September of the same year, Amos released a live album and DVD, Live at Montreux 1991/1992, through Eagle Rock Entertainment, of two performances she gave at the Montreux Jazz Festival very early on in her career while promoting her debut solo album, Little Earthquakes. By December, after a chance encounter with chairman and CEO of Universal Music Group, Doug Morris, Amos signed a "joint venture" deal with Universal Republic Records.

Abnormally Attracted to Sin, Amos's tenth solo studio album and her first album released through Universal Republic, was released in May 2009 to mostly positive reviews. The album debuted in the top 10 of the Billboard 200, making it Amos's seventh album to do so. Abnormally Attracted to Sin, admitted Amos, is a "personal album", not a conceptual one, with the album exploring themes of power, boundaries, and the subjective view of sin. Continuing her distribution deal with Universal Republic, Amos released Midwinter Graces, her first seasonal album, in November of the same year. The album features reworked versions of traditional carols, as well as original songs written by Amos.

During her contract with the label, Amos recorded vocals for two songs for David Byrne's collaboration album with Fatboy Slim, titled Here Lies Love, which was released in April 2010. In July of the same year, the DVD Tori Amos – Live from the Artists Den was released exclusively through Barnes & Noble.

After a brief tour from June to September 2010, Amos released a live album From Russia With Love in December the same year, recorded in Moscow on September 3, 2010. The limited edition set included a signature edition Lomography Diana F+ camera, along with two lenses, a roll of film and one of five photographs taken of Amos during her time in Moscow. The set was released exclusively through her website and only 2000 copies were produced.

=== 2011–2015: Night of Hunters, Gold Dust, and Unrepentant Geraldines ===
In September 2011, Amos released her first classical-style music album, Night of Hunters, featuring variations on a theme to pay tribute to composers such as Bach, Chopin, Debussy, Granados, Satie and Schubert, on the Deutsche Grammophon label, a division of Universal Music Group. Amos recorded the album with several musicians, including the Apollon Musagète string quartet.

To mark the 20th anniversary of her debut album, Little Earthquakes (1992), Amos released an album of songs from her back catalogue re-worked and re-recorded with the Metropole Orchestra. The album, titled Gold Dust, was released in October 2012 through Deutsche Grammophon.

On May 1, 2012, Amos announced the formation of her own record label, Transmission Galactic, which she said she intended to use to develop new artists.

In 2013, Amos collaborated with the Bullitts on the track "Wait Until Tomorrow" from their debut album, They Die by Dawn & Other Short Stories. She also stated in an interview that a new album and tour would materialize in 2014 and that it would be a "return to contemporary music".

September 2013 saw the launch of Amos's musical project adaptation of George MacDonald's The Light Princess, along with book writer Samuel Adamson and Marianne Elliott. It premiered at London's Royal National Theatre and ended in February 2014. The Light Princess and its lead actress, Rosalie Craig, were nominated for Best Musical and Best Musical Performance respectively at the Evening Standard Award. Craig won the Best Musical Performance category.

Amos's 14th studio album, Unrepentant Geraldines, was released on May 13, 2014, via Mercury Classics/Universal Music Classics in the US. Its first single, "Trouble's Lament", was released on March 28. The album was supported by the Unrepentant Geraldines Tour which began May 5, 2014, in Cork and continued across Europe, Africa, North America, and Australia, ending in Brisbane on November 21, 2014. In Sydney, Amos performed two orchestral concerts, reminiscent of the Gold Dust Orchestral Tour, with the Sydney Symphony Orchestra at the Sydney Opera House.

According to a press release, Unrepentant Geraldines was a "return to her core identity as a creator of contemporary songs of exquisite beauty following a series of more classically-inspired and innovative musical projects of the last four years. [It is] both one further step in the artistic evolution of one of the most successful and influential artists of her generation, and a return to the inspiring and personal music that Amos is known for all around the world."

The 2-CD set The Light Princess (Original Cast Recording) was released on October 9, 2015, via Universal/Mercury Classics. Apart from the original cast performances, the recording also includes two songs from the musical ("Highness in the Sky" and "Darkest Hour') performed by Amos.

=== 2016–2024: Native Invader, Christmastide and Ocean to Ocean ===
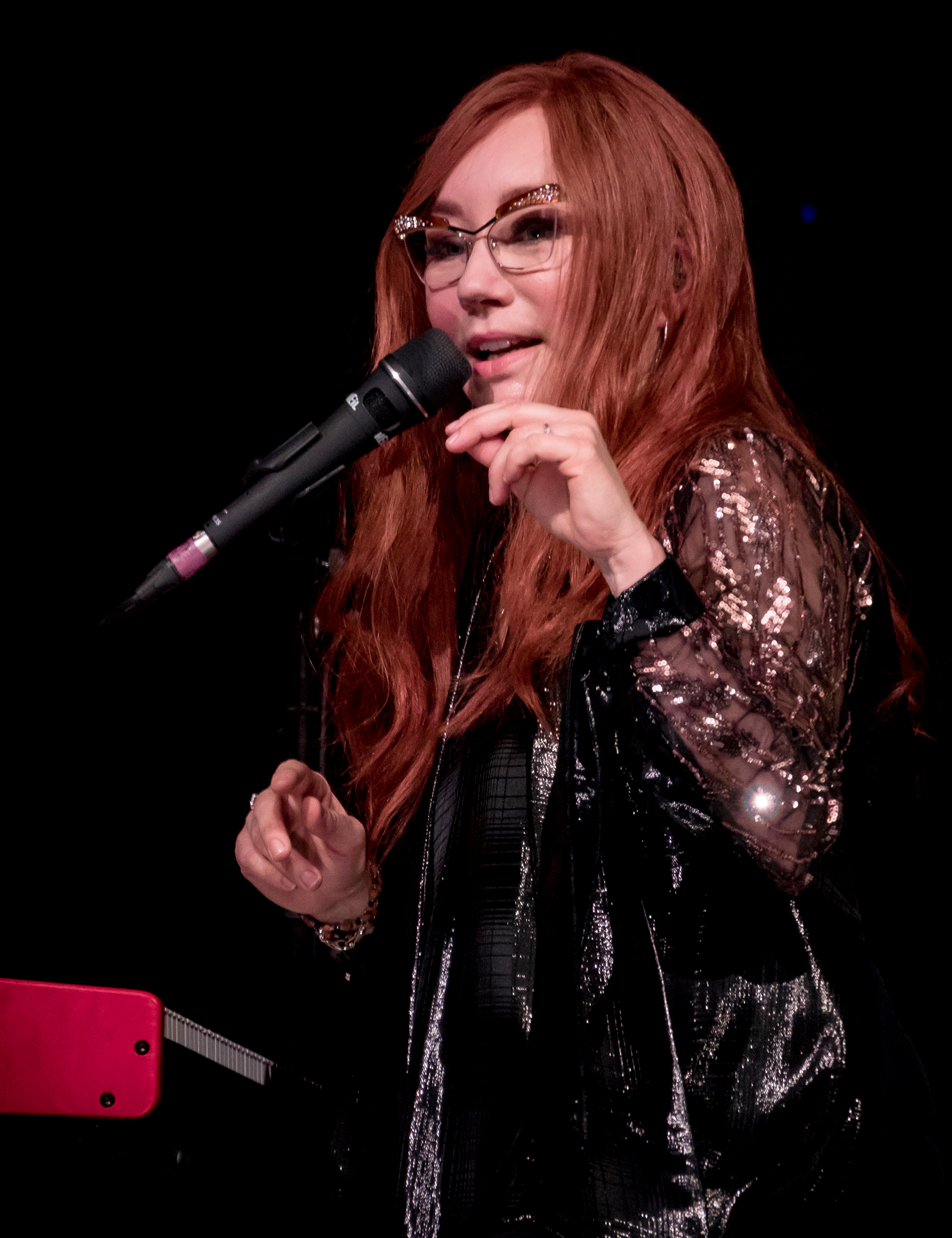
Amos on stage in 2017

On November 18, 2016, Amos released a deluxe version of the album Boys for Pele to commemorate the 20th anniversary of the original release. This follows the deluxe re-releases of her first two albums in 2015.

On September 8, 2017, Amos released Native Invader, accompanied by a world tour. During the summer of 2017, Amos launched three songs from the album: "Cloud Riders", "Up the Creek", and "Reindeer King", the latter featuring string arrangements by John Philip Shenale. Produced by Amos, the album explores topics like American politics and environmental issues, mixed with mythological elements and first-person narrations. Native Invader obtained a score of 76 out of 100 on the review aggregator website Metacritic, based on 17 reviews, indicating "generally favorable reviews".

On November 9, 2020, Amos announced the release of a holiday-themed EP titled Christmastide on December 4, digitally and on limited-edition vinyl. The EP consists of four original songs and features her first work with bandmates Matt Chamberlain and Jon Evans since 2009. Amos recorded the EP remotely due to the impact of the COVID-19 pandemic.

On September 20, 2021, Amos announced her sixteenth studio album, Ocean to Ocean, which was released on October 29. The album was written and recorded in Cornwall during lockdown as a result of the COVID-19 pandemic and explores "a universal story of going to rock bottom and renewing yourself all over again". Amos embarked on a European and United States tour in support of the album in 2022, and continued to support the album in 2023 with a European Tour in March and April and additional US dates in June and July . Matt Chamberlain and Jon Evans were featured on drums and bass guitar respectively, their first collaboration with Amos on an album since 2009's Midwinter Graces. For the 2022 and 2023 tour, Amos was joined by Jon Evans and the drummer Ash Soan.

She appeared at the EPIX original docuseries Women Who Rock which premiered on July 10, 2022.

In 2023, Amos and Trevor Horn covered Kendrick Lamar's "Swimming Pools (Drank)". She also released a remix dance single titled "Tequila," produced by Paul Woolford.

On November 1, 2024, Amos announced the release of a live album, Diving Deep Live, on December 6, 2024, consisting of recordings from her 2022-23 tour in support of Ocean to Ocean. it was released on double vinyl, on CD and digitally.

=== 2025–present: Tori and the Muses and In Times of Dragons ===
On February 28, 2025, Amos released a surprise album, The Music of Tori and the Muses, as a companion project to her illustrated children's book Tori and the Muses, published on March 4, 2025. The album featured nine original songs and featured Jon Evans on bass guitar and Matt Chamberlain on drums. Touring drummer Ash Soan featured on drums on the tracks "Knocking", "Spike's Lament", and "Rain Brings Change".

Amos announced her eighteenth studio album, In Times of Dragons, on October 6, 2025; it was released on CD and vinyl on May 1, 2026. Amos described the album as "a metaphorical story about the fight for Democracy over Tyranny, reflecting the current abhorrent non-accidental burning down of democracy in real time by the 'Dictator believing Lizard Demons' in their usurpation of America".

== In print ==
Amos and her music have been the subject of numerous official and unofficial books, as well as academic critique, including Tori Amos: Lyrics (2001) illustrated by Herb Leonhard, and an earlier biography, Tori Amos: All These Years (1996) by Kalen Rogers.

Released in conjunction with The Beekeeper, Amos co-authored an autobiography with rock music journalist Ann Powers titled Piece by Piece (2005). The book's subject is Amos's interest in mythology and religion, exploring her songwriting process, rise to fame, and her relationship with Atlantic Records. Amos released her second memoir, called Resistance: A Songwriter's Story of Hope, Change, and Courage on May 5, 2020.

Image Comics released Comic Book Tattoo (2008), a collection of comic stories, each based on or inspired by songs recorded by Amos. Editor Rantz Hoseley worked with Amos to gather 80 different artists for the book, including Neil Gaiman, Carla Speed McNeil, Mark Buckingham, C.B. Cebulski, Nikki Cook, Hope Larson, John Ney Reiber, Ryan Kelly, Pia Guerra, David Mack, and Leah Moore.

Tori Amos: In the Studio (2011) by Jake Brown features an in-depth look at Amos's career, discography, and recording process. Sing Us a Song, Piano Woman: Female Fans and the Music of Tori Amos (2013) by Adrienne Trier-Bieniek explores the ways women are represented in pop culture and the many-layered relationships female fans build with feminist musicians in general and with Amos in particular.

Tori Amos: Little Earthquakes (2022), written by Amos and Neil Gaiman, is a graphic novel marking the 30th anniversary of the release of Little Earthquakes. Written by Amos and illustrated by Demelsa Haughton, the children's book Tori and the Muses was released on March 4, 2025.

== Personal life ==
Amos married English sound engineer Mark Hawley on February 22, 1998. They have a daughter.

Amos's mother, Mary Ellen, died on May 11, 2019. Her brother, Edison Michael Amos, died on November 22, 2004.

=== Relationship with Cherokee culture ===
Amos has frequently referred to Native American culture, history, and spirituality in her music and visual art, as well as making personal connections with the culture. She has spoken about ancestors on her mother's side she said were of Cherokee descent.

Of particular importance to her as a child was her maternal grandfather, Calvin Clinton Copeland, whom she has cited as a great source of inspiration and guidance, offering a pantheistic spiritual alternative to her father and paternal grandmother's traditional Christianity. She has said her great-grandmother evaded the Trail of Tears by taking refuge in the Great Smoky Mountains, her family's place of residence. Amos took a trip through the Smokies which formed the creative basis for her album Native Invader. She has taken Ayahuasca and attended sweatlodge ceremonies with her sister.

=== Activism ===
In June 1994, the Rape, Abuse & Incest National Network (RAINN), a toll-free help line in the US connecting callers with their local rape crisis center, was founded. Amos stated in a 1994 interview that she was raped at knife point when she was 22 and did not report the incident to the authorities. She answered the ceremonial first call to launch the hotline. She was the first national spokesperson for the organization and continued to be closely associated with RAINN. On August 18, 2013, a concert in honor of her 50th birthday was held, an event which raised money for RAINN.

On August 22, 2020, Amos appeared on a panel called Artistry & Activism at the diversity and inclusion digital global conference CARLA.

=== Friendship with Neil Gaiman ===
Amos appearing at a 2014 talk by Neil Gaiman

Early in her professional career, Amos befriended author Neil Gaiman, who became a fan after she referred to him in the song "Tear in Your Hand" and also in print interviews. Although created before the two met, the character Delirium from Gaiman's The Sandman series is inspired by Amos. She wrote the foreword to his collection Death: The High Cost of Living; he in turn wrote the introduction to Comic Book Tattoo. Gaiman is godfather to her daughter, and a poem written for her birth, "Blueberry Girl", was published as a children's book of the same name in 2009. In 2019, Amos performed the British standard "A Nightingale Sang in Berkeley Square" over the closing credits of season one of Gaiman's TV series Good Omens, based on the novel of the same name written by Gaiman and Terry Pratchett. Following the revelation of sexual assault allegations against Gaiman in 2024, Amos stated in an interview with The Guardian that she was "shocked", saying that she "never saw that side of Neil" and was not made aware of any misconduct by Gaiman prior to media reporting of the allegations. In 2026, Amos reissued her album Strange Little Girls with all previous contributions from Gaiman removed from the artwork and liner notes.

== Legacy ==
Artists influenced by (and/or admirers of) Amos's work include Alanis Morissette, Amy Lee of Evanescence, Halsey, Brad Walsh, Olly Alexander of Years & Years, Perfume Genius, Anne Hathaway, Willow Smith Justin Timberlake, Olivia Rodrigo, St. Vincent, Leighton Meester, and Jack Colwell.

== Discography ==
Studio albums

- Little Earthquakes (1992)
- Under the Pink (1994)
- Boys for Pele (1996)
- From the Choirgirl Hotel (1998)
- To Venus and Back (1999)
- Strange Little Girls (2001)
- Scarlet's Walk (2002)
- The Beekeeper (2005)
- American Doll Posse (2007)
- Abnormally Attracted to Sin (2009)
- Midwinter Graces (2009)
- Night of Hunters (2011)
- Gold Dust (2012)
- Unrepentant Geraldines (2014)
- Native Invader (2017)
- Ocean to Ocean (2021)
- The Music of Tori and the Muses (2025)
- In Times of Dragons (2026)

== Tours ==
Amos, who has been performing in bars and clubs from as early as 1976 and under her professional name as early as 1991, has performed more than 1,000 shows since her first world tour in 1992. In 2003, Amos was voted fifth best touring act by the readers of Rolling Stone magazine. Her concerts are notable for their changing set lists from night to night.

Little Earthquakes Tour
Amos's first world tour began on January 29, 1992, in London and ended on November 30, 1992, in Auckland. She performed solo with a Yamaha CP-80 unless the venue was able to provide a piano. The tour included 142 concerts around the globe.
Under the Pink Tour
Amos's second world tour began on February 24, 1994, in Newcastle upon Tyne and ended on December 13, 1994, in Perth, Western Australia. Amos performed solo each night on her iconic Bösendorfer piano, and on a prepared piano during "Bells for Her". The tour included 181 concerts.
Dew Drop Inn Tour
The third world tour began on February 23, 1996, in Ipswich, England, and ended on November 11, 1996, in Boulder. Amos performed each night on piano, harpsichord, and harmonium, with Steve Caton on guitar on some songs. The tour included 187 concerts.
Plugged '98 Tour
Amos's first band tour. Amos, on piano and Kurzweil keyboard, was joined by Steve Caton on guitar, Matt Chamberlain on drums, and Jon Evans on bass. The tour began on April 18, 1998, in Fort Lauderdale and ended on December 3, 1998, in East Lansing, Michigan, including 137 concerts. Highlights from the tour were included on the live disc of To Venus and Back.
5 ½ Weeks Tour / To Dallas and Back
Amos's fifth tour was North America–only. The first part of the tour was co-headlining with Alanis Morissette and featured the same band and equipment line-up as in 1998. Amos and the band continued for eight shows before Amos embarked on a series of solo shows. The tour began on August 18, 1999, in Fort Lauderdale, Florida, and ended on December 9, 1999, in Denver, including 46 concerts.
Strange Little Tour
This tour was Amos's first since becoming a mother in 2000 and her first tour fully solo since 1994 (Steve Caton was present on some songs in 1996). It saw Amos perform on piano, Rhodes piano, and Wurlitzer electric piano, and though the tour was in support of her covers album, the set lists were not strictly covers-oriented. Having brought her one-year-old daughter on the road with her, this tour was also one of Amos's shortest ventures, lasting just three months. It began on August 30, 2001, in London and ended on December 17, 2001, in Milan, including 55 concerts.
On Scarlet's Walk / Lottapianos Tour
Amos's seventh tour saw her reunited with Matt Chamberlain and Jon Evans, but not Steve Caton. The first part of the tour, which featured Amos on piano, Kurzweil, Rhodes, and Wurlitzer, was six months long and Amos went out again in the summer of 2003 for a tour with Ben Folds opening. The tour began on November 7, 2002, in Tampa and ended on September 4, 2003, in West Palm Beach, featuring 124 concerts. The final show of the tour was filmed and released as part of a DVD/CD set titled Welcome to Sunny Florida (the set also included a studio EP titled Scarlet's Hidden Treasures, an extension of the Scarlet's Walk album).
Original Sinsuality Tour / Summer of Sin
This tour began on April 1, 2005, in Clearwater, Florida, with Amos on piano, two Hammond B-3 organs, and Rhodes. The tour also encompassed Australia for the first time since 1994. Amos announced at a concert on this tour that she would never stop touring but would scale down the tours. Amos returned to the road in August and September for the Summer of Sin North America leg, ending on September 17, 2005, in Los Angeles. The tour featured "Tori's Piano Bar", where fans could nominate cover songs on Amos's website which she would then choose from to play in a special section of each show. One of the songs chosen was the Kylie Minogue hit "Can't Get You Out of My Head", which Amos dedicated to her the day after Minogue's breast cancer was announced to the public. Other songs performed by Amos include the Doors' "People Are Strange", Depeche Mode's "Personal Jesus", Joni Mitchell's "The Circle Game", Madonna's "Live to Tell" and "Like a Prayer", Björk's "Hyperballad", Led Zeppelin's "When the Levee Breaks" (which she debuted in Austin, Texas, just after the events Hurricane Katrina), Kate Bush's "And Dream of Sheep" and Crowded House's "Don't Dream It's Over", dedicating it to drummer Paul Hester who had died a week before. The entire concert tour featured 82 concerts, and six full-length concerts were released as The Original Bootlegs.
American Doll Posse World Tour
This was Amos's first tour with a full band since her 1999 Five and a Half Weeks Tour, accompanied by long-time bandmates Jon Evans and Matt Chamberlain, with guitarist Dan Phelps rounding out Amos's new band. Amos's equipment included her piano, a Hammond B-3 organ, and two Yamaha S90 ES keyboards. The tour kicked off with its European leg in Rome, Italy, on May 28, 2007, which lasted through July, concluding in Israel; the Australian leg took place during September; the North American leg lasted from October to December 16, 2007, when the tour concluded in Los Angeles. Amos opened each show dressed as one of the four non-Tori personae from the album, then Amos would emerge as herself to perform for the remaining two-thirds of the show. The entire concert tour featured 93 concerts, and 27 full-length concerts of the North American tour were released as official bootlegs in the Legs and Boots series.
Sinful Attraction Tour
For her tenth tour, Amos returned to the trio format of her 2002 and 2003 tours with bassist Jon Evans and drummer Matt Chamberlain while expanding her lineup of keyboards by adding three M-Audio MIDI controllers to her ensemble of her piano, a Hammond B-3 organ, and a Yamaha S90 ES keyboard. The North American and European band tour began on July 10, 2009, in Seattle, Washington, and ended in Warsaw on October 10, 2009. A solo leg through Australia began in Melbourne on November 12, 2009, and ended in Brisbane on November 24, 2009. The entire tour featured 63 concerts. This tour was the last tour to feature Matt Chamberlain on drums to date, as well as the last tour to feature Jon Evans on bass until the Ocean to Ocean Tour in 2022.
Night of Hunters Tour
Amos's eleventh tour was her first with a string quartet, Apollon Musagète, (Amos's equipment includes her piano and a Yamaha S90 ES keyboard) and her first time touring in South Africa. It kicked off on September 28, 2011, in Helsinki Ice Hall, Finland, and ended on December 22, 2011, in Dallas, Texas.
Gold Dust Orchestral Tour
Amos began her 2012 tour in Rotterdam on October 1.
Unrepentant Geraldines Tour
Amos began her 2014 world tour on May 5, 2014, in Cork, Ireland, and concluded it in Brisbane, Australia, on November 21, after playing 73 concerts.
Native Invader Tour
Amos's 2017 tour in support of the Native Invader album kicked off on September 6, 2017, with a series of European shows in Cork, Ireland, moving on to North America in October.
Ocean to Ocean Tour
Amos embarked on tour in 2022 in support of the Ocean to Ocean album, with the bassist John Evans and the drummer Ash Soan. The tour was originally set to begin in Berlin, Germany, but all mainland Europe dates were subsequently postponed due to the ongoing impact of the COVID-19 pandemic. The tour began in the United Kingdom with dates in London, Glasgow and Manchester before moving on to Ireland with dates in Dublin and Cork. The North American tour began in April 2022 in Dallas, Texas, and concluded in June in Los Angeles, California. The 2023 European tour began in Edinburgh, UK, in March 2023. A second American leg followed short after until the end of July. In total, the tour featured 94 shows and is chronicled on Diving Deep Live.

== Awards and nominations ==
Award	Year	Nominee(s)	Category	Result	Ref.
Brit Awards	1993	Herself	International Breakthrough Act	Nominated	
Brit Awards	1993	Herself	International Solo Artist	Nominated	
Brit Awards	1995	Herself	International Female Solo Artist	Nominated	
Cash Box Year-End Awards	1994	Under the Pink	Top Pop Album	Nominated	
Critics' Choice Documentary Awards	2016	"Flicker"	Best Song in a Documentary	Nominated	
ECHO Awards	1995	Herself	Best International Female	Nominated	
ECHO Klassik Awards	2012	Night of Hunters	The Klassik-ohne-Grenzen Prize	Won	
GAFFA Awards	2000	Herself	Best Foreign Female Act	Nominated	
GAFFA Awards	2003	Herself	Best Foreign Female Act	Nominated	
GAFFA Awards	2022	Herself	Best Foreign Solo Act	Nominated	
GAFFA Awards	2022	Ocean to Ocean	Best Foreign Album	Nominated	
George Peabody Medal	2019	Herself	Outstanding Contributions to Music	Won	
Glamour Awards	1998	Herself	Woman of the Year	Won	
Grammy Awards	1995	Under the Pink	Best Alternative Music Album	Nominated	
Grammy Awards	1997	Boys for Pele	Best Alternative Music Album	Nominated	
Grammy Awards	1999	From the Choirgirl Hotel	Best Alternative Music Album	Nominated	
Grammy Awards	1999	"Raspberry Swirl"	Best Female Rock Vocal Performance	Nominated	
Grammy Awards	2000	"Bliss"	Best Female Rock Vocal Performance	Nominated	
Grammy Awards	2000	To Venus and Back	Best Alternative Music Album	Nominated	
Grammy Awards	2002	Strange Little Girls	Best Alternative Music Album	Nominated	
Grammy Awards	2002	"Strange Little Girl"	Best Female Rock Vocal Performance	Nominated	
Grammy Awards	2025	The Music of Tori and the Muses	Best Children's Music Album	Nominated	
Hollywood Music in Media Awards	2016	"Flicker"	Best Original Song in a Documentary	Nominated	
Hungarian Music Awards	2010	Abnormally Attracted to Sin	Best Foreign Alternative Album	Nominated	
MTV Europe Music Awards	1994	Herself	Best Female	Nominated	
MTV Video Music Awards	1992	"Silent All These Years"	Best Female Video	Nominated	
MTV Video Music Awards	1992	"Silent All These Years"	Best New Artist in a Video	Nominated	
MTV Video Music Awards	1992	"Silent All These Years"	Breakthrough Video	Nominated	
MTV Video Music Awards	1992	"Silent All These Years"	Best Cinematography in a Video	Nominated	
MVPA Awards	2000	"1000 Oceans"	Adult Contemporary Video of the Year	Nominated	
MVPA Awards	2002	"Strange Little Girl"	Alternative Video of the Year	Nominated	
MVPA Awards	2002	"Strange Little Girl"	Colorist/Telecine	Nominated	
Music Week Women in Music	2024	Herself	Inspirational Artist	Won	
NME Awards	2016	Under the Pink	Best Reissue	Nominated	
North Carolina Music Hall of Fame	2012	Herself	Inducted	Won	
Pollstar Concert Industry Awards	1993	Little Earthquakes Tour	Best New Rock Artist	Nominated	
Pollstar Concert Industry Awards	1993	Little Earthquakes Tour	Club Tour Of The Year	Nominated	
Pollstar Concert Industry Awards	1995	Under the Pink Tour	Small Hall Tour Of The Year	Nominated	
Pollstar Concert Industry Awards	1997	Dew Drop Inn Tour	Small Hall Tour Of The Year	Nominated	
Pollstar Concert Industry Awards	1999	5 ½ Weeks Tour	Small Hall Tour Of The Year	Nominated	
Q Awards	1992	Herself	Best New Act	Won	
WhatsOnStage Awards	2014	The Light Princess	Best New Musical	Nominated	
WhatsOnStage Awards	2014	The Light Princess	Best London Newcomer of the Year	Nominated	
Žebřík Music Awards	2001	Herself	Best International Female	Nominated	

- 1999: Spin Readers' Poll Awards (Won)

On May 21, 2020, Amos was invited to and gave special remarks at her alma mater Johns Hopkins University's 2020 Commencement ceremony. Other notable guest speakers during the virtual ceremony included Reddit co-founder and commencement speaker Alexis Ohanian; philanthropist and former New York City Mayor Michael Bloomberg; Anthony Fauci, director of the National Institute of Allergy and Infectious Diseases and a leading member of the White House Coronavirus Task Force; and senior class president Pavan Patel.

== Film appearances ==
Amos appears as a wedding singer in the film Mona Lisa Smile. She had previously auditioned for a role as a member of Beverly's band, Cherry Bomb, in the 1986 film Howard the Duck.

Amos performed a cover of R.E.M.'s "Losing My Religion", as well as the original song "Butterfly", for the soundtrack of John Singleton's 1995 film Higher Learning. Her song "Talula" was featured in the epic disaster film Twister (1996). "Professional Widow" was featured in the action film Escape from L.A. (1996). "Siren" was featured in the romantic drama Great Expectations (1998). The songs "'Murder' He Says" and "You Belong To Me" were featured in the films Mona Lisa Smile (2003). "Flicker" was featured in the film Audrie & Daisy (2016).

Numerous songs of hers have been included in television series soundtracks. Some examples include:

- "Crucify" in American adult animated series Beavis and Butt-Head (season 3, episode 31, 1994)
- "God" in American adult animated series Beavis and Butt-Head (season 5, episode 7, 1994)
- "Lust" in fantasy, drama television series Charmed (season 2, episode 12, 1998)
- "Northern Lad" in teen drama television series Dawson's Creek (season 2, episode 4, 1998)
- "A Sorta Fairytale" in drama television series Everwood (season 4, episode 16, 2002)
- "Have Yourself a Merry Little Christmas" in crime procedures comedy-drama television series Bones (season 1, episode 9, 2005) and in science fiction television series Roswell (season 3, episode 9, 1999)
- "Precious Things" in comedy-drama television series Hindsight (season 1, episode 6, 2015)
- "Pretty Good Year" in television series Casual (season 3, episode 12, 2015)
- "A Nightingale Song in Berkeley Square" in fantasy comedy television series Good Omens (season 1, episode 6, 2019)
- "Professional Widow (Armand's Star Trunk Funkin' Mix)" in Netflix drama thriller series White Lines (season 1, episode 9, 2020), in Derry Girls (season 3, episode 4, "The Haunting", 2018) and Love Island (season 5, episode 14, 2015)
- "Crucify" in anthology comedy-drama television series High Maintenance (season 4, episode 8, 2016)
- "Raspberry Swirl" in the television series The End (season 1, episode 9, 2020)
- "1000 Oceans" in mystery teen drama television series Pretty Little Liars (season 1, episode 10, 2022)
- "Cornflake Girl" in Conversations with Friends (season 1, episode 10, 2022), in drama television series YellowJackets (season 2, episode 1, 2023) and in comedy drama series Beef (season 1, episode 2, 2023)
- "Bells for Her" in drama television series Yellowjackets (season 2, episode 3, 2023)
- "Little Earthquakes" in American adult animation series Rick and Morty (season 8, episode 3, 2025)
