= In Times of Dragons =

Studio album by Tori Amos
- Released: May 1, 2026
- Studios: Martian AV (Cornwall); Mezzanotte (Los Angeles)
- Length: 75:56
- Label: Fontana
- Producer: Tori Amos

Tori Amos chronology
The Music of Tori and the Muses (2025)	In Times of Dragons (2026)

Singles from In Times of Dragons
- 1. "Stronger Together" Released: February 24, 2026; 2. "Shush" Released: March 24, 2026; 3. "Gasoline Girls" Released: April 14, 2026

In Times of Dragons is the eighteenth studio album by American singer-songwriter and pianist Tori Amos. It was released on May 1, 2026, through Fontana Records. Amos described the album as a "metaphorical story about the fight for Democracy over Tyranny", using a fictional narrative involving a woman fleeing a wealthy and powerful "Lizard Demon" and ultimately transforming into a half-woman, half-dragon figure.

The album was recorded primarily at Amos's home studio, Martian AV, in Cornwall, with additional work at Mezzanotte in Los Angeles. It incorporates piano, synthesizers, harpsichord, guitars, bass, drums, percussion, electronics and orchestral arrangements. Amos produced the album herself, with Mark Hawley handling recording and mixing alongside Adrian Hall, and John Philip Shenale providing synthesizers, samplers and orchestral arrangements.

The album's narrative draws together political allegory, mythology, autobiography, motherhood and the physical and psychological changes associated with aging. Among its characters are the Lizard Demon, the Daughter, the "Gasoline Girls", a gay witch from Brooklyn, and various mythological figures whom Amos has described as muses, including the Celtic deity Lugh and the Egyptian goddess Sekhmet.

== Background ==
Amos began developing the concept for In Times of Dragons while observing the political upheaval in the United States during 2025. She told Noah Michelson at an April 2026 HMV Q&A that she had initially been watching events unfold while John Philip Shenale was sending her articles about what was happening in America. Rather than write a straightforward political protest album, Amos chose to approach the subject through allegory.

The resulting story follows an alternate version of Amos who is married to a sadistic billionaire "Lizard Demon". The character is an amalgamation of real-world figures and power structures, although Amos has deliberately declined to identify specific individuals. In the opening song, "Shush", the husband attempts to silence the narrator while espousing authoritarian ideas about freedom, democracy and hierarchy. The narrator eventually flees, encounters people from whom she had previously been isolated, reunites with her daughter, and undergoes a transformation into a dragon-like figure.

Amos described the album as a story in which democracy itself is endangered. She explained that the narrator escapes from the Lizard Demon's penthouse and travels into the southern United States, where she encounters a number of characters, including the Daughter. "Stronger Together", which closes the main narrative, depicts the culmination of the relationship between mother and daughter as they choose to stand together against the dangers facing them.

The album's mythology developed alongside its political narrative. Amos has described Lugh of the Long Arm as one of the figures who influenced the record, along with Merlin and the Egyptian goddess Sekhmet. She told The Times that Lugh was communicating with her through journalist Noah Michelson, while Diana Summerland, a medium Amos has consulted since the late 1980s, was associated with her conversations concerning Merlin.

At the April 2026 HMV Q&A, Amos explained that Sekhmet's half-woman, half-lion form provided an archetypal model for the transformation at the heart of the album. She had already written a demo of "Shush" and had established the title track as a "world-builder", but initially did not know exactly how the middle of the narrative would develop.

The album also reflects Amos's changing relationship with her own body and voice. She has described becoming a dragon queen as partly metaphorical for moving through menopause and emerging from it transformed. She also acknowledged that hormonal changes had lowered her vocal range, leading her to adapt rather than attempt to reproduce the higher register associated with her earlier recordings.

== Production ==
In Times of Dragons was produced by Amos, who had by this point produced the majority of her studio albums. Unlike a straightforward return to her earlier work, the album reunited Amos with several longtime collaborators in a particularly collaborative recording process.

At the July 2026 Rough Trade Q&A in New York City, Amos said that she, drummer Matt Chamberlain and bassist Jon Evans had not been together in the same room making music since 2009. Although they had exchanged material remotely during the COVID-19 pandemic, she considered working together in person to be a significant creative difference. She attributed part of the album's character to this renewed collaboration, describing the record as unusually collective and emphasizing the way the musicians pushed one another during the sessions.

The album's sound combines Amos's piano and harpsichord with electric bass, drums, electronics, synthesizers, guitars and orchestral textures. Chamberlain's drums and electronic programming provide much of the album's rhythmic foundation, while Evans supplies bass and Hawley contributes guitars. Shenale's orchestral arrangements and synthesizer work provide a further layer of musical color.

Amos also deliberately adapted her vocal approach to the changes in her voice. In an interview with Mojo, she explained that her vocal range had changed and that she had responded by embracing a smokier register rather than treating the change as something negative.

The album's production was also shaped by the pressure of completing a highly narrative work. Amos told Michelson that Matt Chamberlain was waiting in the studio while she was still trying to complete some of the material. She described the experience as forcing her to work intensely, writing, discarding and rebuilding material rather than becoming overly attached to individual lines or ideas.

=== Theme and lyrical content ===
The central theme of In Times of Dragons is the conflict between democratic ideals and authoritarian power. Amos deliberately places this contemporary political conflict inside a fantastical narrative rather than writing a conventional protest album. The "Lizard Demon" is both a personal abuser and a metaphor for the powerful men and institutions Amos sees as threatening democratic society. The resulting story allows political domination and intimate control to mirror one another.

The opening song, "Shush", establishes this connection. The narrator is sexually and psychologically threatened by the Lizard Demon, who simultaneously rejects the compatibility of freedom and democracy. The song also invokes Cassandra, the mythological prophet whose warnings were destined not to be believed, and concludes by recalling Amos's own "Silent All These Years". The callback turns the narrator's crisis into a confrontation with her younger self and the question of whether the woman who once found her voice still exists.

The title track expands the story into a form of world-building. The narrator realizes that she is changing physically and psychologically, asking whether she has gone from "Beauty" to "Beast". The song also introduces the idea that her own history is implicated in the forces she is now fleeing: she remembers an earlier relationship, a daughter and the luxury into which she had become absorbed. The political crisis is therefore presented as both an external threat and a reckoning with personal choices and complicity.

"Provincetown" marks a change from flight to community. The Massachusetts resort becomes a place of refuge populated by characters who exist outside the hierarchy represented by the Lizard Demon. The song introduces the gay witch from Brooklyn and other figures who provide the narrator with guidance and a sense of chosen community. The instruction to "build a bridge" for those left behind changes the narrator's goal from individual survival to collective resistance.

"St. Teresa" turns the album's attention toward the religious shame that Amos has explored throughout her career. The song invokes Teresa of Ávila and her mystical writings, particularly the imagery of the "Interior Castle" and its seven mansions. Amos has described the song as addressing the way patriarchal religion can use guilt and shame against women's sexuality and desire while retaining her longstanding interest in the possibility of direct spiritual experience.

"Gasoline Girls" and the surrounding songs advance the journey through the southern United States. "Ode to Minnesota", despite its brevity, is one of the album's most explicitly contemporary political moments. Amos wrote it in response to the killing of people by ICE agents and the protests in Minnesota. She described the events as a "sea change" and said the song was the last piece to arrive before the album's deadline.

Motherhood becomes increasingly important as the narrative develops. "Veins", "Strawberry Moon", "Pyrite" and "Stronger Together" were co-written with Amos's daughter, Natashya Hawley, who also provides additional vocals on the album. "Stronger Together" is the emotional resolution of the story: the mother and daughter move from separation and fear toward mutual recognition, safety and solidarity.

The final songs shift the transformation from metaphor into mythology. In "Tempest", Amos incorporates material whose origins date back to a 2005 soundcheck in Germany. At the July 2026 Rough Trade Q&A, she explained that the song had been worked on during several earlier periods, including around Abnormally Attracted to Sin and Night of Hunters, but that the original material was eventually abandoned because its strongest musical section did not fit the surrounding song. The surviving musical tag was later incorporated into "Tempest", with its tempo increased and the orchestration revised accordingly.

"23 Peaks" provides the album's final transformation. Amos has described the song as an improvised performance that emerged while she and Shenale were working in the studio. Shenale asked her to tell the story of how the album's transformation ended; Amos began playing and singing at a keyboard while unaware that Pro Tools was recording. The vocal and keyboard performance heard on the finished track came from that take, which Amos said she could not successfully reproduce when she later attempted to re-record it.

The dragon therefore has several simultaneous meanings. It represents resistance to the Lizard Demon, the emergence of a new form of power, and the physical and psychological transformation associated with aging. Amos has also connected the transformation to menopause, treating the changes to her body and voice not as a loss of identity but as an invitation to become something different.

== Recording ==
The principal recording location for In Times of Dragons was Martian AV, Amos's studio at her home in Cornwall, England, with additional work at Mezzanotte in Los Angeles. Amos's Cornwall studio is located alongside her home and rehearsal facilities, allowing the recording environment to function as part of the same creative space in which she prepared for the 2026 tour.

The album brought Amos back into a room with Matt Chamberlain and Jon Evans for the first time since 2009. Amos said that although she had exchanged musical ideas remotely with them during the pandemic, the experience of physically playing together changed the creative process. She regarded this as one of the principal reasons the finished album felt particularly collaborative.

Chamberlain played drums, percussion, drum programming and electronics, while Evans contributed basses and Mark Hawley played guitars and handled recording. John Philip Shenale supplied synthesizers, samplers and orchestral arrangements. Amos played Bösendorfer grand piano, synthesizers, keyboards and harpsichord in addition to singing and producing.

The album's recording also incorporated material from different periods of Amos's songwriting. "Flood", for example, originated musically approximately fifteen years before the album, with lyrics written much later. "Tempest" likewise incorporated musical material whose origins reached back to a 2005 soundcheck. These examples reflect Amos's tendency to revisit unfinished musical ideas and allow them to acquire new meanings when a later song provides the appropriate context.

"23 Peaks" was recorded under particularly spontaneous circumstances. Shenale asked Amos to explain musically how the story ended, and Amos began playing and singing while unaware that the recording system was running. The resulting take was retained because attempts to reproduce the performance failed to capture the same quality.

In a separate interview, Amos explained that she had been urging the engineers to record "Ode to Minnesota" while the album was already being mixed. She felt that the events it addressed were too important to omit, and the song was recorded despite the late stage of the production process.

== Artwork ==
Amos worked with photographer Kasia Wozniak on the album's artwork. The cover is constructed from multiple photographs of Amos rather than depicting a conventional literal representation of the album's dragons or characters.

The visual presentation continues the album's mixture of mythology and contemporary reality. Rather than presenting the record as conventional fantasy, the artwork places Amos herself at the center of its transformation narrative, reinforcing the connection between the fictional story and the autobiographical elements of the record.

== Release and editions ==
In Times of Dragons was released on May 1, 2026, through Fontana Records. The standard album contains 17 tracks divided across two CDs in its physical edition.

An HMV-exclusive edition was released in the United Kingdom with the additional track "Black Is the New Black". The song was also included on the tour edition of the album.

A digital-only In Times of Dragons (Embers Edition) was also released. It contains the instrumental versions of all 17 songs of the standard tracklisting.

== Tour ==
Amos embarked on the In Times of Dragons Tour in April 2026, beginning in Sheffield, England, and subsequently touring the United Kingdom, Ireland and continental Europe before beginning the North American leg in July. The tour was her first major tour in three years and her largest European tour in approximately a decade.

For the tour, Amos was joined by bassist and musical director Jon Evans, drummer Earl Harvin and three backing vocalists: Liv Gibson, Deni Hlavinka and Hadley Kennary. Amos referred to the backing singers as "angels" or "Angel Witches" and explained that her changing vocal range had made their presence particularly useful for performing portions of her catalogue.

The shows have generally been built around Amos's extensive back catalogue rather than presenting In Times of Dragons as a conventional album-performance tour. "Fire to Your Plain" and "Shush" have served as particularly consistent opening numbers during the 2026 tour. "Cornflake Girl" has remained a frequent encore or closing number, while "Precious Things", "Crucify", "Big Wheel", "Little Amsterdam" and other catalogue songs have repeatedly appeared in different combinations.

The European and early North American shows have differed substantially from night to night. The European leg often paired "Shush" with a second new-album selection, most notably "Stronger Together", while rotating older songs such as "Ruby Through the Looking-Glass", "Putting the Damage On", "Pandora's Aquarium", "Witness", "Black-Dove (January)", "Pretty Good Year" and "God".. The European leg also included several uncommon or location-specific performances, including "Merman", "Code Red", "Tombigbee" and "Riot Poof", as well as covers such as "Rattlesnakes", "Lovesong" and "American Pie".

The North American leg has expanded the representation of the new album. In addition to "Shush", Amos has performed "St. Teresa", "In Times of Dragons", "Song of Sorrow", "Angelshark", "Gasoline Girls" and other songs from the album, with the number and combination of new songs varying substantially between performances. The U.S. leg has also produced several infrequent performances. "Me and a Gun", and covers of "Rattlesnakes", "Famous Blue Raincoat", "Poison & Wine", "American Pie" and "Lovesong" have also been performed.

The variation is intentional. Amos has described songs as having "bloodlines" to particular places or moments and has explained that some songs are only performed when the circumstances feel appropriate. At the July 2026 Rough Trade Q&A, she cited "Upside Down" and her decision to perform "Purple Rain" in Minneapolis as examples of songs whose geographical or emotional connections can determine whether they appear in a particular show.

The variation also allows Amos to draw on different periods of her catalogue without establishing a fixed setlist. She has continued to change songs and arrangements from night to night, making the concerts substantially different experiences even at consecutive performances.

The first three U.S. shows of the tour were also affected by a scheduling change involving the drummer. Earl Harvin was unable to perform the initial Florida dates because of scheduling conflicts and was scheduled to rejoin the tour in New Orleans. Amos, Evans and the backing singers therefore developed specially arranged shows without a drummer for the Florida portion of the tour.

=== Tour reception ===
The tour has generally received strong notices for Amos's musicianship, voice, emotional command and willingness to revisit deep cuts. Reviewing the opening Sheffield show for The Guardian, Daniel Dylan Wray praised the performance's musicianship and described Amos as delivering complex material with "deftness and fluidity". The review highlighted her piano playing and the emotional response of the audience, while noting that the backing vocals occasionally competed with the intimacy of Amos's performance.

The Irish Times gave the Dublin performance four stars, describing the concert as mesmerizing and emphasizing the theatrical quality with which Amos presented the new album's mythology. The review particularly highlighted her explanation of Lugh and the way the concert transformed the album's unusual narrative into a live setting.

Classic Pop awarded the Birmingham performance four stars, praising Amos's willingness to rearrange material across her career and describing the show as an uncompromising presentation of her catalogue. The review also emphasized the contrast between the darker subject matter of the new album and the musical range of the live arrangements.

A review of the Sheffield opening by Music Republic Magazine similarly emphasized the unusual combination of deep cuts, new material and veteran musicians. The publication noted that Earl Harvin was a new drummer for Amos and that the tour marked the first time she had taken three backing vocalists on the road.

The tour's reception has also reflected the appeal of Amos's willingness to make each performance distinct. Rather than reproduce a fixed greatest-hits program, the shows have rotated deep cuts, album tracks, covers and songs connected to particular locations. The resulting unpredictability has been a recurring source of enthusiasm among fans, while critics have continued to emphasize her piano playing and the emotional intensity of her performances.

In Times of Dragons Tour dates
Date	Venue	Location
April 8, 2026	City Hall	Sheffield, England
April 10, 2026	Bridgewater Hall	Manchester, England
April 11, 2026	Usher Hall	Edinburgh, Scotland
April 13, 2026	OVO Arena Wembley	London, England
April 15, 2026	Symphony Hall	Birmingham, England
April 17, 2026	Motorpoint Arena	Cardiff, Wales
April 18, 2026	3Arena	Dublin, Ireland
April 21, 2026	Royal Albert Hall	London, England
April 23, 2026	AFAS Live	Amsterdam, Netherlands
April 25, 2026	Forest National	Brussels, Belgium
April 27, 2026	Tempodrom	Berlin, Germany
April 28, 2026	Mehr! Theater	Hamburg, Germany
April 30, 2026	Volkshaus	Zürich, Switzerland
May 2, 2026	Wiener Stadthalle	Vienna, Austria
May 4, 2026	Tonhalle	Munich, Germany
May 6, 2026	Cirque Royal	Brussels, Belgium
May 8, 2026	Le Zénith	Paris, France
May 10, 2026	L'Olympia	Paris, France
May 12, 2026	Palau Sant Jordi	Barcelona, Spain
May 14, 2026	Coliseum	Lisbon, Portugal
May 17, 2026	Teatro degli Arcimboldi	Milan, Italy
May 19, 2026	Falconer Salen	Copenhagen, Denmark
May 21, 2026	Sentrum Scene	Oslo, Norway
May 23, 2026	Cirkus	Stockholm, Sweden
May 25, 2026	Veikkaus Arena	Helsinki, Finland
May 27, 2026	Alexela Kontserdimaja	Tallinn, Estonia
May 29, 2026	Xiaomi Arena	Riga, Latvia
May 31, 2026	Twinsbet Arena	Vilnius, Lithuania
July 7, 2026	Dreyfoos Hall, Kravis Center for the Performing Arts	West Palm Beach, Florida
July 9, 2026	Dr. Phillips Center for the Performing Arts	Orlando, Florida
July 10, 2026	Ruth Eckerd Hall	Clearwater, Florida
July 12, 2026	Saenger Performing Arts Theater	New Orleans, Louisiana
July 14, 2026	ACL Live at The Moody Theater	Austin, Texas
July 15, 2026	Winspear Opera House	Dallas, Texas
July 20, 2026	Durham Performing Arts Center	Durham, North Carolina
July 22, 2026	Wolf Trap National Park for the Performing Arts	Vienna, Virginia
July 24, 2026	Beacon Theatre	New York, New York
July 25, 2026	Beacon Theatre	New York, New York
July 27, 2026	Hershey Theatre	Hershey, Pennsylvania
July 29, 2026	Merrill Auditorium	Portland, Maine
July 31, 2026	Leader Bank Pavilion	Boston, Massachusetts
August 1, 2026	Metropolitan Opera House	Philadelphia, Pennsylvania
August 3, 2026	Landmark Theatre	Syracuse, New York
August 10, 2026	Louisville Palace Theatre	Louisville, Kentucky
August 11, 2026	Old National Centre	Indianapolis, Indiana
August 15, 2026	The Riverside Theater	Milwaukee, Wisconsin
August 17, 2026	Stifel Theatre	St. Louis, Missouri
August 18, 2026	Orpheum Theater	Omaha, Nebraska
August 20, 2026	Red Rocks Amphitheatre	Morrison, Colorado
August 22, 2026	Popejoy Hall	Albuquerque, New Mexico
August 23, 2026	Arizona Financial Theatre	Phoenix, Arizona
August 25, 2026	The Greek Theatre	Los Angeles, California
August 26, 2026	San Diego Civic Theatre	San Diego, California
August 28, 2026	Vina Robles Amphitheatre	Paso Robles, California
August 29, 2026	The Greek Theatre	Berkeley, California
August 31, 2026	SAFE Credit Union Performing Arts Center	Sacramento, California
September 2, 2026	Chateau Ste. Michelle Winery	Woodinville, Washington

== Critical reception ==
Professional ratings
Aggregate scores
Source	Rating
Metacritic	82/100
Review scores
Source	Rating
AllMusic	4.5/5 stars
The Irish Times	3/5 stars
Pitchfork	6.8/10
PopMatters	9/10
Rolling Stone	3.5/5 stars
Uncut	8/10

In Times of Dragons received broadly positive reviews from music critics. The album received a score of 82 out of 100 on Metacritic, based on 13 critic reviews, with all 13 categorized as positive.

Several critics regarded the album as a significant late-career achievement. Neil Z. Yeung of AllMusic described it as one of the best albums of Amos's career, emphasizing its emotional weight, boldness and complex narrative. He praised the way its topical themes transform trauma and despair into hope and argued that it represented a return to the artistic intensity associated with several of Amos's most highly regarded albums.

Classic Rock described it as a work that "breathes fire".

PopMatters praised the album's treatment of suppressed voice and transformation, calling the closing track "23 Peaks" a particularly extraordinary achievement. The review regarded the album's elaborate narrative as only part of its appeal, emphasizing Amos's continuing development as a musician, storyteller and woman rather than reducing the record to its political concept.

Uncut praised the album's density and ambition while noting that its darkness is balanced by moments of light. The magazine characterized it as a rich and sometimes overwhelming record whose rewards emerge gradually rather than immediately.

Mojo similarly emphasized the album's delayed rewards, comparing its approach to Scarlet's Walk and American Doll Posse and arguing that its elaborate construction becomes increasingly rewarding with repeated listening.

Rolling Stone gave the album three and a half stars out of five, praising Amos's lower, world-weary vocal register and her precisely controlled piano playing. The review described the album as a dense continuation of her longstanding interest in womanhood, mythology and social power, while emphasizing the contrast between its fantastical narrative and its contemporary political subject matter.

Other positive reviews highlighted the album's ambition, atmosphere and connection to Amos's earlier work. The Line of Best Fit praised its emphasis on love and solidarity, while the German edition of Rolling Stone emphasized Amos's ability to transform contemporary political anxiety into beauty through metaphor and piano-driven songs.

Some reviews were more reserved. Pitchfork praised "Provincetown" as a particularly strong return to form and singled out "Blue Lotus", but felt that the album's more literal political writing reduced some of the mystery associated with Amos's earlier work. The Irish Times similarly regarded the album as more compelling than some of Amos's recent work but found its competing mythological and political narratives uneven. These reservations were relatively limited in the context of the album's overall critical reception.

== Track listing ==
All tracks are written by Tori Amos; "Veins", "Strawberry Moon", and "Stronger Together" written with Natashya Hawley.

In Times of Dragons track listing
No.	Title	Length
1.	"Shush"	6:15
2.	"In Times of Dragons"	4:50
3.	"Provincetown"	5:06
4.	"St. Teresa"	6:19
5.	"Gasoline Girls"	2:56
6.	"Ode to Minnesota"	1:34
7.	"Fanny Faudrey"	1:47
8.	"Veins"	3:59
9.	"Strawberry Moon"	4:10
10.	"Song of Sorrow"	6:19
11.	"Flood"	4:03
12.	"Pyrite"	3:34
13.	"Tempest"	5:18
14.	"Angelshark"	3:47
15.	"Blue Lotus"	6:03
16.	"Stronger Together"	3:14
17.	"23 Peaks"	6:42
Total length:		75:56

HMV Exclusive with bonus track
No.	Title	Length
18.	"Black Is the New Black"	3:33
Total length:		79:29

== Personnel ==
Credits are adapted from the album's liner notes.

- Tori Amos – Bösendorfer, synthesizers, keyboards, harpsichord, vocals, producer
- Matt Chamberlain – drums, percussion, drum programming, electronics
- Jon Evans – basses
- Mark Hawley – all guitars, recording
- John Philip Shenale – synthesizers, samplers, orchestral arrangements
- Natashya Hawley – additional vocals on "Veins", "Strawberry Moon", "Pyrite", and "Stronger Together"
- Adrian Hall – mixing
- Mark Hawley – mixing
- Adam Spry – assistant engineering
- Jon Astley – mastering
- Miles Showell – vinyl mastering
- Graham Sharland – piano and harpsichord technician
- Kasia Wozniak – photography
- Karen Binns – creative direction, styling
- Y-Lan Lucas – set design
- Adam Livemore – hair design, hair styling
- Matt Read – package design

== Charts ==
Chart performance for In Times of Dragons
Chart (2026)	Peak position
Australian Albums (ARIA)	56
Austrian Albums (Ö3 Austria)	14
Belgian Albums (Ultratop Flanders)	15
Belgian Albums (Ultratop Wallonia)	28
Croatian International Albums (HDU)	36
Dutch Albums (Album Top 100)	36
Finnish Albums (Suomen virallinen lista)	46
French Albums (SNEP)	168
German Albums (Offizielle Top 100)	6
German Pop Albums (Offizielle Top 100)	4
Polish Albums (ZPAV)	38
Scottish Albums (Official Charts)	5
Swiss Albums (Schweizer Hitparade)	10
UK Albums (Official Charts)	13
US Top Album Sales (Billboard)	10
