= The Music of Tori and the Muses =

2025 soundtrack / studio album by Tori Amos

Soundtrack album / studio album by Tori Amos
- Released: February 28, 2025
- Length: 37:03
- Labels: Universal; Faerie Workshop Rekords
- Producer: Tori Amos

Tori Amos chronology
Diving Deep Live (2024)	The Music of Tori and the Muses (2025)	In Times of Dragons (2026)

The Music of Tori and the Muses is a soundtrack album by American singer-songwriter and pianist Tori Amos. It is the soundtrack to the children's book Tori and the Muses and was surprise-released on February 28, 2025. The album features Amos's frequent collaborators Jon Evans, Matt Chamberlain, Ash Soan, John Philip Shenale, and Amos's husband, Mark Hawley.

The album was nominated for a Grammy Award for Best Children's Music Album in 2025.

== Track listing ==
All tracks are written by Tori Amos.

The Music of Tori and the Muses track listing
No.	Title	Length
1.	"Knocking"	2:11
2.	"Day and Night (from the Faerie Workshop)"	4:08
3.	"Building a Mountain"	6:00
4.	"Insect Ballet"	5:55
5.	"Anna's Bakery"	3:38
6.	"Mermaid Muse Speaks"	4:09
7.	"Spike's Lament"	2:47
8.	"Rain Brings Change"	3:48
9.	"S'Magic Day"	4:27
Total length:		37:03

== Personnel ==
=== Musicians ===
- Tori Amos – vocals, Bösendorfer piano (tracks 1–6, 8, 9); keyboards, loops (1); Wurlitzer (3), synthesizer (4), Rhodes piano (7)
- Mark Hawley – guitar (tracks 1, 5, 7–9)
- Jon Evans – loops (1, 2), upright bass (1, 5), bass (2–5, 7–9), keyboards (2), synthesizer (8)
- Ash Soan – drums, percussion (tracks 1, 7, 8)
- Matt Chamberlain – drums, percussion (tracks 2–5, 9)
- John Philip Shenale – orchestra (2–4, 6), prepared piano (2), modular synthesizer (6); Chamberlin strings, Hammond organ, synthesizer (7)

=== Technical personnel ===
- Tori Amos - production
- Mark Hawley – engineering, mixing
- Adam Spry – engineering assistance
- Jon Evans – additional engineering (tracks 1–7, 9)
- Jon Evans – additional engineering (tracks 1–7, 9)
- John Philip Shenale – additional engineering (tracks 2–4, 6, 7)
- Adrian Hall – mixing
- Jon Astley – mastering

== Charts ==
Chart performance for The Music of Tori and the Muses
Chart (2025)	Peak position
UK Album Downloads (Official Charts)	48
