= Gold Dust (Tori Amos album) =

2012 studio album by Tori Amos

Studio album by Tori Amos
- Released: October 1, 2012
- Recorded: 2012
- Studios: MCO (Hilversum); Martian Engineering (Cornwall)
- Length: 61:15
- Labels: Deutsche Grammophon, Mercury Classics
- Producer: Tori Amos

Tori Amos chronology
Night of Hunters (2011)	Gold Dust (2012)	Unrepentant Geraldines (2014)

Singles from Gold Dust
- 1. "Flavor" Released: September 6, 2012

Gold Dust is the thirteenth solo studio album by American singer-songwriter and pianist Tori Amos, released on October 1, 2012, by Deutsche Grammophon and Mercury Classics. The album is produced by Amos with arrangements by long-time collaborator John Philip Shenale. Inspired by and following in a similar vein as Amos's previous effort, the classical music album Night of Hunters (2011), Gold Dust features some of her previously released alternative rock and baroque pop songs re-worked in an orchestral setting. The material for Gold Dust, consisting of songs selected by Amos spanning almost her entire catalogue at the time, from Little Earthquakes (1992) through Midwinter Graces (2009), was recorded with the Metropole Orchestra, conducted by Jules Buckley.

== Background ==
The stimulus to Gold Dust was a concert where Amos performed with the Metropole Orchestra as part of a "Week of the Metropole" series. The concert, performed at the Heineken Music Hall in Amsterdam on October 8, 2010, was the first orchestral concert of Amos's career, and set the stage for recording the tracks that would comprise Gold Dust.

The project commemorates the 20th anniversary of the release of her debut solo album Little Earthquakes, as well as the music released since then. The collection has autobiographical leanings, with Amos opting for songs that represent a personal narrative instead of including a string of singles. Of the songs included in the project, Amos said, "[they are] a collection of new studio recordings of where they are now and who they have become". Gold Dust mostly consists of songs culled from the 2010 Metropole Orchestra concert. While the original set list from the concert focused heavily on Amos's then-recent holiday album, Midwinter Graces, the focus for Gold Dust shifts with four of the album's 14 tracks from the Little Earthquakes era. In addition, three songs which were not performed during the concert were reworked for orchestra and added to extend the span of the collection over Amos's music catalogue.

== Critical reception ==
Professional ratings
Aggregate scores
Source	Rating
Metacritic	68/100
Review scores
Source	Rating
AllMusic	3/5 stars
American Songwriter	4/5 stars
The A.V. Club	C+
Paste	8.7/10
Slant Magazine	3/5 stars

According to the review aggregator Metacritic, Gold Dust received "generally favorable reviews" based on a weighted average score of 68 out of 100 from 13 critic scores. American Songwriter gave a glowing review of Gold Dust, stating that often Amos improves upon original versions of the songs and praising her skills as a musician, vocalist, and tunesmith.

== Track listing ==
All tracks are written by Tori Amos.

Gold Dust track listing
No.	Title	Original recording	Length
1.	"Flavor"	Abnormally Attracted to Sin; 2009	4:08
2.	"Yes, Anastasia"	Under the Pink; 1994	4:17
3.	"Jackie's Strength"	From the Choirgirl Hotel; 1998	4:32
4.	"Cloud on My Tongue"	Under the Pink; 1994	4:23
5.	"Precious Things"	Little Earthquakes; 1992	4:44
6.	"Gold Dust"	Scarlet's Walk; 2002	5:45
7.	"Star of Wonder"	Midwinter Graces; 2009	3:46
8.	"Winter"	Little Earthquakes; 1992	5:45
9.	"Flying Dutchman"	"China" single; 1992	6:21
10.	"Programmable Soda"	American Doll Posse; 2007	1:27
11.	"Snow Cherries from France"	Tales of a Librarian; 2003	3:01
12.	"Marianne"	Boys for Pele; 1996	4:08
13.	"Silent All These Years"	Little Earthquakes; 1992	4:33
14.	"Girl Disappearing"	American Doll Posse; 2007	4:06
15.	"Maybe California" (iTunes and Japan edition bonus track)	Abnormally Attracted To Sin; 2009	4:20
16.	"Snow Angel" (Japan edition bonus track)	Midwinter Graces; 2009	3:42
Total length:			61:15

== Personnel ==
- Tori Amos – vocals, Bösendorfer piano, record producer
- John Philip Shenale – arrangements
- Jules Buckley – conductor
- Janine Abbas – Flute
- Jascha Albracht – cello
- Julia Jowett – viola
- Jan Oosting – trombone
- Juliane Gralle – bass trombone
- Jos Beeren – clarinet, saxophone
- Joke Schonewille – harp
- Karen Binns – stylist
- Max Boeree – clarinet, saxophone
- Ruud Breuls – trumpet
- Ray Bruinsma – trumpet
- Polina Cekov – violin
- Marie-Cécile de Wit – Flute
- Martijn DeLaat – trumpet
- Tjerk DeVos – Contrabass
- Lucja Domski – violin
- Casper Donker – violin
- Paul van der Feen – clarinet, saxophone
- Wim Grin – cello
- Mark Hawley – engineer, mixer
- Henk Heijink – artistic producer
- Mieke Honingh – viola
- Pieter Hunfeld – French horn
- Maarten Jansen – cello
- Norman Jansen – viola
- Leo Janssen – clarinet, saxophone
- Murk Jiskoot – percussion
- Sarah Koch – violin
- Dennis Koenders – violin
- Wim Kok – violin
- Pauline Koning – violin
- Eddy Koopman – percussion
- Roel Koster – French horn
- Vera Laporeva – violin
- Danielle Levitt – cover photo, photography
- Arend Liefkes – contrabass
- Elizabeth Liefkes-Cats – violin
- Willem Luijt – Oboe
- Ruben Margarita – violin
- Dennis Martin – photography
- Dirk Overeem – assistant engineer
- Isabella Petersen – viola
- Bert Pfeiffer – trombone
- Marijn Rombout – violin
- Arlia de Ruiter – violin
- Martin De Ruiter – oboe
- Marc Scholten – clarinet, saxophone
- Iris Schut – viola
- Sean Mosher-Smith – photography
- Jasper Soffers – keyboards
- Annie Tangberg – cello
- Jos Teeken – cello
- Seija Teeuwen – violin
- Pauline Terlouw – violin
- Martin van den Berg – bass trombone
- Mariël Van Den Bos – flute
- Vera Van Der Bie – violin
- Marianne Van Den Heuvel – violin
- Herman Van Haaren – violin
- Feyona van Iersel – violin
- Bart Van Lier – trombone
- Marcel Van Limbeek – engineer, mixer
- Emile Visser – cello
- Hans Vroomans – keyboards
- Frank Wardenier – percussion
- Eric Winkelmann – contrabass

== Charts ==
The chart below lists the peak positions for Gold Dust on various music charts around the world.

Chart (2012)	Peak position
Australian Albums (ARIA)	60
Austrian Albums (Ö3 Austria)	46
Belgian Albums (Ultratop Flanders)	27
Belgian Albums (Ultratop Wallonia)	55
Dutch Albums (Album Top 100)	24
French Albums (SNEP)	156
German Albums (Offizielle Top 100)	48
Italian Albums (FIMI)	53
Swiss Albums (Schweizer Hitparade)	95
UK Albums (OCC)	36
US Billboard 200	63
US Top Alternative Albums (Billboard)	16
US Top Classical Albums (Billboard)	3
US Billboard Top Rock Albums (Billboard)	25
US Top Tastemakers (Billboard)	23
