= Ocean to Ocean =

Studio album by Tori Amos
- Released: October 29, 2021
- Recorded: 2021
- Studios: Martian Engineering Studios (Cornwall, UK); Cyclops Sound Studio (Los Angeles, California); Studio Mezzanotte (Los Angeles, California); Brickhill Studios (Orleans, Massachusetts)
- Genres: Alternative rock; chamber pop; pop rock
- Length: 47:38
- Label: Decca
- Producer: Tori Amos

Tori Amos chronology
| Christmastide (2020) | Ocean to Ocean (2021) | Little Earthquakes – The B-Sides (2023) |

Singles from Ocean to Ocean
- 1. "Speaking with Trees" Released: September 29, 2021; 2. "Spies" Released: October 14, 2021

Ocean to Ocean is the sixteenth studio album by American singer-songwriter and pianist Tori Amos. It was released on October 29, 2021, through Decca Records. The album was written during lockdown from the COVID-19 pandemic in Cornwall, England and featured the musicians collaborating remotely, with recording occurring in England, California, and Massachusetts. It is Amos's first studio album since Midwinter Graces (2009) to feature her typical backing band of Matt Chamberlain on drums, Jon Evans on bass, and Mac Aladdin on guitar.

Amos described the album as "a record about your losses, and how you cope with them." The pandemic, lockdown, and death of Amos's mother all heavily influenced the lyrical content throughout the album. Musically, the album retains her signature piano-centric sound; her daughter Natashya Hawley contributes backing vocals on three tracks.

Despite stalling at number 104 on the Billboard 200, Ocean to Ocean received highly positive reviews from critics. The album reached the top 40 in six countries, including the UK where it peaked at number 25. Amos promoted the album through the release of the singles "Speaking with Trees" and "Spies" alongside the Ocean to Ocean Tour, which started in 2022 in London, England and ended in 2023 in Seattle, Washington.

== Background ==
Ocean to Ocean is the second release of new material by Amos during the COVID-19 pandemic, after the Christmastide EP in 2020. Through the beginning of 2021, she had already prepared an album's worth of songs; however, she felt the songs did not express sentiments she wanted to express at the time, stating that "these songs, when I would play them back, I would just think 'this is not taking me where I need to go out of this tonality that is toxic'".

Instead, Amos wrote and recorded a new batch of songs inspired by "the county [Cornwall]'s landscapes and ancient myths". Additionally, some of the lyrics on the album were said to be a reaction to the 2021 United States Capitol attack.

== Recording ==
Due to Cornwall being under lockdown during the pandemic, all instruments aside from the piano were recorded outside of Martian Engineering Studios without Amos's presence. Tracks were first sent to Chamberlain and then to Evans, with string arrangements by John Philip Shenale or backing vocals by Tash being the last additions. The musicians were not aware of how the others' contributions would affect the song until later in recording; Amos cited the recording of "29 Years" as an example of this dynamic: "[Matt] had no idea, once it left him, anything was going to happen. So I think it probably shocked the hell out of him that Jon Evans took '29 Years' to that Police kind of groove."

During mastering, the sequencing of the album was being discussed. It was considered to open the album with "Metal Water Wood" but ultimately was deemed to be "too literal". The placement of it and of "Devil's Bane" was a point of contention, with a faction of those involved wanted the latter placed farther down the album whereas another faction wanted it earlier.

== Music and lyrics ==
"Addition of Light Divided" was inspired by a visit to a cave in Nanjizal Beach (which can be seen on the album artwork). Amos referenced the detrimental effect of lockdown on personal relationships as an inspiration on the song's lyrics, citing her separation from her niece as a result of the pandemic. Lead single "Speaking with Trees" directly confronts the death of Amos' mother and contains themes of connection to nature.

For 'Addition of Light...', we really wanted to create this [...] vocal… not 'coven' that surrounded (my niece) but kind of [...] and we really wanted to, through voice, almost create this circle of light around her that would find her in New York at this particular time when we did it.

— Tori Amos on the vocal arrangements for "Addition of Light Divided"

== Other songs ==
Speaking about a track named "Ballerina":

There was a song on the (shelved) record ...called 'Ballerina' and I'm not sure how that got conjured. I can't remember what drove me to write it but I think [...] I began writing it in Florida, and when I'm on my own in Florida, conjuring starts to happen, imagination starts to happen, maybe fears start to happen. [...] An archetypal worst fear for some women is when the love of their life falls in love with a younger woman...so I wanted to I think explore it as a myth, as an idea, and I knew people who were going through this. [...] I didn't feel that those details [of those people] were going to 'magic' the story, so I did something. [...] There we are in Cornwall in the pantry this year and I'm thinking 'Ballerina, maybe she can make the record' and (my daughter's boyfriend) goes 'Ballerina -- is that about you and Mark?' and I said 'no, n-n-no.' He said 'but it is--' and I said 'n-n-n-n-n-no!' and then later on it became clear: 'Oh my god, what have I done?' [...] We're shooting the album cover and we're talking about the archetype of the witch and what the witch was doing, and the malevolent witch versus the benevolent witch, and that my malevolent witch was getting me to maybe lose my marriage and put a bomb in my marriage bed. [...] I have a good marriage, so it's like 'Where is the saboteur? What is this?' [...] 'Ballerina' gets thrown off the stage. [...] I really had to surrender and say 'No, I'm not going to do that.' And then all of a sudden just out of nowhere comes the line with the chords with the melody with (the first line of 'Swim to New York State').

Recording for a 9-minute song named "Chiron" was not completed due to time constraints in order to complete "Addition of Light Divided".

== Critical reception ==
Professional ratings
Aggregate scores
| Source | Rating |
|---|---|
| Metacritic | 81/100 |
Review scores
| Source | Rating |
| Pitchfork | 7.3/10 |
| PopMatters | 8/10 |

Ocean to Ocean received universal acclaim from music critics upon release. The album received a score of 81 out of 100 on the review aggregator website Metacritic, based on nine reviews, making it Amos' most well-received album since Metacritic began tracking reviews in 2001.

== Track listing ==
All tracks are written by Tori Amos.

Ocean to Ocean track listing
| No. | Title | Length |
|---|---|---|
| 1. | "Addition of Light Divided" | 4:05 |
| 2. | "Speaking with Trees" | 3:55 |
| 3. | "Devil's Bane" | 4:32 |
| 4. | "Swim to New York State" | 4:20 |
| 5. | "Spies" | 5:59 |
| 6. | "Ocean to Ocean" | 3:30 |
| 7. | "Flowers Burn to Gold" | 3:41 |
| 8. | "Metal Water Wood" | 4:00 |
| 9. | "29 Years" | 4:47 |
| 10. | "How Glass Is Made" | 3:56 |
| 11. | "Birthday Baby" | 4:44 |
| Total length: | | 47:38 |

== Personnel ==
Musicians

- Tori Amos – vocals, Bösendorfer piano (all tracks); Hammond B3, Yamaha CP 88, Rhodes, Wurlitzer electric piano (1–6, 8–11)
- John Philip Shenale – Marxophone, Optigan, sampling, synthesizer (all tracks); additional keyboards (1, 3–5, 11), Hammond organ (4, 5, 11)
- Tash – additional vocals (1–3)
- Jon Evans – bass (1–6, 8–11)
- Matt Chamberlain – drums, percussion (1–6, 8–11)
- Mark Hawley – guitar (1–6, 8–11), dobro (2, 3)

Technical

- Ann Walker – piano technician
- Mark Hawley – recording, mixing
- Jon Evans – recording (1–6, 8–11)
- John Philip Shenale – recording (1, 3–5, 11)
- Matt Chamberlain – recording (1–6, 8–11)
- Adam Spry – recording assistance
- Adrian Hall – mixing
- Jon Astley – mastering
- Miles Showell – vinyl mastering

Artwork and design

- Matt Read – package design
- Desmond Murray – photography, hair stylist
- Kavita Kaul – make-up

== Charts ==
Chart performance for Ocean to Ocean
| Chart (2021–2022) | Peak position |
|---|---|
| Australian Albums (ARIA) | 46 |
| Austrian Albums (Ö3 Austria) | 23 |
| Belgian Albums (Ultratop Flanders) | 54 |
| Belgian Albums (Ultratop Wallonia) | 57 |
| Dutch Albums (Album Top 100) | 58 |
| French Albums (SNEP) | 200 |
| German Albums (Offizielle Top 100) | 26 |
| Irish Albums (IRMA) | 96 |
| Polish Albums (ZPAV) | 34 |
| Scottish Albums (Official Charts) | 19 |
| Swiss Albums (Schweizer Hitparade) | 15 |
| UK Albums (Official Charts) | 25 |
| US Billboard 200 | 104 |
| US Top Alternative Albums (Billboard) | 9 |
| US Top Rock Albums (Billboard) | 16 |
| US Top Album Sales (Billboard) | 6 |
