= Flavor (Tori Amos song) =

2012 single by Tori Amos

Single by Tori Amos

from the album Gold Dust
- Released: September 6, 2012
- Studio: Martian Engineering (Cornwall)
- Genre: Classical (2012 version): Trip hop; downtempo (2009 version)
- Length: 4:08 (2012 version); 4:05 (2009 version)
- Label: Deutsche Grammophon; Mercury Classics
- Songwriter: Tori Amos
- Producer: Tori Amos

Tori Amos singles chronology
"Carry" (2011)	"Flavor" (2012)	"Trouble's Lament" (2014)

"Flavor" is a song written and recorded by American singer-songwriter and pianist Tori Amos, originally appearing on her tenth solo studio album Abnormally Attracted to Sin (2009) as a down-tempo song, and later released as the lead single from her thirteenth studio album Gold Dust (2012) which features classical rearrangements of selected songs from her oeuvre. Amos stated she felt the song was overlooked on its original album and had to be re-worked and noticed on Gold Dust.

== Music video ==
The music video for "Flavor" was directed by Danielle Levitt and it features Amos walking the streets of New York City and encountering many different people, including skaters, gospel women from Harlem, drag queens, and breakdancers.

== Peter Rauhofer mixes ==
In 2012 Peter Rauhofer, known for his dance remixes of several well known hits from artists including Cher, Madonna, Yoko Ono, and Pink, among others, was commissioned to remix the first single lifted from Gold Dust. An EP containing four remixes was released in late 2012. "Flavor" reached #1 on the Hot Dance Club Play chart in February 2013. This remix was Rauhofer's last mainstream release before his death in 2013.

== Track listing ==
1. "Flavor" (Club Mix) – 7:35
2. "Flavor" (Big Room Mix) – 9:00
3. "Flavor" (Old Skool Dub Mix) – 7:07
4. "Flavor" (Club Mix Radio Edit) – 4:00

== Personnel ==
- Tori Amos – vocals, Bösendorfer piano, production
- John Philip Shenale – arrangements

== Charts ==
=== Weekly charts ===
Chart (2013)	Peak position
US Dance Club Songs (Billboard)	1
US Dance Singles Sales (Billboard)	1

=== Year-end charts ===
Chart (2013)	Position
US Dance Club Songs (Billboard)	42

== See also ==
- List of number-one dance singles of 2013 (U.S.)
