= Tori Amos discography =

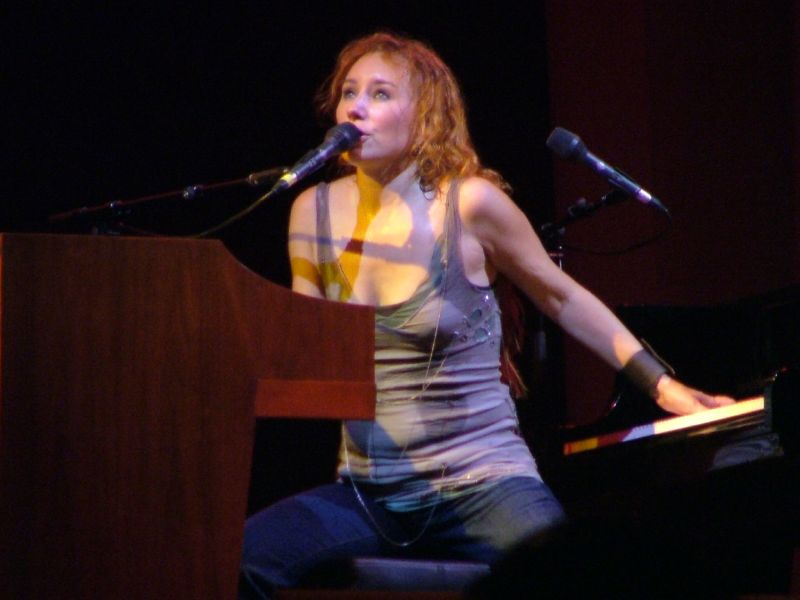
- Amos performing at the Glastonbury Festival in Pilton, Somerset, 2005
- Studio albums: 18
- Extended plays: 6
- Soundtrack albums: 12
- Live albums: 2
- Compilation albums: 3
- Tribute albums: 2
- Singles: 40
- B-sides: 69
- Video albums: 8
- Music videos: 28
- Official bootlegs: 33
- Other contributions: 5
- Side projects: 8

Tori Amos is an American singer-songwriter and pianist whose musical career began in 1980, at the age of 17, when she and her brother co-wrote the song "Baltimore". The song was selected as the winning song in a contest for the Baltimore Orioles and was recorded and pressed locally as a 7" single. From 1984 to 1989, Amos fronted the synth-pop band Y Kant Tori Read, which released one eponymous studio album with Atlantic Records in 1988 before breaking up. Shortly thereafter, Amos began writing and recording material that would serve as the debut of her solo career. Still signed with Atlantic, and its UK counterpart East West, Amos' initial solo material was rejected by the label in 1990. Under the guidance of co-producers Eric Rosse, Davitt Sigerson and Ian Stanley, a second version of the album was created and accepted by the label the following year.

Amos' solo career began in October 1991 with the UK release of the Me and a Gun extended play (EP). The following month, after the first track on the EP was receiving more airplay than the title track, the label reissued the EP with the same artwork, but changed the title to Silent All These Years. Although the second version of the EP reached only No. 51 on the UK chart, BBC Radio 1 picked it as "Record of the Week", which helped Amos get her initial exposure. Her debut solo studio album, Little Earthquakes, was released two months later in January 1992. The album peaked at No. 14 on the Australian and UK Albums Chart and at No. 54 on the U.S. Billboard 200. Upon its release, the album received mostly positive reviews and was labeled an important album that kick-started the female singer-songwriter movement of the 1990s. Despite reaching only No. 54 on the Billboard 200, Little Earthquakes was a mainstay on the chart for 38 weeks and remains Amos' highest-selling album in the United States.

Subsequent albums with Atlantic were released at approximately two-year intervals. Amos' sophomore effort, Under the Pink, co-produced with Eric Rosse, debuted in February 1994 at number 12 on the Billboard 200 and number 1 on the UK Albums Chart. Boys for Pele, Amos' third solo album and the first album that was self-produced, debuted in January 1996 at number 2 on both the US and UK charts, making it her highest simultaneous trans-Atlantic debut. From the Choirgirl Hotel, Amos' first album written and recorded with bandmates Matt Chamberlain on drums, Jon Evans on bass and Steve Caton on guitar, and her first album recorded at her in-home recording studio, Martian Engineering, debuted in May 1998 at number 5 on the Billboard 200 and at number 6 on the UK Albums Chart. The following year, To Venus and Back, a double album of studio and live material recorded with Chamberlain, Evans and Caton, debuted in September 1999 at number 12 in the US and at number 22 in the UK. In September 2001, Strange Little Girls, a covers album recorded with Chamberlin on drums, Evans and Justin Meldal-Johnsen on bass and Adrian Belew on guitar, debuted at number 4 on the Billboard 200 and at number 16 on the UK Albums Chart.

Due to professional conflicts, after working with Atlantic for the first 15 years of her career, Amos decided to seek another label. She joined Epic Records and released three albums over the next five years: Scarlet's Walk in October 2002, The Beekeeper in February 2005 and American Doll Posse in May 2007. On all three albums, Amos performed with Chamberlin on drums, Evans on bass and Mac Aladdin on guitar. Each album debuted in the Top 10 of the Billboard 200, placing Amos in an elite group of women who have secured five or more Top 10 album debuts. Amos negotiated an end to her contract with Epic following the release of American Doll Posse, announcing in 2008 that she will be operating independently of record labels. In early 2009, Amos signed a distribution, or joint-venture, deal with Universal Republic Records, a division of Universal Music Group, which granted her greater creative control over her work than traditional recording contracts. Amos released two albums her first year under the contract: Abnormally Attracted to Sin in May 2009 and the seasonal album Midwinter Graces, featuring reworked Christmas carols and some original songs, in November 2009. Abnormally Attracted to Sin is Amos's seventh album to debut on the US Top 10 on the Billboard 200. Amos followed up with her first classical music album, Night of Hunters, recorded with Andreas Ottensamer of the Berlin Philharmonic and the award-winning string quartet, Apollon Musagète. Night of Hunters was released in September 2011, through the Deutsche Grammophon label, the classical music division of Universal Music Group. With Night of Hunters, Amos made Billboard history by being the first female artist to have an album place in the Top 10 of the Classical, Alternative, and Rock charts simultaneously.

To date in her solo career, Amos has recorded and released a total of 16 solo studio albums, multiple live releases, three compilation albums, one of which is a five-disc box set released through Rhino Entertainment, and numerous singles and EPs. Amos has contributed to numerous film soundtracks as well.

== Albums ==
=== Studio albums ===
List of albums, with selected chart positions
Title	Album details	Peak chart positions										Sales	Certifications
Title	Album details	US	AUS	AUT	BEL (Fl)	CAN	FRA	GER	NL	SWI	UK	Sales	Certifications
Little Earthquakes	Released: January 6, 1992; Label: Atlantic, East West	54	14	—	—	49	43	65	71	—	14	WW: 3,000,000; US: 1,900,000; CAN: 60,000; UK: 200,000	RIAA: 2× Platinum; ARIA: Gold; BEA: Gold; BPI: Gold; MC: Gold; NVPI: Gold
Under the Pink	Released: January 31, 1994; Label: Atlantic, East West	12	5	6	—	11	20	15	10	11	1	WW: 2,000,000; US: 1,400,000; CAN: 42,000	RIAA: 2× Platinum; ARIA: Platinum; BPI: Platinum; MC: Gold; NVPI: Gold
Boys for Pele	Released: January 22, 1996; Label: Atlantic, East West	2	6	9	8	6	33	9	6	14	2	WW: 2,000,000; US: 1,000,000	RIAA: Platinum; ARIA: Gold; BPI: Gold; MC: Gold
From the Choirgirl Hotel	Released: May 4, 1998; Label: Atlantic, East West	5	8	11	13	10	30	13	24	31	6	US: 778,000	RIAA: Platinum; BPI: Gold; MC: Gold
To Venus and Back	Released: September 21, 1999; Label: Atlantic	12	6	17	13	18	31	11	24	27	22	US: 458,000	RIAA: Platinum
Strange Little Girls	Released: September 18, 2001; Label: Atlantic	4	7	18	6	8	26	11	27	34	16	US: 395,000	
Scarlet's Walk	Released: October 28, 2002; Label: Epic, Sony Music	7	20	26	15	13	32	9	17	21	26	US: 618,000	RIAA: Gold
The Beekeeper	Released: February 20, 2005; Label: Epic, Sony BMG	5	20	8	11	16	44	8	13	13	24	US: 295,000	
American Doll Posse	Released: May 1, 2007; Label: Epic, Sony BMG	5	20	14	22	15	48	10	5	15	50	US: 152,000	
Abnormally Attracted to Sin	Released: May 18, 2009; Label: Universal Republic	9	28	12	23	24	61	16	22	14	20	US: 92,000	
Midwinter Graces	Released: November 10, 2009; Label: Universal Republic	66	152	—	—	—	133	—	99	—	97	UK: 2,619	
Night of Hunters	Released: September 20, 2011; Label: Deutsche Grammophon	24	42	22	25	38	70	12	34	33	27	US: 18,000	
Gold Dust	Released: October 1, 2012; Label: Deutsche Grammophon, Mercury Classics	63	60	46	27	—	156	48	24	95	36	UK: 3,791	
Unrepentant Geraldines	Released: May 9, 2014; Label: Mercury Classics	7	58	17	23	26	61	15	10	20	13	US: 20,000	
Native Invader	Released: September 8, 2017; Label: Decca	39	113	21	19	—	71	18	20	23	16	US: 11,392	
Ocean to Ocean	Released: October 29, 2021; Label: Decca	104	46	23	54	—	200	26	44	15	25	US: 10,000	
The Music of Tori and the Muses	Released: February 28, 2025; Label: Universal	—	—	—	—	—	—	—	—	—	—		
In Times of Dragons	Released: May 1, 2026; Label: Universal	—	56	14	15	—	168	6	36	10	13		
"—" denotes a recording that did not chart or was not released in that territory.

==== As Y Kant Tori Read ====
List of albums, with selected chart positions
Title	Album details	Sales
Y Kant Tori Read	Released: 1988; Label: Atlantic	WW: 7,000

=== Compilations ===
Title	Album details	Peak chart positions				Sales	Certifications
Title	Album details	US	AUS	CAN	UK	Sales	Certifications
More Pink: The B-Sides	Released: November 14, 1994; Label: Atlantic, East West	—	44	—	—		
Tales of a Librarian	Released: November 17, 2003; Label: Atlantic	40	93	86	74	US: 239,000	ARIA: Gold; BPI: Silver
A Piano: The Collection	Released: September 26, 2006; Label: Rhino	—	—	—	—	US: 26,000	
Little Earthquakes – The B-Sides	Released: April 22, 2023; Label: Atlantic	173	—	—	—		
"—" denotes a recording that did not chart or was not released in that territory.

=== Live albums ===
Title	Album details	Peak chart positions				Sales	Certifications
Title	Album details	US	AUS	CAN	UK	Sales	Certifications
To Venus and Back	Released: September 20, 1999; Label: Atlantic	12	6	18	22	US: 458,000	RIAA: Platinum
Live at Montreux 1991/1992	Released: September 22, 2008; Label: Eagle	—	—	—	—		
Diving Deep Live	Released: December 6, 2024; Label: Decca	—	—	—	—		
"—" denotes a recording that did not chart or was not released in that territory.

=== Official bootlegs ===
Title	Album details	Sales
The Original Bootlegs	Released: August 30, 2005 – December 6, 2005; Label: Epic, Sony BMG	US: 6,000
Legs and Boots	Released: October 13, 2007 – December 12, 2007; Label: Epic, Sony BMG	
From Russia with Love	Released: December 3, 2010; Label: toriamos.com	

== Extended plays ==
Although all of Amos' singles released by Atlantic were in an EP-style format, only two of her releases are labeled as such. To date, Scarlet's Hidden Treasures and Christmastide are Amos' only EPs completely comprising non-LP tracks.

Title	Details	Peak chart positions	Sales
Title	Details	US	Sales
Crucify	Released: May 12, 1992; Label: Atlantic, East West	—	US: 420,000
Hey Jupiter	Released: August 20, 1996; Label: Atlantic, East West	94	US: 172,000
Scarlet's Hidden Treasures	Released: May 18, 2004; Label: Epic, Sony BMG	—	
Exclusive Session	Released: June 7, 2005; Label: Epic, Sony BMG	—	
Flavor (Peter Rauhofer Mixes)	Released: December 4, 2012; Label: Deutsche Grammophon	—	
Christmastide	Released: December 4, 2020; Label: Decca	— (Note: "Christmastide" did not enter the Billboard 200, but peaked at number 79 on the Current Album Sales chart.)	
"—" denotes a recording that did not chart or was not released in that territory.

== Singles ==
List of singles, with selected chart positions
Title	Year	Peak chart positions										Certifications	Album
Title	Year	US	US Alt	US Adult	US AAA	US Dance	AUS	CAN	FRA	IRE	UK	Certifications	Album
"Baltimore"	1980	—	—	—	—	—	—	—	—	—	—		Non-album single
"Me and a Gun"	1991	—	—	—	—	—	—	—	—	—	—		Little Earthquakes
"Silent All These Years"	1991	—	27	—	—	—	128	—	—	—	51		Little Earthquakes
"China"	1992	—	—	—	—	—	—	—	—	—	51		Little Earthquakes
"Winter"	1992	—	—	—	—	—	49	—	—	—	25		Little Earthquakes
"Crucify"	1992	—	22	—	—	—	83	74	17	25	15		Little Earthquakes
"Silent All These Years" (UK reissue)	1992	—	—	—	—	—	—	—	—	—	26		Little Earthquakes
"Cornflake Girl"	1994	— (Note: "Cornflake Girl" did not enter the Billboard Hot 100, but peaked at number seven on the Bubbling Under Hot 100 Singles chart.)	12	—	—	—	19	30	—	9	4	BPI: Silver	Under the Pink
"God"	1994	72	1	—	—	—	65	87	—	—	44		Under the Pink
"Pretty Good Year"	1994	—	—	—	—	—	85	—	—	26	7		Under the Pink
"Past the Mission"	1994	—	—	—	—	—	116	—	—	25	31		Under the Pink
"Caught a Lite Sneeze"	1996	60	13	—	3	—	51	20	—	21	20		Boys for Pele
"Talula"	1996	— (Note: "Talula" did not enter the Billboard Hot 100, but peaked at number 19 on the Bubbling Under Hot 100 Singles chart.)	—	—	—	—	131	—	—	—	22		Boys for Pele
"Professional Widow"	1996	— (Note: "Professional Widow" did not enter the Billboard Hot 100, but peaked at number eight on the Bubbling Under Hot 100 Singles chart.)	—	—	—	1	—	38	—	—	—	BPI: Silver	Boys for Pele
"Hey Jupiter" / "Professional Widow"	1996	—	—	—	—	—	17 (Note: The "Hey Jupiter/Professional Widow" and "Professional Widow (It's Got to Be Big)" singles were counted as the same release on the Australian (ARIA) chart.)	—	—	—	20		Boys for Pele
"In the Springtime of His Voodoo"	1996	— (Note: "In the Springtime of His Voodoo" did not enter the Billboard Hot 100, but peaked at number 20 on the Bubbling Under Hot 100 Singles chart.)	—	—	—	6	—	—	—	—	—		Boys for Pele
"Professional Widow (It's Got to Be Big)"	1996	—	—	—	—	—	17	—	35	2	1	ARIA: Gold; BPI: Silver	Boys for Pele
"Silent All These Years" (re-issue, from "The Benefit For RAINN")	1997	65	—	26	—	—	—	—	—	—	—		Little Earthquakes
"Spark"	1998	49	13	32	13	—	50	25	—	—	16		From the Choirgirl Hotel
"Raspberry Swirl"	1998	—	—	—	—	—	57	20	—	—	—		From the Choirgirl Hotel
"Jackie's Strength"	1998	54	—	—	—	—	—	12	—	—	—		From the Choirgirl Hotel
"Cruel" / "Raspberry Swirl"	1998	— (Note: "Cruel" / "Raspberry Swirl" did not enter the Billboard Hot 100, but peaked at number 38 on the Hot 100 Singles Sales chart.)	—	—	—	—	—	—	—	—	—		From the Choirgirl Hotel
"Jackie's Strength" (remixes)	1999	—	—	—	—	1	—	—	—	—	—		From the Choirgirl Hotel
"Bliss"	1999	91	—	—	—	—	—	7	—	—	—		To Venus and Back
"1000 Oceans"	1999	— (Note: "1000 Oceans" did not enter the Billboard Hot 100, but peaked at number 22 on the Hot 100 Singles Sales chart.)	—	—	—	—	145	—	—	—	—		To Venus and Back
"Glory of the 80's"	1999	—	—	—	—	—	81	—	—	—	46		To Venus and Back
"Concertina"	2000	— (Note: "Concertina" did not enter the Billboard Hot 100, but peaked at number 48 on the Hot 100 Singles Sales chart.)	—	—	—	—	—	—	—	—	—		To Venus and Back
"Strange Little Girl"	2001	—	—	—	—	—	—	—	—	—	—		Strange Little Girls
"A Sorta Fairytale"	2002	— (Note: "A Sorta Fairytale" did not enter the Billboard Hot 100, but peaked at number 14 on the Bubbling Under Hot 100 Singles chart.)	—	11	2	—	—	6	—	—	41		Scarlet's Walk
"Taxi Ride"	2003	—	—	35	20	—	—	—	—	—	—		Scarlet's Walk
"Strange"	2003	—	—	—	—	—	—	—	—	—	—		Scarlet's Walk
"Don't Make Me Come to Vegas" (12" only)	2003	—	—	—	—	6	—	—	—	—	—		Scarlet's Walk
"Mary"	2003	—	—	—	—	—	—	—	—	—	—		Tales of a Librarian
"Angels"	2003	—	—	—	—	—	—	—	—	—	—		Tales of a Librarian
"Sleeps with Butterflies"	2005	—	—	—	4	—	—	—	—	—	—		The Beekeeper
"Sweet the Sting"	2005	—	—	—	30	—	—	—	—	—	—		The Beekeeper
"Cars and Guitars"	2005	—	—	—	—	—	—	—	—	—	—		The Beekeeper
"Big Wheel"	2007	— (Note: "Big Wheel" did not enter the Billboard Hot 100, but peaked at number 12 on the Bubbling Under Hot 100 Singles chart.)	—	—	6	—	—	—	—	—	—		American Doll Posse
"Bouncing off Clouds"	2007	—	—	—	—	—	—	—	—	—	—		American Doll Posse
"Almost Rosey"	2007	—	—	—	—	—	—	—	—	—	—		American Doll Posse
"Welcome to England"	2009	—	—	—	10	—	—	—	—	—	—		Abnormally Attracted to Sin
"Maybe California"	2009	—	—	—	—	—	—	—	—	—	—		Abnormally Attracted to Sin
"500 Miles"	2009	—	—	—	—	—	—	—	—	—	—		Abnormally Attracted to Sin
"A Silent Night with You"	2009	—	—	—	—	—	—	—	—	—	—		Midwinter Graces
"Carry"	2011	—	—	—	—	—	—	—	—	—	—		Night of Hunters
"Flavor"	2012	—	—	—	—	1	—	—	—	—	—		Gold Dust
"Trouble's Lament"	2014	—	—	—	—	—	—	—	—	—	—		Unrepentant Geraldines
"Cloud Riders"	2017	—	—	—	—	—	—	—	—	—	—		Native Invader
"Up the Creek"	2017	—	—	—	—	—	—	—	—	—	—		Native Invader
"Reindeer King"	2017	—	—	—	—	—	—	—	—	—	—		Native Invader
"Better Angels"	2020	—	—	—	—	—	—	—	—	—	—		Christmastide
"Speaking with Trees"	2021	—	—	—	—	—	—	—	—	—	—		Ocean to Ocean
"Spies"	2021	—	—	—	—	—	—	—	—	—	—		Ocean to Ocean
"Tequila" (Paul Woolford Remix)	2023	—	—	—	—	—	—	—	—	—	—		Non-album single
"Stronger Together"	2026	—	—	—	—	—	—	—	—	—	—		In Times of Dragons
"Shush"	2026	—	—	—	—	—	—	—	—	—	—		In Times of Dragons
"Gasoline Girls"	2026	—	—	—	—	—	—	—	—	—	—		In Times of Dragons
"—" denotes a recording that did not chart or was not released in that territory.

== B-sides ==
Early in her career Amos released many CD singles in conjunction with her albums—so many that a book called Tori Amos Collectibles was published in 1997 cataloging her worldwide releases, test pressings and bootlegs to that date. One of Amos' best selling early releases is the five-track Crucify EP. Amos' penchant for including non-album B-sides on each of her singles was a major factor in her initial popularity, particularly her cover of the Nirvana song "Smells Like Teen Spirit" from the aforementioned EP, which garnered significant press attention and critical praise. Many of Amos' B-sides are featured on the box set A Piano: The Collection (2006). With the production of CD singles becoming less common in the music business around the turn of the century, Amos has released far fewer B-sides since her contract with Epic Records began. As a result, B-sides for Scarlet's Walk were released through the internet and on an EP titled Scarlet's Hidden Treasures (2004), the sole B-side for The Beekeeper was released as on the DVD included in the album's limited-edition version, and B-sides for American Doll Posse were distributed depending on packaging and place of purchase.

Below is an alphabetical list of all of Amos' known B-sides, including information on initial and subsequent releases.

Title	Initial release	Subsequent release(s)	Release date(s)
"After All"	"Strange Little Girl" single	Strange Little Girls expanded edition	2001, 2026
"Alamo"	"Talula" single	Boys for Pele deluxe remaster	1996, 2016
"All the Girls Hate Her"	"Cornflake Girl" single	"God" single, Under the Pink deluxe remaster	1994, 2015
"Amazing Grace"/"'Til the Chicken"	"Talula" single	Boys for Pele deluxe remaster	1996, 2016
"Angie"	"Winter" single	Crucify EP	1992
"Apollo's Frock"	Scarlet's Hidden Treasures EP	—	2004
"Bachelorette"	"Spark" single	A Piano: The Collection	1998, 2006
"Beulah Land"	"Jackie's Strength" single	A Piano	1998, 2006
"Black Swan"	"Pretty Good Year" single	A Piano, Under the Pink deluxe remaster	1994, 2006, 2015
"Bug a Martini"	Scarlet's Hidden Treasures EP	—	2004
"A Case of You"	"Cornflake Girl" UK single	More Pink: The B-Sides	1994
"Cooling"	"Spark" single	A Piano	1998, 2006
"Daisy Dead Petals"	"Pretty Good Year" single	"Cornflake Girl" single, More Pink, A Piano, Under the Pink deluxe remaster	1994, 2006, 2015
"Do It Again"	"Spark" single	—	1998
"Dolphin Song"	A Piano	—	2006
"Drive All Night"	digital download	"Big Wheel" digital single	2007
"Flying Dutchman"	"China" single	A Piano, Gold Dust, Little Earthquakes deluxe remaster	1992, 2006, 2012, 2015
"Fire Eater's Wife" / "Beauty Queen (Demo)"	A Piano: The Collection	Boys for Pele deluxe remaster	2006, 2016
"Frog on My Toe"	"Talula" single	A Piano, Boys for Pele deluxe remaster	1996, 2006, 2016
"Garlands"	The Beekeeper DVD	—	2005
"Graveyard"	"Caught a Lite Sneeze" single	Boys for Pele deluxe remaster	1996, 2016
"Growing Up"	Strange Little Girls expanded edition	—	2026
"Have Yourself a Merry Little Christmas"	"Spark" single	—	1998
"Here. In My Head"	"Crucify" single	More Pink: The B-Sides, A Piano, Little Earthquakes deluxe remaster	1992, 1994, 2006, 2015
"Home on the Range (Cherokee Edition)"	"God" single	"Pretty Good Year" single, A Piano, Under the Pink deluxe remaster	1994, 2006, 2015
"Honey"	"Pretty Good Year" single	"Cornflake Girl" single, More Pink, A Piano, Under the Pink deluxe remaster	1994, 2006, 2015
"Hoover Factory"	Strange Little Girls expanded edition	—	2026
"Humpty Dumpty"	"China" single	Little Earthquakes deluxe remaster	1992, 2015
"Hungarian Wedding Song"	"Caught a Lite Sneeze" single	A Piano, Boys for Pele deluxe remaster	1996, 2006, 2016
"If 6 Was 9"	"Cornflake Girl" UK single	—	1994
"I'm on Fire"	VH1 Crossroads	—	1996
"Indian Summer"	Scarlet's Hidden Treasures EP	—	2004
"Landslide"	Y-100 Sonic Sessions Volume 1	—	1997
"Little Drummer Boy"	More Pink: The B-Sides	—	1994
"London Girls"	"Talula" single	Boys for Pele deluxe remaster	1996, 2016
"Mary"	"Crucify" single	Tales of a Librarian, A Piano, Little Earthquakes deluxe remaster	1992, 2003, 2006, 2015
"Merman"	digital download	No Boundaries compilation, A Piano	1998, 1999, 2006
"Miracle"	American Doll Posse iTunes edition	—	2007
"Mountain"	unreleased (streamed on Scarlet's Web)	Scarlet's Hidden Treasures 2023 remaster	2002, 2023
"My Posse Can Do"	American Doll Posse DVD	—	2007
"Never Seen Blue"	"Jackie's Strength" single	A Piano	1998, 2006
"Not David Bowie"	A Piano: The Collection	—	2006
"Ode to My Clothes"	A Piano: The Collection	—	2006
"Ode to the Banana King"	"Silent All These Years" single	Little Earthquakes deluxe remaster	1992, 2015
"Only Women Bleed"	"Strange Little Girl" single	Strange Little Girls expanded edition	2001, 2026
"Operation Peter Pan"	"A Sorta Fairytale" single	Scarlet's Hidden Treasures 2023 remaster	2002, 2023
"Over It"	"Cornflake Girl" single	"God" single, Under the Pink deluxe remaster	1994, 2015
"Over the Rainbow" (live)	Hey Jupiter EP	—	1996
"Peeping Tommi"	A Piano: The Collection	—	2006
"The Pool"	"Winter" single	A Piano: The Collection, Little Earthquakes deluxe remaster	1992, 2006, 2015
"Purple People"	"Spark" single	From the Choirgirl Hotel Japanese edition	1998
"Ruby Through the Looking Glass"	Scarlet's Hidden Treasures EP	—	2004
"Samurai"	"Caught a Lite Sneeze" single	"Talula" single	1996
"Seaside"	Scarlet's Hidden Treasures EP	—	2004
"Sister Janet"	"Cornflake Girl" single	More Pink: The B-Sides, A Piano, Under the Pink Deluxe Remaster	1994, 2006, 2015
"Sister Named Desire"	"Talula" single	Boys for Pele deluxe remaster	1996, 2016
"Smells Like Teen Spirit"	"Winter" single	Crucify EP, Little Earthquakes deluxe remaster	1992, 2015
"Song for Eric"	"Silent All These Years" single	Little Earthquakes deluxe remaster	1992, 2015
"Strange Fruit"	"Cornflake Girl" UK single	—	1994
"Sucker"	Boys for Pele deluxe remaster	—	2016
"Sugar"	"China" single	More Pink, A Piano, Little Earthquakes deluxe remaster	1992, 1994, 2006, 2015
"Sweet Dreams"	"Winter" single	Tales of a Librarian, A Piano, Little Earthquakes deluxe remaster	1992, 2003, 2006, 2015
"Take Me with You"	A Piano: The Collection	Little Earthquakes deluxe remaster	2006, 2015
"Take to the Sky"	"Winter" single	More Pink, A Piano, Little Earthquakes deluxe remaster	1992, 1994, 2006, 2015
"Thank You"	"Winter" single	Crucify EP	1992
"That's What I Like Mick (The Sandwich Song)"	"Caught a Lite Sneeze" single	Boys for Pele deluxe remaster	1996, 2016
"This Old Man"	"Caught a Lite Sneeze" single	Boys for Pele deluxe remaster	1996, 2016
"Thoughts"	"Me and a Gun" single	"Silent All These Years" single, Little Earthquakes deluxe remaster	1991, 2015
"To the Fair Motormaids of Japan"	Boys for Pele deluxe remaster	—	2016
"Tombigbee"	Scarlet's Hidden Treasures EP	—	2004
"Toodles Mr. Jim"	"Caught a Lite Sneeze" single	Boys for Pele Japanese edition, Boys for Pele deluxe remaster	1996, 2016
"Upside Down"	"Me and a Gun" single	"Silent All These Years" single, "Winter" single, More Pink, A Piano, Little Earthquakes deluxe remaster	1991, 1994, 2006, 2015
"Walk to Dublin (Sucker Reprise)"	A Piano: The Collection	Boys for Pele deluxe remaster	2006, 2016
"Zero Point"	A Piano: The Collection	—	2006

== Video albums ==
Year	Video	Chart peaks		Certifications (sales thresholds)
Year	Video	Dutch DVD	UK Music Video	Certifications (sales thresholds)
1992	Little Earthquakes: Released: October 1992; Label: Warner Music Vision; Format: VHS	—	10	US: Gold
1998	Live from New York: Released: 1997; Label: Warner Music Vision; Format: VHS	—	24	
1998	Complete Videos 1991–1998: Released: November 17, 1998; Label: Warner Music Vision; Format: VHS	—	6	US: Gold
2003	A Sorta Fairytale: Released: April 8, 2003; Label: Sony Music Enterprises; Format: DVD (jewel or DVD case)	—	—	
2004	Welcome to Sunny Florida: Released: May 18, 2004; Label: Sony Music Enterprises; Format: DVD/CD (jewel or DVD case)	17	1	US: Gold
2006	Fade to Red: Released: February 14, 2006; Label: Rhino Entertainment; Format: DVD	—	5	
2008	Live at Montreux 1991/1992: Released: September 22, 2008; Label: Eagle Vision; Format: DVD, Blu-ray	23	21	
2010	Live from the Artists Den: Released: July 13, 2010; Label: Artists Den; Format: DVD	—	—	

== Music videos ==
Year	Song	Album	Director(s)
1991	"Silent All These Years"	Little Earthquakes	Cindy Palmano
1992	"China"	Little Earthquakes	Cindy Palmano
1992	"Winter"	Little Earthquakes	Cindy Palmano
1992	"Crucify"	Little Earthquakes	Cindy Palmano
1994	"Cornflake Girl" (UK version)	Under the Pink	Big TV!
1994	"God"	Under the Pink	Melodie McDaniel
1994	"Pretty Good Year"	Under the Pink	Cindy Palmano & Sam Riley
1994	"Cornflake Girl" (US version)	Under the Pink	Tori Amos & Nancy Bennett
1994	"Past the Mission"	Under the Pink	Jake Scott
1996	"Caught a Lite Sneeze"	Boys for Pele	Mike Lipscombe
1996	"Talula"	Boys for Pele	Mark Kohr
1996	"Hey Jupiter"	Boys for Pele	Earle Sebastian
1996	"Professional Widow"	Boys for Pele	Unknown
1998	"Spark"	From the Choirgirl Hotel	James Brown
1998	"Jackie's Strength"	From the Choirgirl Hotel	James Brown
1998	"Raspberry Swirl"	From the Choirgirl Hotel	Barnaby & Scott
1999	"Bliss"	To Venus and Back	Loren Haynes
1999	"1000 Oceans"	To Venus and Back	Erick Ifergan
1999	"Glory of the 80's"∞	To Venus and Back	Erick Ifergan
2001	"Strange Little Girl"∞	Strange Little Girls	David Slade
2002	"A Sorta Fairytale"	Scarlet's Walk	Sanji
2002	"Gold Dust"	Scarlet's Walk	
2003	"Mary"∞	Tales of a Librarian	Unknown
2005	"Sleeps with Butterflies"	The Beekeeper	Laurent Briet
2005	"Sweet the Sting"	The Beekeeper	Alex Smith
2007	"Big Wheel"∞	American Doll Posse	Tori Amos & Blaise Reutersward
2007	"Bouncing off Clouds"∞	American Doll Posse	Tori Amos & Blaise Reutersward
2007	"Almost Rosey"∞	American Doll Posse	Unknown
2009	"That Guy"	Abnormally Attracted to Sin	Christian Lamb
2009	"Welcome to England"	Abnormally Attracted to Sin	Christian Lamb
2009	"Strong Black Vine"	Abnormally Attracted to Sin	Christian Lamb
2009	"Ophelia"	Abnormally Attracted to Sin	Christian Lamb
2009	"Fast Horse"	Abnormally Attracted to Sin	Christian Lamb
2009	"Fire to Your Plain"	Abnormally Attracted to Sin	Christian Lamb
2009	"Curtain Call"	Abnormally Attracted to Sin	Christian Lamb
2009	"Not Dying Today"	Abnormally Attracted to Sin	Christian Lamb
2009	"Maybe California"	Abnormally Attracted to Sin	Christian Lamb
2009	"Give"	Abnormally Attracted to Sin	Christian Lamb
2009	"Police Me"	Abnormally Attracted to Sin	Christian Lamb
2009	"Starling"	Abnormally Attracted to Sin	Christian Lamb
2009	"500 Miles"	Abnormally Attracted to Sin	Christian Lamb
2009	"Flavor"	Abnormally Attracted to Sin	Christian Lamb
2009	"Lady in Blue"	Abnormally Attracted to Sin	Christian Lamb
2009	"Abnormally Attracted to Sin"	Abnormally Attracted to Sin	Christian Lamb
2009	"A Silent Night with You"∞	Midwinter Graces	
2011	"Carry"	Night of Hunters	Bruno Centofani & Victor de Mello
2011	"Nautical Twilight"	Night of Hunters	Bruno Centofani & Victor de Mello
2011	"Star Whisperer"∞	Night of Hunters	Bruno Centofani & Victor de Mello
2012	"Flavor" (Gold Dust version)	Gold Dust	Danielle Levitt
2012	"Gold Dust" (Gold Dust version)	Gold Dust	Holger Hage
2014	"Trouble's Lament" (Lyric Video)∞	Unrepentant Geraldines	
2014	"Trouble's Lament"∞	Unrepentant Geraldines	Beau Fowler
2014	"Promise"∞	Unrepentant Geraldines	Beau Fowler
2017	"Cloud Riders" (Lyric Video)∞	Native Invader	
2017	"Up the Creek" (Lyric Video)∞	Native Invader	
2017	"Reindeer King" (Lyric Video)∞	Native Invader	
2020	"Better Angels" (Lyric Video)∞	Christmastide	
2021	"Spies" (Lyric Video)∞	Ocean to Ocean	
2023	"Tequila" (Paul Woolford Remix)∞	Tequila (Paul Woolford Remix)	
∞ denotes videos released as promotional only, not commercially released.

== Musical contributions ==
=== Soundtracks and cast recordings ===
Year	Contributed track(s)	Film/musical/series
1992	"The Happy Worker", "Workers"	Toys
1995	"Losing My Religion", "Butterfly"	Higher Learning
1995	"It Might Hurt a Bit"°	Don Juan DeMarco
1996	"Talula (The Tornado Mix)"	Twister
1996	"Professional Widow"	Escape from L.A.
1998	"Finn", "Siren", "Paradiso Perduto"	Great Expectations
1999	"Me & You"‡	Hand of Fate
2000	"Carnival"	Mission: Impossible 2
2000	"1000 Oceans"	Here on Earth
2003	"You Belong to Me", "Murder, He Says"	Mona Lisa Smile
2006	"Northern Lad"	Snow Cake
2008	"Yo George"	Body of War
2015	"Highness in the Sky", "Darkest Hour"	The Light Princess (Original Cast Recording)
2016	"Flicker"	Audrie & Daisy
2019	"A Nightingale Sang in Berkeley Square"	Good Omens
° Duet with Michael Stipe of R.E.M., track unreleased ‡ Film and soundtrack unreleased

=== Tributes ===
Year	Contributed track(s)	Album
1995	"Famous Blue Raincoat"	Tower of Song: The Songs of Leonard Cohen
1995	"Down by the Seaside"°	Encomium: A Tribute to Led Zeppelin
° Duet with Robert Plant

=== Other contributions ===
Year	Song	Album
1992	"Little Drummer Boy"	We've Got Your Yule Logs Hangin Compilation/You Sleigh Me!
1992	"Sarah Cynthia Sylvia Stout"	Speaking Of Christmas And Other Things Compilation
1992	"Ring My Bell"	Ruby Trax Compilation
1994	"Silent All These Years"	Rare on Air, Volume 1 – Compilation of Live Performances on KCRW
1996	"I'm on Fire"	VH1 Crossroads
1997	"Landslide"	Y-100 Sonic Sessions Volume 1
1998	"Spark"	MTV Fantastic Females Volume 1
1999	"Merman"	No Boundaries: A Benefit for the Kosovar Refugees
2023	"Swimming Pools (Drank)"	Echoes: Ancient & Modern (Trevor Horn)

=== Side projects ===
Year	Album	Artist	Contribution
1987	Without You I'm Nothing	Sandra Bernhard	Backing vocals on "Little Red Corvette"
1988	Last Days of the Century	Al Stewart	Backing vocals on "Red Toupee" and "Last Day of the Century"
1989	Mosquitos	Stan Ridgway	Backing vocals
1990	Phantom Center	Ferron	Backing vocals
1994	The Lead and How to Swing It	Tom Jones	Backing vocals on "I Wanna Get Back with You"
1996	Ima	BT	Vocals on "Blue Skies"‡
2010	Here Lies Love	David Byrne & Fatboy Slim	Vocals on "You'll Be Taken Care Of" and "Why Don't You Love Me?"°
2013	They Die by Dawn & Other Short Stories...	The Bullitts	Vocals and piano on "Wait Until Tomorrow"
2015	Blackbird – The Beatles Album	Miloš Karadaglić	Vocals on "She's Leaving Home"
‡ Single peaked at No. 1 on Billboard Dance/Club Play chart. ° Duet with Cyndi Lauper

== See also ==
- List of songs recorded by Tori Amos
