= A Piano: The Collection =

Box set by Tori Amos
- Released: September 26, 2006
- Recorded: 1990 – March 2006
- Label: Rhino
- Producer: Tori Amos

Tori Amos chronology
The Beekeeper (2005)	A Piano: The Collection (2006)	American Doll Posse (2007)

A Piano: The Collection is a five-disc box set spanning the first 15 years of the solo career of American singer-songwriter and pianist Tori Amos. Released on September 26, 2006, by Rhino Records as part of the contract Amos negotiated with Warner Music Group, the set includes singles, album tracks, B-sides, rarities, demos, and unreleased songs from album sessions.

== Contents ==
The compilation's first disc is an "extended" version of Amos's 1992 debut, Little Earthquakes. This version has a different song sequence and alternate mixes, as well as four B-sides ("Upside Down" and "Sweet Dreams", and alternate mixes of "Flying Dutchman" and "Take to the Sky") and the previously unreleased, unedited single remix version of "Crucify".

The second disc includes songs from Under the Pink (1994) and Boys for Pele (1996). The tracks consist of original and remixed versions of albums cuts, the B-side "Honey", and a live performance of "Professional Widow". Also included is "Take Me with You" (music recorded in 1990, with lyrics and vocals finished in 2006). The third disc also includes songs associated with Boys for Pele, as well as 1999's To Venus and Back, and one song from 2003's Tales of a Librarian: A Tori Amos Collection.

The fourth disc contains original and remixed versions of songs from From the Choirgirl Hotel (1998), Scarlet's Walk (2002) and The Beekeeper (2005). Also included are the previously unheard intro to "Marys of the Sea" (from The Beekeeper) and four previously unreleased songs: "Not David Bowie" (recorded in 2004 for The Beekeeper), "Ode to My Clothes" (recorded in 2001 in between takes for Strange Little Girls), "Dolphin Song" (recorded in 2003), and "Zero Point" (recorded in 1999 for To Venus and Back), which Amos had mentioned in interviews as well as the liner notes to 1999's To Venus and Back. Amos wrote of "Dolphin Song":

"Some songs seem to have a timeline for when they want to be finished and put out to the world. At the time when we were working on 'Dolphin Song', I had all kinds of ideas for her development after the basic tracking had been done. Instead she got set aside for a while. But once we started to go through the tape library we put 'Dolphin' up on the faders again, and I realized we didn't need to record anything else; it was finished."

The final disc includes 16 B-sides from throughout Amos' career to that point, as well as "Merman" (originally a digital download included with pre-orders of From the Choirgirl Hotel, but later included on the 1999 compilation No Boundaries: A Benefit for the Kosovar Refugees), and one previously unreleased song: "Peeping Tommi", recorded in 1993 for Under the Pink. Finally, the disc included a medley of demos for the songs "Fire-Eater’s Wife / Beauty Queen", "Playboy Mommy", and "A Sorta Fairytale". Amos explained:

"I’m usually pretty reticent to expose the musical development process... The demo medley was a choice I made so that other songwriters can feel an affinity with the idea that songwriters have to push themselves and not just accept the first incarnation that you are presented with. Each of these three songs are presented here in their completed form somewhere within the box set so you can see conception to development."

== Track listing ==
=== Disc A (440 Hz): Little Earthquakes Extended ===
All tracks are written by Tori Amos.

No.	Title	Album/Single	Length
1.	"Leather" (Alternate Mix)	Little Earthquakes (Previously unreleased version)	3:12
2.	"Precious Things" (Alternate Mix)	Little Earthquakes (Previously unreleased version)	4:30
3.	"Silent All These Years" (Remastered)	Little Earthquakes	4:12
4.	"Upside Down" (Remastered)	"Silent All These Years" (UK) / "Winter" (US)	4:22
5.	"Crucify" (Unedited Single Version)	Little Earthquakes (Previously unreleased version)	4:27
6.	"Happy Phantom" (Remastered)	Little Earthquakes	3:15
7.	"Me and a Gun" (Remastered)	Little Earthquakes	3:43
8.	"Flying Dutchman" (Alternate Mix)	"China" (Previously unreleased version)	6:29
9.	"Girl" (Remastered)	Little Earthquakes	4:08
10.	"Winter" (Remastered)	Little Earthquakes	5:43
11.	"Take to the Sky (Russia)" (Alternate Mix)	"Winter" (Previously unreleased version)	4:18
12.	"Tear in Your Hand" (Remastered)	Little Earthquakes	4:42
13.	"China" (Remastered)	Little Earthquakes	4:59
14.	"Sweet Dreams" (Remastered)	"Winter"	3:28
15.	"Mother" (Alternate Mix)	Little Earthquakes (Previously unreleased version)	7:01
16.	"Little Earthquakes" (Remastered)	Little Earthquakes	6:54

=== Disc B (493.88 Hz): Pink and Pele ===
All tracks are written by Tori Amos.

No.	Title	Album/Single	Length
1.	"Cornflake Girl" (Remastered)	Under the Pink	5:06
2.	"Honey" (Remastered)	"Pretty Good Year" (UK) / "Cornflake Girl" (US)	3:42
3.	"Take Me with You"	Previously unreleased	4:40
4.	"Baker Baker" (Alternate Mix)	Under the Pink (Previously unreleased version)	3:25
5.	"The Waitress" (Alternate Mix)	Under the Pink (Previously unreleased version)	3:07
6.	"Pretty Good Year" (Remastered)	Under the Pink	3:20
7.	"God" (Remastered)	Under the Pink	3:54
8.	"Cloud on My Tongue" (Remastered)	Under the Pink	4:36
9.	"Past the Mission" (Alternate Mix)	Under the Pink (Previously unreleased version)	4:06
10.	"Bells for Her" (Remastered)	Under the Pink	5:17
11.	"Yes, Anastasia" (Alternate Mix)	Under the Pink (Previously unreleased version)	9:21
12.	"Blood Roses" (Remastered)	Boys for Pele	3:55
13.	"Mr. Zebra" (Remastered)	Boys for Pele	1:05
14.	"Caught a Lite Sneeze" (Alternate Mix)	Boys for Pele (Previously unreleased version)	4:24
15.	"Professional Widow" (Merry Widow Version - Live - Remastered)	"Hey Jupiter" (Album version on Boys for Pele)	4:03
16.	"Beauty Queen/Horses" (Remastered)	Boys for Pele	5:56
17.	"Father Lucifer" (Remastered)	Boys for Pele	3:40
18.	"Marianne" (Remastered)	Boys for Pele	4:09

=== Disc C (523.25 Hz): Pele, Venus, and Tales ===
All tracks are written by Tori Amos.

No.	Title	Album/Single	Length
1.	"Walk to Dublin (Sucker Reprise)"	Previously unreleased	5:25
2.	"Hey Jupiter" (Dakota Version - Remastered)	"Hey Jupiter" (Album version on Boys for Pele)	6:03
3.	"Professional Widow" (Armand's Star Trunk Funkin' Mix - Radio Edit - Remastered)	"Professional Widow" (Album version on Boys for Pele)	3:47
4.	"Putting the Damage On" (Remastered)	Boys for Pele	5:07
5.	"Bliss" (Remixed Version)	To Venus and Back (Remixed version from Tales of a Librarian)	3:41
6.	"Suede" (Remastered)	To Venus and Back	4:58
7.	"Glory of the 80s" (Remastered)	To Venus and Back	4:05
8.	"1000 Oceans" (Remastered)	To Venus and Back	4:18
9.	"Concertina" (Single Remix Version)	"Concertina" (Album version on To Venus and Back)	3:57
10.	"Lust" (Remastered)	To Venus and Back	3:51
11.	"Datura" (Remastered)	To Venus and Back	8:26
12.	"Sugar" (Live from Soundcheck - Remastered)	To Venus and Back	5:10
13.	"The Waitress" (Live - Remastered)	To Venus and Back	9:49
14.	"Snow Cherries from France" (Remastered)	Tales of a Librarian	2:55
15.	"Doughnut Song" (Remixed Version)	Boys for Pele (Remixed version previously used during credits of Fade to Red)	4:21

=== Disc D (587.33 Hz): Scarlet, Beekeeper, and Choirgirl ===
All tracks are written by Tori Amos.

No.	Title	Album/Single	Length
1.	"A Sorta Fairytale" (Remastered)	Scarlet's Walk	5:30
2.	"Not David Bowie"	Previously unreleased	3:55
3.	"Amber Waves" (Remastered)	Scarlet's Walk	3:40
4.	"iieee" (Remixed Version)	From the Choirgirl Hotel (Previously unreleased version)	4:09
5.	"Playboy Mommy" (Remixed Version)	From the Choirgirl Hotel (Remixed version from Tales of a Librarian)	4:07
6.	"The Beekeeper" (Remastered)	The Beekeeper	6:51
7.	"Jackie's Strength" (Remixed Version)	From the Choirgirl Hotel (Remixed version from Tales of a Librarian)	4:26
8.	"Zero Point"	Previously unreleased	8:55
9.	"Sweet the Sting" (Remastered)	The Beekeeper	4:17
10.	"Ode to My Clothes"	Previously unreleased	2:04
11.	"Spark" (Remastered)	From the Choirgirl Hotel	4:14
12.	"Intro Jam and Marys of the Sea"	The Beekeeper (Previously unreleased version)	8:55
13.	"Cruel" (Remixed Version)	From the Choirgirl Hotel (Previously unreleased version)	4:06
14.	"Dolphin Song"	Previously unreleased	5:53
15.	"Gold Dust" (Remastered)	Scarlet's Walk	5:53

=== Disc E (659.26 Hz): Bonus B-Sides ===
All tracks are written by Tori Amos, except tracks 15 & 21 (traditional).

No.	Title	Album/Single	Length
1.	"The Pool" (Remastered)	"Winter"	2:52
2.	"Never Seen Blue" (Remastered)	"Jackie's Strength"	3:38
3.	"Daisy Dead Petals" (Remastered)	"Pretty Good Year" (UK) / "Cornflake Girl" (US)	3:03
4.	"Beulah Land" (Remastered)	"Jackie's Strength"	2:57
5.	"Sugar" (Remastered)	"China"	4:27
6.	"Cooling" (Remastered)	"Spark"	4:39
7.	"Bachelorette" (Remastered)	"Spark"	3:34
8.	"Black Swan" (Remastered)	"Pretty Good Year" (UK) / "Past the Mission" (US)	4:01
9.	"Mary" (Tales Version - Remastered)	Tales of a Librarian	4:42
10.	"Peeping Tommi"	Previously unreleased	4:19
11.	"Toodles Mr. Jim" (Remastered)	"Caught a Lite Sneeze"	2:49
12.	"Fire-Eater's Wife / Beauty Queen" (Demo)	Previously unreleased (Album version on Boys for Pele)	3:11
13.	"Playboy Mommy" (Demo)	Previously unreleased (Album version on From the Choirgirl Hotel)	1:34
14.	"A Sorta Fairytale" (Demo)	Previously unreleased (Album version on Scarlet's Walk)	3:09
15.	"This Old Man" (Remastered)	"Caught a Lite Sneeze"	1:44
16.	"Purple People" (Live from Soundcheck - Remastered)	To Venus and Back (Studio version on "Spark" single)	4:12
17.	"Here. In My Head" (Remastered)	"Crucify"	3:52
18.	"Hungarian Wedding Song" (Remastered)	"Caught a Lite Sneeze"	1:01
19.	"Merman" (Remastered)	From the Choirgirl Hotel (Pre-order bonus download)	3:46
20.	"Sister Janet" (Remastered)	"Cornflake Girl"	4:00
21.	"Home on the Range" (Cherokee Edition - Remastered)	"God" (US) / "Pretty Good Year" (UK)	5:22
22.	"Frog on My Toe" (Remastered)	"Talula"	3:42

== Errors in the printed track listing ==
The track listing incorrectly labels "Purple People" as being the B-side version from the "Spark" single, but the version featured here is the live soundcheck version from To Venus and Back.

Likewise, the version of "Take to the Sky" featured here is a different mix from the one released as a B-side to "Winter". The alternate mix on this compilation is noticeably different in that it does not have backing vocals on the second chorus or during the song's outro.
