= Live at Montreux 1991/1992 =

Live album by Tori Amos
- Released: September 22, 2008
- Recorded: July 3, 1991; July 7, 1992
- Venue: Montreux Casino (Montreux, Switzerland)
- Genre: Piano rock
- Length: 44:06 (1991); 47:54 (1992)
- Label: Eagle Records (CD); Eagle Eye Media (DVD and Blu-ray)

Tori Amos live chronology
Legs and Boots (2007)	Live at Montreux 1991/1992 (2008)

Tori Amos video chronology
Fade to Red (2006)	Live at Montreux 1991/1992 (2008)

Live at Montreux 1991/1992 is a Tori Amos live album and DVD or Blu-ray set, released on September 22, 2008, in the United Kingdom and on September 30, 2008, in the United States, featuring two separate performances at the Montreux Jazz Festival early in her career. The first 10-song set was recorded on July 3, 1991, (opening for the Moody Blues), with the second 9-song set recorded one year later on July 7, 1992. The bulk of the set list for each show was largely taken from Amos' debut solo studio album Little Earthquakes (1992), as well as including some B-sides and cover versions of songs by Led Zeppelin and Nirvana.

Eagle Rock Entertainment, a distributor for many releases of Montreux Jazz Festival performances, released the CD and DVD sets.

== Track listing ==
The complete set lists for the 1991 and 1992 performances are available on the DVD, Blu-ray and the two-disc European/Latin American CD. The single-disc North American CD release features all but three songs from both performances (the exceptions being "Silent All These Years", "Crucify" and "Happy Phantom" from the 1992 show). The three omitted tracks were made available as a digital downloads.

All tracks are written by Tori Amos except where noted.

Disc one (1991)
No.	Title	Writer(s)	Length
1.	"Silent All These Years"		4:14
2.	"Precious Things"		4:29
3.	"China"		5:16
4.	"Crucify"		5:21
5.	"Leather"		3:04
6.	"Song for Eric"		1:19
7.	"Upside Down"		4:33
8.	"Happy Phantom"		3:23
9.	"Winter"		5:28
10.	"Thank You"	Robert Plant, Jimmy Page	3:19

Disc two (1992)
No.	Title	Writer(s)	Length
1.	"Little Earthquakes"		5:43
2.	"Crucify"		5:31
3.	"Silent All These Years"		4:40
4.	"Precious Things"		4:58
5.	"Happy Phantom"		3:07
6.	"Whole Lotta Love"/"Thank You"	Page, Plant, John Bonham, John Paul Jones, Willie Dixon	3:42
7.	"Me and a Gun"		4:50
8.	"Winter"		6:06
9.	"Smells Like Teen Spirit"	Kurt Cobain, Krist Novoselic, Dave Grohl	3:11

== Personnel ==
- Tori Amos – vocals, Yamaha CP80 (1991), Steinway D-274 (1992), executive producer
- Mark Hawley - audio advisor
- Jon Astley – mastering

== Release history ==
While audio bootlegs of these two performances have been circulating for many years, this is the first official release for this pair of early Amos performances. The same footage was released on Blu-ray format in both the United Kingdom and the United States in December 2008. It was released on vinyl as double LP album in the UK and Europe in 2014, and again in Europe in 2019.

Country	Date	Label	Format	Catalogue number(s)
United Kingdom	22 September 2008	Eagle Records	2×CD	EDGCD391
United Kingdom	22 September 2008	Eagle Eye Media	DVD	EREDV711
United Kingdom	1 December 2008	Eagle Eye Media	Blu-ray	EVBRD 33322-9
United States	30 September 2008	Eagle Records	CD	ER 20144-2
United States	30 September 2008	Eagle Records	Digital download	—
United States	30 September 2008	Eagle Eye Media	DVD	EE 39172-9
United States	9 December 2008	Eagle Eye Media	Blu-ray	EVBRD 33322-9
Canada	14 October 2008	Eagle Records	CD	—
Canada	14 October 2008	Eagle Records	Digital download	—
Canada	14 October 2008	Eagle Eye Media	DVD	—
Europe	24 November 2014	Let Them Eat Vinyl	2×LP	LETV334LP
Europe	1 March 2019	Ear Music Classics	2×LP (Red vinyl)	0213876EMX
United States	4 December 2020	Ear Music Classics	2×LP (Red vinyl)	0213876EMX
Europe	15 January 2021	Ear Music Classics	2×CD/Blu-Ray	0214975EMX
Europe	29 October 2021	Ear Music Classics	2×LP	0216863EMX
