= Exclusive Session =

Exclusive Session may refer to:

- Exclusive Session (Placebo EP), 2007
- Exclusive Session (Tori Amos EP), 2005
