= From Russia with Love (Tori Amos album) =

Live album by Tori Amos
- Released: December 3, 2010
- Recorded: September 3, 2010
- Venue: Crocus City Hall (Moscow, Russia)
- Genre: Alternative rock; baroque pop
- Length: 101:01
- Label: toriamos.com
- Producer: Tori Amos

Tori Amos chronology
Midwinter Graces (2009)	From Russia with Love (2010)	Night of Hunters (2011)

From Russia with Love is an exclusive live album by American singer-songwriter and pianist Tori Amos, released on December 3, 2010. The concert was recorded in Moscow on September 3, 2010. The limited edition set included a signature edition Lomography Diana F+ camera, along with 2 lenses, a roll of film and 1 of 5 photographs taken of Tori during her time in Moscow. The set was released exclusively through toriamos.com and only 2000 were produced.

== Track listing ==
All songs written and composed by Amos, except where noted.

Disc one
No.	Title	Length
1.	"Little Earthquakes"	7:18
2.	"Icicle"	4:49
3.	"Beauty of Speed"	5:02
4.	"Lust"	4:07
5.	"Dragon"	5:19
6.	"Josephine"	2:48
7.	"Precious Things"	6:03
8.	"Bells For Her"	6:25
9.	"Star of Wonder" (John Henry Hopkins Jr.)	3:47
10.	"Silent All These Years"	5:17

Disc two
No.	Title	Length
1.	"Take to the Sky / Muhammad My Friend"	5:11
2.	"Mother Revolution"	5:36
3.	"Space Dog"	5:14
4.	"Indian Summer"	5:39
5.	"China"	5:44
6.	"Yes, Anastasia"	5:42
7.	"Winter"	7:39
8.	"Bouncing off Clouds"	5:18
9.	"Leather"	4:04
Total length:		101:01

== Personnel ==
- Tori Amos – vocals, piano, keyboards
