= Welcome to Sunny Florida =

Video by Tori Amos
- Released: May 18, 2004
- Recorded: September 4, 2003
- Venues: Sound Advice Amphitheatre (West Palm Beach, Florida)
- Genres: Rock; pop
- Length: 141:57 (concert including "Past the Mission"); 33:31 (DVD extra features); 33:43 (Scarlet's Hidden Treasures CD)
- Label: Sony Music

Tori Amos chronology
A Sorta Fairytale (2003)	Welcome to Sunny Florida (2004)	Live at Montreux 1991/1992 (2008)

Welcome to Sunny Florida is the name of a DVD and CD set released by American singer-songwriter and pianist Tori Amos in 2004. The set features a live concert performance by Amos from her 2002 " On Scarlet's Walk" tour, in support of her album Scarlet's Walk. It was recorded live at Sound Advice Amphitheatre in West Palm Beach, Florida. The DVD also features photographs and other exclusive material including a full-length interview with Amos. The title is a sarcastic reference to the fact that on September 4, 2003 (the day of filming) there was a rainstorm.

Accompanying the DVD is an EP called Scarlet's Hidden Treasures, which features six non-LP tracks. The DVD/CD was released in either a double CD jewel case, or in a special DVD case.

== DVD ==
Main Set List
No.	Title	Length
1.	"A Sorta Fairytale"
2.	"Sugar"
3.	"Crucify"
4.	"Interlude #1"
5.	"Cornflake Girl"
6.	"Bells for Her"
7.	"Concertina"
8.	"Interlude #2"
9.	"Take to the Sky"
10.	"Leather"
11.	"Cloud on My Tongue"
12.	"Cooling"
13.	"Interlude #3"
14.	"Your Cloud"
15.	"Father Lucifer"
16.	"Professional Widow"
17.	"I Can't See New York"
18.	"Precious Things"

Encore
No.	Title	Length
19.	"Tombigbee" (2nd take)
20.	"Amber Waves"
21.	"Hey Jupiter"

Cut Songs
No.	Title	Length
1.	"Wednesday"
2.	"Tombigbee" (1st take)
3.	"Virginia"
4.	"Sweet Sangria"
5.	"Past the Mission" (Audio featured on DVD photo gallery)

== Scarlet's Hidden Treasures ==
No.	Title	Length
1.	"Ruby Through the Looking-Glass"	4:53
2.	"Seaside"	3:23
3.	"Bug a Martini"	5:03
4.	"Apollo's Frock"	8:13
5.	"Tombigbee"	4:26
6.	"Indian Summer"	7:42
Total length:		33:43

== Charts ==
Chart performance for Welcome to Sunny Florida
Chart (2004)	Peak position
Dutch DVD Music Top 30 (Dutch Charts)	17
German Albums (Offizielle Top 100)	77
UK Music Video Chart (OCC)	1
