= Tori Amos: Complete Videos 1991–1998 =

1998 video album

Complete Videos 1991–1998

Video by Tori Amos
- Released: November 17, 1998
- Genres: Rock; pop
- Length: 75:00
- Label: Atlantic

Tori Amos chronology
Live from New York (1998)	Complete Videos 1991–1998 (1998)	A Sorta Fairytale (2003)

Tori Amos: The Complete Videos 1991–1998 is a VHS cassette of all of Tori Amos's videos from Little Earthquakes (1992) through From the Choirgirl Hotel (1998), with the exception of Professional Widow. The video collection was released in a standard-size hard plastic VHS case and a large soft plastic VHS case (with the same catalogue number). The video collection runs approximately 75 minutes and was released by Atlantic Records .

Tori Amos: The Complete Videos 1991–1998 was RIAA certified Gold in March 1999 .

== Track listing ==
Video	Album of origin	Director(s)	Notes
"Silent All These Years"	Little Earthquakes	Cindy Palmano	
"Cornflake Girl" (European version)	Under the Pink	Big TV!	Video set to the single edit
"Past the Mission"	Under the Pink	Jake Scott	
"China"	Little Earthquakes	Cindy Palmano	Video set to the single edit
"Raspberry Swirl"	From the Choirgirl Hotel	Barnaby and Scott	Video set to the Lip Gloss edit
"Hey Jupiter"	Boys for Pele	Earle Sebastian	Video set to the Dakota version (edit)
"Spark"	From the Choirgirl Hotel	James Brown	
"Caught a Lite Sneeze"	Boys for Pele	Mike Lipscombe	
"Winter"	Little Earthquakes	Cindy Palmano	Video set to the single edit
"Talula"	Boys for Pele	Mike Lipscombe	Video set to the Tornado Mix
"God"	Under the Pink	Melodie McDaniel	
"Crucify"	Little Earthquakes	Cindy Palmano	Video set to the single remix
"Jackie’s Strength"	From the Choirgirl Hotel	James Brown	
"Cornflake Girl" (American version)	Under the Pink	Tori Amos	Video set to the single edit
"Pretty Good Year"	Under the Pink	Cindy Palmano	
