= Taxi Ride =

Single by Tori Amos

from the album Scarlet's Walk
- Released: January 2003
- Recorded: 2002
- Studio: Martian Engineering (Cornwall)
- Genre: Alternative rock; folk pop
- Length: 4:00
- Label: Epic
- Songwriter: Tori Amos
- Producer: Tori Amos

Tori Amos singles chronology
"A Sorta Fairytale" (2002)	"Taxi Ride" (2003)	"Don't Make Me Come to Vegas" (2003)

"Taxi Ride" is a song by American singer-songwriter and pianist Tori Amos from her seventh studio album Scarlet's Walk (2002). The song was released as the album's second single in January 2003. It was written, composed and produced by Amos. The song is a folk pop track, which features instrumentation of electric guitars, drums, bongos, and acoustic guitar. The track was her second offering after departing from Atlantic Records and signed with Epic Records.

"Taxi Ride" received positive reviews from music critics, who complimented the song's production and lyrical delivery. The song charted at No. 35 on the Adult Top 40 and Radio & Records chart in the U.S. Amos has performed the song on several tours she has commissioned.

== Background ==
Tori Amos' track "Taxi Ride" appears on her seventh studio album, Scarlet's Walk (2002). In September 2001, Amos released her first concept album Strange Little Girls. Motherhood inspired Amos to produce a cover album, recording songs written by men about women and reversing the gender roles to show a woman's perspective. Amos would later reveal that a stimulus for the album was to end her contract with Atlantic without giving them new original songs; Amos felt that since 1998, the label had not been properly promoting her and had trapped her in a contract by refusing to sell her to another label. Nevertheless, Strange Little Girls received mostly favorable reviews from music critics, some who complimented the idea of twisting the male perspective into female views and the composition, while some dismissed this. It sold over 110,000 units in its first week in the US, reaching number four on the Billboard 200.

After leaving Atlantic, she signed to Epic Records to record the Scarlet's Walk album. However, Epic's President Polly Anthony announced her resignation that would be fulfilled in early 2003. Amos personally liked Anthony and was the reason why she signed to the label, so Amos formed Bridge Entertainment Group. However, Epic and Sony Music Entertainment merged with BMG as a result to the industry's sales decline. Despite this, Amos carried on recording the album. Scarlet's Walk was released in October 2002. Through the songs, Amos explores such topics as the history of America, American people, Native American history, pornography, masochism, homophobia and misogyny. It reached number seven on the Billboard 200 and was certified gold by the Recording Industry Association of America (RIAA).

== Composition ==
Written, composed and produced by Amos, "Taxi Ride" is a folk pop song. According to the music sheet at Musicnotes.com, "Taxi Ride" is set in the key of F minor. Performed in a moderately slow rhythmic pace of 80 beats per minute, Amos' vocals range span from F3 to E5. Lyrically, "Taxi Ride" is about the death of Amos' make-up artist and friend Kevyn Aucoin, who died of kidney and liver failure as a result of Acetaminophen toxicity in May 2002.

Amos commented extensively about the lyrical content on the Scarlet Selections;

When she gets to, um, Chicago, she's meeting up with people—mostly women—who have lost a gay friend. And in his death, she's, uh, kind of seeing what it brings out in people, and who some of these women really are. Not who she thought they were. Disillusionment again. Um, and in some cases, she kind of knew all along... with some of them. Some of them, it didn't surprise her. But she's seeing what, again, what people are really made up of. And you know, this isn't the outside now. This is not the enemy. The terrorist, you know, the terrorism just happened back in New York City. This is something, these were friends, acquaintances, maybe, in some cases. And the betrayal is there. So the idea of betrayal, you know, there's... there're all sorts. There are all kinds of betrayal. And I think she's trying to come to terms with that inside. The betrayal of an outside force, where then you become defensive and nationalistic. And then the betrayal that, wow, you're completely stripped bare because it's from the inside. It's an inside job. I really liked the idea that Scarlet takes a taxi all the way... all the way down. Because, let's face it, the people—she doesn't want to hitch a ride with anybody she knows, are you kidding me? I kind of loved the idea that all these things can happen in a stranger's car. It's always fascinated me, you know, the things that I see in taxi cabs over the years all over the world. So that's a little bit of my own kind of read on it.

== Release ==
"Taxi Ride" was released as the second single by Epic from Scarlet's Walk. It was released as a promotional CD single in Europe, which contained the radio edit of the track. The cover artwork features a black-and-white image of Amos, surrounded by an orange-and-white border. A promotional CD was released in Poland by Sony Music Entertainment Polska, which featured the album version of "Taxi Ride".

== Reception ==
"Taxi Ride" received mostly positive reviews from music critics. Greg Fasolino and Michael Zwirn from Trouser Press highlighted "Taxi Ride" and Scarlet's Walk tracks "Another Girl's Paradise" and "Don't Make Me Come to Vegas" as good tracks. They commented “This is her strongest work since Boys for Pele, and one of the best albums of her career.” Stephen Thomas Erlewine from Allmusic highlighted the song as an album stand out. Rolling Stone's editor Greg Kot complimented the lyrical content for being fun, highlighting the line "Even a glamorous bitch can be in need. Slant Magazine's Sal Cinquemani had cited "Taxi Ride" as the album's best track.

== Track listing ==
Promo-only single

1. "Taxi Ride" (radio edit) – 3:56

=== Weekly charts ===
Chart (2003)	Peak position
US Alternative Airplay (Billboard)	20
US Adult Pop Airplay (Billboard)	35
