= Sleeps with Butterflies =

Single by Tori Amos

from the album The Beekeeper
- Released: January 2005
- Recorded: 2004
- Studio: Martian Engineering (Cornwall)
- Genre: Baroque pop; piano rock
- Length: 3:35
- Label: Epic, Sony BMG
- Songwriter: Tori Amos
- Producer: Tori Amos

Tori Amos singles chronology
| "Mary" (2003) | "Sleeps with Butterflies" (2005) | "Sweet the Sting" (2005) |

"Sleeps with Butterflies" is a song written and recorded by American singer-songwriter and pianist Tori Amos. It served as the first single from her eighth studio album The Beekeeper (2005). As was the case with most of her singles from Scarlet's Walk, this single was released as a digital download only, although a promo CD single was produced for radio stations. The song appeared on radio stations in the United States beginning January 10, 2005, and was available as a digital download on January 12.

The song reached number two on the Radio & Records Triple A National Airplay chart for the week of March 18.

== Personnel ==
- Tori Amos – acoustic piano, vocals, producer
- Matt Chamberlin – drums
- Jon Evans – bass
- Mac Aladdin – acoustic and electric guitar

== Music video ==

The music video for "Sleeps with Butterflies" was directed by Laurent Briet, who has also worked with Radiohead and the Red Hot Chili Peppers. The concepts used by Briet in his music videos are largely influenced by illustrators; his interpretation of the video for "Sleeps with Butterflies" attests to that with the closing shot of the video stating that the video was inspired by the work of Aya Kato, a Japanese artist whose style fuses dark Art Nouveau with Japanese Pop art.

For the "Sleeps with Butterflies" video, Amos remains mostly stationary, standing, sitting, or lying down, and Kato's work was digitally recreated around Amos, incorporating her as the subject of each frame.

=== Weekly charts ===
| Chart (2005) | Peak position |
|---|---|
| US Adult Alternative Airplay (Billboard) | 4 |

== Performances ==
With her world tour not commencing until April, Amos embarked on a lengthy television and radio promotional tour for The Beekeeper upon its release, during which she performed the song, either solo or with her band, on numerous occasions:

- Late Show with David Letterman on February 17, 2005;
- Weekend Today, along with "Baker, Baker" from her 1994 album Under the Pink, on February 18;
- Live With Regis and Kelly on February 22;
- Last Call with Carson Daly, along with "The Power of Orange Knickers", on March 1;
- The Ellen DeGeneres Show with her band on March 15;
- The Late Late Show with Craig Ferguson on March 15 (although it was not aired until May 11);
- The Tonight Show with Jay Leno on April 21.

Amos recorded a performance of "Sleeps with Butterflies" which was included in the Exclusive Session EP exclusively available through iTunes.

Despite its status as lead single from the album, extensive promotion and the track's success on radio, Sleeps With Butterflies was barely played live during Amos' subsequent touring. The song was on the setlist for only 8 of a total 81 concerts on the Original Sinsuality Tour in 2005.
