= Sweet the Sting =

Single by Tori Amos

from the album The Beekeeper
- Released: 2005
- Recorded: 2004
- Studio: Martian Engineering (Cornwall)
- Genre: Soul; rock
- Length: 4:14
- Label: Epic; Sony BMG
- Songwriter: Tori Amos
- Producer: Tori Amos

Tori Amos singles chronology
"Sleeps with Butterflies" (2005)	"Sweet the Sting" (2005)	"Big Wheel" (2007)

"Sweet the Sting" is a song written and recorded by American singer-songwriter and pianist Tori Amos, released as the second single from the album The Beekeeper (2005). Following the trend of her several previous singles, "Sweet the Sting" was released as a promotional single only, with physical CDs produced for radio stations.

"Sweet the Sting" appeared on radio stations throughout the summer of 2005.

== Song info ==
On the limited edition of The Beekeeper, Amos explains the inspiration and correlation with one of the album's themes:

Elixirs and Herbs is a place that the passion that this woman has for her beliefs or the man that she loves, for the direction that humanity is going, is very much where she is exploring and allowing herself not only to heal what are wounds, but to allow her wounds to express themselves and this doesn't always have to be a place of victimization this sometimes is a place of being able to confront something that is out of balance and it is an ancient practice that the Bee shaman have been working with for thousands of years they work with a tradition that forces you to look at those places that may need to be stung and there's a song on this record in the Herbs and Elixirs garden called "Sweet the Sting" and in order for you or I to gain the sweetness, wisdom does not come without the sting.

== Track list ==
1. "Sweet the Sting" (Album Version) – 4:14

== Releases ==
=== Promo CD ===
Promotional CDs for "Sweet the Sting" were produced for radio stations, but dispersed sparsely, making it difficult to locate a copy of the single. Since the song was not re-mixed or edited for single release, a separate digital download of the single was not made available because the same version appeared on the previously released album.

The promotional CDs released contain only the album version of the song, with no accompanying B-sides or bonus material.

=== Music video ===

The music video for "Sweet the Sting" was recorded in 2005 and directed by Alex Smith. The sequence of the video takes place during a rehearsal with Amos's gospel choir, with whom she worked to record certain tracks on The Beekeeper, as well as at another location, showing Amos interacting with her crew, playing the piano alone in a small room, and singing without the gospel choir. Most of the video focuses on Amos playing the B3 Hammond organ and singing, making the "Sweet the Sting" a simpler, documentary-type video, compared to her other videos which often include a narrative story with elaborate props and technical camera work.

The music video for "Sweet the Sting" has been released on iTunes and subsequently on Amos's video compilation, Fade to Red (2006).

=== Miscellaneous ===
"Sweet the Sting" is one of three tracks from The Beekeeper subsequently included on Amos's 5-disc box set, A Piano: The Collection (2006).

== Personnel ==
- Tori Amos – acoustic piano, B3 Hammond organ, vocals, producer
- Matt Chamberlain – drums
- Jon Evans – bass guitar
- Mac Aladdin – acoustic and electric guitar
- London Community Gospel Choir – background vocals
