= Scarlet's Hidden Treasures =

- Cover of the 2023 remaster

EP by Tori Amos
- Released: May 18, 2004
- Studio: Martian Engineering (Cornwall, England)
- Genre: Alternative rock
- Length: 33:48; 40:36 (2023 remaster)
- Label: Epic
- Producer: Tori Amos

Tori Amos EP chronology
Hey Jupiter (1996)	Scarlet's Hidden Treasures (2004)	Exclusive Session (2005)

Scarlet's Hidden Treasures is an extended play (EP) by American singer-songwriter and pianist Tori Amos. Packaged with Amos' live video Welcome to Sunny Florida, the release collects six outtakes from the sessions for Scarlet's Walk (2002). Many of the tracks included also appeared on a web project entitled "Scarlet's Web" that was accessible to those who bought a copy of the album.

The track "Apollo's Frock" was partially conceived in 1996 during a live performance of "Doughnut Song" from the Boys for Pele era. "Bug a Martini" is a bossa nova–influenced piece featuring prominent use of a Wurlitzer electric piano.

"Mountain", a song featured on "Scarlet's Web", was not released as part of this collection, and remained unreleased outside of that platform until September 8th, 2023, when an expanded and remastered edition of Scarlet's Hidden Treasures was released digitally, bringing the EP's total length to 40:36, and also including "Operation Peter Pan", which was originally released as the B-side to "A Sorta Fairytale".

== Track listing ==
All tracks are written by Tori Amos.

Scarlet's Hidden Treasures
No.	Title	Length
1.	"Ruby Through the Looking-Glass"	4:53
2.	"Seaside"	3:23
3.	"Bug a Martini"	5:03
4.	"Apollo's Frock"	8:13
5.	"Tombigbee"	4:26
6.	"Indian Summer"	7:42
Total length:		33:46

2023 remaster
No.	Title	Length
7.	"Operation Peter Pan"	1:48
8.	"Mountain"	5:02
Total length:		40:36

== Personnel ==
- Tori Amos – Bösendorfer piano, Fender Rhodes piano, Wurlitzer electric piano, vocals
- Mac Aladdin – acoustic guitar
- Matt Chamberlain – drums
- Jon Evans – bass guitar
