= Exclusive Session (Tori Amos EP) =

EP by Tori Amos
- Released: 7 June 2005
- Recorded: 2005
- Genre: Alternative rock
- Length: 17:47
- Label: iTunes

Tori Amos EP chronology
Scarlet's Hidden Treasures (2004)	Exclusive Session (2005)	Christmastide (2020)

Exclusive Session is a live extended play (EP) by American singer-songwriter and pianist Tori Amos. The EP is the artist's first release exclusively through iTunes. Exclusive Session was initially available in May 2005 for UK and Germany iTunes Stores only, followed by United States stores in June 2005.

== Track listing ==
All tracks are written by Amos.

No.	Title	Length
1.	"Sleeps with Butterflies" (Live)	4:06
2.	"The Power of Orange Knickers" (Live)	3:46
3.	"Seaside" (Live)	4:06
4.	"Crazy" (Live)	5:49

== Personnel ==
- Tori Amos – piano and vocals
