= Mary (Tori Amos song) =

1992 song by Tori Amos

Song by Tori Amos
- A-side: "Crucify"
- Released: May 12, 1992
- Recorded: 1990
- Genre: Alternative rock
- Length: 4:27
- Label: Atlantic
- Songwriter: Tori Amos
- Producer: Davitt Sigerson

"Mary"

Single by Tori Amos

from the album Tales of a Librarian
- B-side: "Mary" (album version)
- Released: November 17, 2003
- Recorded: Summer 2003
- Genre: Alternative rock
- Length: 4:04 (single edit); 4:42 (album version)
- Label: Atlantic
- Songwriter: Tori Amos
- Producer: Tori Amos

Tori Amos singles chronology
"Don't Make Me Come to Vegas" (2003)	"Mary" (2003)	"Sleeps with Butterflies" (2005)

"Mary" is a song by American singer-songwriter and pianist Tori Amos. First released as a B-side to UK pressings of her 1992 single "Crucify", it was later re-recorded for the compilation album Tales of a Librarian (2003) and released as a digital single. Like many of Amos' singles, it was released digitally only but a promotional CD release was made for radio stations.

== Background ==
"Mary" was one of the ten tracks originally sent to Atlantic Records for Amos' debut album, Little Earthquakes. However, upon Atlantic's rejection of these tracks, more songs were written and it did not appear on the final album. Like all of the B-sides from the sessions for Little Earthquakes, it was included on the bonus disc of the album's 2015 deluxe edition.

Amos re-recorded "Mary" (along with fellow Little Earthquakes B-side "Sweet Dreams") in 2003 for the compilation Tales of a Librarian, backed by her usual band. This version was released as a single to promote the album and received a promotional music video that is yet to see a commercial release.

Amos continued to play "Mary" live throughout her career up to the American Doll Posse tour, after which it was dropped except for a single performance during the Unrepentant Geraldines Tour.

== Track listing ==
All songs written by Tori Amos.

1. "Mary" (Radio edit) – 4:04
2. "Mary" (Album version) – 4:40

== Personnel ==
Tales of a Librarian version:

Musicians:

- Tori Amos – Bösendorfer piano, lead vocals, backing vocals
- Mac Aladdin – guitar
- Jon Evans – bass, backing vocals
- Matt Chamberlain – drums, backing vocals
- Chelsea Laird – backing vocals
- Alison Evans – backing vocals
- Jon Astley – backing vocals
- Duncan Pickford – backing vocals

Technical:

- Tori Amos – production
- Mark Hawley – recording, mixing
- Marcel van Limbeek – recording, mixing
