= Don't Make Me Come to Vegas =

Single by Tori Amos

from the album Scarlet's Walk
- Released: May 27, 2003
- Studio: Martian Engineering (Cornwall)
- Genre: Rock (album version); dance (single version)
- Length: 4:51
- Label: Epic
- Songwriter: Tori Amos
- Producer: Tori Amos

Tori Amos singles chronology
"Taxi Ride" (2003)	"Don't Make Me Come to Vegas" (2003)	"Mary" (2003)

"Don't Make Me Come to Vegas" is a song by American singer-songwriter and pianist Tori Amos, released on her seventh studio album Scarlet's Walk (2002). A remixed dance version (subtitled "Timo on Tori") was released as a single on May 27, 2003.

The remixed version of "Don't Make Me Come to Vegas" reached number 6 on the Billboard Dance Club Songs chart and number 12 on the Dance Singles Sales chart.

== Track listings ==
12" Vinyl

1. "Don't Make Me Come to Vegas" (Timo on Tori)
2. "Don't Make Me Come to Vegas" (Timo on Tori Alternate Version)
3. "Don't Make Me Come to Vegas" (Timo on Tori Breaks Remix)

Digital single

1. "Don't Make Me Come to Vegas" (Timo on Tori)
2. "Don't Make Me Come to Vegas" (Timo on Tori Alternate Version)
3. "Don't Make Me Come to Vegas" (Timo on Tori Breaks Remix)
4. "Don't Make Me Come to Vegas" (LeFosse Mix)
5. "Don't Make Me Come to Vegas" (LeFosse A Capella)

== Charts ==
Year	Chart	Position
2003	U.S. Hot Dance Club Play	6
2003	U.S. Hot Dance Single Sales	12
