= Crucify (song) =

1992 single by Tori Amos

Single by Tori Amos

from the album Little Earthquakes
- B-side: "Winter"; "Angie"; "Smells Like Teen Spirit"; "Thank You"; "Here. In My Head"; "Mary"
- Released: May 12, 1992
- Studio: Capitol Studios (Los Angeles)
- Genre: Alternative pop; alternative rock
- Length: 4:58
- Label: Atlantic (US, Canada); EastWest (international)
- Songwriter: Tori Amos
- Producers: Ian Stanley; Davitt Sigerson

Tori Amos singles chronology
"Winter" (1992)	"Crucify" (1992)	"Cornflake Girl" (1994)

Tori Amos EP chronology
Crucify (1992)	Hey Jupiter (1996)

Professional ratings
Review scores
Source	Rating
AllMusic	3.5/5 stars
Robert Christgau	(dud)
The Rolling Stone Album Guide	4/5 stars

"Crucify" is a song by American singer-songwriter and pianist Tori Amos. It was released as the fifth single from her debut studio album Little Earthquakes, on May 12, 1992, by Atlantic Records in North America and on June 8 by EastWest Records in the UK. In Australia, it was released on July 20, 1992.

== Background ==
The song served as the fifth single from the album Little Earthquakes. It was released as an EP in the US and as a single in Europe and Australia.

The EP version of the same name includes a single remix, famous cover versions, and "Winter", which was released earlier as a single from the album. It sold 450,000 copies in the US according to Soundscan as of 2005, coming close to a Gold certification. Although the EP sold extremely well, it failed to chart on the Billboard 200. The length of this EP is 20:50.

The UK CD single includes the songs "Here. In My Head" and "Mary", which are B-sides of "Crucify". The UK limited-edition EP includes live versions of "Crucify", "Little Earthquakes", "Mother", and "Precious Things".

== Legacy ==
The song has been covered by Sharon den Adel, vocalist of Within Temptation, and Nolwenn Leroy, French singer.

== Track listings ==
=== U.S. release (May 1992) ===
Cassette single – Atlantic 4-87463
No.	Title	Length
1.	"Crucify (Remix)"	4:18
2.	"Me and a Gun"	3:42

CD EP – Atlantic 7 82399-2 / Cassette EP – Atlantic 7 82399-4
No.	Title	Writer(s)	Length
1.	"Crucify (Remix)"		4:18
2.	"Winter"		5:41
3.	"Angie"	Mick Jagger, Keith Richards	4:25
4.	"Smells Like Teen Spirit"	Kurt Cobain, Krist Novoselic, Dave Grohl	3:17
5.	"Thank You"	Robert Plant, Jimmy Page	3:49

=== U.K. release (June 1992) ===
7-inch single – EastWest A7479 / Cassette single – EastWest A7479C
No.	Title	Length
1.	"Crucify (Remix)"	4:18
2.	"Here. In My Head"	3:53

CD single 1 – EastWest A7479CD
No.	Title	Length
1.	"Crucify (Remix)"	4:18
2.	"Here. In My Head"	3:53
3.	"Mary"	4:27
4.	"Crucify (Alternate mix)" (misprinted as "LP version")	4:58

CD single 2 (Limited Edition) – EastWest A7479CDX
No.	Title	Length
1.	"Little Earthquakes (Live)"	6:58
2.	"Crucify (Live)"	5:19
3.	"Precious Things (Live)"	5:03
4.	"Mother (Live)"	6:37

Live tracks recorded at the Cambridge Corn Exchange, 5th April 1992.

== Personnel ==
- Tori Amos – acoustic piano, vocals
- Jef Scott – bass
- Ed Greene – drums
- Paulinho Da Costa – percussion
- John Chamberlin – mandolin
- Eric Williams – ukulele
- Nancy Shanks (Beene), Tina Gullickson – backgrounds
- John Beverly Jones – sound recording
- Leslie Ann Jones – assistance
- Paul McKenna – mixing
- Davitt Sigerson – producer
- Ian Stanley – producer

== Charts ==
Chart (1992–1993)	Peak position
Australia (ARIA)	83
Canada Top Singles (RPM)	74
Canada Adult Contemporary (RPM)	33
Europe (Eurochart Hot 100)	41
France (SNEP)	17
Germany (GfK)	84
Ireland (IRMA)	25
Netherlands (Single Top 100)	79
New Zealand (Recorded Music NZ)	17
Sweden (Sverigetopplistan)	16
UK Singles (Official Charts)	15
UK Airplay (Music Week)	50
US Alternative Airplay (Billboard)	22
US Cash Box Top 100	52

== Release history ==
Region	Date	Format(s)	Label(s)	Ref.
United States	May 12, 1992	—N/a	Atlantic	
United Kingdom	June 8, 1992	7-inch vinyl; CD	EastWest	
Australia	July 20, 1992	CD	EastWest	
Australia	July 27, 1992	Cassette	EastWest	

== Appearances of the song on television ==
=== Live performances ===
Tori Amos performed "Crucify" on Late Night with David Letterman in May, 1992, and on CBS This Morning on September 9, 1992. She also played it on The Tonight Show with Jay Leno on January 13, 1993, along with the song "Winter." Additionally, she played "Crucify" live on MTV in 1992, as well as on Top of the Pops.

=== Music video ===
The "Crucify" video, directed by Cindy Palmano (photographer and video director) and Atlantic Records, was released in 1992 as well. It was shot using the radio edit of "Crucify" that can be found on the Crucify EP and single release, but the version used on Tori's 2006 Fade to Red 2DVD set is an edited version of the remastered track that is found on the compilation Tales of a Librarian. It includes images of Tori at the piano shot using overhead cameras, twin Toris who sing together at a counter, clothing "reminiscent of Anne Boleyn," and shots of Tori climbing into a bathtub fully dressed, then dancing in the wet dress.

Cindy Palmano has said that Atlantic Records finished the video because "I took it to a certain stage and then the record company wanted to edit it in a different way." Yet she approves of the bathtub sequence: "I like when she steps into the bath and comes out of the bath. It all looks really Hitchcock, I love it." (Palmano also directed the videos "Silent All These Years," "Winter," "China" and "Pretty Good Year," this last one from Amos' second album, Under the Pink.)

The music video can be found on Little Earthquakes, Tori Amos: Complete Videos 1991-1998 and Fade to Red: Video Collection.

== Later appearances of "Crucify" ==
In 2003, Tori Amos released the compilation album Tales of a Librarian, which included remastered versions of many of her most popular songs. The original LP version of "Crucify" was one of them.

Amos has performed "Crucify" differently live in recent years, with the verses being performed slower and with some degree of repetition. One example of how she plays it now can be found on the Welcome to Sunny Florida DVD.
