= Sanji (director) =

American music video director

Sanjeeva Senaka
- Occupations: Music director; film director

Sanjeeva "Sanji" Senaka is an American music video director. He has directed videos for Lauryn Hill, Mary J. Blige, The Pharcyde, and Tori Amos, among others. His music video for "Everything Is Everything" by Lauryn Hill was nominated for the MTV Video Music Award for Best Direction and the Grammy Award for Best Music Video. His videos have been nominated four other times for MTV Awards, including Breakthrough Video for Maxwell's "This Woman's Work". Sanji's video for "No More Drama" by Mary J. Blige won the MTV Video Music Award for Best R&B Video in 2002.

Initially directing music videos for Propaganda Films, he signed to FM Rocks in 1998.

Sanji had initially been attached to make his directorial debut in Blood & Chocolate, but later left the film. He was also in talks to direct a remake of the Korean horror film Into the Mirror, but he wound up not directing, and it was later released as Mirrors in 2008. Jennifer Lopez recommended Sanji to direct her hip-hop opera/musical film Carmen for Universal, written by Baz Luhrmann's writing partner, Craig Pearce. Universal sidelined the project, however. In 2019, Sanji directed an episode of Star Trek: Short Treks entitled "Ask Not," which was nominated for an Primetime Emmy Award for Outstanding Short Form Comedy or Drama Series.

== Videography ==
- "Passin' Me By" by The Pharcyde (1993)
- "If I Had No Loot" by Tony! Toni! Toné! (1993)
- "I Got You" by Johnny Gill (1993)
- "Can't Get Enough" by Willie Max (1998)
- "I'm Not Your Girlfriend" by Willie Max (1999)
- "Get Involved" by Raphael Saadiq and Q-Tip (1999)
- "Everything Is Everything" by Lauryn Hill (1999)
- "The Platform" by Dilated Peoples (2000)
- "This Woman's Work" by Maxwell (2002)
- "No More Drama" by Mary J. Blige (2002)
- "A Sorta Fairytale" by Tori Amos (2002)
- "Love's Divine" by Seal (2003)
- "Ooh!" by Mary J. Blige (2003)
- "Star" by The Roots (2004)
- "She's No You" by Jesse McCartney (2005)
- "Me Haces Falta" by Jennifer Lopez (2007)
- "I Want You" by Common (2007)
- "Break Anotha" by Blake Lewis (2008)
- "Underneath" by Alanis Morissette (2008)
- "Leavin'" by Jesse McCartney (2008)
- "IfULeave" by Musiq Soulchild featuring Mary J. Blige (2008)
- "Love You More" by JLS (2010)
- "Just a Dream" by Nelly (2010)
- "Turn Me On" by David Guetta featuring Nicki Minaj (2012)
- "Never Should Have" by Ashanti (2013)
- "My Kind of Love" by Emeli Sandé (2013)
- "Emotion (Ain't Nobody)" by Maverick Sabre (2014)
- "Woman (Oh Mama)" by Joy Williams (2015)

== General references ==
- https://www.tvinsider.com/945517/star-trek-short-treks-watch-for-free-streaming/
- https://variety.com/2005/film/markets-festivals/musicvid-helmer-sees-into-regency-s-mirror-1117922096/
