= Scarlet's Walk =

Studio album by Tori Amos
- Released: October 28, 2002
- Recorded: 2001–2002
- Studios: Martian Engineering (Cornwall, England); Sony Music Studios (London, England)
- Genre: Alternative rock
- Length: 74:09
- Label: Epic
- Producer: Tori Amos

Tori Amos chronology
Strange Little Girls (2001)	Scarlet's Walk (2002)	Tales of a Librarian (2003)

Singles from Scarlet's Walk
- 1. "A Sorta Fairytale" Released: September 2002; 2. "Taxi Ride" Released: January 2003; 3. "Don't Make Me Come to Vegas" Released: May 27, 2003

Scarlet's Walk is the seventh studio album by American singer-songwriter and pianist Tori Amos. It was released on October 28, 2002, in the UK and October 29 in the US on Epic Records, making it her first release on the label after her split with Atlantic Records. Her first studio album of original material since To Venus and Back in 1999, the 18-track concept album (described by Amos as a "sonic novel about a road trip") details the cross-country travels of Scarlet, a character loosely based on Amos, and was greatly inspired by the changes in American society and politics post-September 11, 2001. Topics explored on the album include nationalism, personal relationships, and the death of a close friend. Amos also took inspiration from the stories of her grandfather, who she claims was Cherokee and told her of the abuses against Native Americans throughout the United States' history.

Recorded at Amos's Martian Engineering in Cornwall, England, Scarlet's Walk solidified Amos's current backing band of Jon Evans on bass, Matt Chamberlain on drums, and Mac Aladdin on guitar. Additionally, string arrangements were provided by John Philip Shenale. The self-produced album diverts from the electronica and trip hop-influenced sounds of From the Choirgirl Hotel and To Venus and Back and marks a return to the stripped-back sound of her earlier work with a greater emphasis on live instrumentation and Amos's piano, while also incorporating new keyboard instruments into the arrangements, such as the prominent use of Wurlitzer and Fender Rhodes electric pianos. The packaging featured Polaroid-esque photography by Kurt Markus. Scarlet's Walk would also be released as a limited-edition box set with bonus content.

The album was a commercial success, reaching number seven in the US and becoming Amos's fourth top 10 album. It sold 107,000 copies in its first week and reached RIAA Gold status about a month after its release. It spawned the singles "A Sorta Fairytale", "Taxi Ride", and "Don't Make Me Come to Vegas", the former reaching number two on the US adult alternative chart and becoming one of her most popular songs. Considered one of her best and most conceptually elaborate works, it received positive reviews and was supported by the "On Scarlet's Walk" tour throughout 2002–03.

== Background ==
Scarlet's Walk was the follow-up to Amos' previous album Strange Little Girls, which was released in 2001 and fulfilled her contract with Atlantic Records. A primary motivation for Amos' switch from Atlantic to Epic was the presence of Polly Anthony, the president of Epic, whom Amos felt would be committed to properly promoting her work as she had felt that Atlantic had not promoted her recent releases to the proper extent and had felt trapped in her contract due to the label's refusal to sell her to another label. Amos would later experience further frustrations as Anthony stepped down from her position after the release of Scarlet's Walk in 2003.

In addition to cementing her longest-running backing lineup, guitar contributions were also made by David Torn and Robbie McIntosh. It would become Amos' fourth consecutive release to be primarily recorded at her studio, Martian Engineering in Cornwall, England. Production was handled by Amos (as has been the case for all her albums since Boys for Pele), and the album was mixed by her husband Mark Hawley and Marcel van Limbeek.

== Music and lyrics ==
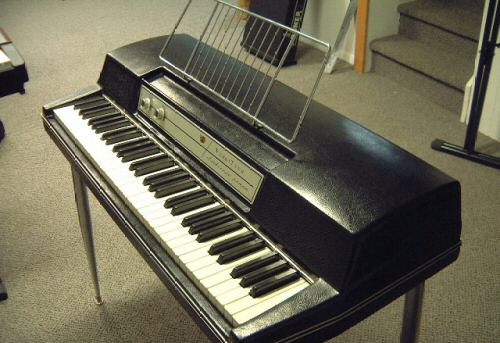
In addition to Amos' trademark Bösendorfer piano, Scarlet's Walk featured extensive use of the Wurlitzer electric piano.

Scarlet's Walk follows the journey of the titular character across America after September 11, 2001, and the songs describe her encounters with various characters and facets of American life after the attacks. At the time, Amos' recent releases experimented heavily with electronic elements, with extensive use of synthesizers in place of her piano on many songs. Scarlet's Walk was a conscious return to a stripped-down sound, with Amos saying in an interview with Keyboard Magazine:

Scarlet came at a time when I had experimented with all forms of keyboards, from harpsichord to synthesizers to sampled things, and each album that I’ve done, I think has taught me something about a different facet of the keyboard world. With Scarlet’s Walk, it wasn’t about sampled sounds. I needed to capture the authenticity of the land, so I used instruments that weren’t a sample of themselves. And I was also trying to tap into that ‘great American road trip’. And the Wurly and the Rhodes lent themselves to that. But we were going for more of that classic songwriting, sonically nostalgic feeling.

Additionally, she looked to 1970s-era albums as references for the songs' overall structures and sound, with Fleetwood Mac's Rumours and Neil Young's Harvest being listed as particularly significant influences.

"Amber Waves", the album's opening track, describes Scarlet's encounter with a porn star of the same name. The name "Amber Waves" is both a reference to a character from the film Boogie Nights, as well as the lyric "amber waves of grain" from "America the Beautiful". The song describes the toll the character's work has taken on her and how her dreams of becoming a successful actress have gone awry ("From ballet class to lap dance and straight to video"). On certain occasions, Amos has integrated portions of "America the Beautiful" into "Amber Waves" in live performances. "A Sorta Fairytale", the album's first single, tells the story of the melancholy of Scarlet's experience taking a drive up the Pacific Coast Highway with someone whom she is in a failing relationship with. As Amos described in the "Scarlet's Walk bio", a press release for the album, "They take the big trip in the classic car up the Pacific Coast highway and across the desert. But as they go on, the masks drop away and they discover the fantasy they have of each other isn't who they really are." The Southern boogie-style "Wednesday" contains multiple short movements with varying instrumentation, including sections featuring a full band arrangement and wah-wah guitar, to solo piano-and-vocal sections. Amos described the song as depicting Scarlet's relationship with "a man who harbours secrets", extending the song's meaning to the peoples' trust in the ideals of America and how that trust is broken.

"Strange" is the first of many songs on the album to tackle the unjust treatment of Native Americans in the United States. The Scarlet's Walk bio describes this part of the character's journey as "[taking] her to the sites of some of the last stands of the native American people, including Little Big Horn. From there she journeys on through the Bad Lands." The song was later released as a promotional single. "Carbon" describes Scarlet's meeting with a character sharing the song's name who suffers from bipolar disorder. Skiing imagery is heavily present throughout the lyrics, with references to ski runs such as "bear's claw", "free fall", and "gunner's view"; both carbon and skiing are used as metaphors for the character's desire to partake in self-destructive behaviors ("carbon made only wants to be unmade"). The song experiments with mixed meter, frequently shifting between 6/8 and 7/8.

The CD's about America—it's a story that's also a journey, that begins in LA and crosses the country, slowly heading east. America's in there, and specific places and things, Native American history and pornography and a girl on a plane who'll never get to New York, and Oliver Stone and Andrew Jackson and madness and a lot more. Not to mention a girl called Scarlet who may be the land and may be a person and may be a trail of blood.

— Neil Gaiman, author and friend of Amos

The a cappella "Wampum Prayer" also tackles the subject of the atrocities committed against Native Americans, with Scarlet hearing the voice and song of an old Apache woman, a survivor of a massacre whose site Scarlet has recently visited. The song was used to open each night of the "On Scarlet's Walk" tour. Featuring prominent fretless bass playing from Evans, "Don't Make Me Come to Vegas" revolves around Scarlet struggling with a call from her niece who is being mistreated by a man she has committed to a relationship with. As Amos said in "Scarlet Stories", "it's one of those moments where, even if you have a resolve to not go to a place and do something, there's something that pulls at you, especially when you remember somebody as a little girl." The "Timo on Tori" remix of "Don't Make Me Come to Vegas" would become a dance hit for Amos after being released (along with other remixes of the song) as the album's third single in 2003. In "Sweet Sangria", Scarlet meets a "revolutionary-type character" fighting American intervention in Central and South America. While Scarlet supports the cause of the revolutionaries, she struggles to commit to violence against either side: "although she believes in the cause, she can't load the gun... It's about what you believe in and how far you're prepared to go." In "Your Cloud", Scarlet arrives at a monument mourning Cherokee Native Americans who were killed in the Trail of Tears. The song revolves around the themes of separation:

It's about separating that which you cannot separate, not really. There will be strands, there will be molecules. And taking those people from their land, the land of the ancestors. Taking a child away from its mother. That doesn't mean that there aren't pieces of that child still in that mother just because it's been, you know, delivered from her womb. Because a couple separates doesn't mean that there aren't pieces of him still in her.

"Pancake" criticizes those who use their power to rally people for certain causes without fighting for said causes themselves. The song sees Scarlet encounter a "Messiah figure" who exploits his power and influence: "He doesn't uphold the values which he preaches. He's deaf to the real needs of the people and is becoming drunk on the kind of power which he once denounced." Despite its apparent association with the September 11 attacks, "I Can't See New York" was written months earlier. In the song, Scarlet witnesses a plane crash whilst on a plane herself, and experiences the fear and panic felt by a woman on the crashed plane before her death. "Mrs. Jesus" depicts Scarlet's encounter with a character of the same name; the song tackles the subject of religious fanatisicm and the effects of Christianity on America's history. "Taxi Ride" is a partial homage to the late make-up artist Kevyn Aucoin, a friend of Amos's who died in May 2002, and served as the second single from the album. An on-line contest was held asking fans to direct and submit a music video for the song. Amos said of the song and its connection to Aucoin:

I knew he was in a lot of pain, and he felt betrayed by people who weren't there when he was in need. Then everybody who shows up in his death can give a statement, but they weren't there in the trenches. His death brought up a lot of things in people -- some lovely and some despicable and disgusting. "Taxi" is for Kevyn.

…when I think being around all these women who have all these different kind of… perceptions of each other and, you could say, some of them are intimidated by each other and some of them are envious and some of them... really kind of like the other one, but are afraid of being rejected, so they don't know how to approach them.

— Tori Amos on "Another Girl's Paradise"

Scarlet makes her way into Florida in "Another Girl's Paradise", a song which relates to the different dimensions of relationships between women, and feelings of envy and intimidation. The title track took inspiration from stories told to Amos by her grandfather, who she claims was Cherokee. The song depicts the climax of Scarlet's story, where after meeting other characters during her journey and seeing their path, she has decided on her own. Amos has also stated that the song was written to expose the Indian Removal Act in 1830 and its stealing of Native American land. "Virginia" tackles the hypocrisy of a nation built on notions of freedom denying it to the Native American population. The song personifies America as a young girl, and explores the concept of being able to warn it about the troubles that will come in the future. The song features McIntosh playing a Dobro resonator guitar. In the heavily orchestrated closing track, "Gold Dust", Scarlet has given birth to her daughter and has the experience of having another life depending on her. Additionally, Amos has stated that the song is about "being other people and feeling how they feel", and how one's own personal experiences stick with themselves and create their story (Amos uses the metaphor of a "body map" in the Scarlet Stories commentary). The song was later re-recorded on, and lent its name to, Amos' 2012 album Gold Dust, featuring orchestrated re-recordings of songs from her back catalogue.

== Release and promotion ==
Scarlet's Walk saw release on October 28, 2002, in the UK and was released a day later in the US. Peaking at number seven on the Billboard 200, it became her fourth album to reach the top ten in the US. The album would also reach the top 20 in six additional countries (including a top ten placement in Germany) and be certified Gold by the RIAA for sales in excess of 500,000 copies. In addition to the standard release, a limited edition box set was released with slightly altered cover art, a bonus disc ("Scarlet's DVD", which included content for "Gold Dust", "A Sorta Fairytale", and "Taxi Ride"), and collectibles. Advance copies of the album sent to reviewers were sealed inside Sony Walkman players with glue to prevent Internet trading of the album. Headphones were also glued to the players to prevent listeners from connecting recording devices to them. As another incentive to curb piracy, the physical CD release provided entry to "Scarlet's Web", a website that was the sole source for additional tracks, tour photos, and other content. All tracks included on "Scarlet's Web" (with the exception of "Mountain") would later be included on the Scarlet's Hidden Treasures EP, released as a companion to the 2004 live video Welcome to Sunny Florida. Scarlet Stories, a disc of commentary by Amos about each of the album's songs, was released as part of the "Get Tori as a Gift — Get a Gift From Tori" promotion, being given as a free bonus to those who bought two copies of Scarlet's Walk at indie retailers.

"A Sorta Fairytale" (backed with the non-album track "Operation Peter Pan") was released as the album's first single and reached number two on the US Triple A chart and 14 on the Bubbling Under Hot 100 and became one of her biggest radio hits. A music video was made for the song, directed by Sanji. It depicts Amos as a head with a disembodied leg falling in love with a head with a disembodied arm (played by Adrien Brody). After kissing, the video ends with them growing the rest of their body parts, and becoming "whole" from their love. The music video later received its own DVD release, with extras including a "making of" for the video and an interview with Amos. The second single, "Taxi Ride", reached number 20 on the US Triple A chart and number 35 on the Adult Top 40. Remixes of "Don't Make Me Come to Vegas" by Timo Maas served as the third and final single from the album. The single (Amos' last commercially available, physical single release to date) reached number six on the US Dance Club Songs chart and number 12 on the Dance Singles Sales chart in the summer of 2003. Finally, "Strange" would receive a promotional single release later that year.

== Critical reception ==
Professional ratings
Aggregate scores
Source	Rating
Metacritic	76/100
Review scores
Source	Rating
AllMusic	4.5/5 stars
Alternative Press	4/5 stars
The Austin Chronicle	4/5 stars
Blender	5/5 stars
Entertainment Weekly	D−
PopMatters	9/10
Rolling Stone	3.5/5 stars
Spin	9/10
Stylus Magazine	C+
Uncut	4/5 stars

Scarlet's Walk garnered a positive reception from critics. At Metacritic, which assigns a normalised rating out of 100 to reviews from mainstream publications, the album received an average score of 76 based on 21 reviews, indicating "generally positive reviews". PopMatters gave the album a score of 9 out of 10 and referred to it as "As ambitious as anything in recent pop music memory," going on to call it "one of the most invigorating and arresting works of her career." AllMusic's Stephen Thomas Erlewine rated the album 4.5 stars out of 5, stating the album "marks a return to the sound and feel of Under the Pink" and called Scarlet's Walk Amos's best album since that release.

In Rolling Stone's "Tori Amos Album Guide", Scarlet's Walk received a rating of 3.5 out of 5, with the magazine calling it "her most carefully crafted and inviting album since Little Earthquakes". Blender gave the album a perfect 5 out of 5 score, calling it "her most fully realized [album] yet" and highlighting the songs' arrangements and imagery.

== Track listing ==
All tracks are written by Tori Amos.

No.	Title	Length
1.	"Amber Waves"	3:38
2.	"A Sorta Fairytale"	5:30
3.	"Wednesday"	2:29
4.	"Strange"	3:05
5.	"Carbon"	4:33
6.	"Crazy"	4:23
7.	"Wampum Prayer"	0:44
8.	"Don't Make Me Come to Vegas"	4:51
9.	"Sweet Sangria"	4:01
10.	"Your Cloud"	4:30
11.	"Pancake"	3:54
12.	"I Can't See New York"	7:14
13.	"Mrs. Jesus"	3:05
14.	"Taxi Ride"	4:00
15.	"Another Girl's Paradise"	3:34
16.	"Scarlet's Walk"	4:16
17.	"Virginia"	3:55
18.	"Gold Dust"	5:54
Total length:		74:09

== Personnel ==
- Tori Amos – Bösendorfer piano, Rhodes electric piano, Wurlitzer electric piano, ARP synthesizer, vocals
- David Torn – electric guitar (6, 16), acoustic guitar (6)
- Mac Aladdin – electric guitar (2, 3, 11, 12, 15, 16), acoustic guitar (5)
- Robbie McIntosh – electric guitar (1, 3, 6, 14), acoustic guitar (2, 3, 14), Dobro (17)
- Jon Evans – bass guitar
- Matt Chamberlain – drums, percussion
- Sinfonia of London – strings
- John Philip Shenale – string arrangements, chamberlain flutes (13)
- David Firman – conductor
- Peter Willison – director of strings (4, 13, 18)
- Scott Smalley – orchestration

== Charts ==
=== Weekly charts ===
==== Original release ====
Weekly chart performance for Scarlet's Walk
Chart (2002)	Peak position
Australian Albums (ARIA)	20
Austrian Albums (Ö3 Austria)	26
Belgian Albums (Ultratop Flanders)	15
Belgian Albums (Ultratop Wallonia)	40
Canadian Albums (Billboard)	13
Danish Albums (Hitlisten)	32
Dutch Albums (Album Top 100)	17
European Albums (Eurotipsheet)	17
Finnish Albums (Suomen virallinen lista)	20
French Albums (SNEP)	32
German Albums (Offizielle Top 100)	9
Irish Albums (IRMA)	24
Italian Albums (FIMI)	26
New Zealand Albums (RMNZ)	45
Norwegian Albums (VG-lista)	30
Polish Albums (ZPAV)	10
Scottish Albums (Official Charts)	28
Swiss Albums (Schweizer Hitparade)	21
UK Albums (Official Charts)	26
US Billboard 200	7

=== Year-end charts ===
2002 year-end chart performance for Scarlet's Walk
Chart (2002)	Position
Canadian Alternative Albums (Nielsen SoundScan)	96

==== 2023 vinyl release ====
Weekly chart performance for 2023 vinyl release of Scarlet's Walk
Chart (2023)	Peak position
Scottish Albums (Official Charts)	42
UK Album Sales (OCC)	38
UK Vinyl Albums (OCC)	21
US Top Album Sales (Billboard)	29
US Vinyl Albums (Billboard)	10

=== Singles ===
Chart performance for singles from Scarlet's Walk
Year	Song	Peak positions							
Year	Song	US Bubbling	US Adult	US R&R Triple A Airplay	US Dance	US Dance Sales	UK	CAN	GER
2002	"A Sorta Fairytale"	14	11	1	—	9*	41	6	98
2003	"Taxi Ride"	—	35	17	—	—	—	—	—
2003	"Don't Make Me Come to Vegas" (remix)	—	—	—	6	12	—	—	—

- Billboard Hot Single Sales chart (2003)

== Certifications ==
Certifications for Scarlet's Walk
Region	Certification	Certified units/sales
United States (RIAA)	Gold	618,000

== Release history ==
Release history for Scarlet's Walk
Region	Date	Label	Format(s)	Cat. No.	Ref.
United Kingdom	October 28, 2002	Epic	CD; CD+DVD	5087822; 5087829	
United States	October 29, 2002	Epic	CD; CD+DVD	EK 86412; EK 86939	
