= Strange Little Girls =

2001 album by Tori Amos

Studio album by Tori Amos
- Released: September 18, 2001
- Recorded: February–July 2001
- Studios: Martian Studios, Cornwall; The Nut Ranch, Los Angeles
- Length: 62:09
- Label: Atlantic
- Producer: Tori Amos

Tori Amos chronology
To Venus and Back (1999)	Strange Little Girls (2001)	Scarlet's Walk (2002)

Singles from Strange Little Girls
- 1. "Strange Little Girl" Released: October 9, 2001

Strange Little Girls is a concept album released by American singer-songwriter and pianist Tori Amos in 2001. The album's 12 tracks are covers of songs written and originally performed by men, reinterpreted by Amos from a female point of view. Amos created female personae for each track (one song featured twins) and was photographed as each, with makeup done by Kevyn Aucoin.

== Background ==
As with Amos's previous two studio albums, the cover album was recorded at her Cornwall studio.

In the United States the album was issued with four alternative covers depicting Amos as the characters singing "Happiness Is a Warm Gun", "Strange Little Girl", "Time", and "Raining Blood". A fifth cover of the "I Don't Like Mondays" character was also issued in the UK and other territories. Text accompanying the photos and songs was written by author Neil Gaiman. The complete short stories in which this text appears can be found in Gaiman's 2006 collection Fragile Things.

Amos later acknowledged that she had attempted to reinterpret four other songs that she "couldn't find her way into". They were "Fear of a Black Planet" by Public Enemy, "Hoover Factory" by Elvis Costello, "I'm Sick of You" by Iggy Pop and "Marlene Dietrich's Favorite Poem" by Peter Murphy. Aside from "Hoover Factory", these tracks have not been released. She also mentioned later in a 2012 interview that, with drummer Matt Chamberlain, she had recorded "Growin' Up" by Bruce Springsteen for this album, which was released on streaming services in 2025. The covers of Costello and Springsteen, plus two more by David Bowie and Alice Cooper, appear on the 2026 reissue of the album. Gaiman's contributions to the album were removed from the 2026 reissue.

== Reception ==
Professional ratings
Aggregate scores
Source	Rating
Metacritic	65/100
Review scores
Source	Rating
AllMusic	2.5/5 stars
Alternative Press	7/10
The Austin Chronicle	3/5 stars
Blender	4/5 stars
Entertainment Weekly	B
The Guardian	4/5 stars
Los Angeles Times	2.5/4 stars
Q	3/5 stars
Rolling Stone	3.5/5 stars
Slant Magazine	3.5/5 stars

The album received mixed reviews upon its release in September 2001 with critics largely seeing the album as a mixed bag, praising the unlikely re-workings of Eminem's "'97 Bonnie & Clyde" and Slayer's "Raining Blood", while panning the versions of the Beatles' "Happiness Is a Warm Gun" and Neil Young's "Heart of Gold". Amos also tackled songs by artists such as Tom Waits, the Velvet Underground, Depeche Mode, and the Stranglers.

The album's greatest attention was garnered from Amos's cover of Eminem's "'97 Bonnie & Clyde", a rap song. The album's cover of "Happiness Is a Warm Gun" was translated into a discussion on the right to bear arms, and included soundbites from both George W. Bush and George H. W. Bush, as well as from Amos's own minister father.

Amos received two 2002 Grammy nominations: Female Rock Vocal Performance for "Strange Little Girl", and Alternative Music Album for the album.

== Commercial performance ==
The album entered the charts at US No. 4, selling 111,000 copies, making it her third album to debut in the US Top 10, her second-highest debut in terms of sales, and her best position in the US for almost six years.

== Singles ==
A planned EP, Strange Little Girl, including the title song (originally by the Stranglers), "After All" (originally by David Bowie) and "Only Women Bleed" (originally by Alice Cooper), was pulled from shelves soon after being shipped to stores in Europe. Despite being recalled from the shelves, limited copies of the single were sold and a promotional video was made.

== Track listing ==
No.	Title	Writer(s)	Original artist	Length
1.	"New Age"	Lou Reed	The Velvet Underground	4:37
2.	"'97 Bonnie & Clyde"	Marshall Mathers, Jeff Bass, Mark Bass	Eminem	5:46
3.	"Strange Little Girl"	Brian Duffy, Dave Greenfield, Hans Wärmling, Hugh Cornwell, Jean-Jacques Burnel	The Stranglers	3:50
4.	"Enjoy the Silence"	Martin Gore	Depeche Mode	4:10
5.	"I'm Not in Love"	Eric Stewart, Graham Gouldman	10cc	5:39
6.	"Rattlesnakes"	Lloyd Cole, Neil Clark	Lloyd Cole and the Commotions	3:59
7.	"Time"	Tom Waits	Tom Waits	5:23
8.	"Heart of Gold"	Neil Young	Neil Young	4:00
9.	"I Don't Like Mondays"	Bob Geldof, Johnnie Fingers	The Boomtown Rats	4:21
10.	"Happiness Is a Warm Gun"	John Lennon, Paul McCartney	The Beatles	9:55
11.	"Raining Blood"	Jeff Hanneman, Kerry King	Slayer	6:22
12.	"Real Men"	Joe Jackson	Joe Jackson	4:07
Total length:				62:09

2026 expanded edition bonus tracks
No.	Title	Writer(s)	Original artist	Length
1.	"Growing Up"	Bruce Springsteen	Bruce Springsteen
2.	"Hoover Factory"	Elvis Costello	Elvis Costello
3.	"After All"	David Bowie	David Bowie
4.	"Only Women Bleed"	Alice Cooper, Dick Wagner	Alice Cooper

=== B-sides ===
Like most of Amos' albums, this one also features B-sides on its singles, but this time only two were released.

Title	Writer(s)	Original artist	Single
"After All"	David Bowie	David Bowie	"Strange Little Girl" (2001)
"Only Women Bleed"	Alice Cooper, Dick Wagner	Alice Cooper	"Strange Little Girl" (2001)

== Personnel ==
- Tori Amos – lead vocals, Wurlitzer, Bösendorfer, Rhodes, ARP
- Matt Chamberlain – drums, military drum, taos drums
- Adrian Belew – guitars (tracks 1, 3, 8, 10, 12), Drill guitar (track 5), acoustic guitar and rattlesnake (track 6)
- Justin Meldal-Johnsen – bass guitar tracks 1, 3, 8; "bass painting" tracks 5, 11
- John Philip Shenale – music arrangements and performance (track 2), strings and synths (track 4)
- Jon Evans – bass guitar (tracks 4, 6, 9, 10, 12)
- Dr. Edison Amos, Daniel Bocking, George W. Bush, George H. W. Bush – voices (track 10)
- M & M – additional guitars, string pads (track 6)

== Charts ==
Chart performance for Strange Little Girls
Chart (2001)	Peak position
Australian Albums (ARIA)	7
Austrian Albums (Ö3 Austria)	18
Belgian Albums (Ultratop Flanders)	6
Belgian Albums (Ultratop Wallonia)	24
Canadian Albums (Billboard)	8
Danish Albums (Hitlisten)	16
Dutch Albums (Album Top 100)	27
European Albums (Eurotipsheet)	14
Finnish Albums (Suomen virallinen lista)	16
French Albums (SNEP)	26
German Albums (Offizielle Top 100)	11
Irish Albums (IRMA)	21
Italian Albums (FIMI)	11
Norwegian Albums (VG-lista)	13
Polish Albums (ZPAV)	6
Scottish Albums (Official Charts)	17
Swedish Albums (Sverigetopplistan)	32
Swiss Albums (Schweizer Hitparade)	34
UK Albums (Official Charts)	16
US Billboard 200	4

Chart performance for Strange Little Girls (expanded edition)
Chart (2026)	Peak position
Hungarian Physical Albums (MAHASZ)	17
Scottish Albums (OCC)	74
UK Album Sales (OCC)	63

=== Sales ===
Region	Certification	Certified units/sales
United States	—	395,000

== See also ==
- Male, a 2015 album by Natalie Imbruglia with a similar concept
