= Winter (Tori Amos song) =

1992 single by Tori Amos

- US CD maxi-single

Single by Tori Amos

from the album Little Earthquakes
- B-side: "The Pool"; "Take to the Sky"; "Sweet Dreams"; "Angie"; "Thank You"; "Upside Down"; "Smells Like Teen Spirit"
- Released: March 9, 1992
- Genre: Chamber pop
- Length: 5:40
- Label: Atlantic; EastWest
- Songwriter: Tori Amos
- Producer: Davitt Sigerson

Tori Amos singles chronology
"China" (1992)	"Winter" (1992)	"Crucify" (1992)

"Winter" is a song by American singer-songwriter and pianist Tori Amos, released as a single in March 1992. "Winter" was Amos' first single to reach the top 40 in any country, peaking at number 25 in the United Kingdom two weeks after its release.

== Release ==
"Winter" was the fourth single released from Amos' debut studio album, Little Earthquakes. It was released through EastWest Records on March 9, 1992, in the United Kingdom and on May 18, 1992, in Australia. In North America, it was issued through Atlantic Records the same year. The song also appears on Amos' 2003 compilation, Tales of a Librarian. The music video can be seen on the video collections Tori Amos: Complete Videos 1991–1998 and Fade to Red.

The single was released globally in a variety of formats with slightly differing artwork and track listings. The most commonly available version is the United States release, which is labeled as a "limited edition" release. That version comes in a digipak case with a compartment in which a "handwritten lyrics" insert is contained. The far more rare UK limited edition release features three cover versions that would later appear on the US Crucify EP.

== Reception ==
"Winter" is widely regarded as one of Amos's best songs. In 2014, Stereogum ranked the song number two on their list of the 10 greatest Tori Amos songs, and in 2023, The Guardian ranked the song number four on their list of the 20 greatest Tori Amos songs. The song has placed on the Dutch Top 2000 songs of all time countdown every year since 2015, peaking at No. 765 in 2017.

Professional wrestler Mick Foley penned an essay for Slate about how the song "changed his life"; he listened to it before a bout with Terry Funk on the IWA Japan tour in Tokyo to relieve his stress.

== Track listings ==
UK CD single

1. "Winter" – 5:44
2. "The Pool" – 2:51
3. "Take to the Sky" – 4:20
4. "Sweet Dreams" – 3:27

UK and German limited edition CD single

1. "Winter" – 5:44
2. "Angie" (Mick Jagger, Keith Richards) – 4:25
3. "Smells Like Teen Spirit" (Kurt Cobain, Krist Novoselic, Dave Grohl) – 3:17
4. "Thank You" (Robert Plant, Jimmy Page) – 3:52

German CD single

1. "Winter" – 5:44
2. "The Pool" – 2:51
3. "Smells Like Teen Spirit" – 3:15

Australian CD single and cassette single

1. "Winter" – 5:44
2. "Smells Like Teen Spirit" – 3:15
3. "Angie" – 4:22

UK 7-inch and cassette single

1. "Winter" – 5:44
2. "The Pool" – 2:50

US CD single

1. "Winter" – 5:44
2. "The Pool" – 2:50
3. "Take to the Sky" – 4:20
4. "Sweet Dreams" – 3:27
5. "Upside Down" – 4:22

US 7-inch and cassette single

1. "Winter" (edit) – 4:38
2. "The Pool" – 2:50

== Charts ==
Chart (1992)	Peak position
Australia (ARIA)	49
Europe (Eurochart Hot 100)	76
UK Singles (OCC)	25

== Release history ==
Region	Date	Format(s)	Label(s)	Ref.
United Kingdom	March 9, 1992	7-inch vinyl; CD; cassette	EastWest	
Australia	May 18, 1992	CD; cassette	EastWest	

== Cover versions ==
- Michael Stipe of R.E.M. has included lines of the song in live performances, most notably in 1995.
- Dream Theater have covered "Winter" on at least one occasion, as can be heard on the bootleg of their "Uncovered" gig at Ronnie Scott's in January 1995.
- Amanda Palmer has covered the song live.
- Valen Hsu has covered the song in Mandarin, on her 1995 debut album "Ingratiate (討好)"
- Colin Doran of Hundred Reasons and The Lucky Nine was known to sing "Winter" during soundcheck for live performances.
- Sarah Dawn Finer covered the song in Swedish, as Vinter, on her 2014 album Vinterland. The translated lyrics tell a similar story to the original but include localised references in the verses, such as to ice skating on a frozen river in Stockholm.
- Nathan Temby covered the song on his 2012 album, "Last Call".
