= Christmastide (EP) =

EP by Tori Amos
- Released: December 4, 2020
- Recorded: 2020
- Studio: Martian Engineering (Cornwall, England)
- Genre: Christmas
- Length: 16:35
- Label: Decca
- Producer: Tori Amos

Tori Amos chronology
Native Invader (2017)	Christmastide (2020)	Ocean to Ocean (2021)

Singles from Christmastide
- 1. "Better Angels" Released: November 25, 2020

Christmastide is an extended play by American singer-songwriter and pianist Tori Amos. Released on December 4, 2020, it is her second release to feature holiday-themed material after 2009's Midwinter Graces, and the first of which to contain exclusively original material.

"Better Angels" was released as a single preceding the EP on November 25, 2020.

== Background and release ==
On the EP, Amos stated:

With Christmastide it was important to be positive and to try and lift people's spirits. It's a time of year that should be joyful with family and friends but also can sadly be a very lonely place for some. Many families will be unable to be together this year because of the Pandemic as well as many that are also dealing with the aftermath of a long and bitter U.S. Election. I hope these songs contained in this beautiful package can be a small treat to help along the way. We will get through these tough times together with strength in unity and hope.

The album was released to streaming, as a digital download, and on vinyl, with cover artwork by graphic artist Rantz Hoseley. While it did not chart on the US Billboard 200, it did reach number 79 on the Top Current Album Sales chart.

== Reception ==
Professional ratings
Review scores
Source	Rating
Beats Per Minute	70%
Financial Times	5/5 stars

The EP received generally positive reviews from music critics, including a five-star score from the Financial Times.

== Track listing ==
All songs written by Tori Amos.

Side one
No.	Title	Length
1.	"Christmastide"	3:45
2.	"Circle of Seasons"	5:11

Side two
No.	Title	Length
1.	"Holly"	3:39
2.	"Better Angels"	4:00

== Personnel ==
- Tori Amos – Bösendorfer piano, keyboards, vocals
- Matt Chamberlain – drums, percussion
- Jon Evans – bass guitar, upright bass
- Mac Aladdin – guitar
- Tash – additional vocals (track 1)

== Charts ==
Chart performance for Christmastide
Chart (2020)	Peak position
US Top Current Albums (Billboard)	79
UK Singles Sales (OCC)	34
UK Singles Downloads (OCC)	58
UK Physical Singles (OCC)	2
UK Vinyl Singles (OCC)	2
