= China (Tori Amos song) =

1992 single by Tori Amos

Single by Tori Amos

from the album Little Earthquakes
- B-side: "Sugar"; "Flying Dutchman"; "Humpty Dumpty"
- Released: January 20, 1992
- Genre: Chamber pop
- Length: 5:01
- Label: EastWest
- Songwriter: Tori Amos
- Producer: Ian Stanley

Tori Amos singles chronology
"Silent All These Years" (1991)	"China" (1992)	"Winter" (1992)

"China" is a song by American singer-songwriter and pianist Tori Amos, released as the third single from her debut studio album, Little Earthquakes. It was issued on January 20, 1992, by EastWest Records in the United Kingdom. It was the first song written for Little Earthquakes and was originally titled "Distance"; a recurring lyric and theme in the song. It was originally submitted to the Library of Congress in 1987.

== Background ==
The song is often cited as one of Amos's least abstruse and most traditional ballads. It is a lament about lost love with lyrics like, "Sometimes I think you want me to touch you/How can I when you build the great wall around you?" This particular lyric likely inspired the cover art of Amos standing at an upside-down teacup shaped wall. This visual theme also occurred in the music video, which showed Amos lamenting on a rocky beach in England.

The single peaked at number 51 in the UK but did not chart in other countries. One of the B-sides on the single, "Humpty Dumpty", is exclusive to this release. The B-side, "Sugar", was included on the Australian B-sides album, More Pink: The B-Sides, in 1994 and a live version appeared on the single, Hey Jupiter, in 1996. A live version of "Sugar" also appears on the live disc to Amos' 1999 2-CD album, To Venus and Back. Amos recalls that during the creation of Under The Pink, she considered re-recording the song to put it on the album, but it was later deemed unnecessary because she had enough new material to work with.

== Track listings ==
U.K. Cassette single – Atlantic A7531C / U.K. 7-inch single – Atlantic A7531

1. "China" – 5:01
2. "Sugar" – 4:27

U.K. CD single – Atlantic A7531CD / U.K. 12-inch single – Atlantic A7531T

1. "China" – 5:01
2. "Sugar" – 4:27
3. "Flying Dutchman" – 6:31
4. "Humpty Dumpty" – 2:52

France Cassette single – Carrere Music 7567-85755-4 / France CD single – Carrere Music 7567-85755-9

1. "China" (Edit) – 3:55
2. "Flying Dutchman" – 6:31

== Charts ==
Chart (1992)	Peak position
UK Singles (OCC)	51
