= Hey Jupiter =

1996 song by Tori Amos

- Hey Jupiter U.S. EP cover

Single by Tori Amos

from the album Boys for Pele
- Released: July 22, 1996
- Studio: A church (Delgany, Ireland); A Georgian house (County Cork, Ireland)
- Length: 6:03
- Label: Atlantic (US); EastWest (international)
- Songwriter: Tori Amos
- Producer: Ian Stanley

Tori Amos singles chronology
"Professional Widow" (1996)	"Hey Jupiter" (1996)	"In the Springtime of His Voodoo" (1996)

Tori Amos EP chronology
Crucify (1992)	Hey Jupiter (1996)	Scarlet's Hidden Treasures (2004)

"Hey Jupiter" is a song written and performed by American singer-songwriter and pianist Tori Amos. It was released as the fourth single from her third studio album, Boys for Pele (1996), and was her first extended play (EP) since Crucify in 1992. The U.S. EP Hey Jupiter features a re-recorded version of "Hey Jupiter" followed by four live tracks recorded during her Dew Drop Inn Tour of 1996. The song is also featured on the double A-side CD singles released in the UK and Australia.

Live versions can be found on the U.S. "Bliss" single in 1999, the London show of her The Original Bootlegs series (2005), and the 27 shows part of the Legs and Boots series, released over 2007 and 2008. The music video is on the collection Fade to Red and was released in 2006.

== The Dakota version ==
The version released on all but the UK 12-inch vinyl single, entitled "Hey Jupiter (The Dakota Version)", differs substantially from the version that appears on Boys for Pele in that it is a full re-recording rather than a remix. While the studio album version is largely a piano solo track, the Dakota version adds many more layers including bass, guitars, and a rhythm track taken from the earlier B-side track "Sugar" (though slowed down). Lyrically, new bridges and an extended coda are added, making the song even longer despite the fact that the third verse from the album version is omitted. The Dakota version also emphasises the song's chordal similarity to Prince's power ballad "Purple Rain," which also features an extended instrumental coda. The UK 12-inch vinyl single version also differs from the Boys for Pele version in that it contains a radio edit of the Dakota version.

The Dakota version has been performed on each of Amos' tours since the Dew Drop Inn Tour (1996). Traditionally, Amos performs the album version when on solo piano, although the Dakota version was performed on the vast majority of nights of the American Doll Posse world tour. A remaster of the Dakota version is included on the anthology box set A Piano: The Collection.

== Critical reception ==
Daina Darzin from Cash Box wrote, "With her Boys for Pele disc double platinum and counting, Tori Amos has firmly established herself in the pantheon of quirky, smart female vocalists right alongside Alanis Morissette. This is an atmospheric, edgy ballad, at once ethereal and dark, buoyed by Amos' evocative, emotion-laden voice. An instant-add on a number of formats including CHR, Adult Contemporary and Modern Rock." Kevin Courtney from Irish Times viewed it as "a plangent ballad which never spins out of orbit".

== Sales and chart performance ==
The US EP Hey Jupiter debuted at number 94, its peak, on the Billboard 200 on September 7, 1996; it remained on the chart for three weeks before falling off. As of May 2008, 12 years after its release, the Hey Jupiter EP had sold 172,000 copies in the US, according to Nielsen SoundScan. The "Hey Jupiter/Professional Widow" double A-side single release peaked at number 20 on the UK Singles Chart. The Australian double A-side release debuted at number 68 on the ARIA Singles Chart in October 1996 and peaked at number 17 in February 1997, maintaining its peak position for three weeks. The double A-side single remained on the chart for 31 weeks throughout 1996 and 1997, ranking at number 65 on the Australian year-end chart for 1997.

== Music video ==
The accompanying music video for "Hey Jupiter" was directed by Earle Sebastian who has worked with Bono, Madonna, the Fugees, Missy Elliott, and others. The video is set to the Dakota version radio edit, as opposed to the extended Dakota or the Boys for Pele versions of the song.

The video features Amos being guided through a burning building by a small girl. According to Amos in the audio commentary provided with the video collection Fade to Red (2006), the small girl represents an angel who is "taking her to a different dimension, another reality."

Amos describes the spectators watching the event: "...this women that they knew, some knew better than others, is in a fire. If you see it as an emotional fire, well, maybe it's someone who can't get out of a relationship or an addiction or another type of situation. But, you know, there's nothing you can do but watch them burn. And, that's really how I saw it poetically."

== Track listings ==
All tracks are written by Tori Amos, except where noted.

US EP
No.	Title	Writer(s)	Length
1.	"Hey Jupiter" (The Dakota version)		6:03
2.	"Sugar" (live)		5:33
3.	"Honey" (live)		4:19
4.	"Professional Widow" (Merry Widow version live)		4:38
5.	"Somewhere Over the Rainbow" (live)	Harold Arlen, Edgar Yipsel Harburg	4:31
Total length:			25:14

UK and Australian CD single
No.	Title	Length
1.	"Hey Jupiter" (The Dakota version)	6:03
2.	"Professional Widow" (Armand's Star Trunk Funkin' mix radio edit)	3:45
3.	"Sugar" (live)	5:43
4.	"Honey" (live)	4:19
Total length:		19:50

UK 12-inch single
No.	Title	Length
1.	"Professional Widow" (Armand's Star Trunk Funkin' mix)	8:08
2.	"Hey Jupiter" (The Dakota version radio edit)	4:14
3.	"Talula" (BT's Synethasia mix)	11:27
Total length:		23:49

UK cassette single
No.	Title	Length
1.	"Hey Jupiter" (The Dakota version)	6:03
2.	"Professional Widow" (Armand's Star Trunk Funkin' mix radio edit)	3:45
Total length:		9:48

== Credits and personnel ==
The credits listing is from the Boys for Pele album booklet.

Recording and production

- Recorded at a church (Delgany, Ireland) and "a wonderfully damp Georgian house" (County Cork, Ireland)
- Additionally recorded at The Egyptian Room and Dinosaur Studios (New Orleans, Louisiana)
- Mixed at Jacobs Studios (Surrey, England), Mix This!, and Record One (Los Angeles)
- Mastered at Gateway Mastering (Portland, Maine)

Personnel

- Tori Amos – writing, vocals, Bösendorfer, Harmonium organ, production
- Steve Caton – electric guitar, mandolin
- Mark Hawley – recording, mixing
- Marcel van Limbeek – recording, mixing
- Rob van Tuin – recording assistant, mixing assistant
- Bob Ludwig – mastering

== Charts ==
=== Weekly charts ===
"Hey Jupiter" / "Professional Widow"

Chart (1996–1997)	Peak position
Australia (ARIA)	17
Belgium (Ultratop 50 Flanders)	22
Belgium (Ultratop 50 Wallonia)	22
Europe (Eurochart Hot 100)	54
Italy (Musica e dischi)	2
Scotland Singles (Official Charts)	24
UK Singles (Official Charts)	20
UK Dance (Official Charts)	1

Hey Jupiter EP

Chart (1996)	Peak position
US Billboard 200	94

=== Year-end charts ===
Chart (1997)	Position
Australia (ARIA)	65

== Certifications ==
Region	Certification	Certified units/sales
Australia (ARIA)	Gold	35,000^{^}
^{^} Shipments figures based on certification alone.

== Release history ==
Region	Version	Date	Format(s)	Label(s)	Ref.
United Kingdom	"Hey Jupiter" / "Professional Widow"	July 22, 1996	12-inch vinyl; CD; cassette	EastWest	
United States	Hey Jupiter EP	August 20, 1996	CD	Atlantic	
