= A Sorta Fairytale =

2002 single by Tori Amos

Single by Tori Amos

from the album Scarlet's Walk
- B-side: "Operation Peter Pan"
- Released: October 15, 2002
- Recorded: 2002
- Studio: Martian Engineering (Cornwall)
- Genre: Soft rock; art pop
- Length: 5:30 (album version); 4:01 (single version)
- Label: Epic; Sony BMG
- Songwriter: Tori Amos

Tori Amos singles chronology
| "Concertina" (2000) | "A Sorta Fairytale" (2002) | "Taxi Ride" (2003) |

A Sorta Fairytale

Video by Tori Amos
- Released: 8 April 2003
- Genres: Rock; pop
- Length: 25:00
- Label: Sony Music Video
- Director: Sanji

Tori Amos chronology
| Tori Amos: Complete Videos 1991–1998 (1998) | A Sorta Fairytale (2003) | Welcome to Sunny Florida (2004) |

"A Sorta Fairytale" is a song written and performed by American singer-songwriter and pianist Tori Amos. It was released as the first single from her seventh studio album Scarlet's Walk (2002). The song reached No. 14 on the U.S. Billboard Bubbling Under Hot 100 Singles chart, and number two on the Triple A (adult album alternative) chart. The song has since been featured in episodes of the television shows Nip/Tuck and The L Word. There are three commercially released versions of the song: the album version (5:30), the 101 Mix (4:00) and the original single version (4:01). It was released as a CD single (UK/Canada) with "Operation Peter Pan" as the B-side (which marked her final B-side to date), and as a DVD single (U.S.) with the music video, co-starring actor and visual artist Adrien Brody.

== Song information ==
From the promotional CD Scarlet Stories:

I think that there is a place where she [Scarlet] realizes that people come in and out of your life. Sometimes for a day, sometimes for longer. And all of them make you what you are. You can't separate these people out of you. They form who you are. Even the ones that you kind of say well... you know, I don't know if I wanna be formed by them anymore. (laughs) But you are in some way. You are. That's why, maybe, you don't have to look at them so harshly because they have affected you. At the end, though, you know... it's us as individuals with our... mm... with our love for the land. For something intangible, that when soulmates come and go, you're never alone even when you're standing just you in your shoes, because you carry them with you.

"A Sorta Fairytale" finds Scarlet back in LA with a man she has convinced herself is her life's soul mate.

They take the big trip in the classic car up the Pacific Coast highway and across the desert. But as they go on, the masks drop away and they discover the fantasy they have of each other isn't who they really are.

They end up back where they started and Scarlet leaves.

They did care. But somehow they lost each other. Which is why it's only "A Sorta Fairytale." - [Scarlet's Walk bio]

In a 2009 interview, Amos was asked about the meaning of one of the lines:

Interviewer: I have to ask you this because it's been killing me for the past five years. On the song A Sorta Fairytale ... you sing about pulling back the hood. Are you talking about the hood I think you're talking about?

Amos: Oh, I want you to think whatever you want to think.

Interviewer: That is not an answer!

Amos: I want you to take it there! I want you to take it there!

Interviewer: Because then when you sing about tasting heaven perfectly—

Amos: And my mom thinks it's talking about a convertible! And you know what? Let's just let her think that.

== Reception ==
"A Sorta Fairytale" is widely regarded as one of Amos's best songs. In 2014, Stereogum ranked the song number five on their list of the 10 greatest Tori Amos songs, and in 2023, The Guardian ranked the song number six on their list of the 20 greatest Tori Amos songs.

On its initial release in 2002, Music Week described the single as "a typically emotional and touching ballad" that will "please her fanbase".

== Music video ==
The music video, directed by Sanji, features Amos, as a head attached to a disembodied leg, falling in love with another head attached to a disembodied arm (played by Adrien Brody). The two creatures show signs of romantic interest in one another, until the arm accidentally hurts the leg's feelings by laughing at her crooked fifth toe. The leg then flees by jumping onto a passing skateboard, and ends up alone on a deserted beach. The arm finds her and they consummate their love with a deep kiss. The act of kissing causes the arm and leg to suddenly start swelling up and grow their extra body parts—they finally become complete, "whole" humans by realizing their love.

== Track listing ==
=== Maxi-CD single (UK and Canada) ===
1. "A Sorta Fairytale" (101 Mix)
2. "Operation Peter Pan"
3. "A Sorta Fairytale" (original single version)*
4. "A Scarlet Story" (Enhanced CD multimedia)

=== 7" single (US) ===
1. "A Sorta Fairytale" (single version)* (on both sides)

*The "single version" and "original single version" are identical though titled differently. Issued with a picture sleeve. Disc has small center hole

=== DVD single (US) ===
1. "A Sorta Fairytale" music video (digitally mastered)
2. Tori Amos biography
3. Making of "A Sorta Fairytale"
4. Interview segment (with Amos)

== Charts ==
=== Weekly charts ===
Weekly chart performance for "A Sorta Fairytale"
| Chart (2002–03) | Peak position |
|---|---|
| Canada (Nielsen SoundScan) | 6 |
| Germany (GfK) | 98 |
| Italy (Italian Singles Chart) | 48 |
| UK Singles (Official Charts) | 41 |
| US Bubbling Under Hot 100 (Billboard) | 14 |
| US Adult Alternative Airplay (Billboard) | 2 |
| US Adult Pop Airplay (Billboard) | 11 |
| US Hot Singles Sales | 9 |
| Europe (Eurochart Hot 100) | 95 |
| Scottish Singles Sales (Official Charts) | 45 |

=== Year-end charts ===
Year-end chart performance for "A Sorta Fairytale" by Tori Amos
| Chart (2002) | Position |
|---|---|
| Canada (Nielsen SoundScan) | 40 |
