= Little Earthquakes =

Studio album by Tori Amos
- Released: January 6, 1992
- Recorded: 1990–1991
- Studios: Capitol Studios (Los Angeles, California); Stag Studios (Witham, UK)
- Length: 57:11
- Labels: Atlantic (US); East West (Europe)
- Producers: Tori Amos; Eric Rosse; Davitt Sigerson; Ian Stanley

Tori Amos chronology
Y Kant Tori Read (1988)	Little Earthquakes (1992)	Under the Pink (1994)

Singles from Little Earthquakes
- 1. "Me and a Gun" Released: October 21, 1991; 2. "Silent All These Years" Released: November 18, 1991; 3. "China" Released: January 20, 1992; 4. "Winter" Released: March 9, 1992; 5. "Crucify" Released: May 12, 1992

Little Earthquakes is the debut solo album by the American singer-songwriter and pianist Tori Amos, featuring the singles "Silent All These Years", "China", "Winter" and "Crucify". After Atlantic Records rejected the first version of the album, Amos began working on a second version with her then-boyfriend Eric Rosse. The album was first released in the UK on January 6, 1992, where it peaked at number 14 in the charts. The US release followed on February 25, 1992.

It was well received by critics and listeners. In the US, the album reached the top 60 of the Billboard 200. It is frequently regarded as one of the greatest albums of all time; it was voted number 73 in Colin Larkin's All Time Top 1000 Albums and ranked number 233 on Rolling Stone's 500 greatest albums of all time.

== Recording ==
Following the dissolution of her synth-pop band Y Kant Tori Read, Amos composed 12 songs, recorded them at Capitol Studios in Los Angeles with Davitt Sigerson producing, and in June 1990 submitted them for copyright.

Amos approached Atlantic Records in December 1990 with a 10-track demo tape, some being newer songs but mostly ones from June. The track listing consisted of "Russia" (later to become "Take to the Sky"), "Mary", "Crucify", "Happy Phantom", "Leather", "Winter", "Sweet Dreams", "Song for Eric", "Learn to Fly" and "Flying Dutchman". Atlantic was unhappy with the songs, and in response Amos and her then boyfriend Eric Rosse recorded some new songs, including "Girl", "Precious Things", "Tear in Your Hand", "Mother" and "Little Earthquakes". The song "Take Me with You" was recorded during these sessions, but not released until 2006 (with re-recorded vocals). This session was recorded on a limited budget in Rosse's home studio, using his 3M 24-track analog tape machine and a Yamaha CP-80 piano. Amos and Rosse also went to Stag Studios to use a Yamaha grand piano. Satisfied with these recordings, Atlantic determined that the album Little Earthquakes would have 13 tracks, removing "Learn to Fly" and adding four from the December recording session.

Amos moved to London to work with Ian Stanley (formerly of Tears for Fears); Atlantic thought Amos would have an easier time of achieving success in the United Kingdom, because of that market's appreciation for eccentric performers. Here she recorded what would become two of her early singles. "Me and a Gun" was the last song written for the album, while "China" was an early track, originally titled "Distance", that she wrote in 1987.

The second final version of the album was accepted by the record company. However, this was still revised before the final release; a 13-track promo cassette shows that the song "Little Earthquakes" was to appear after "Happy Phantom" on side one, with side two closing with "Flying Dutchman". The latter track was presumably dropped due to the physical restraints of the vinyl LP format.

Atlantic's European counterpart, East West, promoted the record extensively. Amos spent much of 1991 performing in small bars and clubs in London and playing for music executives and journalists, often in her own apartment. The Me and a Gun EP containing four tracks was released in October 1991, receiving considerable critical attention. The single was re-issued the following month with "Silent All These Years" as the lead composition, and it became her first chart entry in the UK at number 51 following Single of the Week support from BBC Radio 1 and a TV debut on the high-rated chat show of Jonathan Ross on Channel 4. The back cover of the album contains pictures of Phallus impudicus mushrooms, also known as stinkhorns.

== Release ==
When the album was finally released in the UK in January 1992, it reached number 14 and remained on the Top 75 charts (UK Albums Chart) for 23 weeks. A month later, it was released in the United States to breakthrough critical success and also announced itself as a chart mainstay, despite peaking outside the Top 50 on the Billboard 200. The accompanying singles (along with "Me and a Gun" and "Silent All These Years") were "China" (January 1992 UK), "Winter" (March 1992 UK/November 1992 US) and "Crucify" (May 1992 US/June 1992 UK), the US EP version of which featured covers of songs by artists including The Rolling Stones and Nirvana.

== Critical reception ==
Professional ratings
Review scores
Source	Rating
AllMusic	5/5 stars
Christgau's Consumer Guide	C+
Los Angeles Times	3/4 stars
Mojo	4/5 stars
NME	7/10
Pitchfork	8.6/10
Q	4/5 stars
Record Collector	5/5 stars
Rolling Stone	4/5 stars
The Rolling Stone Album Guide	4.5/5 stars

Reviews of Little Earthquakes were generally positive. Los Angeles Times critic Jean Rosenbluth praised it as a considerable improvement over Amos's previous work in Y Kant Tori Read, calling the album "a quixotic, compelling record that mixes the smart sensuality of Kate Bush with the provocative impenetrability of Mary Margaret O'Hara." Josef Woodward of Rolling Stone wrote that "Amos shares common ground with artfolk songstresses like Kate Bush and Jane Siberry" and described her "quivery vibrato-laden holler – akin to Siouxsie Sioux's". The song "Leather" was pictured as a "Kurt Weill-meets-Queen cabaret act". He described the album as "an often pretty, subtly progressive song cycle that reflects darkly on sexual alienation and personal struggles", and that by the end of the album "we feel as though we've been through some peculiar therapy session, half-cleansed and half-stirred. That artful paradox is part of what makes Little Earthquakes a gripping debut." His original rating of three and a half stars out of five in the 1992 print version of the magazine was later rounded up to four stars out of five on Rolling Stone's website.

Among negative assessments, Stephanie Zacharek commented in Entertainment Weekly that Amos's songs "are too self-consciously weird" to be enjoyable, while The Village Voice's Robert Christgau praised only "Me and a Gun", disregarding the other songs as lesser versions of Kate Bush.

In the United Kingdom, where Amos was first promoted, the album was also warmly received. Jon Wilde of Melody Maker stated that Amos "possesses a rare ability to explore a multiplicity of emotions and a broad range of perspectives within the same song", describing the album's songs as "cerebral soul music for the kind of people who mean to read TE Lawrence's Seven Pillars of Wisdom on their holidays but end up spending all their time exchanging bodily fluids with strangers." In Q, John Aizlewood wrote that "Guilt, misery and failed relationships thread their way through Little Earthquakes with occasional detours for childhood traumas transformed into adult inadequacies" and praised Amos's lyrics, concluding: "Little Earthquakes is disturbing, funny and sexy by turns. Amos does all this with the unmistakable stamp of a potentially great songwriter. Where on earth can she go from here?" Roger Morton of NME was more reserved in his praise, summarizing Little Earthquakes as "a sprawling, confusing journey through the gunk of a woman's soul ... Sometimes it's magical and sometimes it's sickly and overwrought".

=== Legacy ===
In 1998, Q readers voted Little Earthquakes the 66th greatest album of all time, and in 2002 the same magazine named it the fourth greatest album of all time by a female artist. It was also voted number 73 in the third edition of Colin Larkin's All Time Top 1000 Albums in 2000, and was ranked number 233 in the 2020 version of Rolling Stone's "500 Greatest Albums of All Time" list. Little Earthquakes was included in the book 1001 Albums You Must Hear Before You Die.

In a retrospective review, AllMusic critic Steve Huey said that Amos "carved the template for the female singer/songwriter movement of the '90s" with Little Earthquakes, and that while "her subsequent albums were often very strong, Amos would never bare her soul quite so directly (or comprehensibly) as she did here, nor with such consistently focused results." Slant Magazine's Sal Cinquemani deemed it Amos's most focused and accessible recording, which "almost immediately sparked cult interest in the singer, and has, over time, undoubtedly become a soundtrack (at least in part) to the lives of many anguished teens and adults." Slant also included it on their 2003 list of 50 Essential Pop Albums.

Reviewing the album's 2015 remastered edition for Rolling Stone, Jessica Machado wrote that "the pop charts had never heard a female voice quite like the one on Little Earthquakes, from the sharp mix of desire and frustration in 'Precious Things' ... to the raw pain in ... 'Me and a Gun'", while in Record Collector, Nicola Rayner noted how Amos's piano-based music stood out amid the rise of the guitar-oriented grunge and Britpop scenes in the early 1990s. Mojo's John Bungey said that the "remarkable, idiosyncratic" album showcased "a singular creative force from the outset"; according to Alex Ramon of PopMatters, it established the "cryptic exhortations, poetic imagery, surrealist wit and brutal directness" that would define Amos's subsequent work. Barry Walters remarked on the lasting influence of Little Earthquakes and its 1994 follow-up Under the Pink in his review for Pitchfork, citing various acts who "all wear their sensitivities as strengths as she did." "With its lack of standard rock and pop clichés of the day and reliance on acoustic piano and an excellent (if unconventional) voice," wrote J. C. Maçek III of Spectrum Culture, "Little Earthquakes sounds as unique today as it did in 1992."

In a roundtable interview with The Hollywood Reporter, singer Justin Timberlake expressed his immense admiration for Little Earthquakes. Timberlake said, "That album changed my life. So [expletive] good."

Tori Amos: Little Earthquakes, an official graphic novel celebrating the album's 30th anniversary, was published by Z2 Comics in 2022 – contributors included Amos, Neil Gaiman, Margaret Atwood, Marc Andreyko, Annie Zaleski, Derek McCulloch, Leah Moore, Kelly Sue DeConnick, Neil Kleid, Lar DeSouza, Colleen Doran, and David W. Mack. The book was edited by Amos's friend Rantz Hoseley, who edited a previous graphic novel inspired by Amos's music, Comic Book Tattoo (Image Comics, 2008).

== Track listing ==
=== Original release (1992) ===
All tracks are written by Tori Amos.

Little Earthquakes track listing
No.	Title	Producer(s)	Length
1.	"Crucify"	Davitt Sigerson	4:58
2.	"Girl"	Amos; Eric Rosse	4:06
3.	"Silent All These Years"	Sigerson	4:10
4.	"Precious Things"	Amos; Rosse	4:26
5.	"Winter"	Sigerson	5:40
6.	"Happy Phantom"	Sigerson	3:12
7.	"China"	Ian Stanley	4:58
8.	"Leather"	Sigerson	3:12
9.	"Mother"	Sigerson	6:59
10.	"Tear in Your Hand"	Amos; Rosse	4:38
11.	"Me and a Gun"	Stanley (recorded by)	3:44
12.	"Little Earthquakes"	Amos; Rosse	6:51
Total length:			57:11

=== Deluxe edition (2015) ===
The 2015 double-CD reissue of the album included a second disc containing thirteen b-sides and five live performances that had previously been released on the CD singles for the album in 1991 and 1992. This release, however, did not include the covers of "Angie" by The Rolling Stones and "Thank You" by Led Zeppelin, which were released as b-sides to "Winter" in the United Kingdom and "Crucify" in the United States.

All tracks are written by Tori Amos, except "Smells Like Teen Spirit" written by Kurt Cobain, Krist Novoselic and Dave Grohl. "Humpty Dumpty" is based on the traditional nursery rhyme.

2015 deluxe edition disc 2 track listing
No.	Title	Producer(s)	Length
1.	"Upside Down" (B-side to "Me and a Gun")	Davitt Sigerson	4:22
2.	"Thoughts" (B-side to "Me and a Gun")	Amos; Eric Rosse	2:36
3.	"Ode to the Banana King (Part One)" (B-side to "Silent All These Years")	Ian Stanley	4:06
4.	"Song for Eric" (B-side to "Silent All These Years")	Stanley	1:50
5.	"The Pool" (B-side to "Winter")	Stanley	2:51
6.	"Take to the Sky" (B-side to "Winter")	Rosse	4:20
7.	"Sweet Dreams" (B-side to "Winter")	Sigerson	3:27
8.	"Mary" (B-side to "Crucify")	Sigerson	4:27
9.	"Sugar" (B-side to "China")	Stanley	4:27
10.	"Flying Dutchman" (B-side to "China")	Sigerson	6:31
11.	"Humpty Dumpty" (B-side to "China")	Stanley	2:52
12.	"Smells Like Teen Spirit" (B-side to "Crucify")	Stanley	3:17
13.	"Little Earthquakes" (live from Cambridge Corn Exchange, April 5, 1992)	Stanley	6:58
14.	"Crucify" (live from Cambridge Corn Exchange, April 5, 1992)	Stanley	5:19
15.	"Precious Things" (live from Cambridge Corn Exchange, April 5, 1992)	Stanley	5:03
16.	"Mother" (live from Cambridge Corn Exchange, April 5, 1992)	Stanley	6:37
17.	"Happy Phantom" (live from Cambridge Corn Exchange, April 5, 1992)	Stanley	3:33
18.	"Here. In My Head" (B-side to "Crucify")	Stanley	3:53

== Personnel ==
- Tori Amos – acoustic piano, keyboard, lead vocals (all tracks), background vocals (tracks: 2, 3, 4, 6, 10, 12), sampled strings (tracks: 2, 8)
- Steve Caton – guitar (tracks: 2, 4, 10, 12), bass (track 2), background vocals (tracks: 4, 12)
- John Chamberlain – mandolin (track 1)
- Paulinho da Costa – percussion (tracks: 1, 6)
- Jake Freeze – rat pedal (track 4), saw (track 12)
- Stuart Gordon – violin (track 7)
- Ed Greene – drums (track 1)
- Will Gregory – oboe (track 7)
- Tina Gullickson – background vocals (track 1)
- Chris Hughes – drums (track 7)
- David Lord – string arrangement (track 7)
- Will McGregor – bass (tracks: 4, 10, 12)
- Carlo Nuccio – drums (tracks: 4, 10)
- Philly – finger cymbal (track 3)
- David Rhodes – guitar (track 7)
- Eric Rosse – drum and keyboard programming (tracks: 2, 4, 12), background vocals (tracks: 4, 12), Irish war drum (track 5)
- Jef Scott – bass (tracks: 1, 8)
- Matthew Seligman – bass (track 7)
- Nancy Shanks – background vocals (tracks: 1, 12)
- Phil Shenale – keyboard programming (track 6)
- Eric Williams – ukulele (track 1), dulcimer (track 6)
- Orchestra arranged and conducted by Nick DeCaro (tracks: 3, 5)

== Charts ==
Chart performance for Little Earthquakes
Chart (1992–2001)	Peak position
Australian Albums (ARIA)	14
Canadian Albums (Billboard)	49
German Albums (Offizielle Top 100)	65
Dutch Albums (Album Top 100)	85
New Zealand Albums (RMNZ)	18
Scottish Albums (Official Charts)	73
UK Albums (Official Charts)	14
US Billboard 200	54
US Cash Box Top 200 Albums	45
European Albums (Eurotipsheet)	26

Chart performance for Little Earthquakes (2015 deluxe edition)
Chart (2015)	Peak position
Belgian Albums (Ultratop Flanders)	106
Dutch Albums (Album Top 100)	71
UK Album Sales (OCC)	78
UK Physical Albums (OCC)	58

Chart performance for Little Earthquakes (2023 reissue)
Chart (2023)	Peak position
Hungarian Albums (MAHASZ)	13
Scottish Albums (OCC)	73
UK Album Sales (OCC)	62
UK Physical Albums (OCC)	59

== Certifications ==
Region	Certification	Certified units/sales
Australia (ARIA)	Gold	35,000^{^}
Belgium (BRMA)	Gold	25,000^{*}
Canada (Music Canada)	Gold	50,000^{^}
Netherlands (NVPI)	Gold	50,000^{^}
United Kingdom (BPI)	Gold	100,000^{^}
United States (RIAA)	2× Platinum	2,000,000^{^}
^{*} Sales figures based on certification alone.^{^} Shipments figures based on certification alone.
