= Boys for Pele =

Studio album by Tori Amos
- Released: January 22, 1996
- Recorded: June – October 1995
- Studios: Christ Church (Delgany, County Wicklow, Ireland); Georgian house (County Cork, Ireland) (principal recording); The Egyptian Room (New Orleans, Louisiana); Dinosaur Studios (New Orleans, Louisiana); AIR Studios (London) (additional recording)
- Genres: Baroque pop; alternative rock; art pop
- Length: 70:32
- Labels: Atlantic (US); East West (Europe)
- Producer: Tori Amos

Tori Amos chronology
Under the Pink (1994)	Boys for Pele (1996)	From the Choirgirl Hotel (1998)

Singles from Boys for Pele
- 1. "Caught a Lite Sneeze" Released: January 2, 1996; 2. "Talula" Released: March 11, 1996 (UK); 3. "Professional Widow" Released: July 2, 1996 (US); 4. "Hey Jupiter" Released: July 22, 1996 (UK); 5. "In the Springtime of His Voodoo" Released: September 24, 1996

Boys for Pele is the third studio album by American singer-songwriter and pianist Tori Amos. Preceded by the first single, "Caught a Lite Sneeze", by three weeks, the album was released on January 22, 1996, in the United Kingdom, on January 23 in the United States, and on January 29 in Australia. Despite the album being Amos's least radio friendly material to date, Boys for Pele debuted at number two on both the US Billboard 200 and the UK Albums Chart, making it her biggest simultaneous transatlantic debut, her first Billboard top-10 debut, and the highest-charting album of her career in the US to date.

Boys for Pele was recorded in rural Ireland and Louisiana and features 18 songs that incorporate harpsichord, clavichord, harmonium, gospel choirs, brass bands and full orchestras. Amos wrote all of the tracks, and for the first time, she served as sole producer for her own album. For Amos, the album was a step into a different direction, in terms of singing, songwriting, and recording, and is experimental in comparison to her previous work.

== Background ==
During the recording of her previous album, Under the Pink (1994), Amos's longtime professional and romantic relationship with Eric Rosse, who co-produced a considerable amount of her pre-Pele work, disintegrated. That loss, combined with a few subsequent encounters with men during the Under the Pink promotional tour, forced Amos to re-evaluate her relationship with men and masculinity. Amos explained, "In my relationships with men, I was always musician enough, but not woman enough, I always met men in my life as a musician, and there would be magic, adoration. But then it would wear off. All of us want to be adored, even for five minutes a day, and nothing these men gave me was ever enough."

Songs began appearing in fragments, often while on stage during the Under the Pink tour. After a trip to Hawaii during which Amos learned about legendary volcano goddess Pele, the album began taking shape; Amos conceived of the songs as representing stealing fire from the men in her life as well as a journey to finding her own fire as a woman. From there, Amos explained, the songs just came. "Sometimes the fury of it would make me step back, I began to live these songs as we separated. The vampire in me came out. You're an emotional vampire, with blood in the corner of your mouth, and you put on matching lipstick so no one knows."

During this time, Amos, who has openly discussed her experiences with psychedelic drugs, particularly in relation to Boys for Pele, did ceremonies with a South American shaman and experienced meeting the devil, leading her to write the track "Father Lucifer."

The album would ultimately consist of 15 full-length songs and four short "interludes". As Amos was finding "parts and pieces of myself that I had never claimed" on this journey, the 14 primary songs represent the number of body parts of the Egyptian god Osiris that his wife, the goddess Isis, had to find to put his body back together in Egyptian mythology. The arrangement of the songs on the album reflects the progression Amos intended to achieve on the double vinyl LP of the album; each of the four sides of the album on vinyl would open with an interlude track that leads into the rest of the three or four songs on each side. The vinyl release is the only version of the album in which the interludes ("Beauty Queen", "Mr. Zebra", "Way Down", and "Agent Orange") are not numbered.

== Production ==
Boys for Pele is Amos' first self-produced album; she would continue producing her own albums ever since. Given that the album deals with the role of women in religion and relationships, and particularly in light of her breakup with Rosse, who had served as producer for her previous two albums, Amos felt that it was appropriate to take complete control over producing Boys for Pele, as a "bid for independence". Of producing the album herself, Amos said, "I was at the point I could not answer to anybody. I'd been answering my whole life to some patriarchal figure."

=== Theme and lyrical content ===
Two underlying currents run through Boys for Pele: exploring the role of women in both patriarchal religion and relationships. Amos had previously written songs in a religious and/or theological context ("Crucify" from Little Earthquakes (1992), "God" from Under the Pink), but her viewpoint takes a particularly feminist slant on this album. "The feminine part of God has been circumcised out of all religions ... God (is) a patriarchal force, a very masculine energy, with the feminine having been subservient, either being the mother, the lover, the virgin, but never the equal, never to have the whole." "Muhammad My Friend", the eighth track on the album, best represents this aspect of the album's theme with the line, "It's time to tell the world/We both know it was a girl back in Bethlehem."

Amos derived the album's title from the Hawaiian volcano goddess, Pele, with the "boys" representing the men in her life. "First I wanted to sacrifice all these guys to the volcano goddess and roast them like marshmallows, then I decided they gave me a really wonderful gift," Amos said of the title. Amos herself has described the album as a novel, as a "story of the descent of a woman to gain her passion and gain her compassion," chronicling a woman's self-discovery in a male-dominated world, looking for fragments of herself and being suppressed. Songs such as "Blood Roses", "Caught a Lite Sneeze", "Hey Jupiter", "Doughnut Song" and "Putting the Damage On" deal directly with the aftermath of a break-up and a woman's reflection on the failed relationship.

"Blood Roses", which Amos had initially intended to serve as the opening track to the album, finds the singer scorned over a failed relationship, belting out lines such as, "can't forget the things you never said" and "I've shaved every place where you've been boy". Regarding "Caught a Lite Sneeze", Amos says, "the whole current is doing anything so that you don't have to face yourself. Nothing is enough"; her previous relationships with men being the song's backbone with lines like, "boys on my left side, boys on my right side, boys in the middle and you're not here, I need a big loan from the girl zone."

=== Recording ===
Amos had initially planned to record the entire album in the American South because "there's a hiddenness about the South, and I wanted to go back there because it was similar to how I felt in my relationships with men," but the bulk of the record was recorded in a church in Delgany, County Wicklow, Ireland, as well as in New Orleans, Louisiana. Given her religious upbringing, Amos was drawn to record in a church, not in anger, but "with the intention of wholeness and of bringing a fragmented woman back to freedom." Amos chose to record the album in a church because it was about searching for an energy current, about claiming the passionate aspect of womanhood that the church teaches is wrong, "the idea of speaking my truth, no censorship, in a place that did not honor anyone's truth unless it was the church's truth," "so I figured if I was going to claim my womanhood, my passion, and sing this record – which, for me, was claiming fragments that I had suppressed for a long time – then I was going to go back to a church, back to the old world, to do it."

Amos' sound engineer came up with the idea of enclosing Amos by herself in a sound-deadening box, so that her normal body movement would not be caught by the microphones surrounding the piano and harpsichord. Only her arms protruded from the box. This technique allowed for more spaciousness in the sound, more of the room acoustics.

== B-sides ==
Title	Length	Single
"Graveyard"	0:56	"Caught a Lite Sneeze" (1996)
"Hungarian Wedding Song"	1:00	"Caught a Lite Sneeze" (1996)
"London Girls"	3:20	"Caught a Lite Sneeze" (1996)
"Samurai"	3:03	"Caught a Lite Sneeze" (1996)
"That's What I Like Mick (The Sandwich Song)"	2:59	"Caught a Lite Sneeze" (1996)
"This Old Man"	1:44	"Caught a Lite Sneeze" (1996)
"Toodles Mr. Jim"	3:09	"Caught a Lite Sneeze" (1996)
"Alamo"	5:11	"Talula" (1996)
"Amazing Grace/Til The Chicken"	6:48	"Talula" (1996)
"Frog on My Toe"	3:40	"Talula" (1996)
"Sister Named Desire"	5:29	"Talula" (1996)

The writing process and recording session for Boys for Pele is one of Amos's most prolific. Between the songs that were included on the album, included as B-sides, and included in later compilations, Amos composed and recorded approximately 35 songs during this time.

The chart displayed here lists only the songs that were released as B-sides on singles from Boys for Pele.

Many songs written and recorded for Boys for Pele were released in conjunction with subsequent albums or have yet to be released. Three such songs, "Cooling", "Never Seen Blue" and "Beulah Land", were recorded for inclusion on Boys for Pele, but were kept off the album, later released as B-sides on the "Spark" (1998) and "Jackie's Strength" (1998) singles.

Other songs were partially written during the Boys for Pele era and finished and released later: "Snow Cherries from France" appears on the Tales of a Librarian (2003) compilation, her final release with Atlantic; "Apollo's Frock" appears on Scarlet's Hidden Treasures (2004); and "Walk to Dublin", which was left off the album after disagreements over the musical structure of the song between Amos and her label, then revisited again during the From the Choirgirl Hotel (1998) recording sessions, was not released until A Piano: The Collection (2006).

Another song, "To the Fair Motormaids of Japan", was also recorded during the Boys for Pele recording sessions. It was released on a deluxe remastered rerelease of the album on November 18, 2016.

The Hey Jupiter EP includes live performances of some of Amos's previously released B-sides, including a cover of "Over the Rainbow", listed as "Somewhere Over the Rainbow". Amos also covered "I'm on Fire", "Landslide", and "Over the Rainbow" on VH1 Crossroads.

== Artwork ==
The album's cover is a photo of Amos holding a large rifle, sitting in a rocking chair on the porch of an old wooden building. One of her legs is out of her pants and flung over the side of the chair. A snake coils around the chair and a large rooster hangs from the roof of the porch. The image is a nod to her song "Me and a Gun," which appears on the album Little Earthquakes and recounts a rape she suffered. "Well, it's [the cover of the album] a reference to 'Me and a Gun', a song I wrote that was on Little Earthquakes. And the idea that there's a dead cock on my right and a live snake on my left. And the idea is that death and life ... creation ... what it's taken me to get here with men, and I don't want to be angry anymore. And you turn it over and you put the gun down, but I'm not pretending what it's taken to get me here. But no more resentment." [Live105 San Francisco (radio) – February 7, 1996] It was taken by Cindy Palmano in October 1995 in New Orleans.

== Promotion ==
In late 1995, Atlantic released a promotional-only CD in Germany and America simply titled Tori Amos, under catalog number PRCD-6535-2. "New Music from Tori Amos ..." appeared on the front cover, and upon opening the jewel case, "... is coming soon" appears on the back of the insert. The release is a 9-track promotional compilation of Amos's singles from her first two solo albums, meant for radio stations to play to generate interest in the forthcoming album. The track "Precious Things" is mislabeled as "These Precious Things" on both the CD and the back cover, while "Crucify (Remix)" is listed when in fact the album version of the song is included.

The album's first single, "Caught a Lite Sneeze", was released commercially and to radio stations on January 2, 1996, three weeks prior to the album's release.

Amos's marketing team made use of the internet to market and promote Boys for Pele. Some reviews provided links to the Atlantic homepage or to Amos's homepage to listen to audio clips from the album, while others provided telephone numbers to call to listen to audio clips. "Caught a Lite Sneeze" was notable in being one of the first singles to have its worldwide release on the internet as a free download.

== Critical reception ==
Professional ratings
Review scores
Source	Rating
AllMusic	5/5 stars
Encyclopedia of Popular Music	4/5 stars
Entertainment Weekly	C
Los Angeles Times	2/4 stars
Q	4/5 stars
Record Collector	5/5 stars
Pitchfork	9.2/10
Rolling Stone	2/5 stars
The Rolling Stone Album Guide	2.5/5 stars
Spin	9/10

Critics overall praised the album's expanded instrumentation, and the acoustics that recording the album in a church afforded, but otherwise reaction to the album was polarized, particularly with regard to the lyrics. Boys for Pele is more lyrically dense than Amos's two previous albums, taking poetic obscurity to new heights. Some critics praised its ultra-personal lyrics while others panned what they called its overt and excessive self-indulgence and "ozone-layer lyrics" described as unfathomable, impenetrable, and personally opaque. One scathing review suggested skipping the album, instead reading something "a little bit more intelligible—like maybe Gravity's Rainbow written in Greek", while Rolling Stone went as far to bluntly say that most of the album's lyrics are "ultimately mystifying and, well, bad". Robert Christgau of The Village Voice assigned the album a "dud" rating, indicating "a bad record whose details rarely merit further thought."

Music Week named Boys for Pele its "album of the week" in the issue dated January 13, 1996, describing it as an "emotional ballad-laden LP, exploring the dynamics of her soul" and also noting it was "intense and cultured".

One reviewer observed that Amos' unfettered creativity due to serving as her own producer cost the album its accessibility. Amos has stated that her goal was not to make radio-friendly music with universal lyrics, and went on to say that "a song is only part lyrics and, for me anyway, more than 50% music, easy. There's so much subtext in the music that's part of the story."

Amy Gentry has noted the gendered way that many critics, male and female alike, approached the album. This included mockery of Amos' performance style for being overly sexualized, and criticisms of the supposed lesbian subtext in the album's lyrics.

=== Accolades ===
The album was nominated for a Grammy in 1996 for Best Alternative Album, losing to Beck's Odelay.

Despite receiving mixed reviews upon its release, Boys for Pele has gone on to become a strong-selling album and to be cited as having been critically underrated. In 2008, The Guardian listed Boys for Pele on its list of 1,000 Albums To Hear Before You Die.

Source	Accolade	Rank
Spin	Best Albums of 1996	13
Spin	Best Albums of 1996	4*
WXPN Philadelphia	Best Albums of 1996	11*
Billboard Magazine	Best Album Sales of 1996	100
The War Against Silence	Best Albums of 1996	4

(*) designates readers' or listeners' lists.

== Commercial performance ==
The album debuted at number two on the Billboard 200, selling 102,000 copies in its first week, going on to achieve RIAA Gold certification in the US by early March. The album debuted at number two in the UK as well, making it the highest-charting transatlantic debut of any of Amos's albums. Prior to its release, the album achieved BPI Silver certification in the UK, followed by BPI Gold certification in March. By May, US sales were already nearing Platinum certification status when "Talula", the album's second US single, which also appeared in the film Twister, was released and accompanied by a sticker that read, "From Tori's new album Boys for Pele – 900,000 and climbing!". Dance remixes of "Professional Widow" were released in July and by the end of the month the single reached number one on the Billboard Hot Dance Music/Club Play charts in the US, as well as topping the charts in Italy and the United Kingdom. The successful releases of "Talula" and subsequently "Professional Widow" surged albums sales enough that Boys for Pele achieved RIAA Platinum certification in August, the day after the US release of the Hey Jupiter EP.

The success of remixes from this album led to the album being reissued in both the US and the UK. In the US, the original version of "Talula" was replaced by "Talula (The Tornado Mix)," which incorporates a minor dance beat. In the UK, "Talula (The Tornado Mix)" replaced the original version of the song and a remix of "Professional Widow" was added to the album, immediately following the original version of the song. As a result of the extra "Professional Widow" track, the song "In the Springtime of His Voodoo" was removed completely.

"In the Springtime of His Voodoo" was also remixed and released as a dance single, but was a much smaller club success. Interest in the album resurfaced when Amos sang vocals on "Blue Skies", another club and dance hit by dance music artist BT that reached number one on the Hot Dance/Club Play chart exactly one year after the release of Boys for Pele.

Boys for Pele remained on the Billboard 200 for 29 weeks throughout 1996, before falling off the chart in mid September. According to Billboard, the album ranked number 100 on the Year-End Album Charts of 1996 in the U.S. in December. To date, Boys for Pele is Amos's third-best selling album in the U.S.

In early 2016, Tori Amos announced via Twitter that the album is slated for a deluxe reissue later in the year, following the deluxe re-releases of her first two albums in 2015.

== Reissues ==
Boys for Pele was reissued in the United States in June 1996. This reissue replaced the original version of "Talula" with the "Tornado Mix". In February 1997, the album was reissued in the United Kingdom following the success of "Professional Widow". This 'Special Edition' inserted the full 8-minute Armand's Star Trunk Funkin' Mix of "Professional Widow" between the original version and "Mr. Zebra" and replaced the original version of "Talula" with the Tornado Mix version. Due to time restrictions, the U.K. reissue removed the song "In the Springtime of His Voodoo".

A double-CD 20th Anniversary Deluxe edition of Boys for Pele was released on November 11, 2016 by Rhino Records. This edition restored the album back to its original track list and had a bonus CD with twenty-one tracks, four of which were previously unreleased. Record Collector magazine praised the reissue, stating that the bonus material "will be difficult for fans to resist".

== Track listing ==
All tracks are written by Tori Amos.

Boys for Pele track listing
No.	Title	Length
1.	"Beauty Queen/Horses"	6:07
2.	"Blood Roses"	3:56
3.	"Father Lucifer"	3:43
4.	"Professional Widow"	4:31
5.	"Mr. Zebra"	1:07
6.	"Marianne"	4:07
7.	"Caught a Lite Sneeze"	4:24
8.	"Muhammad My Friend"	3:48
9.	"Hey Jupiter"	5:07
10.	"Way Down"	1:13
11.	"Little Amsterdam"	4:29
12.	"Talula"	4:08
13.	"Not the Red Baron"	3:49
14.	"Agent Orange"	1:26
15.	"Doughnut Song"	4:19
16.	"In the Springtime of His Voodoo"	5:32
17.	"Putting the Damage On"	5:08
18.	"Twinkle"	3:12
Total length:		70:32

Boys for Pele 20th Anniversary Edition bonus disc
No.	Title	Original release	Length
1.	"Hey Jupiter" (The Dakota version)	"Hey Jupiter" single	6:05
2.	"To the Fair Motormaids of Japan"	Previously Unreleased	4:18
3.	"That's What I Like Mick (The Sandwich Song)" (Chas & Dave cover)	"Caught a Lite Sneeze" single	3:00
4.	"Fire-Eater's Wife/Beauty Queen" (Demo version)	A Piano: The Collection	3:15
5.	"Professional Widow" (Armand's Star Trunk Funkin' Mix - Radio Edit)	"Professional Widow" single	3:49
6.	"Sugar" (Live)	"Hey Jupiter" single	5:32
7.	"Alamo"	"Talula" single	5:12
8.	"Talula" (M&M Mix)	Previously Unreleased	4:07
9.	"Professional Widow" (Merry Widow version - Live)	"Hey Jupiter" single	4:38
10.	"Frog on My Toe"	"Talula" single	3:45
11.	"Hungarian Wedding Song"	"Caught a Lite Sneeze" single	1:01
12.	"Walk to Dublin (Sucker Reprise)"	A Piano: The Collection	5:27
13.	"Toodles Mr. Jim"	"Caught a Lite Sneeze" single	3:09
14.	"Sister Named Desire"	"Talula" single	5:32
15.	"Amazing Grace/'til the Chicken"	"Talula" single	6:49
16.	"This Old Man"	"Caught a Lite Sneeze" single	1:45
17.	"Sucker"	Previously Unreleased	2:52
18.	"Honey" (Live)	"Hey Jupiter" single	3:46
19.	"Graveyard"	"Caught a Lite Sneeze" single	0:54
20.	"London Girls" (Chas & Dave cover)	"Caught a Lite Sneeze" single	3:21
21.	"In the Springtime of His Voodoo" (Rookery Ending)	Previously Unreleased	0:56

== Personnel ==
- Tori Amos – vocals, Bösendorfer piano, harmonium organ, clavichord, harpsichord, producer
- George Porter Jr. – bass
- Steve Caton – guitar, electric guitar, mandolin, swells
- Manu Katché – drums
- Marcel van Limbeek – Delgany Church bells
- James Watson – trumpet, brass conductor
- The Black Dyke Mills Band – brass
- The Sinfonia of London – strings
- John Philip Shenale – string arrangement
- Peter Willison – string orchestrator and conductor
- Alan Friedman – drum programming
- Clarence J. Johnson III – soprano sax, tenor sax
- Mino Cinelu – percussion
- Darryl Lewis – percussion
- Mark Mullins – trombone, horns
- Craig Klein – sousaphone
- Michael Deegan – bagpipes
- Bernard Quinn – bagpipes
- Nancy Shanks – additional vocals
- Mark Hawley – recording and mix engineer
- Marcel van Limbeek – recording and mixing engineer
- Rob van Tuin – assistant recording and mixing engineer
- Bob Clearmountain – mixing
- Bob Ludwig – mastering
- Cindy Palmano – artwork, photography, art direction
- Paddy Cramsie – graphic design
- Paul Chessell – graphic design

== Charts ==
=== Weekly charts ===
Chart (1996)	Peak position
Australian Albums (ARIA)	6
Austrian Albums (Ö3 Austria)	9
Belgian Albums (Ultratop Flanders)	8
Dutch Albums (Album Top 100)	6
European Albums (Eurotipsheet)	11
Finnish Albums (Suomen virallinen lista)	13
German Albums (Offizielle Top 100)	9
Irish Albums (IFPI)	4
New Zealand Albums (RMNZ)	15
Norwegian Albums (VG-lista)	27
Scottish Albums (Official Charts)	4
Swedish Albums (Sverigetopplistan)	4
Swiss Albums (Schweizer Hitparade)	14
UK Albums (Official Charts)	2
US Billboard 200	2
US Cash Box Top 200 Albums	5

Chart performance for Boys for Pele (2016 deluxe edition)
Chart (2016)	Peak position
Belgian Albums (Ultratop Flanders)	118
Belgian Albums (Ultratop Wallonia)	194

=== Year-end charts ===
Chart (1996)	Position
UK Albums Chart	139
US Billboard 200	100

=== Singles ===
Year	Song	Peak positions				
Year	Song	US Billboard Hot 100	US Modern Rock Tracks	Hot Dance Music/Club Play	UK Singles Chart	Top 100 Australian Singles
1996	"Caught a Lite Sneeze"	60	13	—	20	51
1996	"Talula"	119∞	—	—	22	131
1996	"Professional Widow" (remix)	108∞	—	1	—	—
1996	"Hey Jupiter"	—	—	—	20ψ	17ψ
1996	"In the Springtime of his Voodoo" (remix)	125∞	—	6	—	—
1997	"Professional Widow (It's Got To Be Big)" (remix)	—	—	—	1	17ψ

∞ – Denotes position on Billboard Bubbling Under Hot 100 Singles
ψ – Denotes position of "Hey Jupiter/Professional Widow" double A-side single

== Certifications ==
Region	Certification	Certified units/sales
Australia (ARIA)	Gold	35,000^{^}
Canada (Music Canada)	Gold	50,000^{^}
United Kingdom (BPI)	Gold	100,000^{^}
United States (RIAA)	Platinum	1,000,000^{^}
^{^} Shipments figures based on certification alone.

== Release history ==
Country	Date	Label	Format	Catalogue number(s)
United Kingdom	January 22, 1996	East West	CD	82862-2
United Kingdom	January 22, 1996	East West	Cassette	82862-4
United Kingdom	January 22, 1996	East West	LP	82862-1
United Kingdom	February 10, 1997	East West	CD∞	80696-2
United States	January 23, 1996	Atlantic	CD	82862-2
United States	January 23, 1996	Atlantic	Cassette	82862-4
United States	January 23, 1996	Atlantic	LP	82862-1
United States	June 1996	Atlantic	CD∞	82862-2
Canada	January 24, 1996	East West	CD	8286223
Japan	February 25, 1996	Atlantic	CD	AMCE-918

∞ Denotes reissue
