= Tori Amos: Live from New York =

1997 benefit concert

Live from New York

Video by Tori Amos
- Released: 1997
- Recorded: January 23, 1997
- Venue: The Theater at Madison Square Garden (New York City)
- Length: 99:10
- Label: Warner Music Vision
- Director: Milton Lage
- Producer: Joel Stillerman

Tori Amos chronology
Little Earthquakes (1992)	Live from New York (1997)	Complete Videos 1991-1998 (1998)

Professional ratings
Review scores
Source	Rating
Uncut	3/5 stars

Tori Amos: Live from New York is a benefit concert performed by American singer-songwriter and pianist Tori Amos on January 23, 1997. The concert was performed at the Theater at Madison Square Garden in New York City to launch "Unlock the Silence", a year-long promotional and fund-raising campaign sponsored by Calvin Klein to raise awareness of the work undertaken by RAINN, the Rape, Abuse and Incest National Network, a non-profit organization offering support and counseling to survivors of sexual assault. The performance included compositions from Amos' first three albums, including "Silent All These Years" from her debut album Little Earthquakes (1992), which served as the touchstone track for the "Unlock the Silence" campaign.

During the performance of "Muhammad My Friend", Amos was joined on stage by her friend Maynard James Keenan from the band Tool.

The concert was released on VHS in late 1997.

== Setlist ==
No.	Title	Album	Length
1.	"Beauty Queen/Horses"	Boys for Pele
2.	"Leather"	Little Earthquakes
3.	"Blood Roses"	Boys for Pele
4.	"Little Amsterdam"	Boys for Pele
5.	"Cornflake Girl"	Under the Pink
6.	"The Waitress"	Under the Pink
7.	"Little Earthquakes"	Little Earthquakes
8.	"Upside Down"
9.	"Winter"	Little Earthquakes
10.	"Precious Things"	Little Earthquakes
11.	"Caught a Lite Sneeze"	Boys for Pele
12.	"Talula" (The Tornado Mix)	Boys for Pele
13.	"Me and a Gun"	Little Earthquakes
14.	"Marianne"	Boys for Pele
15.	"Silent All These Years"	Little Earthquakes
16.	"Muhammad My Friend" (with Maynard James Keenan from Tool)	Boys for Pele
17.	"Pretty Good Year"	Under the Pink
Total length:			99:10

== Charts ==
Chart performance for Live from New York
Chart (1997)	Peak position
UK Music Video Chart (OCC)	24
