= Tales of a Librarian =

Compilation album by Tori Amos
- Released: November 17, 2003
- Recorded: 1990 – Summer 2003
- Length: 78:00
- Label: Atlantic
- Producers: Tori Amos; Eric Rosse

Tori Amos chronology
Scarlet's Walk (2002)	Tales of a Librarian (2003)	The Beekeeper (2005)

Singles from Tales of a Librarian
- 1. "Mary" Released: 2003; 2. "Angels" Released: 2003

Professional ratings
Review scores
Source	Rating
AllMusic	4.6/5 stars
Mojo	4/5 stars
musicOMH	(positive)
Q	3/5 stars
Rolling Stone Album Guide	4/5 stars
Uncut	5/5 stars

A Tori Amos Collection: Tales of a Librarian is the first retrospective compilation album by American singer-songwriter and pianist Tori Amos. Given the option to be involved in the project, Amos elected to take a central role in the production of the collection, released in 2003 on her former label Atlantic Records.

Amos described the compilation as a "sonic autobiography", a title derived from her dislike of the term "greatest hits". Recording under the premise that a librarian is a "chronicler", Amos pieced together the collection in accordance with the Dewey Decimal System; so, for example, "Sweet Dreams", which contains the lyrics "Land, land of liberty / We're run by a constipated man", is listed as "973.938: History of North America -- Politics of Illusion". Amos revisited the mixing of many of her own favorite songs from her career, focusing on those she thought were not fully realized in their original recordings and those that she felt explained her life story. Additionally, Amos added two new songs and two re-recorded B-sides: "Angels", "Snow Cherries from France", "Sweet Dreams", and "Mary", respectively. The latter two compositions were originally recorded in 1990 during sessions for Little Earthquakes (1992).

"Mary" and "Angels" were released as promotional singles from the album.

== Track listing ==
=== CD ===
All tracks are written by Amos.

No.	Title	Original appearance	Length
1.	"Precious Things"	Little Earthquakes (1992)	4:29
2.	"Angels"	previously unreleased	4:27
3.	"Silent All These Years"	Little Earthquakes	4:10
4.	"Cornflake Girl"	Under the Pink (1994)	5:05
5.	"Mary" (re-recorded)	B-side to "Crucify" (1992)	4:42
6.	"God"	Under the Pink	3:54
7.	"Winter"	Little Earthquakes	5:43
8.	"Spark"	From the Choirgirl Hotel (1998)	4:13
9.	"Way Down" (extended)	Boys for Pele (1996)	1:50
10.	"Professional Widow" (Armand's Star Trunk Funkin' Mix; Radio Edit)	Boys for Pele	3:48
11.	"Mr. Zebra"	Boys for Pele	1:05
12.	"Crucify"	Little Earthquakes	5:00
13.	"Me and a Gun"	Little Earthquakes	3:43
14.	"Bliss"	To Venus and Back (1999)	3:35
15.	"Playboy Mommy"	From the Choirgirl Hotel	4:06
16.	"Baker Baker"	Under the Pink	3:12
17.	"Tear in Your Hand"	Little Earthquakes	4:38
18.	"Sweet Dreams" (re-recorded)	B-side to "Winter" (1992)	3:39
19.	"Jackie's Strength"	From the Choirgirl Hotel	4:25
20.	"Snow Cherries from France"	previously unreleased	2:56

=== Deluxe edition bonus DVD ===
==== Live ====
All tracks are written by Amos.

No.	Title	Length
1.	"Pretty Good Year" (recorded live during soundcheck from Welcome to Sunny Florida, September 4, 2003)	3:47
2.	"Honey" (recorded live during soundcheck from Welcome to Sunny Florida, September 4, 2003)	4:00
3.	"Northern Lad" (recorded live during soundcheck from Welcome to Sunny Florida, September 4, 2003)	4:27

==== Others ====
All tracks are written by Amos.

No.	Title	Length
1.	"Putting the Damage On" (remixed; runs over photo gallery)	5:08
2.	"Mr. Zebra" (instrumental; runs over photo gallery and navigation menu)	1:05
3.	"Putting the Damage On" (instrumental)	5:08

=== iTunes bonus tracks ===
All tracks are written by Amos.

No.	Title	Original appearance	Length
21.	"Putting the Damage On" (album version)	Boys for Pele	5:08
22.	"Pretty Good Year" (live from sound check)	Under the Pink	4:12

== Charts ==
Chart performance for Tales of a Librarian
Chart (2003)	Peak position
Australian Albums (ARIA)	93
Austrian Albums (Ö3 Austria)	72
Belgian Albums (Ultratop Flanders)	34
Dutch Albums (Album Top 100)	93
Irish Albums (IRMA)	67
Italian Albums (FIMI)	65
Polish Albums (ZPAV)	24
Scottish Albums (Official Charts)	77
UK Albums (Official Charts)	74
US Billboard 200	40

== Certifications ==
Region	Certification	Certified units/sales
Australia (ARIA)	Gold	35,000^{^}
United Kingdom (BPI)	Silver	60,000^{*}
United States	—	295,000
^{*} Sales figures based on certification alone.^{^} Shipments figures based on certification alone.
