= Putting the Damage On =

Song by Tori Amos

from the album Boys for Pele
- Released: 1996
- Studio: Christ Church (Delgany, Ireland): A Georgian house (County Cork, Ireland)
- Genre: Art pop; baroque pop
- Length: 5:08
- Label: Atlantic
- Songwriter: Tori Amos
- Producer: Tori Amos

"Putting the Damage On" is a ballad by American singer-songwriter and pianist Tori Amos, and is featured as the 17th track on her third studio album, Boys for Pele (1996). The song may have been initially considered as a single for the album, because copies of the album were accompanied by a sticker listing this song, along with "Caught a Lite Sneeze" and "Talula," as feature songs. Of all five singles released from the album, "Putting the Damage On" was not one of them. In the song, Amos is accompanied by her own piano playing, and by the Black Dyke Band (which decades earlier had played an instrumental version of the Beatles' song "Yellow Submarine" as an Apple Records single).

== Subsequent appearances ==
An edited version appeared as a bonus track for Amos' 2003 compilation album, Tales of a Librarian. A remastered version of the album track was featured in the 2006 box set, A Piano: The Collection.

A live version was officially released for the Denver, Colorado, show of The Original Bootlegs series that Amos released in conjunction with her 2005 tour promoting The Beekeeper.

=== Twilight Mix ===
An alternate version of the song, titled the "Twilight Mix", was released in 1997, and includes extra background vocals, snare drums, and a structural edit that removes the bridge. The "Twilight Mix" was featured on a 12-track promotional CD titled Retrospective: The Benefit for RAINN, numbered Atlantic #PRCD 6999-2, issued by Atlantic Records in conjunction with RAINN in 1997. (This is not to be confused with a promotional 2-track CD single called "The Benefit For RAINN", numbered Atlantic #PRCD 8020-2 and #PRCD 6995-2, which was given out as a promotional item by retailers in conjunction with Calvin Klein and contained the album version of the track.)

The "Twilight Mix" began climbing the charts in Poland and Austria in late 1997, peaking at # 28 in both countries.
