= In the Springtime of His Voodoo =

Single by Tori Amos

from the album Boys for Pele
- Released: September 24, 1996
- Studio: A church (Delgany, Ireland); A Georgian house (County Cork, Ireland)
- Genre: Baroque pop
- Length: 5:32 (LP version)
- Label: Atlantic
- Songwriter: Tori Amos
- Producer: Tori Amos

Tori Amos singles chronology
"Hey Jupiter" (1996)	"In the Springtime of His Voodoo" (1996)	"Spark" (1998)

"In the Springtime of His Voodoo" is a song written by American singer-songwriter and pianist Tori Amos. It is a harpsichord-driven track on her third studio album, Boys for Pele (1996). The song was released in September 1996, by Atlantic Records, as the fifth single from the Boys for Pele album in the U.S., containing remixes by house music producers Steve Donato and Vinny Vero.

The song was removed from the 1997 re-issued version of Boys for Pele in the UK and Australasia, due to time constraints after adding the Armand's Star Trunk Funkin' Mix of "Professional Widow". "In the Springtime of His Voodoo" was also remixed and released as a dance single, but was a much smaller club success. Interest in the album resurfaced when Amos sang vocals on "Blue Skies", another club and dance hit by dance music artist BT that reached No. 1 on the U.S. Hot Dance Club Play chart exactly one year after the release of Boys for Pele.

== Critical reception ==
Larry Flick from Billboard magazine wrote, "Who'da thunk that Amos would become the belle of clubland? She has accomplished this feat thanks to several crafty 12-inchers that have placed her amid state-of-the-floor grooves. No doubt, her hot streak will continue with this sprawling and spacious post-production, which sews her vamps into a quickly shifting arrangement that mines electro-trance and deep-house ground." He added, "Remixers Vinny Vero and Stephen Donato had a field day with this tune, dissecting the melody and rebuilding it with a seemingly bottomless bag of sound effects and percussion rolls. Perfectly designed to give peak-hour club journeys a trippy, otherworldly feel."

== Personnel (of original recording on Boys for Pele) ==
- Tori Amos: Bösendorfer piano, harpsichord, vocals
- Alan Friedman: organ, drum programming
- Manu Katché: drums
- Steve Caton: guitars
- George Porter Jr: bass
- Mino Cinelu: percussion
- Nancy Shanks: additional vocals
- Michael Deegan and Bernard Quinn: bagpipes

== Charts ==
Chart performance for "In The Springtime Of His Voodoo"
Chart	Peak position
US Bubbling Under Hot 100 (Billboard)	20
US Dance Club Songs (Billboard)	6

== Singles and compilations ==
=== CD single ===
1. "In the Springtime of His Voodoo (LP Mix) – 5:32
2. "In the Springtime of His Voodoo (Hasbrouck Heights Single Mix) – 4:25
3. "In the Springtime of His Voodoo (Hasbrouck Heights Club Mix) – 10:04
4. "In the Springtime of His Voodoo (Quiet Mix) – 4:30
5. "In the Springtime of His Voodoo (Sugar Dub) – 8:52

=== 12" single ===
1. "In the Springtime of His Voodoo (Hasbrouck Heights Single Mix) – 4:25
2. "In the Springtime of His Voodoo (Hasbrouck Heights Club Mix) – 10:04
3. "In the Springtime of His Voodoo (Quiet Mix) – 4:30
4. "In the Springtime of His Voodoo (Sugar Dub) – 8:52

=== Compilations ===
- 2016 – the "Boys for Pele" 2 CD Deluxe includes "In the Springtime of His Voodoo (Rookery Ending)".
