= Live from New York =

Live from New York may refer to "Live from New York, it's Saturday Night!", a line ending the cold opening of each episode of the American television show Saturday Night Live (SNL). Other SNL-related references include:

- Gilda Radner: Live From New York, a 1979 one-woman show by Gilda Radner, later released as the film Gilda Live
- Live from New York: An Uncensored History of Saturday Night Live, a 2002 book by Tom Shales and James Andrew Miller
- Live from New York!, a 2015 documentary film on the history of SNL

== Music ==
- Tori Amos: Live from New York, a 1998 concert video and album by Tori Amos
- Live from New York (Tori Amos album), album of the concert
- Live from New York (Jesus Culture album)
- Live from New York, album by Phil Woods 1982
- Live from New York, album by John Abercrombie / Andy LaVerne 2010
- Live from New York, album by Donna Summer 2008 album and DVD
- Beacon Theatre: Live from New York Joe Bonamassa 2012
- Live from New York, video by Marc Anthony 2005
- Live from New York, album by Raekwon 1999
