= Oxford Road =

Oxford Road may be:

- Oxford Road, Hong Kong (牛津道), Kowloon Tong, Hong Kong
- Oxford Road, Reading, Berkshire, England
- Oxford Road, Singapore
- Oxford Road, Manchester, the main southern approach to the city
- Manchester Oxford Road railway station
- Oxford Road (Ohio), now known as Old Oxford Road
- Oxford Road Commonwealth War Graves Commission Cemetery in Belgium
- Oxford Road Halt railway station, a former railway station near Oxford, England
- Oxford Rewley Road railway station, a former railway station in Oxford, England
- Oxford Road, Cowley, Oxfordshire, which leads on to Cowley Road, Oxford
- Oxford Road, Littlemore, Oxfordshire, which leads on to Iffley Road, Oxford

See also

- Oxford Street in Westminster, London, formerly known as Oxford Road
