= Raspberry Swirl =

- Artwork for international release (UK CD single pictured)

Single by Tori Amos

from the album From the Choirgirl Hotel
- Released: August 24, 1998
- Recorded: 1998
- Studio: Martian Engineering (Cornwall)
- Genre: Alternative dance; alternative rock
- Length: 3:58
- Label: Atlantic
- Songwriter: Tori Amos
- Producer: Tori Amos

Tori Amos singles chronology
"Jackie's Strength" (1998)	"Cruel" / "Raspberry Swirl" (1998)	"Bliss" (1999)

"Raspberry Swirl" is a song written and performed by American singer-songwriter and pianist Tori Amos. It was released as the second single from her fourth studio album From the Choirgirl Hotel (1998) in Germany and Australia, and as the third and final single in North America and the UK. In the United States it was released as a double A-side single with "Cruel", off the same album. In Germany, Australia and the UK it was released as its own single. Two variations of an identical 12" vinyl promotional release were issued in the U.K.

"Raspberry Swirl" was Amos's first single to be nominated for a Grammy Award, being nominated for Best Female Rock Vocal Performance in 1999.

== About ==
"Raspberry Swirl" is about Amos' past relationship with a female friend and was written in response to the men in her relationships.

In some of my relationships with a few of my women friends, I play a certain role. Heh, this is really getting in...I know, I hope my father's not watching this. He just doesn't know what to do. The straight-jacket's coming. But you know I always told my dad – you know, gays, lesbians, he just has to get used to it. One of the nieces and nephews is gonna be one, he's just gotta get ready. So what I said was ah to Beenie, who's the love of my life. My husband understands this, that we're married. We're absolutely married. And I adore her with all my heart. And she's dated some idiots. And I hope you're watching. I want you to know what I think of you and in another life, I'll absolutely kick your ass. And I'm going to kick it right now actually, because this is for her and I'm in love with her. So everybody, off your asses!

== Music video ==
A still from the video "Raspberry Swirl"

The video for Raspberry Swirl was directed by Barnaby & Scott and filmed in August 1998.

I will tell you this. Kids and Pigs mixed together with their gorging of sweets and excited kiddie poo vomit and literally piggy poo and cake puddingie ickie oogie sugarie pukie all messied together sitting there rotting under the lights take after take and you wonder why I carry an Oxygen machine – card holder since 94. Raspberry was one of the longer days of my life... Karen pulled in these younger directors: Barnaby & Scott. I liked the idea their visual sense and their openness to Karen's mad visions. She was inspired by an Urban Alice and Wonderland feel if I recall the treatment correctly. Kids with Red wings – red wigs little Toris she said. This Boy leading me into a world where Karen truly lives. Every movie every make, Karen can give her version – 'A road ain't NO ONE EVER EVVA thought of pushing,' a long by magical day."

== Review ==
"The fourth track, Raspberry Swirl (as in, unsurprisingly, 'Boy, you better make her raspberry swirl"), is the key," enthused John Aizlewood in Q's review of From the Choirgirl Hotel. "Seemingly throwaway, its programming doffs a cap to dance [and] Amos' treated vocals recall Van Helden mixmastery. Before 30 seconds have passed, she's declared 'Let's go' and in one cathartic moment becomes her own woman again, via the remainder of a song that doesn't need twists to shine."

== Track listings ==
"Raspberry Swirl" was released in the United States and Canada as a double A-side with "Cruel".

=== August 1998 U.K. single (cancelled release) ===
CD single – Atlantic AT0045CD

1. "Raspberry Swirl" (Lip Gloss version) – 3:38
2. "Raspberry Swirl" (Sticky Extended Vocal version)¹ – 7:50
3. "Raspberry Swirl" (Scarlet Spectrum Feels)¹ – 8:10

12-inch promo – Atlantic 3331000032

1. "Raspberry Swirl" (Sticky Extended Instrumental)¹ – 9:34
2. "Raspberry Swirl" (Sticky Extended Vocal version)¹ – 7:50

CD promo – Atlantic 3333000092

1. "Raspberry Swirl" (Lip Gloss version) – 3:38
2. "Raspberry Swirl" (Naked) – 3:44

=== November 1998 U.S. single ===
7-inch single – Atlantic 7-84412

1. "Cruel" (Shady Feline Mix) – 3:49
2. "Raspberry Swirl" (Lip Gloss version) – 3:38

CD single – Atlantic 2-84412 / Cassette single – Atlantic 4-84412

1. "Cruel" (Shady Feline Mix) – 3:49
2. "Raspberry Swirl" (Lip Gloss version) – 3:38
3. "Ambient Raspberry Swirl" (Scarlet Spectrum Feels)¹ – 8:10
4. "Mainline Cherry" (Ambient Spark)² – 5:12

Notes

¹ Remixed by Andy Gray.
² Remixed by Albert Cabrera.

== Charts ==
Chart (1998)	Position
Australian Singles Chart	57
Canada Singles Chart	20
UK Club Chart (Music Week)	89
US Billboard Hot 100 Single Sales	38

=== Release history ===
Release dates and formats for "Raspberry Swirl"
Region	Date	Label(s)	Format(s)	Cat. No.	Ref.
United Kingdom (cancelled)	10 August 1998	Atlantic	Cassette; CD; 12-inch	AT 0045C; AT 0045CD; AT 0045T	
Germany	30 August 1998	Atlantic	CD	AT 0045CD	
