= Y Kant Tori Read (album) =

Studio album by Y Kant Tori Read
- Released: 1988
- Recorded: 1987
- Studios: Hollywood Sound; South Combe Studios; Ground Control Studios; Sound Castle Studios; Capitol Studios; The Grey Room
- Genres: Synth-pop; new wave; hard rock
- Length: 49:10
- Label: Atlantic
- Producer: Joe Chiccarelli

Tori Amos chronology
Y Kant Tori Read (1988)	Little Earthquakes (1992)

Singles from Y Kant Tori Read
- 1. "The Big Picture" Released: 1988; 2. "Cool on Your Island" Released: 1988

Professional ratings
Review scores
Source	Rating
AllMusic	3/5 stars

Y Kant Tori Read is the debut and only studio album by American synth-pop band of the same name, fronted by then-unknown singer-songwriter and pianist Tori Amos. It was released in 1988 by Atlantic Records.

== Background ==
The band consisted of Amos, singer-pianist Kim Bullard, drummer Matt Sorum who later joined Guns N' Roses, as well as long-time Amos collaborator guitarist Steve Caton; other contributors included Richárd Bernard on bouzouki, and various session musicians. Due to the title, some critics believed the album was a solo project by a woman named "Tori Read". This was compounded by the fact that Amos is billed simply as "Tori" in the liner notes.

Amos chose producer Joe Chiccarelli, having admired his work on other albums. According to Chiccarelli in an interview with HitQuarters:

"[Tori Amos] had a very strong vision of what she wanted to do on her first album. And despite the lack of success of that album, it was an interesting process because she was very vocal and very passionate about how she wanted it to sound and what her influences were and the emotions she was trying to convey."

Although Amos had effectively disowned the album for many years, Chiccarelli has said that she was very happy with it at the time.

== Promotion and release ==
The eponymous studio album was released in 1988 to poor sales and the band broke up shortly after. Its lack of success and subsequent deletion has made it one of the most sought-after Tori Amos collectibles, fetching upwards of $1,000 in compact disc format in original longbox. At the height of Amos' career, vinyl copies would often sell for between $300–500 but, due to the decline of music collectibles and the heavy bootlegging of the album, they now frequently sell for between $50–80.

Because of the scarcity of legitimate copies of the album it has been heavily bootlegged, so much so that an extensive FAQ on the topic was created. Bootleg versions generally stem from one of the first editions to surface, on a foreign label called Pacific Records. These usually have six "bonus tracks" from later in Amos' career; "Song for Eric", "Ode to the Banana King (Part 1)", "Happy Phantom" (live), "Ring My Bell", "The Happy Worker" and "Workers". Other editions, particularly one that surfaced in Germany, were issued to intentionally resemble the original and fool legitimate collectors.

The number on the spine of the original CD reads 81845-2. The majority of bootlegs list this number incorrectly because the stolen artwork is taken from the easier to find LP version of the release, which had a different release number.

Non-promotional copies of the record are more desirable than promotionally issued copies. (The reverse is generally the case in music collectibles.) Because the record sold so poorly, the majority of commercially released copies were recalled, stamped with a gold promo stamp, and given a cut-out mark. Thus there are actually more promotional copies of the record than not.

Several singles were released to promote the album, though most promotionally and not commercially. "The Big Picture" was released as a 12" vinyl promotional single with unique artwork; "Cool on Your Island" was issued as a 7" vinyl promotional single with a special edit version of the song; it was also included as a B-side to a promotional CD featuring the song "A Groovy Kind of Love" by Phil Collins. (On The Rosie O'Donnell Show, Amos told a story from this era of being stopped by police while traveling through Germany because her friend was carrying marijuana; when she told the police officer that she was "on a CD with Phil Collins" she was set free.)

One music video was produced, for the song "The Big Picture", featuring Amos performing on a "ghetto city" sound stage set.

Amos has continued to play a select few songs from this album ("On the Boundary", "Etienne", "Cool on Your Island", and snippets of "Fire on the Side") live in concert. During the 2014 Unrepentant Geraldines tour, however, Amos played a full version of "Fire on the Side", as well as "Floating City" and "Pirates". "The Big Picture" and "Fayth" were performed as mashups with George Michael's "Faith" and the Cure's "Pictures of You" respectively. She has yet to perform "Heart Attack at 23" and "You Go to My Head" in any capacity.

In 2017, Amos said she had made peace with the album, and was considering reissuing it in the future. An entirely remastered edition of the album was discreetly released on all digital and streaming services for the first time on September 1, 2017, with no official announcement or promotion. This was followed by a limited physical re-release of the remastered album on CD and transparent orange vinyl by Rhino Records as part of International Record Store Day's Black Friday exclusive releases on November 24, 2017. This also resulted in a one-week UK chart entry, at number 6 on the UK Record Store Chart, on December 1, 2017.

== Track listing ==
All tracks are written by Tori Amos, except as noted.

Side one
No.	Title	Writer(s)	Length
1.	"The Big Picture"	Tori Amos; Kim Bullard	4:19
2.	"Cool on Your Island"	Amos; Bullard	4:57
3.	"Fayth"	Amos; Brad Cobb	4:23
4.	"Fire on the Side"		4:53
5.	"Pirates"	Amos; Bullard	4:16

Side two
No.	Title	Writer(s)	Length
6.	"Floating City"		5:22
7.	"Heart Attack at 23"		5:16
8.	"On the Boundary"		4:38
9.	"You Go to My Head"		3:55
10.	"Etienne Trilogy" ("The Highlands" / "Etienne" / "Skyeboat Song")	Amos; Bullard; Traditional	6:45
Total length:			49:10

== Personnel ==
Credits are adapted from the Y Kant Tori Read liner notes.

Musicians

- Tori Amos – lead singer, acoustic piano, keyboards
- Paulinho Da Costa – percussion
- Richard Bernard – bouzouki
- Gene Black – guitar
- Kim Bullard – acoustic piano, programming, keyboards
- Steve Caton – guitar
- Vinnie Colaiuta – drums
- Devon Dickson – bagpipes
- Steve Farris – guitars
- Tim Landers – fretless bass guitar
- Fernando Saunders – bass guitar
- Matt Sorum – drums
- Peter White – acoustic guitars
- Eric Williams – mandolin
- CeCe Bullard
- Merry Clayton
- James House
- Rick Nielsen
- Robin Zander
- Nancy Shanks
- The Valentine Brothers
