= Professional Widow =

1996 single by Tori Amos

Single by Tori Amos

from the album Boys for Pele
- Released: July 2, 1996
- Studio: A church (Delgany, Ireland); A Georgian house (County Cork, Ireland)
- Length: 4:31 (album version); 8:08 (remix)
- Label: Atlantic; EastWest
- Songwriter: Tori Amos
- Producer: Tori Amos

Tori Amos singles chronology
"Talula" (1996)	"Professional Widow" (1996)	"Hey Jupiter" (1996)

"Professional Widow" is a song by the American singer-songwriter and pianist Tori Amos, released on her third album, Boys for Pele (1996). It is a harpsichord-driven rock song with lyrics rumored to have been inspired by the American songwriter Courtney Love.

"Professional Widow" was released as the album's third single on July 2, 1996, by Atlantic and EastWest, with remixes by the house producers Armand van Helden and MK. It reached number one on the US Billboard Dance Club Play chart. In Italy, the original version peaked at number two in October 1996. An edited version of the Armand's Star Trunk Funkin' Mix of "Professional Widow" was released as a double A-side single with "Hey Jupiter" in Europe and Australia.

On December 30, 1996, van Helden's remix was released as a single in the UK as "Professional Widow (It's Got to Be Big)". It topped the UK singles chart in January 1997 and reached the top 20 in Finland, Iceland, Ireland and Norway. In 2022, Rolling Stone named the remix the 109th-greatest dance song.

== Lyrics ==
"Professional Widow" was rumored to be a diss track about the American songwriter Courtney Love, the widow of the Nirvana songwriter Kurt Cobain. Love said she had never determined if she was the "professional widow" of the title. In 1996, Amos said she had never met Love and that the song was about her own experience and "the part of myself that's Lady Macbeth". In a 2003 television interview, when the host said the song was inspired by Love, Amos interrupted with "allegedly" and smiled.

In 2026, Amos said "Professional Widow" was about her complicated relationship with her father, a Methodist priest, who was also her first manager. Amos referenced Love in her song "Shush" from the 2026 album In Times of Dragons.

== Remix ==
"Professional Widow" was remixed by the American DJ Armand van Helden. In Europe, the remix became more widely known than the original song.

Van Helden said that Amos was contractually entitled to approve all remixes, and called to thank him when his became popular in Europe. In a 1998 interview with Music & Media, Amos said: "It did kick my ass a bit [...] I know what van Helden took and what he did and I think he did some very clever things [...] I loved the fact that he didn't try and retain that at all, he went completely to the other pole."

== Critical reception ==
Aberdeen Press and Journal said "Professional Widow" as "excellent". Justin Chadwick from Albumism wrote in his retrospective review of Boys for Pele, "Though much of the world is more familiar with the propulsive, dancefloor-filling Armand Van Helden remix of 'Professional Widow', its original incarnation featured here is noteworthy for its much-debated allusions to none other than Courtney Love." Neil Z. Yeung from AllMusic described it as a "powerful dose of industrial-piano ferocity that holds nothing back in its demands for peace, love, and a little something extra." Paul Verna from Billboard named it a "highlight" of the album, viewing it as "searing" and "groove-heavy". The Daily Vault's Sean McCarthy felt it's one of the most "straightforward" songs of the album. Kevin Courtney from Irish Times declared it as "a mad maelstrom of beats and harpsichord arpeggia, a sort of Portishead for the beaten generation". In a separate review of the remix, Courtney wrote, "Older fans of Tori's introspective balladeering will be bemused that their heroine now sounds like Stretch & Vern. Calling this a Tori Amos single is like describing "Money for Nothing" as a Sting song, and the lady's sampled voice is just incidental to the handbag-heaving beat and bassline."

Alan Jones from Music Week deemed the remix a "brilliant reworking" that was "as different from the rest of the album as chalk is from cheese". Tim Jeffery from Record Mirror's Dance Update gave it five out of five, writing: "Needless to say, any lyrical subtlety has gone out of the window on this remixed package but that's not the point really. MK and Armand Van Helden pick and choose which of Tori's lines to chop up into bits and loop over their own music — Helden's is by far the most inventive with loads of strange synth sounds over a Bucketheads-style groove and a terrific atmospheric drop in the middle. A big club hit for sure but it'll be radio that decides this record's success or otherwise." Cynthia Joyce from Salon noted that Amos' "penchant for abrupt endings and ad nauseam repetition; still surfaces on more experimental songs" like "Professional Widow". Kevin Newman from Smash Hits named it the best track of the album with "Caught a Lite Sneeze", describing it as "more-Björk-than-Björk". In 2014, Stereogum ranked the song number 10 on their list of the 10 greatest Tori Amos songs, Mixmag featured it in their list of the best basslines in dance music in 2020, and in 2023, The Guardian ranked the song number five on their list of the 20 greatest Tori Amos songs. In 2022, Rolling Stone named the "Professional Widow" remix the 109th-greatest dance song.

== Music video ==
A music video was made for the "Star Trunk Funkin' Mix", comprising clips from other Amos videos edited together. It is the only video from between 1991 and 1998 that does not appear on Tori Amos: Complete Videos 1991–1998.

== Track listings ==
=== US "Professional Widow" single ===
- Maxi-CD
1. "Professional Widow" (LP mix) – 4:31
2. "Professional Widow" (Armand's Star Trunk Funkin' mix) – 8:08
3. "Professional Widow" (MK mix) – 7:20
4. "Professional Widow" (Just da Funk dub) – 3:44
5. "Professional Widow" (MK Vampire dub) – 6:56
6. "Professional Widow" (Armand's instrumental) – 5:35
7. "Professional Widow" (bonus beats) – 4:31
- 12-inch single

A1. "Professional Widow" (Armand's Star Trunk Funkin' mix) – 8:08
A2. "Professional Widow" (Just da Funk dub) – 3:44
B1. "Professional Widow" (MK mix) – 7:20
B2. "Professional Widow" (MK Vampire dub) – 6:56

=== "Hey Jupiter" / "Professional Widow" ===
- UK and Australian CD single
1. "Hey Jupiter" (The Dakota version) – 6:03
2. "Professional Widow" (Armand's Star Trunk Funkin' mix radio edit) – 3:45
3. "Sugar" (live) – 5:43
4. "Honey" (live) – 4:19
- UK 12-inch single

A1. "Professional Widow" (Armand's Star Trunk Funkin' mix) – 8:08
B1. "Hey Jupiter" (The Dakota version) (radio edit) – 4:14
B2. "Talula" (BT's Synethasia mix) – 11:27

- UK cassette single
1. "Hey Jupiter" (The Dakota version) – 6:03
2. "Professional Widow" (Armand's Star Trunk Funkin' mix radio edit) – 3:45

=== "Professional Widow (It's Got to Be Big)" ===
- UK CD single
1. "Professional Widow (It's Got to Be Big)" (Armand's Star Trunk Funkin' mix radio edit) – 3:45
2. "Professional Widow (It's Got to Be Big)" (Mr Roy's 7-inch edit) – 3:47
3. "Professional Widow (It's Got to Be Big)" (Armand's Star Trunk Funkin' mix) – 8:06
4. "Professional Widow (It's Got to Be Big)" (Mr Roy's Cosmic Cottage mix) – 7:55
5. "Professional Widow (It's Got to Be Big)" (Just da Funk dub) – 3:31
- UK 12-inch single

A1. "Professional Widow (It's Got to Be Big)" (Mr Roy's Cosmic Cottage mix) – 7:55
A2. "Professional Widow (It's Got to Be Big)" (Mr Roy's 7-inch edit) – 3:47
B1. "Professional Widow (It's Got to Be Big)" (Armand's Star Trunk Funkin' mix) – 8:06
B2. "Professional Widow (It's Got to Be Big)" (Just da Funk dub) – 3:31

- UK cassette single
1. "Professional Widow (It's Got to Be Big)" (Mr Roy's 7-inch edit) – 3:47
2. "Professional Widow (It's Got to Be Big)" (Armands Star Trunk Funkin' mix) – 8:06
- European maxi-CD single
1. "Professional Widow" (Armand's Star Trunk Funkin' mix radio edit) – 3:45
2. "Professional Widow" (Armand's Star Trunk Funkin' mix) – 8:08
3. "Professional Widow" (MK mix) – 7:20
4. "Professional Widow" (MK Vampire dub) – 6:56
- French maxi-CD single
1. "Professional Widow" (Mr Roy's 7-inch edit) – 3:47
2. "Professional Widow" (Mr Roy's Cosmic Cottage mix) – 7:55
3. "Professional Widow" (Armands Star Trunk Funkin' mix) – 8:06
4. "In the Springtime of His Voodoo" (Hasbrouck Heights club mix) – 10:00

== Credits and personnel ==
Credits are lifted from the Boys for Pele album booklet. The album version includes the cry of a bull, which is credited as "bull" in the booklet.

Recording and production

- Recorded at a church (Delgany, Ireland) and a "wonderfully damp Georgian house" (County Cork, Ireland)
- Additionally recorded at The Egyptian Room and Dinosaur Studios (New Orleans, Louisiana)
- Mixed at Jacobs Studios (Surrey, England), Mix This!, and Record One (Los Angeles)
- Mastered at Gateway Mastering (Portland, Maine)

Personnel

- Tori Amos – writing, vocals, harpsichord, Bösendorfer, production
- Alan Friedman – drum programming
- George Porter Jr. – bass guitar
- Manu Katche – drums
- Steve Caton – guitar
- Bull – bull
- Mark Hawley – recording, mixing (coda)
- Marcel van Limbeek – recording, mixing (coda)
- Rob van Tuin – recording assistance
- Bob Clearmountain – mixing
- Ryan Freeland – mixing assistance
- Bob Ludwig – mastering

== Charts ==
=== Weekly charts ===
Chart (1996–1997)	Peak position
Australia (ARIA) with "Hey Jupiter"	17
Austria (Ö3 Austria Top 40)	23
Belgium (Ultratop 50 Flanders) with "Hey Jupiter"	22
Belgium (Ultratop 50 Wallonia) with "Hey Jupiter"	22
Canada Dance/Urban (RPM)	11
Europe (Eurochart Hot 100)	11
Finland (Suomen virallinen lista)	16
France (SNEP)	35
Germany (GfK)	38
Iceland (Íslenski Listinn Topp 40)	6
Ireland (IRMA)	2
Israel (Israeli Singles Chart)	23
Italy (Musica e dischi)	2
Netherlands (Dutch Top 40)	29
Netherlands (Single Top 100)	33
Norway (VG-lista)	17
Scottish Singles Sales (Official Charts)	2
Sweden (Sverigetopplistan)	40
Switzerland (Schweizer Hitparade)	22
UK Singles (Official Charts)	1
UK Dance (Official Charts)	1
US Bubbling Under Hot 100 (Billboard)	8
US Dance Club Songs (Billboard)	1
US Dance Singles Sales (Billboard)	14

=== Year-end charts ===
Chart (1996)	Position
UK Club Chart (Music Week)	83
US Dance Club Play (Billboard)	34

Chart (1997)	Position
Australia (ARIA)	65
Europe (Eurochart Hot 100)	84
UK Singles (OCC)	47

== Certifications ==
Region	Certification	Certified units/sales
Australia (ARIA) "Professional Widow (It's Got to Be Big)"	Gold	35,000^{^}
United Kingdom (BPI) "Professional Widow"	Silver	200,000^{‡}
United Kingdom (BPI) "Professional Widow (It's Got to Be Big)"	Silver	200,000^{^}
^{^} Shipments figures based on certification alone.^{‡} Sales+streaming figures based on certification alone.

== Release history ==
Region	Version	Date	Format(s)	Label(s)	Ref.
United States	"Professional Widow"	July 2, 1996	CD	Atlantic	
United Kingdom	"Hey Jupiter" / "Professional Widow"	July 22, 1996	12-inch vinyl; CD; cassette	EastWest	
United Kingdom	"Professional Widow (It's Got to Be Big)"	December 30, 1996	12-inch vinyl; CD; cassette	EastWest	

== See also ==
- List of number-one dance singles of 1996 (U.S.)
- List of artists who reached number one on the U.S. dance chart
