= Baltimore (Tori Amos song) =

Single by Ellen Amos
- B-side: "Walking with You"
- Released: 1980
- Studio: Track Studios (Silver Spring, Maryland)
- Genre: Pop
- Label: MEA
- Songwriters: Ellen Amos; Michael Amos
- Producer: MEA

Ellen Amos singles chronology
"Baltimore" (1980)	"The Big Picture" (1988)

"Baltimore" is the debut single released by a pre-fame Tori Amos, under her birth name of (Myra) Ellen Amos.

Amos, then 16 years old, wrote the song with her brother Michael in response to a 1979 contest by the city of Baltimore, Maryland. Her new theme song for the Baltimore Orioles baseball team won the contest.

Pressed on only 500 7-inch vinyl records, it was given a citation by the Mayor of Baltimore. As of 2022, a copy of this record complete with original sleeve sells for $2,000 US. The sleeve is not a picture sleeve. A copy with an original resume for "Ellen Amos" could go for as much as $7,000. It features a B-side track, "Walking with You". It was released on "MEA Records", which was Amos' initials.

Max Welker played guitar on both songs (Yamaha SA-2000).

== Track listing ==
1. "Baltimore" – 3:31
2. "Walking with You" – 4:28
