= Little Earthquakes (video) =

Video by Tori Amos
- Released: October 1992
- Genres: Rock; pop
- Length: 59:08
- Label: Atlantic

Tori Amos chronology
Little Earthquakes (1992)	Live from New York (1998)

Little Earthquakes is a VHS video released by American singer-songwriter and pianist Tori Amos in 1992, which serves as Amos' first video release. The release contains all four music videos released in conjunction with Amos' debut solo album of the same name interspersed with live performances and interview footage.

== Contents ==
No.	Title	Type	Length
1.	"Silent All These Years"	Music Video
2.	"Leather"	Live
3.	"Precious Things"	Live
4.	"Crucify"	Music Video
5.	"Me and a Gun"	Live on Japanese Television
6.	"Little Earthquakes"	Live
7.	"China"	Music Video
8.	"Happy Phantom"	Live
9.	"Here. In My Head"	Live
10.	"Winter"	Music Video
11.	"Song for Eric"	Live
Total length:			59:08

== Charts ==
Chart performance for Little Earthquakes
Chart (1998)	Peak position
UK Music Video Chart (OCC)	10

== See also ==
Little Earthquakes (album)
