= The Big Picture (song) =

Single by Y Kant Tori Read

from the album Y Kant Tori Read
- B-side: "You Go to My Head"
- Released: 1988
- Genre: Synth-pop
- Length: 4:14 (7" single); 4:38 (12" single)
- Label: Atlantic
- Songwriters: Tori Amos; Kim Bullard
- Producer: Joe Chiccarelli

Y Kant Tori Read singles chronology
"Baltimore" (1980)	"The Big Picture" (1988)	"Cool on Your Island" (1988)

Music video
- "The Big Picture" on YouTube

"The Big Picture" is a song by American synth-pop band Y Kant Tori Read, commercially released by Atlantic Records in 1988 exclusively as a 7" vinyl single in a generic label sleeve. Two versions of a promotional 7" vinyl were also released, one with light blue labels and one with dark blue labels. A 12" promotional vinyl single was also issued with an accompanying picture sleeve. The song was a commercial failure and attracted no critic reviews.

A music video for "The Big Picture" was shot by Marty Callner. The only band member to appear in it is Tori Amos. It is typical of the era, featuring a scantily clad Amos cavorting and wreaking havoc on a sound-stage made to resemble the back alleys of Los Angeles. It is notable for a narrative introductory section during which Amos argues with a police officer about her illegally parked car. Amos' excuse is that someone broke into her car and stole her underwear: "That's gross!" The officer, undeterred, hands her the ticket and walks off with her garter belt hanging out of his back pocket.

Notably, graphic artist Rantz Hoseley, a friend of Amos' at the time, appears in the video as a street punk upon whose pants Amos spray-paints. Hoseley went on to edit the best selling Amos-themed comic anthology Comic Book Tattoo.

== Track listing ==
7" single (Atlantic 7-89086)

1. "The Big Picture" – 4:19
2. "You Go to My Head" – 3:55

12" promo single (Atlantic PR2298)

1. "The Big Picture" – 4:19
2. "The Big Picture" – 4:19
