= Talula =

1996 single by Tori Amos

Single by Tori Amos

from the album Boys for Pele
- B-side: "Samurai"; "Frog on My Toe"; "London Girls"; "Amazing Grace / Til' the Chicken"; "Sister Named Desire"; "Alamo"
- Released: March 11, 1996
- Studio: A church (Delgany, Ireland); A Georgian house (County Cork, Ireland)
- Length: 4:08
- Label: Atlantic; EastWest
- Songwriter: Tori Amos
- Producer: Tori Amos

Tori Amos singles chronology
"Caught a Lite Sneeze" (1996)	"Talula" (1996)	"Professional Widow" (1996)

"Talula" is a song by American singer-songwriter and pianist Tori Amos, released by Atlantic and EastWest Records as the second single from her third studio album, Boys for Pele (1996). The song reached No. 22 on the UK singles chart and appeared in the Jan de Bont film Twister.

The single version, titled "The Tornado Mix", is remixed by BT, who went on to work with Amos on "Blue Skies", and includes a minor dance beat. In the UK, "Talula (The Tornado Mix)" replaced the original version of the song on later pressings of the album and eventual re-pressings in the US and Australia. BT also remixed an extended mix called the "Synesthasia Mix" which appeared on copies of the single.

== Meaning ==
The song is about the concept of ideal woman and the fear of losing someone. The lyrics includes references to queens like Marie Antoinette and Anne Boleyn.

The B-side "Sister Named Desire" is a reference to Delirium's sister/brother Desire of Sandman, created by Amos' friend Neil Gaiman. The character of Delirium is frequently inspired by Tori, although Delirium was created before Gaiman met her. "Desire" was later remastered for the compilation Where's Neil When You Need Him?, which featured tracks inspired by Gaiman's work. This is not the first nor last time Tori has mentioned Neil Gaiman; he is referenced in her songs: "Tear in Your Hand", "Space Dog", "Horses", "Hotel", "Carbon", and "Not Dying Today".

== Critical reception ==
Larry Flick from Billboard magazine wrote, "Typically beady and tough to penetrate on a lyrical level, this is a roller coaster of musical sounds, rapidly swerving from sweeping acoustic strumming to electro-hip funk beats." Kevin Courtney from Irish Times felt tracks like "Talula" "creep over you like the smell of home cooking, but don't get too comfortable although Missy Amos can rustic up some very palatable fare, she has a rather irritating tendency to overturn the dinner table."

== Track listings ==
- US maxi-CD single
1. "Talula" (Tornado album version) – 3:43
2. "Samurai" – 3:03
3. "Frog on My Toe" – 3:40
4. "London Girls" (Chas & Dave cover) – 3:20
5. "Talula" (BT's Synethasia mix) – 11:27
- UK CD1 and Australian CD single
1. "Talula" (the Tornado mix) – 3:43
2. "Talula" (BT's Synethasia mix) – 11:27
3. "Amazing Grace / Til the Chicken" – 6:48
- UK CD2
1. "Talula" (the Tornado mix) – 3:43
2. "Frog on My Toe" – 3:40
3. "Sister Named Desire" – 5:29
4. "Alamo" – 5:11
- UK cassette single
1. "Talula" (the Tornado mix) – 3:43
2. "Sister Named Desire" – 5:29

== Credits and personnel ==
Credits are lifted from the Boys for Pele album booklet.

Recording and production

- Recorded at a church (Delgany, Ireland) and "a wonderfully damp Georgian house" (County Cork, Ireland)
- Additionally recorded at The Egyptian Room and Dinosaur Studios (New Orleans, Louisiana)
- Mixed at Jacobs Studios (Surrey, England), Mix This!, and Record One (Los Angeles)
- Tornado mix mixed on Euphonix at The Strongroom (London, England)
- Mastered at Gateway Mastering (Portland, Maine)

Personnel

- Tori Amos – writing, vocals, harpsichord, production
- George Porter Jr. – bass
- Manu Katche – drums
- Mino Cinelu – percussion
- Steve Caton – mandolins, all guitars
- Alan Friedman – drum programming
- Tracy Griffin – flugelhorn
- Brian Graber – flugelhorn
- Clarence J. Johnson III – tenor saxophone
- Mark Mullins – trombone, horn arrangement
- Craig Klein – sousaphone
- Mark Hawley – recording
- Marcel van Limbeek – recording
- Rob van Tuin – recording assistance
- Bob Clearmountain – mixing
- Ryan Freeland – mixing assistance
- Brian Transeau – Tornado mix reworking
- Tim Weidner – Tornado mix engineering and Sound Tools
- Bob Ludwig – mastering

== Charts ==
Chart (1996)	Peak position
Australia (ARIA)	131
Scotland Singles (OCC)	19
UK Singles (OCC)	22
US Bubbling Under Hot 100 (Billboard)	19
US Dance Singles Sales (Billboard)	49
