= Silent All These Years =

1991 single by Tori Amos

- Standard artwork for 1991 release (US cassette pictured)

Single by Tori Amos

from the album Little Earthquakes
- B-side: "Upside Down"; "Thoughts"; "Ode to the Banana King (Part One)"; "Song for Eric"; "Smells Like Teen Spirit"
- Released: November 1991
- Genre: Chamber pop; art pop
- Length: 4:11
- Label: Atlantic; EastWest
- Songwriter: Tori Amos
- Producers: Tori Amos; Eric Rosse

Tori Amos singles chronology
"Me and a Gun" (1991)	"Silent All These Years" (1991)	"China" (1992)

"Silent All These Years" is a song by American singer-songwriter and musician Tori Amos, released as the second single from her debut studio album, Little Earthquakes (1992). It was originally released in the United Kingdom in November 1991 via EastWest Records. It was released in North America in 1992 by Atlantic Records and was later used to promote awareness of the Rape, Abuse & Incest National Network (RAINN). In the UK, the single was re-released on August 10, 1992.

== Origins ==
Amos wrote "Silent All These Years" during a period of self-reflection and searching for solo album material after the failure of Y Kant Tori Read. According to VH1 Storytellers, she originally wrote this song with Al Stewart in mind to sing it. Eric Rosse, who was producing some other songs Amos had composed, heard it and told her, "You're out of your mind. That's your life story."

In the Little Earthquakes songbook, Amos reveals that writing the song was a slow, evolving process and that the light piano riff during the verses came first. This "bumble bee piano tinkle", as she calls it, is one of the more emblematic and recognizable parts of the song.

Lyrically, Amos was inspired by reading Hans Christian Andersen's The Little Mermaid story to her young niece, Cody.

== Releases ==
"Silent All These Years" was initially a B-side of the first single, "Me and a Gun". The decision to release "Silent All These Years" came after UK station Radio One named it "Song of the Week".

In the United Kingdom, it was released as the second single from Little Earthquakes in November 1991. Formats included a 12-inch and CD maxi single with the B-sides "Upside Down", "Me and a Gun" and "Thoughts" and a 7-inch backed with "Me and a Gun". It was re-released in August 1992 as the 6th and final single. The re-release included a CD maxi single Part 1 with the original track-listing and a "Limited Edition" Part 2 containing "Ode to the Banana King (Part One)", "Song for Eric", and a live version of "Happy Phantom". Part two was quite a limited edition release and is now a rare find at used record stores. The reissued 7-inch and cassette single replaced the original B-side with a cover of "Smells Like Teen Spirit".

In the United States, "Silent All These Years" was released on cassette as the first single, post-Y Kant Tori Read, in April 1992. Its lone B-side was "Upside Down". It was re-released in March 1997 as a promotional single for RAINN backed with a live version from "The Concert for RAINN", recorded on January 23, 1997.

=== Re-release and later coverage ===
1997 saw the re-release of "Silent All These Years" in the United States as a CD single as a fundraiser for RAINN. The original album version is included along with a live version, significantly longer, recorded during the Concert for RAINN that was aired on Lifetime Television.

In 1998, the song was included on the compilation Atlantic Records: 50 Years—The Gold Anniversary. Another compilation, titled Respect: A Century of Women in Music and released in 1999 by Rhino Records, included this song on the last of its 5-disc set; the disc was labelled "Hip-Hop, Pop, and Passion". "Silent All These Years" appears between songs by Sinéad O'Connor and k.d. lang.

This song was one of sixteen to get a remastering treatment for inclusion on Tales of a Librarian, Amos's 2003 collection.

Asian diva Faye Wong covered the song in both Cantonese and Mandarin. Her version is called "Cold War" (冷戰). Singaporean singer Stefanie Sun also covered the original English version. Hong Kong singer-songwriter Chet Lam covered this song featuring Kay Tse in his 2006 concert album CAMPiNG iN Hong Kong.

== Critical reception ==
Melody Maker wrote, "Noble. The way she sings the words "boy, you better pray that I bleed real soon" will send little shivers from the tip of your head right down to your heels." The reviewer added, "Without the screeching and the bluster, with just a piano for company, it will make you realise just how great a song it is. It will also make you feel a little stupid that you've been singing nowhere near the right lyrics for the last nine months." The magazine's Chris Roberts complimented the "genuine clever narratives" of "Silent All These Years". Ian McCann from New Musical Express said, "Her voice makes me shiver, it's all hurt and nutty. On 'Silent' she hears it herself, she reckons, and goes on about a bloke's jeans. People like this should be locked up or given a spell in the marines. They're just too sensitive for their own good." In 2014, Stereogum ranked the song number seven on their list of the 10 greatest Tori Amos songs, and in 2023, The Guardian ranked the song number one on their list of the 20 greatest Tori Amos songs.

== Music video ==
The accompanying music video for "Silent All These Years" was the first of Amos's solo career. It was shot by Cindy Palmano over the course of two days. Palmano, who had been a stills photographer until this project, came up with the idea of Amos rolling inside a box, the image which is most often associated with the video. Other images seen at times include a young girl climbing out from behind a broken-down piano, a pair of breast implants suspended from a clothes hanger, and honey being poured, which Palmano describes as having "a modern look, very clean." The video approaches a climax with shots of Amos twirling against an uneven surface, created by using a corner of a room painted such a crisp white that the viewer has difficulty perceiving the walls. For the final seconds, Amos's face fills the frame as she simply sings to the camera.

The video for "Silent All These Years" was well-noted by the mass media. MTV, in March 1992, used "Silent All These Years" as a "Buzz clip". Additionally, the video was nominated for Breakthrough Video, Best Cinematography in a Video, Best New Artist in a Video, and Best Female Video at the MTV Video Music Awards in 1992. Rolling Stone magazine lists this video at #98 of the 100 greatest videos of all time.

The video has been released on two compilations: the Little Earthquakes VHS and Tori Amos: Complete Videos 1991–1998.

== Track listings ==
The November 1991 CD and 12-inch are identical except for title to the same singles for "Me and a Gun", released in October 1991.

=== November 1991 U.K. release ===
- Cassette single (EastWest YZ 618C) / 7-inch single (EastWest YZ 618)
1. "Silent All These Years" – 4:11
2. "Me and a Gun" – 3:42
- CD single (EastWest YZ 618CD) / 12-inch single (EastWest YZ 618T)
1. "Silent All These Years" – 4:11
2. "Upside Down" – 4:22
3. "Me and a Gun" – 3:42
4. "Thoughts" – 2:36

=== April 1992 U.S. release ===
- Cassette single (Atlantic 4-87511)
1. "Silent All These Years" – 4:11
2. "Upside Down" – 4:22

=== August 1992 U.K. release ===
- Cassette single (EastWest A 7433C) / 7-inch single (EastWest A 7433)
1. "Silent All These Years" – 4:11
2. "Smells Like Teen Spirit" – 3:15
- CD single no. 1 (EastWest A 7433CD)
1. "Silent All These Years" – 4:11
2. "Upside Down" – 4:22
3. "Me and a Gun" – 3:42
4. "Thoughts" – 2:36
- CD single no. 2 (EastWest A 7433CDX)
1. "Silent All These Years" – 4:11
2. "Ode to the Banana King (Part One)" – 4:06
3. "Song for Eric" – 1:50
4. "Happy Phantom" (Live) – 3:33 (Recorded at Cambridge Corn Exchange, April 5, 1992)

=== March 1997 U.S. release ===
- RAINN Benefit CD single (Atlantic 2-83001) / RAINN Benefit Cassette single (Atlantic 4-83001)
1. "Silent All These Years" – 4:11
2. "Silent All These Years" (live version) – 5:28 (Recorded at Madison Square Garden, January 23, 1997)

== Charts ==
Chart (1991)	Position
UK Singles (Official Charts)	51
UK Airplay (Music Week)	35

Chart (1992)	Position
Australia (ARIA)	128
Europe (Eurochart Hot 100)	65
UK Singles (Official Charts)	26
UK Airplay (Music Week)	50
US Alternative Airplay (Billboard)	27

Chart (1997)	Position
US Billboard Hot 100	65
US Adult Pop Airplay (Billboard)	24

== Release history ==
Region	Date	Format(s)	Label(s)	Ref.
United Kingdom	November 1991	7-inch vinyl; 12-inch vinyl; CD; cassette	EastWest	
Australia	February 3, 1992	CD; cassette	EastWest	
United States	April 1992	Cassette	Atlantic	
Japan	April 25, 1992	Mini-CD	EastWest	
United Kingdom (re-release)	August 10, 1992	7-inch vinyl; CD; cassette	EastWest	
United States (re-release)	January 27, 1997	Alternative radio	Atlantic	
United States (re-release)	January 28, 1997	Contemporary hit radio	Atlantic	
United States (re-release)	March 1997	CD; cassette	Atlantic	
