= Me and a Gun =

1991 single by Tori Amos

Single by Tori Amos

from the album Little Earthquakes
- A-side: "Silent All These Years"
- B-side: "Upside Down"; "Thoughts"
- Released: October 21, 1991
- Genre: A cappella
- Length: 3:42
- Label: Atlantic; EastWest
- Songwriter: Tori Amos
- Producers: Tori Amos; Eric Rosse

Tori Amos singles chronology
"Cool on Your Island" (1988)	"Me and a Gun" (1991)	"Silent All These Years" (1991)

"Me and a Gun" is a song by American singer-songwriter and musician Tori Amos. It was released as the first single from her debut studio album Little Earthquakes (1992) and is her debut single under the name Tori Amos. It was released on October 21, 1991 by Atlantic Records in North America and EastWest Records in the UK.

== Background ==
The song is three minutes and 44 seconds long. Amos wrote the song about being raped in Los Angeles when she was 21. After she performed at a bar, a patron asked her if he could have a ride home. She obliged, and he raped her at knifepoint. Years later, in London, she saw the film Thelma & Louise and was stirred.

Amos discussed the attack in a 1994 interview:

"I'll never talk about it at this level again but let me ask you. Why have I survived that kind of night, when other women didn't?

How am I alive to tell you this tale when he was ready to slice me up? In the song I say it was 'Me and a Gun' but it wasn't a gun. It was a knife he had. And the idea was to take me to his friends and cut me up, and he kept telling me that, for hours. And if he hadn't needed more drugs I would have been just one more news report, where you see the parents grieving for their daughter.

And I was singing hymns, as I say in the song, because he told me to. I sang to stay alive. Yet I survived that torture, which left me urinating all over myself and left me paralyzed for years. That's what that night was all about, mutilation, more than violation through sex.

I really do feel as though I was psychologically mutilated that night and that now I'm trying to put the pieces back together again. Through love, not hatred. And through my music. My strength has been to open again, to life, and my victory is the fact that, despite it all, I kept alive my vulnerability."

When released as a single, the track was not the A-side: "Silent All These Years", another song from Little Earthquakes, was the first track, with "Me and a Gun" appearing third (or as the B-side on the 7" release). "Silent All These Years" was a more accessible song, and radio stations began to play that instead. Ultimately the single was re-released with nearly identical packaging but retitled as Silent All These Years.

Amos made a habit of singing this song during live appearances. In 1994, the DC Rape Crisis Center awarded her a Visionary award for the song and the co-creation of RAINN. Amos stopped singing the song live in December 2001 and did not sing it live again until September 2007 (with the exception of one performance in Istanbul in August 2005).

== Relation to rape myths ==
The lyrics of "Me and a Gun" address the rape myth where some people believe that a woman who dresses in revealing clothes is somehow responsible for her rape. Amos acknowledges wearing a revealing red top and challenges her rapist with the question of whether this made him think she deserved to be raped. A survey of thousands of Amos listeners revealed that only about 6% of the Amos listeners believed this myth as compared to 26% of the general population. This was the rape myth most rejected by Amos listeners, but the survey went on to analyze the attitudes of Amos listeners to other rape myths as well. All rape myths were rejected more strongly—to varying degrees—by Amos listeners than by the general population.

== Later appearances of the song ==
- Trance pioneers Salt Tank sampled the line "Do you know Carolina, where the biscuits are soft and sweet" on their 1996 release "Eugina."
- A VHS video of music videos and live performances was released in 1992; it was also called Little Earthquakes. Amos sings "Me and a Gun" in an appearance on MTV Asia.
- Amos performs "Me and a Gun" on the video Tori Amos: Live from New York, a recording of the 1997 RAINN benefit concert.
- During 1997, a CD called Tori Amos the benefit for RAINN [sic] (Atlantic #PRCD 6995-2) was given out during several promotions in order to raise money for RAINN. An audio version of the above live concert version was released on this two-track CD. (The other track was the album version of "Putting the Damage On.")
- In 1999, the song was featured on an MTV compilation called Fight for Your Rights: Take a Stand Against Violence.
- "Me and a Gun" is also included on A Tori Amos Collection: Tales of a Librarian.
- While performed for her stint on MTV Unplugged, "Me and a Gun" was cut from the final airing of the show. Clips of this performance surfaced on the MTV special Hips, Lips and Genderbenders: MTV's History of Sex, but it has otherwise remained unreleased.
- On November 6, 2007, during a concert in Chicago on her ADP tour, Amos performed "Me and a Gun" as Pip with her backing band, using a knife and gun as props. This marked the first time she sang the song with instrumentation. The performance was considered especially controversial, with Amos dancing to the instrumentation in a sexual but angry manner. Pip was considered the angriest of her ADP alter egos. Amos, who was raped at knifepoint, opened her legs and used the knife prop to simulate her rapist's penis entering her, provoking great shock from most of her audience who were used to the song being performed in a very different way. Amos also used the gun to point at her audience, causing some in the audience to fear she might actually fire it in anger during the performance, although she did not.
- On November 12–14 and 17, 2011, during her Night of Hunters tour, Amos performed "Me and a Gun" for all four of her South Africa concerts.
- On June 16, 2022, during her Ocean to Ocean tour, Amos performed "Me and a Gun" as part of the solo section during the penultimate show of the US leg in Los Angeles.

== Covers and remixes ==
- Fan remixes of this track exist; however, no official club or house remix exists. It was remastered for the album Tales of a Librarian.
- Rock band Stabbing Westward covered the song in 1996 during a live concert.
- Amanda Palmer covered the song live on September 12, 2009.

== Track listing ==
CD single and 12" single

1. "Silent All These Years" – 4:11
2. "Upside Down" – 4:22
3. "Me and a Gun" – 3:42
4. "Thoughts" – 2:36

Tracks 1 & 3 are from the album. Track 2 also appeared on the single for "Winter". Track 4 was otherwise unavailable until it was remastered and released on the deluxe reissue of Little Earthquakes in 2015.

7" single

1. "Silent All These Years" – 4:11
2. "Me and a Gun" – 3:42
