= Katherine Arnold Price =

Irish poet and writer (1893–1989)

- Born: 1893; County Mayo
- Died: 1989 (aged 95–96); Dublin
- Education: Trinity College Dublin

Katherine Arnold Price (1893–1989), was an Irish poet and writer.

== Biography ==
Price was born in County Mayo and grew up in County Limerick. She was from a Church of Ireland family. Her grandfather was Thomas Arnold who had been a professor of English in the Catholic University in Dublin. Her great-grandfather was also Thomas Arnold, a headmaster of Rugby College in Britain. He was known for his reforming of the school. Price attended Trinity College in Dublin where she got a bachelor's degree in English and French in 1927. Price then spent a year studying in King's College London before moving for another year to the University of Lyon. She also travelled often.

Price moved to Delgany in Ireland, where her grandparents had lived. Her final residence was in Dublin. Price focused on music and archeology. She wrote poetry and prose but was not widely published during her life. Her two books were published late in life. She spent thirty years working on one of her poems, Curithir and Liadain, the retelling of a 9th-century romance.
