= Clement Robertson =

South African-born British soldier

Clement Robertson VC
- Born: 15 December 1890; Pietermaritzburg, Colony of Natal
- Died: 4 October 1917 (aged 26); Polygon Wood, Broodseinde, Passchendaele salient, Belgium
- Burial place: Oxford Road Cemetery, Ypres, Belgium
- Military career
- Allegiance: United Kingdom
- Branch: British Army
- Rank: Captain
- Units: The Queen's (Royal West Surrey Regiment) (Attached Tank Corps)
- Wars: World War I: Western Front; Battle of Messines; Battle of Passchendaele; Battle of Broodseinde †
- Awards: Victoria Cross

Clement Robertson VC (15 December 1890 – 4 October 1917) was a Colony of Natal-born, recipient of the Victoria Cross, the highest and most prestigious award for gallantry in the face of the enemy that can be awarded to British and Commonwealth forces.

His posthumous Victoria Cross was the first to be awarded to the Tank Corps.

== Early life ==
Clement was the fourth son of Major John Albert Robertson and Frances Octavia Caroline Robertson (née Wynne), of Struan Hill, Delgany in County Wicklow. His father, an officer in the Royal Artillery, was serving in the Colony of Natal when Clement was born at Pietermaritzburg, South Africa, on 15 December 1890. (Note: His school Haileybury has "Born 15th November 1889") His mother's family was from Ireland and Clement grew up in Delgany.

He went to school at Haileybury College (1904–1906) before attending Trinity College Dublin to study engineering. After graduation in 1909, he went to Egypt to work as an engineer on a Nile irrigation project.

== Military career ==
On the outbreak of the First World War he returned to England and on 8 October 1914, he enlisted in 19th (Service) Battalion (2nd Public Schools), Royal Fusiliers. He was commissioned in The Queen's (Royal West Surrey Regiment) in January 1915. Robertson was attached to the Royal Engineers from June 1916 to February 1917, then to the Heavy Branch, Machine Gun Corps (the Heavy Branch became the Tank Corps).

On 7 June 1917, at the Battle of Messines, his Mark IV tank was hit by a shell, which killed a sergeant and wounded two other crew. Although his tank was badly damaged, he brought it back to base.

He was 26 years old, and an acting captain in the Royal West Surrey Regiment, British Army, attached to A Battalion, Tank Corps during the Battle of Broodseinde when the following deed took place for which he was awarded a Victoria Cross.

On 4 October 1917 at Zonnebeke, Belgium, Robertson was involved in the attack by the 21st Division between Polygon Wood and the Menin Road. The attack was supported by the four tanks of 12 Section, A Battalion, with Robertson as section commander. Robertson and his batman, Cyril Sheldon Allen, had spent the previous three days and nights reconnoitring the ground and marking routes with tape, and, during the attack, he led his tanks into action on foot. Fire from German pillboxes caused heavy casualties as they advanced through the muddy conditions of what had been the stream of the Polygonbeek. With the support of one of the tanks the pillboxes were captured and the higher ground overlooking the Reutel valley was reached by the supporting British infantry.

The citation reads:

2nd Lieutenant Clement Robertson, late R.W. Surrey R., Special Reserve (T./Lieutenant, A./Captain, Tank Corps).

For most conspicuous bravery in leading his Tanks in attack under heavy shell, machine-gun and rifle fire, over ground which had been heavily ploughed by shell fire. Captain Robertson, knowing the risk of the Tanks missing the way, continued to lead them on foot, guiding them carefully and patiently towards their objective, although he must have known that his action would almost inevitably cost him his life.

This gallant officer was killed after his objective had been reached, but his skilful leading had already ensured successful action.

His utter disregard of danger and devotion to duty afford an example of outstanding valour.

As he had not married, his VC was presented to his mother by Brigadier General C. Williams CB at the Royal Barracks, Dublin, on 27 March 1918.

He is "believed to be buried" at Oxford Road Commonwealth War Graves Commission Cemetery, 2 miles (3 kilometres) north-east of Ypres, in Plot III, Row F, Grave 7. His headstone bears the Latin inscription VIRTUTIS GLORIA MERCES; "glory is the reward of virtue".

Private Allen, who had accompanied Robertson on foot, was awarded the Distinguished Conduct Medal; he was killed on 20 November 1917.

== Memorials ==
Robertson is also commemorated:

- in his Church of Ireland parish church, Christ Church, at Delgany, County Wicklow
- in Delgany Golf Club; he and his four brothers were founder members of the club and he won the Captain's Prize in the first year it was played for, in 1908
- on one of the panels on the walls of the entrance hall of the 1937 Reading Room, Front Square, Trinity College Dublin
- plaque and Royal Tank Regiment flag at Merlijn Restaurant at Reutel Crossroads, Beselare . The restaurant also produces a wine that commemorates him and his remarkable achievements on the battlefield named "Victory"
- bridge over Reutelbeek upgraded to Memorial Status and named "Robertson's Bridge" in October 2017
- at Glasnevin Cemetery, Dublin; one of four Victoria Cross Commemorative Stones unveiled on Armistice Day 2017 in honour of Irish men who received the VC in the First World War
