= Cruel (Tori Amos song) =

- US and Canada "Cruel" single

Single by Tori Amos

from the album From the Choirgirl Hotel
- Released: November 24, 1998
- Recorded: 1998
- Studio: Martian Engineering (Cornwall)
- Genre: Trip hop; electronica
- Length: 4:07
- Label: Atlantic
- Songwriter: Tori Amos
- Producer: Tori Amos

Tori Amos singles chronology
| "Jackie's Strength" (1998) | "Cruel" / "Raspberry Swirl" (1998) | "Bliss" (1999) |

"Cruel" is a song written and performed by American singer-songwriter and pianist Tori Amos. It was released as the third single from her fourth studio album From the Choirgirl Hotel (1998). In the United States it was released as a double A-side single with "Raspberry Swirl", off the same album.

== Track listings ==
"Cruel" was released in the United States and Canada as a double A-side with "Raspberry Swirl".

=== US and Canada CD single ===
1. "Cruel" (Shady Feline Mix) – 3:51
2. "Raspberry Swirl (Lip Gloss Version) – 3:41
3. "Ambient Raspberry Swirl" (Scarlet Spectrum Feels) – 8:10
4. "Mainline Cherry" (Ambient Spark) – 5:11

=== US 7" vinyl single (Atlantic 7-84412) ===
1. "Raspberry Swirl" (Lip Gloss Version) – 3:39
2. "Cruel" (Shady Feline Mix) – 3:49

== Charts ==
| Year | Chart | Position |
|---|---|---|
| 1998 | Billboard Hot 100 Single Sales (US) | 38 |
