= Cool on Your Island =

Single by Y Kant Tori Read

from the album Y Kant Tori Read
- B-side: "Heart Attack at 23"; "A Groovy Kind of Love"
- Released: 1988
- Genre: Synth-pop
- Length: 4:57
- Label: Atlantic
- Songwriters: Tori Amos; Kim Bullard
- Producer: Joe Chiccarelli

Y Kant Tori Read singles chronology
"The Big Picture" (1988)	"Cool on Your Island" (1988)	"Me and a Gun" (1991)

"Cool on Your Island" is a song by American synth-pop band Y Kant Tori Read, commercially released by Atlantic Records in 1988 as a 7" vinyl single and a cassette single. Two versions of a promotional 7" vinyl were also released, one with light blue labels and one with dark blue labels. The song was a commercial failure and received absolutely no critical comment. After the failure of the first single by the band, the label did not feel expenses were warranted to film a music video.

The promotional 7" vinyl singles feature a double A-side of an edited version of the track. There was also a promotional CD single issued for the Phil Collins song "A Groovy Kind of Love". Inexplicably it featured "Cool on Your Island" as tracks 2 and 3; the album and edit versions. The track would go on to be a favorite for Amos to perform at live concerts later in her career.

Amos has told a story on The Rosie O'Donnell Show regarding an incident where the release of this single may have kept her out of harm. She states that between the failure of Y Kant Tori Read and her successful solo career she was detained by German police while travelling because a friend (and co-traveller) had marijuana on her person. When the police were interrogating her, she stated she was a musician and that she had been "on a record with Phil Collins". As he was extremely popular there at the time, she was set free.

== Track listing ==
7" single (Atlantic 7-89021) and cassette single (Atlantic 89021-4)

1. "Cool on Your Island" – 4:57
2. "Heart Attack at 23" – 5:16

7" promo single (Atlantic 7-89021)

1. "Cool on Your Island" (edit) – 4:05
2. "Cool on Your Island" (edit) – 4:05

CD promo single (Atlantic PR2452)

1. "A Groovy Kind of Love" by Phil Collins – 3:25
2. "Cool on Your Island" (edit) – 4:05
3. "Cool on Your Island" (LP version) – 4:57
