= From the Choirgirl Hotel =

Studio album by Tori Amos
- Released: May 5, 1998
- Recorded: September 1997 – February 1998
- Studios: Martian Engineering, Cornwall, England
- Genres: Art rock; art pop; alternative rock; trip hop; techno; industrial; electronica
- Length: 54:11
- Label: Atlantic
- Producer: Tori Amos

Tori Amos chronology
Boys for Pele (1996)	From the Choirgirl Hotel (1998)	To Venus and Back (1999)

Singles from From the Choirgirl Hotel
- 1. "Spark" Released: April 20, 1998; 2. "Jackie's Strength" Released: September 15, 1998; 3. "Cruel"/"Raspberry Swirl" Released: November 24, 1998

From the Choirgirl Hotel is the fourth studio album by American singer-songwriter and pianist Tori Amos. It was released on May 5, 1998, on Atlantic Records. The album was Amos's first to be recorded at her own Martian Engineering Studios in Cornwall, England and was self-produced, with the mixing being handled by longtime collaborators Marcel van Limbeek and Mark Hawley, whom she had married in early 1998.

In contrast with the sparse, minimalist sound of Amos's previous albums, From the Choirgirl Hotel features a greater emphasis on full band arrangements. Additionally, the album sees Amos integrate elements of electronica, trip hop, and dance music. The album marks the first appearance of Matt Chamberlain on drums; he has gone on to contribute to the majority of Amos's albums ever since.

From the Choirgirl Hotel was commercially and critically successful. It peaked at number 5 in the US, becoming Amos's second straight top ten album in her home country, and reached number 6 in the UK. "Spark", the album's lead single, reached number 49 on the Billboard Hot 100, her highest position on the chart. Two further singles—"Jackie's Strength" and "Raspberry Swirl" / "Cruel"—were released, with the former reaching the top of the US Hot Dance Club Play chart. The album garnered two Grammy nominations – one for Best Alternative Music Performance, and another for Best Female Rock Vocal Performance (for "Raspberry Swirl"). Amos promoted the album with the "Plugged '98" tour, her first with a full band. Performances from the tour were included on the live disc of her next release, To Venus and Back. In a 2026 interview with Exclaim!, Amos confirmed that a vinyl reissue was in progress.

== Background ==
The album began recording in September 1997, with mastering complete by early February 1998. Following the trend set by 1996's Boys for Pele, Amos allowed several songs from the album to be remixed. Remixes of both "Raspberry Swirl" and "Jackie's Strength" were club hits. The album's theme dealt very closely with the first two in Amos's series of three miscarriages between 1996 and 1999.

Thematically and conceptually, the "choirgirl hotel" of the title refers to the fictional, imaginary place where the songs "live". Amos pointed out that although the songs are recorded, they are also alive themselves – they can be re-modeled and reshaped in concert. Amos imagined the songs as living their own lives, all checking into the "choirgirl hotel" (i.e., the album) but living separate lives. In the artwork, Amos included a hand-drawn map detailing the stomping ground of these songs.

The album artwork was created by the UK-based photographer, Katerina Jebb. The artwork features full-body color photocopies of Amos (in various couture outfits) as scanned by a human-sized photocopier.

== Critical reception ==
Professional ratings
Review scores
Source	Rating
AllMusic	4.5/5 stars
Chicago Sun-Times	3.5/4 stars
Entertainment Weekly	B+
The Guardian	4/5 stars
Los Angeles Times	3/4 stars
NME	6/10
Pitchfork	6.7/10
Q	4/5 stars
Rolling Stone	4/5 stars
Spin	8/10

John Aizlewood in Q. " From the Choirgirl Hotel is, by any reasonable yardstick, a glorious coming of age."

== Track listing ==
All tracks are written by Tori Amos.

No.	Title	Length
1.	"Spark"	4:13
2.	"Cruel"	4:07
3.	"Black-Dove (January)"	4:38
4.	"Raspberry Swirl"	3:58
5.	"Jackie's Strength"	4:26
6.	"i i e e e"	4:07
7.	"Liquid Diamonds"	6:21
8.	"She's Your Cocaine"	3:42
9.	"Northern Lad"	4:19
10.	"Hotel"	5:19
11.	"Playboy Mommy"	4:08
12.	"Pandora's Aquarium"	4:45
13.	"Purple People" (Japanese edition bonus track)	4:12

Notes

- The track "Merman" was released as a pre-order bonus track.

=== B-sides ===
Like Amos's previous Atlantic albums, several songs recorded during the From the Choirgirl Hotel sessions were released as B-sides, and introduced into Amos's live performance repertoire. "Cooling", "Never Seen Blue", and "Beulah Land" were originally written and recorded for 1996's Boys for Pele album. Several tracks from a demo CD for the album leaked online in 2010, including "Violet's Eyes". Parts of this song evolved into "Almost Rosey" and "Miracle" from 2007's American Doll Posse.

B-side title	Single
"Purple People"	"Spark" (1998) and Japanese edition bonus track of the album
"Bachelorette"	"Spark" (1998) and Japanese edition bonus track of the album
"Have Yourself a Merry Little Christmas"	"Spark" (UK CD1) (1998)
"Do It Again"	"Spark" (UK CD2) (1998)
"Cooling"	"Spark" (UK CD2) (1998) (Recorded during Boys for Pele sessions)
"Never Seen Blue"	"Jackie's Strength" (US) (1998) (Recorded during Boys for Pele sessions)
"Beulah Land"	"Jackie's Strength" (US) (1998) (Recorded during Boys for Pele sessions)
"Merman"	No Boundaries: A Benefit for the Kosovar Refugees (1998) and was released as a pre-order bonus track.
"Violet's Eyes"	unreleased, leaked in 2010

== Personnel ==
- Tori Amos – Bösendorfer piano, keyboards, vocals
- Steve Caton – acoustic and electric guitar; mandolin on "Black-Dove (January)"
- George Porter Jr., Justin Meldal-Johnsen – bass guitar
- Matt Chamberlain – drums; marimba on "Cruel"
- Andy Gray – programming

with:

- Stewart Boyle – guitar on "Northern Lad"
- Willy Porter – guitar on "Playboy Mommy"
- Al Perkins – steel guitar on "Playboy Mommy"
- Sinfonia of London – on "Jackie's Strength", conducted by David Firman, strings arranged by John Philip Shenale

== Charts ==
=== Weekly charts ===
Chart (1998)	Peak position
Australian Albums (ARIA)	8
Austrian Albums (Ö3 Austria)	11
Belgian Albums (Ultratop Flanders)	13
Canadian Albums (Billboard)	10
Dutch Albums (Album Top 100)	24
European Albums (Eurotipsheet)	8
French Albums (SNEP)	30
German Albums (Offizielle Top 100)	13
Irish Albums (IFPI)	10
New Zealand Albums (RMNZ)	26
Norwegian Albums (VG-lista)	9
Scottish Albums (Official Charts)	11
Swedish Albums (Sverigetopplistan)	26
Swiss Albums (Schweizer Hitparade)	31
UK Albums (Official Charts)	6
US Billboard 200	5

=== Year-end charts ===
Chart (1998)	Position
US Billboard 200	148

== Certifications ==
Region	Certification	Certified units/sales
Canada (Music Canada)	Gold	50,000^{^}
United Kingdom (BPI)	Gold	100,000^{^}
United States (RIAA)	Platinum	1,000,000^{^}
^{^} Shipments figures based on certification alone.
