= Caught a Lite Sneeze =

1996 single by Tori Amos

Single by Tori Amos

from the album Boys for Pele
- B-side: "This Old Man"; "That's What I Like Mick (The Sandwich Song)"; "Graveyard"; "Toodles Mr. Jim"; "Hungarian Wedding Song"; "London Girls"; "Samurai"
- Released: January 1, 1996
- Studio: A church (Delgany, Ireland); A Georgian house (County Cork, Ireland)
- Length: 4:27
- Label: Atlantic; EastWest
- Songwriter: Tori Amos
- Producer: Tori Amos

Tori Amos singles chronology
"Past the Mission" (1994)	"Caught a Lite Sneeze" (1996)	"Talula" (1996)

"Caught a Lite Sneeze" is a song by American singer-songwriter and pianist Tori Amos, released as the first single from her third studio album, Boys for Pele (1996), on January 1, 1996. The song is about wanting to do anything to keep a relationship going, knowing that it is over. It references Nine Inch Nails's album Pretty Hate Machine in the lyrics "Caught a lite sneeze / Dreamed a little dream / Made my own pretty hate machine." On December 11, 1995, Atlantic Records made the song available for streaming on their website, one of the earliest examples of a major label implementing such a feature.

Following the song's release, it reached number 60 on the US Billboard Hot 100, number three on the Billboard Triple-A chart, and No. 20 on the UK singles chart. Despite being one of Amos's higher-charting singles, it does not appear on her best-of collection, Tales of a Librarian (2003). In live performances from 1996 and 1998, Amos would frequently insert lines directly from and inspired by "Hurt", another song by Nine Inch Nails.

== Critical reception ==
Larry Flick from Billboard magazine felt the song "is easily her most viable bid for top 40 success to date." He added, "Literal, accessible lyrics waft over a rumbling rock-ish beat and a haunting blend of acoustic guitars and keyboard. Her often waif-like delivery is enhanced with throaty declarations and vamps that nicely punctuate the melody and flesh out the words. Nourishment for the intelligent pop music fan." Steve Baltin from Cash Box said "Wow", declaring the song as "simply stunning." He wrote, "If not the best singer in music right now, Amos is near the top of a very short list. Time and time again the passionate redhead has proven herself to be a vocalist capable of bringing listeners into her pain."

Baltin explained, "'Caught a Lite Sneeze' begins with a very understated industrial feel and Amos showing great restraint in her vocals. By the end though, Amos has fans trembling with her cathartic rushes. A definite at Modern Rock and a smash at Triple A. The Cash Box psychic predicts that by the end of this year Tori Amos will have broken through to be a true superstar in every sense of the word." Kevin Courtney from Irish Times noted that the song "has a contagious quality of its own." Andrew Mueller from Melody Maker named it Single of the Week, adding, "The song itself is pleasant enough without being what you'd call memorable. The usual Kate Bush references will do the trick, or you could resort to some Alanis Morissette ones if you were feigning contemporaneity."

== Track listings ==
- US maxi-CD single
1. "Caught a Lite Sneeze" (unedited version)
2. "This Old Man"
3. "That's What I Like Mick (The Sandwich Song)"
4. "Graveyard"
5. "Toodles Mr. Jim"
- UK CD1 and Australian CD single
1. "Caught a Lite Sneeze" – 4:24
2. "This Old Man" – 1:44
3. "Hungarian Wedding Song" – 1:00
4. "Toodles Mr. Jim" – 3:09
- UK CD2
1. "Caught a Lite Sneeze" – 4:24
2. "London Girls" – 3:20
3. "That's What I Like Mick (The Sandwich Song)" – 2:59
4. "Samurai" – 3:03
- UK and Australian cassette single, European CD single
1. "Caught a Lite Sneeze" – 4:24
2. "Graveyard" – 0:54
3. "Toodles Mr. Jim" – 3:09

== Credits and personnel ==
Credits are lifted from the Boys for Pele album booklet.

Recording and production

- Recorded at a church (Delgany, Ireland) and "a wonderfully damp Georgian house" (County Cork, Ireland)
- Additionally recorded at The Egyptian Room and Dinosaur Studios (New Orleans, Louisiana)
- Mixed at Jacobs Studios (Surrey, England), Mix This!, and Record One (Los Angeles)
- Mastered at Gateway Mastering (Portland, Maine)

Personnel

- Tori Amos – writing, vocals, harpsichord, Bösendorfer, production
- Alan Friedman – drum programming
- George Porter Jr. – bass
- Steve Caton – swells
- Mark Hawley – recording
- Marcel van Limbeek – recording
- Rob van Tuin – recording assistance
- Bob Clearmountain – mixing
- Ryan Freeland – mixing assistance
- Bob Ludwig – mastering

== Charts ==
=== Weekly charts ===
Chart (1996)	Peak position
Australia (ARIA)	51
Canada Top Singles (RPM)	20
Canada Adult Contemporary (RPM)	27
Canada Rock/Alternative (RPM)	18
Europe (Eurochart Hot 100)	73
Finland (Suomen virallinen lista)	33
Ireland (IRMA)	21
Scottish Singles Sales (Official Charts)	19
UK Singles (Official Charts)	20
US Billboard Hot 100	60
US Adult Alternative Airplay (Billboard)	3
US Alternative Airplay (Billboard)	13
US Dance Singles Sales (Billboard)	9

=== Year-end charts ===
Chart (1996)	Position
US Modern Rock Tracks (Billboard)	70
US Triple-A (Billboard)	27

== Release history ==
Region	Date	Format(s)	Label(s)	Ref.
United Kingdom	January 1, 1996	CD; cassette	EastWest	
United States	January 2, 1996	Modern rock; college; triple A radio	Atlantic	
