= Oxford Road Commonwealth War Graves Commission Cemetery =

World War I cemetery in Belgium

Oxford Road
- Commonwealth War Graves Commission
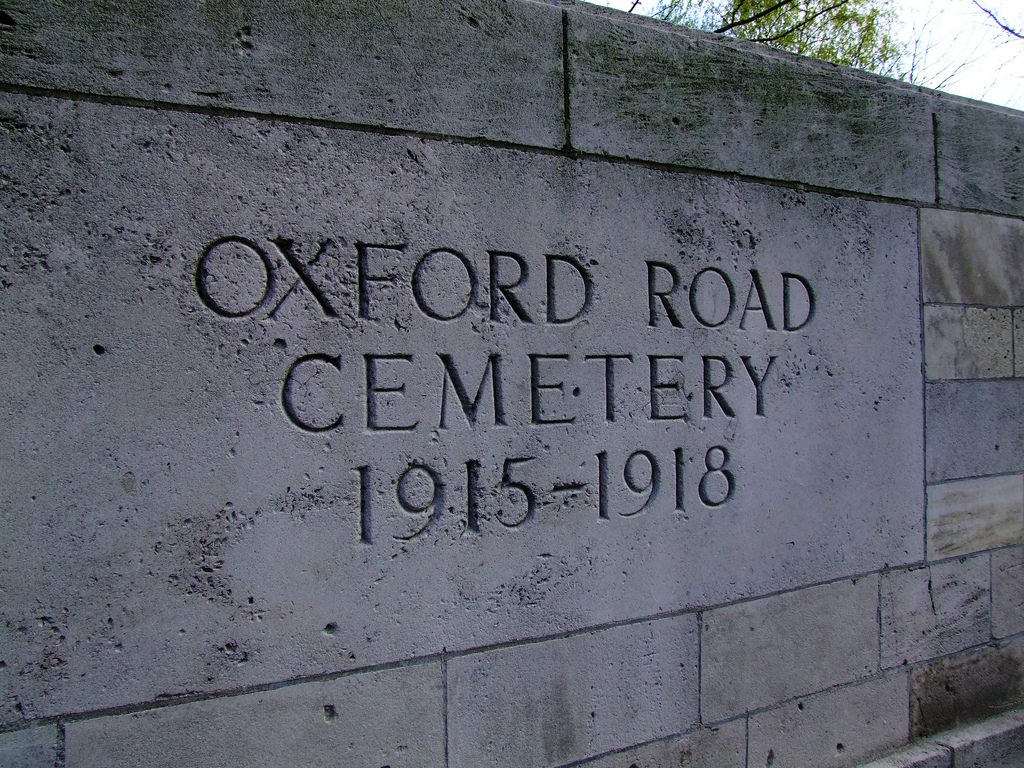
- Used for those deceased 1917–1918
- Established: August 1917
- Location: 50°52′08″N 02°55′00″E near Ypres, West Flanders, Belgium
- Designed by: Sir Reginald Blomfield
- Total burials: 853

Burials by nation
- Allies of World War I: United Kingdom: 657; Australia: 74; Canada: 83; New Zealand: 37; South Africa: 7; Central Powers: Germany: 2

Burials by war
- World War I: 853

Oxford Road Cemetery is a Commonwealth War Graves Commission burial ground for the dead of the First World War located near Ypres (Ieper) in Belgium on the Western Front.

The cemetery grounds were assigned to the United Kingdom in perpetuity by King Albert I of Belgium in recognition of the sacrifices made by the British Empire in the defence and liberation of Belgium during the war.

== Foundation ==
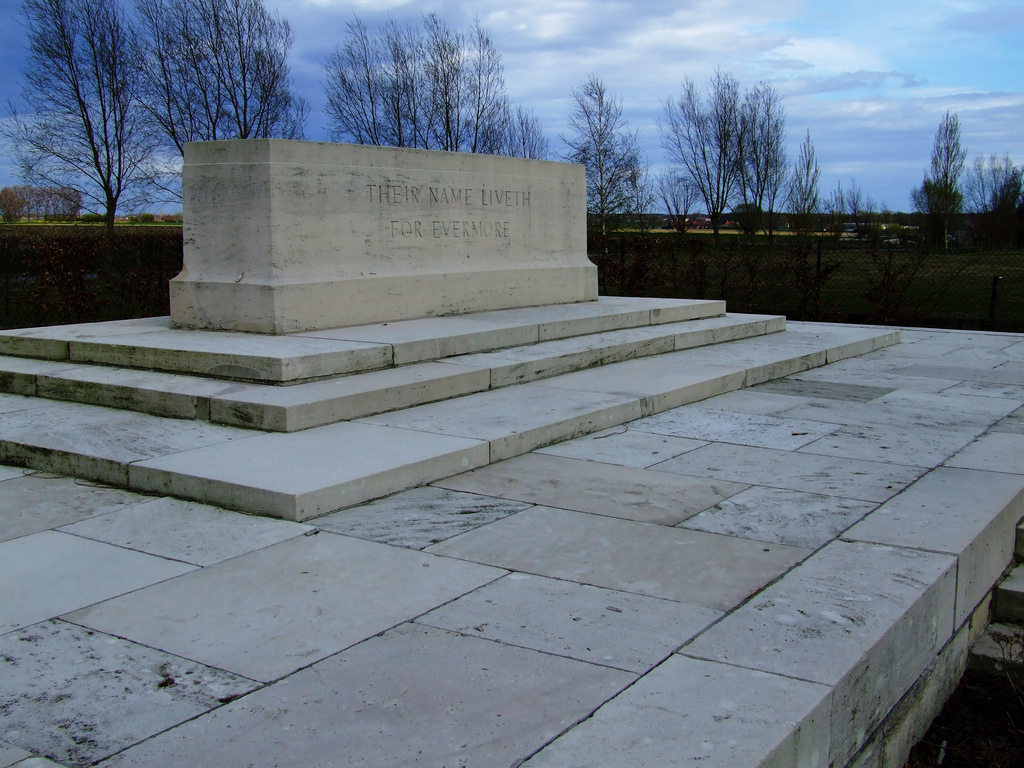
Stone of Remembrance

The cemetery, named after the nickname of a nearby road behind the trenches, was established as two cemeteries. The first was laid down in August 1917. The second, nearby, was begun in 1917. After the armistice, battlefield graves were consolidated between the two, creating one enlarged cemetery.

The cemetery was designed by Sir Reginald Blomfield.

== Notable graves ==
South African-born Captain Clement Robertson VC is buried in this cemetery. He was posthumously awarded the Victoria Cross for valour on 4 October 1917 at Zonnebeke.

Sergeant Colin Blythe of the King's Own Yorkshire Light Infantry, an exceptional spin bowler who had played for Kent and England and was a Wisden Cricketer of the Year in 1904.
