= Y Kant Tori Read =

American rock band (1984–1989)

- (L-R) Brad Cobb, Matt Sorum, Tori Amos, Steve Caton

Background information
- Origin: Los Angeles, California, U.S.
- Genres: Synth-pop; new wave
- Years active: 1984–1989
- Label: Atlantic
- Past members: Tori Amos; Steve Caton; Matt Sorum; Brad Cobb

Y Kant Tori Read was an American synth-pop band fronted by singer-songwriter Tori Amos and active between 1984 and 1989. The band originally consisted of vocalist and keyboardist Amos, guitarist Steve Caton, drummer Matt Sorum (later of Guns N' Roses), bassist Brad Cobb and for a short time, keyboardist Jim Tauber. The band's name comes from an incident in Amos's childhood where she was asked to leave the Peabody Conservatory because she refused to read sheet music.

The band released one album, also called Y Kant Tori Read (1988), which was considered a big commercial failure. Atlantic Records abandoned the album completely after two months of release. The band worked with record producer Joe Chiccarelli and Kim Bullard.

Two singles were released. The first, "The Big Picture", was commercially issued exclusively as a 7" vinyl single, and without a picture sleeve, though the 12" vinyl promo did have one. The second single, "Cool on Your Island", was issued as a cassette single and 7" vinyl single, this time with a picture sleeve; and in various promo 7" vinyl singles. Neither single was successful.

A music video for their song "The Big Picture" was made, but the only member of the band featured was Amos, since by then, unable to withstand pressure from Atlantic Records, she had jettisoned the rest of them with the exception of Steve Caton.

== Discography ==
=== Album ===
- Y Kant Tori Read (1988, 2017 re-release)

==== Re-release ====
The 2017 Rhino Records re-release was made available on streaming services, with an additional limited (4000 copies) vinyl released for Fall 2017 Record Store Day. it was also released as a CD for RSD.

=== Singles ===
- "The Big Picture" (single, 1988)
- "Cool on Your Island" (single, 1988)
