= Jackie's Strength =

- Artwork for 1998 US enhanced CD single

Single by Tori Amos

from the album From the Choirgirl Hotel
- B-side: "Never Seen Blue" "Beulah Land"
- Released: September 15, 1998
- Recorded: 1997
- Studio: Martian Engineering (Cornwall)
- Length: 4:26
- Label: Atlantic
- Songwriter: Tori Amos
- Producer: Tori Amos

Tori Amos singles chronology
"Spark" (1998)	"Jackie's Strength" (1998)	"Cruel/"Raspberry Swirl" (1998)

"Jackie's Strength" is a song by American singer-songwriter and pianist Tori Amos, released as the second single from her fourth studio album From the Choirgirl Hotel (1998). It reached No. 54 on the US Billboard Hot 100 chart. The remix single, released the following year on February 23, 1999, reached number one on the Hot Dance Club Play chart in the US. The lyrics refer to Jackie Onassis, there is also a brief reference to the Kennedy assassination ("Shots rang out, the police came"), though Amos herself explained that the song also concerns her own personal doubts about marriage. Amos reiterated this in an interview with columnist Steven Daly in Rolling Stone (Issue #789; June 25, 1998).

== Background ==
"Jackie's Strength" is really... I was asked to get married, right? And I was quite nervous because I never thought I'd get married before. It just wasn't something that I was gonna do. Even though I believe in monogamy, just having the church and state condone my union wasn't important to me. And in fact, I really didn't want that. So, when he asked me, it brought up, obviously, a lot of things. And I started going back in my little movie in my head, different moments of my life. And I remember my mother telling me that the day Kennedy died, John F. Kennedy, that she put me down, she had to lay me down because her heart started to slow down and she couldn't breathe. And um, all she thought of was Jackie and the strength that it would take Jackie to lead the nation.. which she did. And I really knew that I was gonna need some kind of strength because I'm made up of like two personalities. There's one side of me that could very easily have ended up at the 7-Eleven sitting outside drinking a Slurpee in my wedding dress and just missing the whole thing. And then there's the other one that did make it to the church. So, this song is about the one that drank the Slurpee. She's still out there somewhere.

== Music video ==
The music video, which is in black and white, portrays Amos as a bride on her wedding day. She travels in a taxi cab, hiding from her wedding party as the taxi passes by the church where she is to be married. The video includes imagery of realistic situations such as teen pregnancy, pre-marital sex, interracial relationships and use of medication by elderly persons. It was directed by James Brown (the cinematographer, not funk and soul musician).

== Track listing ==
=== September 1998 US release ===
Cassette single – Atlantic 4-84163

1. "Jackie's Strength" (Edit) – 4:17
2. "Never Seen Blue" – 3:41
3. "Beulah Land" – 2:56

Enhanced CD single – Atlantic 2-84163

1. "Jackie's Strength" (Edit) – 4:17
2. "Never Seen Blue" – 3:41
3. "Beulah Land" – 2:56
4. "Jackie's Strength" (Music Video)
5. "Raspberry Swirl" (Music Video)

=== February 1999 US release ===
Double 12-inch single – Atlantic 0-84442

1. "Jackie's Strength" (Wedding Cake Club Mix) – 8:40
2. "Jackie's Strength" (Wedding Cake Edit) – 4:03
3. "Jackie's Strength" (One Rascal Dub #1) – 6:24
4. "Father Lucifer" (Sylkscreen Remix) – 4:30
5. "Jackie's Strength" (One Rascal Dub #2) – 5:02
6. "Father Lucifer" (Sylkscreen Instrumental) – 4:26
7. "Jackie's Strength" (Wedding Cake Meltdown Mix) – 8:19
8. "Jackie's Strength" (Bonus Beats) – 2:41

CD maxi-single – Atlantic 2-84442

1. "Jackie's Strength" (Wedding Cake Edit) – 4:03
2. "Father Lucifer" (Sylkscreen Remix) – 4:30
3. "Jackie's Strength" (Wedding Cake Club Mix) – 8:40
4. "Jackie's Strength" (One Rascal Dub #1) – 6:24
5. "Father Lucifer" (Sylkscreen Instrumental) – 4:26
6. "Jackie's Strength" (Wedding Cake Meltdown Mix) – 8:19
7. "Jackie's Strength" (One Rascal Dub #2) – 5:02
8. "Jackie's Strength" (Bonus Beats) – 2:41

== Charts ==
=== Weekly charts ===
==== Original version ====
Chart (1998)	Peak position
US Billboard Hot 100	54
US Hot Singles Sales (Billboard)	33

==== Remixed version ====
Chart (1999)	Peak position
US Dance Club Songs (Billboard)	1
US Dance Singles Sales (Billboard)	5

=== Year-end charts ===
Chart (2001)	Position
Canada (Nielsen SoundScan)	169

== Reception ==
More than 10,000 units of the single have been sold as of October 3, 1998. It also peaked at number 33 in Billboard Hot 100 Singles Sales.

== Release history ==
Country	Date	Version	Format	Label	Catalog	Ref.
United States	September 15, 1998	Original	CD	Atlantic	2-84163	
United States	September 15, 1998	Original	Cassette	Atlantic	4-84163	
Canada	September 22, 1998	Original	CD	Atlantic		
United States	February 23, 1999	Remixes	CD	Atlantic	2-84442	
United States	February 23, 1999	Remixes	Double 12"	Atlantic	0-84442	
Canada	March 16, 1999	Remixes	CD	Atlantic	CD 84442	

== See also ==
- List of number-one dance hits (United States)
