= Spark (Tori Amos song) =

1998 single by Tori Amos

- Standard artwork (US CD maxi-single pictured)

Single by Tori Amos

from the album From the Choirgirl Hotel
- B-side: "Purple People"; "Have Yourself a Merry Little Christmas"; "Bachelorette"; "Do It Again"; "Cooling"
- Released: April 20, 1998
- Studio: Martian Engineering (Cornwall)
- Length: 4:12
- Label: Atlantic; EastWest
- Songwriter: Tori Amos
- Producer: Tori Amos

Tori Amos singles chronology
"In the Springtime of His Voodoo" (1996)	"Spark" (1998)	"Jackie's Strength" (1998)

"Spark" is a song by American singer-songwriter and pianist Tori Amos, released by Atlantic and EastWest Records as the first single from Amos' fourth studio album, From the Choirgirl Hotel (1998). It peaked at No. 49 on the US Billboard Hot 100 chart, making it her highest-charting single in the US.

== Background ==
Amos wrote "Spark" after suffering a miscarriage. She discussed the song in an article from Q magazine in May 1998.

"Y'know, once you've felt life in your body, you can't go back to having been a woman that's never carried life. The other thing is feeling something dying inside you and you're still alive. Obviously when it was happening, it was already over, but in my mind, you don't know that it's over yet. You're doing anything, thinking, 'Oh God, maybe if I put a cork up myself, maybe it'll keep this little life in.' That's why in 'Spark', I say, 'She's convinced she could hold back a glacier/But she couldn't keep baby alive.' You just start going insane. There's nothing you can do, so so you surrender and then... start again."

The timing for an Amos release has never been better, as the mainstream has apparently caught up to the singer/songwriter's quirky brand of pop music. She meets fans halfway with this first single from the imminent, much-anticipated new album, From the Choirgirl Hotel, by infusing the song's complex, piano-driven structure with a sticky chorus and ample use of scratchy angst-rock guitars. Amos continues to explore the far regions of her vocal range, yelping and ranting at whim. However, she counters that with welcome softer nuances that serve the song well. Add an insinuating, tribalistic midtempo drum, and you have what could be a major pop breakthrough for this eternal critical darling. – Billboard (April 1998)

== Critical reception ==
British magazine Music Week wrote, "Tori bursts back onto the scene with this powerful first single from her forthcoming album From the Choirgirl Hotel. Her trademark piano is there but the addition of a band, drums, loops and electronic effects add a further dimension. It's a very fine, multi-layered song which will see her first return to the chart since the 'Professional Widow' remix smash."

== Music video ==
Amos requested the video for "Spark" to be directed by James Brown, who originally had a different idea for the video that Amos disliked; she requested wanting something "where a girl has a will to live." The video was shot in Dartmoor, South West England and took three days to finish.

You don't really know what's going to happen to her, but that's not the point. She's trusting her instincts in a way she never has before, she's finding something in herself she never knew even existed. The man who's trying to find me, probably is the driver. You don't really know too much about him, but you know she's got to get away from him. The water shot – it was about an hour and a half. It was 5:30 at night, and the sun was going down. [switches to up-close shot where she wriggles from the blindfold] Here, right here, I'm in a different water tank, and they had me swimming around for a while trying to get close-up shots. [About the overhead shot where we see Amos running along the banks of the river directly after the water sequence] Well, that was my double, right there. She was walking in a forest while I was shooting all this, because it took hours to get those two seconds. I had changes of clothes – I had wet clothes and dry clothes, and in the middle of the forest the girls would stand around me in their parkas and I'm putting the wet clothes on and putting on the muddy clothes to get the right outfit at the right time. Here [the car at the end], these two are brother and sister, and they're in the album artwork, where they look like angels in the artwork, although here they're very much like the Village of the Damned. You don't know what's going to happen to this girl, but she has a will to live.

I really had no idea that I was going to be crawling through a river on my knees in England in the cold, but I started to get into the story and I really believed that this girl, it was about striving, ...she wanted to live so desperately that she would do anything to do that. All you know is this car crash saved her life so the idea "some things that are really horrible", yea they are horrible, but then you move on and then maybe "wow". She was in the back of this trunk, the car crashed, her life is saved because of what you think is a horrible thing normally – a car crash – and then she starts to find a will in herself to strive, to stay alive, she stars believing in her ability to get through. [It was shot] in one of the moors in Dartmoor and that was really mud. [Skeeter] was something special. I think the main thing is you know he's out there looking for her, whether he's one of the Cray brothers or you're not quite sure. But she's finding her way, having to trust her instincts. The truth is I love this director so much, James Brown, from the Apollo 440 video. He turned in a treatment to me that I just said "I love you but this treatment is so not the spirit of this piece ...take me to the water." ...You don't know sometimes where you're gonna go from one minute to the next. Life is that precious and I think people forget that we don't know where we're gonna be in an hour from now. We don't really appreciate that. What I love is that from one second to the next, she doesn't know how she's gonna get through but she's coming through for herself. It was freezing. It was a body double on set who was supposed to go into the river, but she hyperventilated. She was so sweet, she's this amazing athlete but she wouldn't go in. She's a wonderful person and so it was like "ok somebody's gotta do it and we're the only two people with red hair so it's my turn." There's a lot [of symbolism] in the whole video, like a hundred things that James put in as subtext. - MTV Live interview with Carson Daly, 1998

The music video for "Spark" garnered critical acclaim, and was ranked 61st on Slant's "100 Greatest Music Videos of All Time". Sal Ciquemani, from Slant, gave the video a positive review, noting that "Amos’s musical images are potent and rarely sufficiently enhanced by the music video format, but “Spark” is a rare exception, serving as a visual metaphor for the singer’s recent miscarriage. Amos plays a blindfolded kidnap victim who squirms her way out of her captor’s car trunk and must trust her instincts to guide her through a dense forest. Her character tiptoes her way toward a river’s edge, submerging—and subsequently unshackling—herself beneath the murky, amniotic waters. "

== Track listings ==
- US CD and cassette single
1. "Spark" (album version) – 4:12
2. "Purple People" – 3:41
- US maxi-CD single
1. "Spark" – 4:12
2. "Purple People" – 3:41
3. "Bachelorette" – 3:34
- UK CD1 and Australian CD single
1. "Spark" – 4:18
2. "Purple People (Christmas in Space)" – 3:42
3. "Have Yourself a Merry Little Christmas" – 3:42
4. "Bachelorette" – 3:34
- UK CD2
1. "Spark" – 4:17
2. "Do It Again" (Steely Dan) – 6:04
3. "Cooling" – 4:41

== Charts ==
=== Weekly charts ===
Chart (1998)	Peak position
Australia (ARIA)	50
Europe (Eurochart Hot 100)	80
Scotland Singles (OCC)	18
UK Singles (OCC)	16
US Billboard Hot 100	49
US Adult Alternative Airplay (Billboard)	13
US Adult Pop Airplay (Billboard)	32
US Alternative Airplay (Billboard)	13

=== Year-end charts ===
Chart (1998)	Position
US Modern Rock Tracks (Billboard)	57

== Release history ==
Region	Date	Format(s)	Label(s)	Ref(s).
United States	April 7, 1998	Alternative radio	Atlantic	
United Kingdom	April 20, 1998	CD; cassette	Atlantic; EastWest	
United States	May 19, 1998	Contemporary hit radio	Atlantic	
United States	June 9, 1998	CD; maxi-CD	Atlantic	
