= Delgany =

Village in County Wicklow, Ireland

Delgany Deilgne
- Village
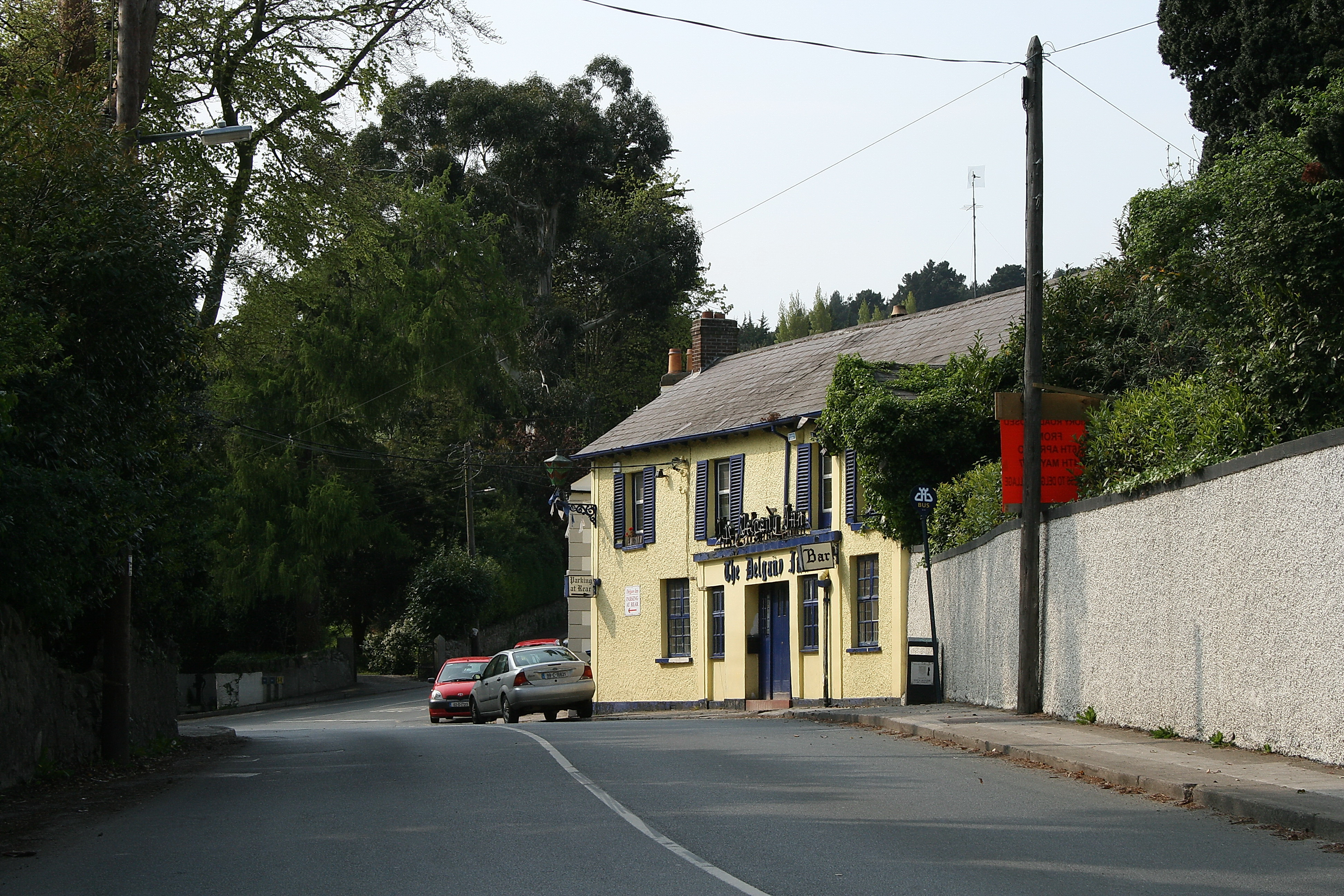
- Delgany on the R762 road

- Location in Ireland
- Coordinates: 53.131°N 6.091°W
- Country: Ireland
- Province: Leinster
- County: Wicklow
- Elevation: 51 m (167 ft)

Population (2006)
  - Urban: 3,068
- Time zone: UTC+0 (WET)
  - Summer (DST): UTC-1 (IST (WEST))
- Irish Grid Reference: O274108

Delgany (Irish: Deilgne, meaning 'thorny place') is a small rural village in County Wicklow in Ireland, located on the R762 road which connects to the N11 road at the Glen of the Downs.

It is about 25 km (16 mi) south of Dublin city centre. While it is an older more rural settlement, it is closely connected to the urban area of Greystones. The area is surrounded by wooded hills (including Kindlestown Wood) and the Glen of the Downs. The village is in a townland and civil parish of the same name.

Delgany has a Church of Ireland parish church which is associated with the nearby Delgany National School. It is also in the Roman Catholic parish of Kilquade and the parish church is in Kilquade about 4 km (2.5 mi) to the south. The local Catholic school is St Laurence's National School which is on Convent Road.

== Heritage ==
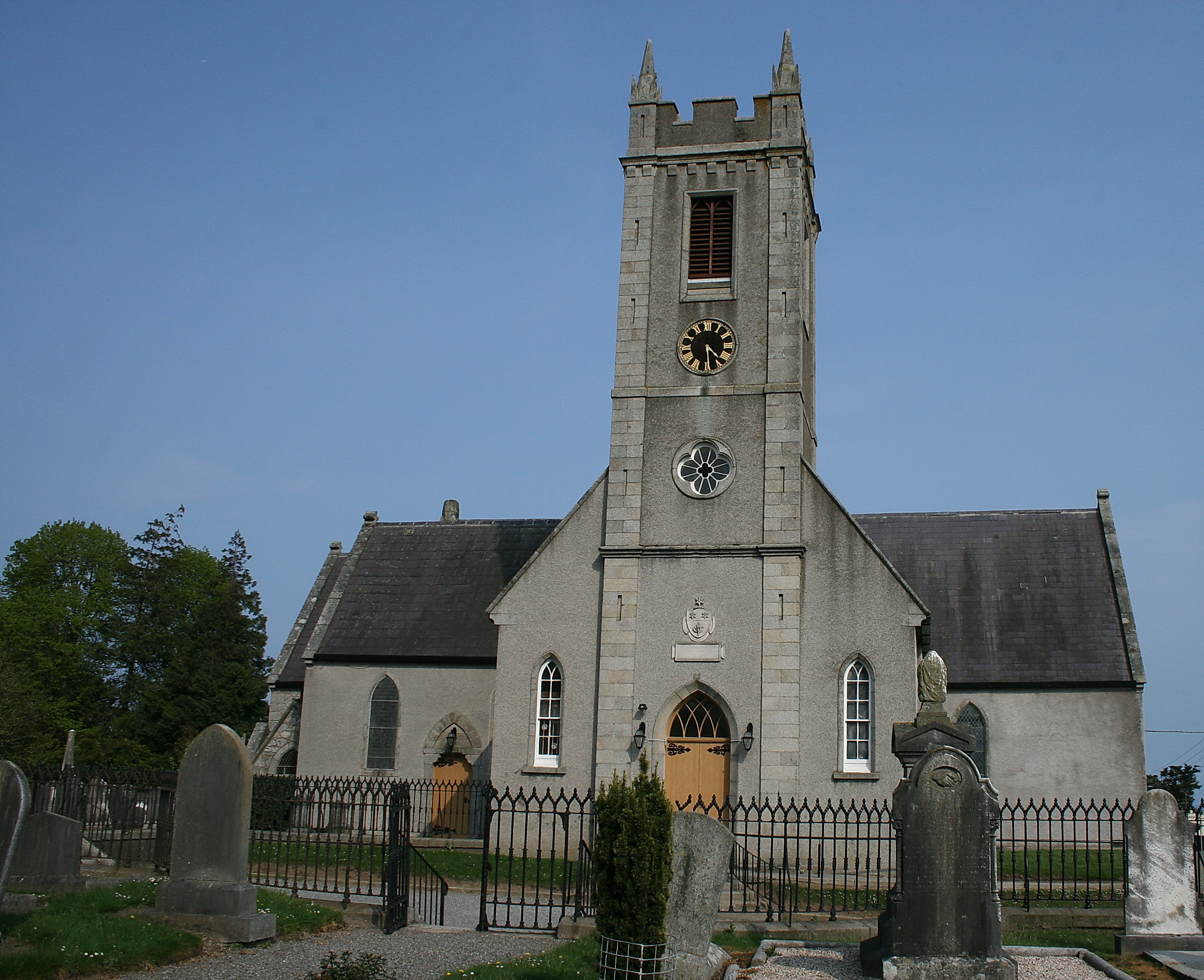
Christ Church (Church of Ireland) in Delgany

The Old Burial Ground is an early Christian settlement dating back to the 7th century. This 1-acre (4,000 m^{2}) site is protected, and contains the ruins of a 13th-century church, the stump of a 6th-century high cross. The latter monumental high cross stands is missing its "head". The surviving granite shaft is however inscribed with a prayer. The ruins of the 13th century church, which was used until 1789, can still be seen. The remaining tombstones in burial ground, dating from at least the 1700s, are mostly in limestone and Wicklow granite. The graveyard has been restored and is open to the public.

A mediaeval castle, possibly dating to the 9th century, appears to have been occupied into the 18th century. Excavation established that the south and west walls represented a replacement wall built in the 19th century. Kindlestown has connections back to the year 1020 with Ugaire, son of Douling, King of Leinster and Citric, Norse King of Dublin.

Originally two thatched houses, they were built in the early 16th century and joined in 1773, on 12½ acres of land. It was once known as The Delgany Inn and later Glenowen. The roof was changed to slate early in the 1900s. Sir Walter Raleigh reputedly stayed in the house.

Christ Church, the Church of Ireland parish church, was built by Peter La Touche at a cost of £5,000 and designed by Whitmore Davis. It was completed in 1789. It is a Gothic-revival building with a steeple rising 30m over the Western entrance, containing a clock and bell. A stone tablet bearing the La Touche family arms is inserted beneath the dial plate of the clock. The interior contains a monument to the memory of David La Touche, Peter's father. Fashioned in white marble, it was executed by the Irish sculptor, John Hickey.

Delgany has been home to a community of Carmelite Nuns since 1844. Due to a historical need, a national school with places for 200 children was opened at the monastery in 1846. Teaching is not a normal activity of a Carmelite monastery, however, due to prevailing circumstances, the nuns became the teachers. The average attendance was 70–100, the fee being 1 penny per week "for those who could afford it". The school remained open until 1896. A new monastery was opened in 2005. The church was built in 1851 and opened on the Feast of St Teresa on 1 October 1853.

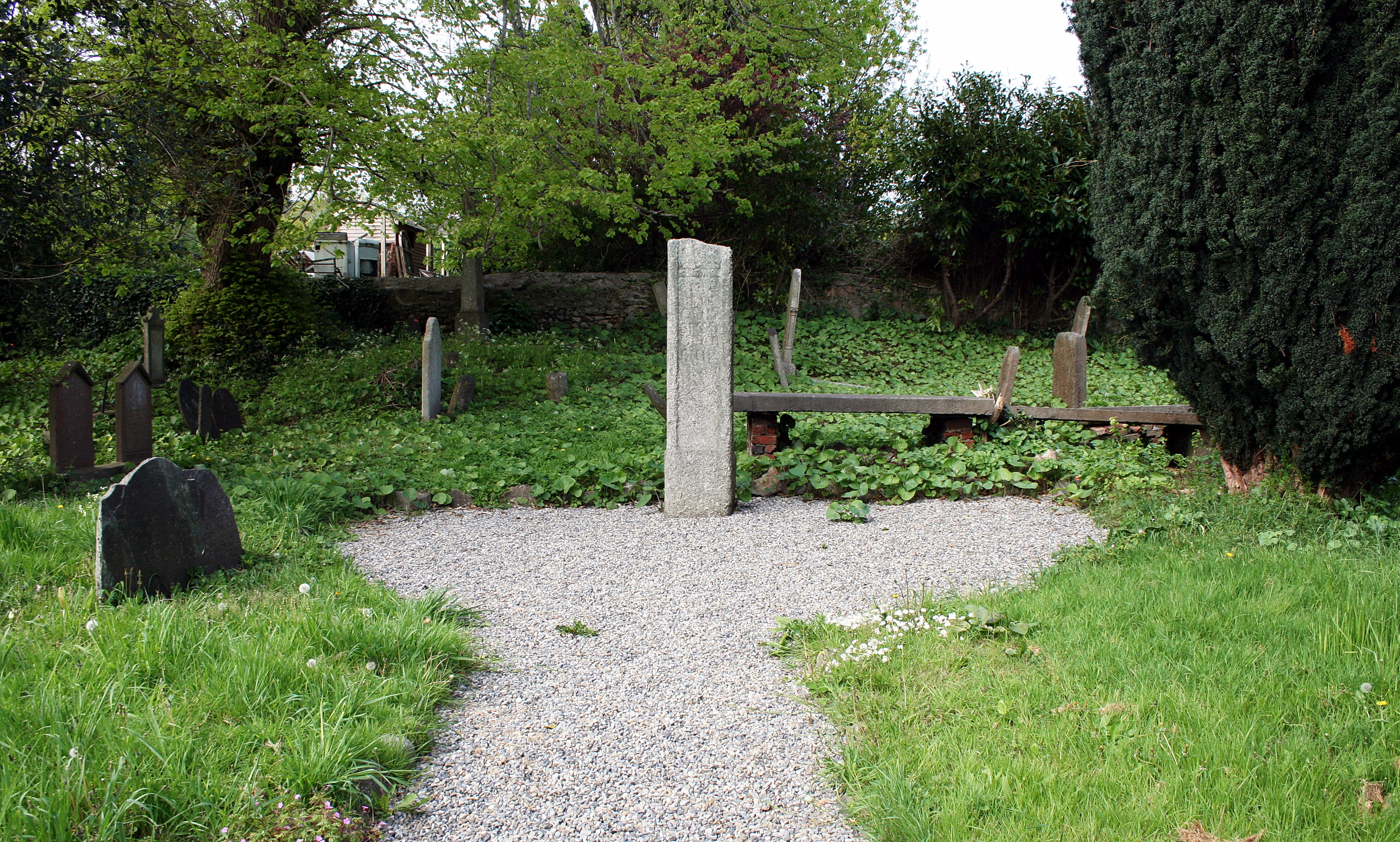
Shaft of monumental high cross inscribed with a prayer for Odran Sair

An advertisement for a directory enquiry company was filmed at the old Patterson's Garage in the area. Several episodes of the television show Moon Boy were filmed in Christ Church. In 1995, it was one of the locations for the recording of Tori Amos' third album Boys For Pele.

== Amenities ==
Delgany is located in a rural area with a number of woodland walks. There are walks through Glen of the Downs nature reserve and Kindlestown Woods nearby, as well as the Delgany Heritage Trail, which includes historical sites such as the Kindlestown Castle ruins and wildlife points.

There are several restaurants and cafés in the village as well as two pubs. One of these pubs is on Convent Road, which is also home to a butcher, a delicatessen, and the local shop.

There are two golf clubs, Delgany Golf Club and the newer Glen of the Downs Golf Club.

Delgany is closely connected to Greystones and has close ties to the sports clubs there including Greystones Rugby Club, Greystones United, Éire Óg Greystones and Greystones Lawn Tennis Club.

Tourist amenities nearby include the south beach in Greystones and Glendalough national park.

== Notable people ==
Born in Delgany:

- Harry Bradshaw – golfer
- Eamonn Darcy – golfer
- Francis Henry Medcalf – Mayor of Toronto (1864–66)
- James Whiteside – lawyer-politician

Residents of Delgany:

- Amy Bowtell – professional tennis player
- Éamon de Buitléar – wildlife filmmaker and naturalist (deceased, 27 January 2013)
- James Rawson Carroll – architect
- John Nelson Darby – evangelical clergyman
- George Hamilton – Irish football commentator
- Janos Köhler – professional cyclist
- Katherine Arnold Price (1893–1989) – Irish poet and writer
- Clement Robertson – VC recipient; (killed, 4 October 1917)
- Jennifer Whitmore – Social Democrats politician

== See also ==
- Bellevue House - now demolished country house in Delgany
