= Steve Caton =

American singer-songwriter

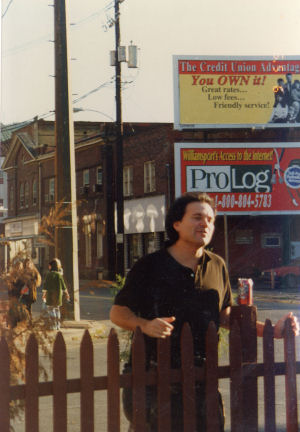
Photo of Steve Caton by James Bradford, circa 1996

Steve Caton is an American musician, songwriter, producer, and visual artist, perhaps best known for a lengthy association with Tori Amos.

== Career ==
Caton's first band experience was as a member of Pegasus in the late 1970s. He first gained widespread attention as the guitarist for Y Kant Tori Read, featuring the then-unknown singer Tori Amos. That band released one self-titled album in 1988. After that band split, Caton served as a session musician for artists in a variety of genres. When Amos went solo in the early 1990s, Caton played on all of her albums and the associated tours until 1999.

Caton also wrote and produced music for movies and television throughout the 1980s and 1990s. He started a band called Binge with Matt Sorum (also a former member of Y Kant Tori Read) in 1997. That band released one album. Caton then moved into a career in graphic arts and video production, particularly for the surfboard industry.

== See also ==
- A Life of Its Own (2002)
