= Consulate General of the United States, Hamburg =

Consulate General of the United States in Hamburg
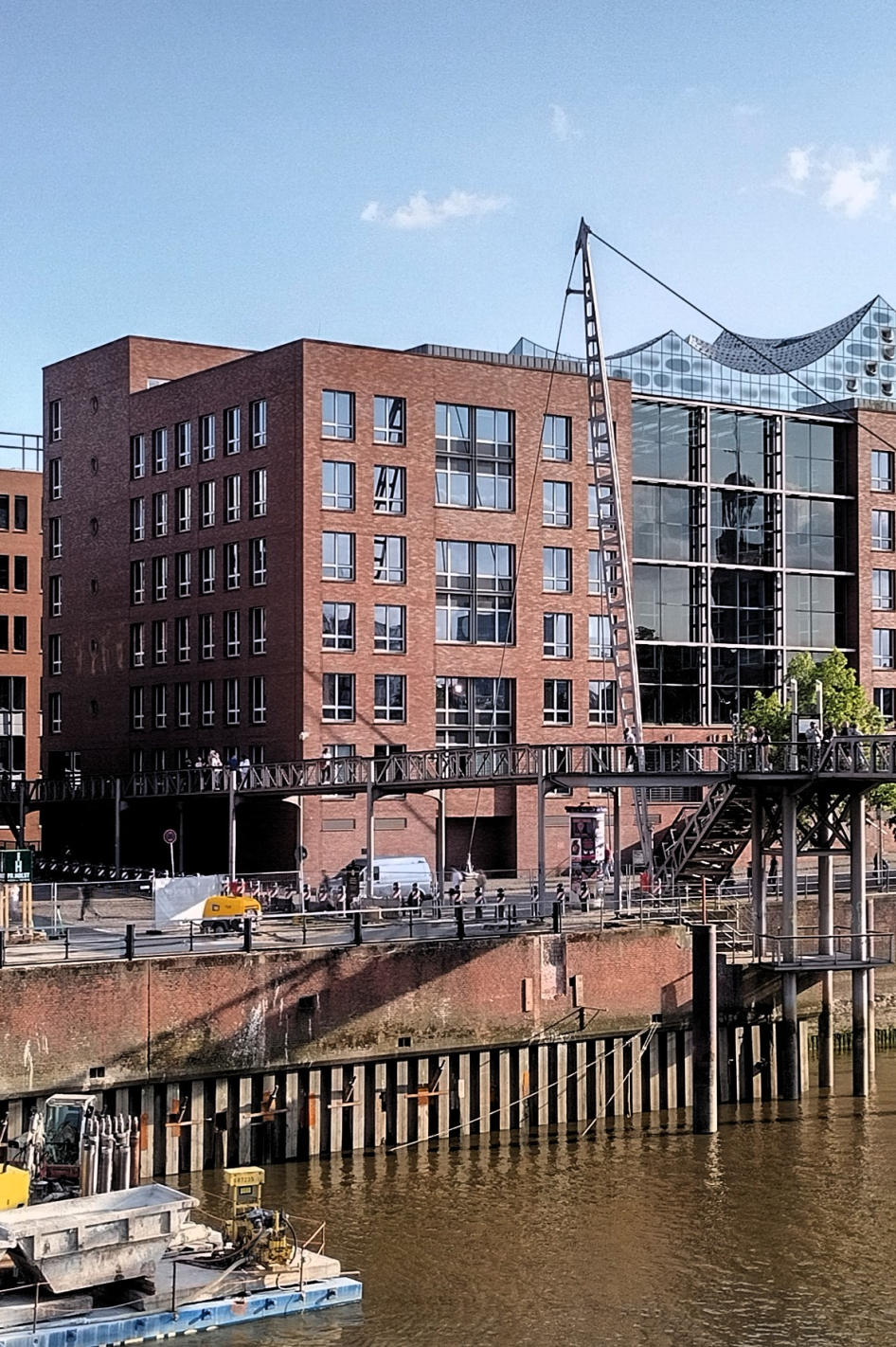
- The current U.S. Consulate General in Hamburg

- Location within Hamburg Location within Germany

General information
- Type: Diplomatic mission
- Location: Kehrwieder 8; 20257 Hamburg; Germany
- Coordinates: 53.54379°N 9.98646°E
- Inaugurated: July 2022
- Owner: U.S. Government

The Consulate General of the United States of America in Hamburg is a diplomatic mission representing the United States of America to the city of Hamburg and the State of Schleswig Holstein in the Federal Republic of Germany. The Government of Hamburg counts the promotion of the then Vice-Consul John Parish to the rank of a consul in 1793 as the establishment of the first mission. The consulate-general represents the interests of the United States government in the German states of Hamburg, Bremen, Lower Saxony, Mecklenburg-Vorpommern, and Schleswig-Holstein.

== History ==
I do hereby pray and request the Governors, Burgomasters and Senate of the Imperial free City Hamburgh, to permit the said John Parish fully and peaceably to enjoy and exercise the said Office (Vice Consul), without giving or suffering to be given unto him any Molestation or Trouble, but on the contrary to afford him all the proper Countenance and Assistance; I offering to do the same for all those who in like manner be recommended to me by the said Governors, Burgomasters and Senate of the Imperial free City Hamburgh.

— George Washington, on 17 June 1790

The first American mission to Hamburg was established in 1790 and John Parish was named Vice Consul. In 1793 Parish was promoted to the rank of a consul. In 1897, Hugh Pitcairn was appointed to the consulate, and in 1903 appointed to be Consul General by President Roosevelt.

During the participation of the US in the First and Second World War all consulates in the German Empire were closed. On 1 March 1946 the U.S. government reopened the consulate in Hamburg, and in 1950 purchased the building at Alsterufer on the shore of Lake Außenalster. The building had been the headquarters for the Nazi Party in Hamburg from 1934 until the end of World War II.

In 2024, the U.S. government sold the building to Deutsche Realbesitz Unternehmensgruppe (DERAG), which intends to turn the building into a hotel. The new location of the Consulate General is at Kehrweider 8, 20257 Hamburg, in Amundsen Haus of the Hanseatic Trade Center building complex.

In 2007, Ms. Karen E. Johnson succeeded Duane C. Butcher as consul general in Hamburg. As of 2009, 31 consuls and 22 consuls general had served in Hamburg. The Consul General from 2019 to 2022 was Darion Akins, who began serving in July 2019. Jason Chue assumed duty as Consul General in July 2022.

== Facilities ==
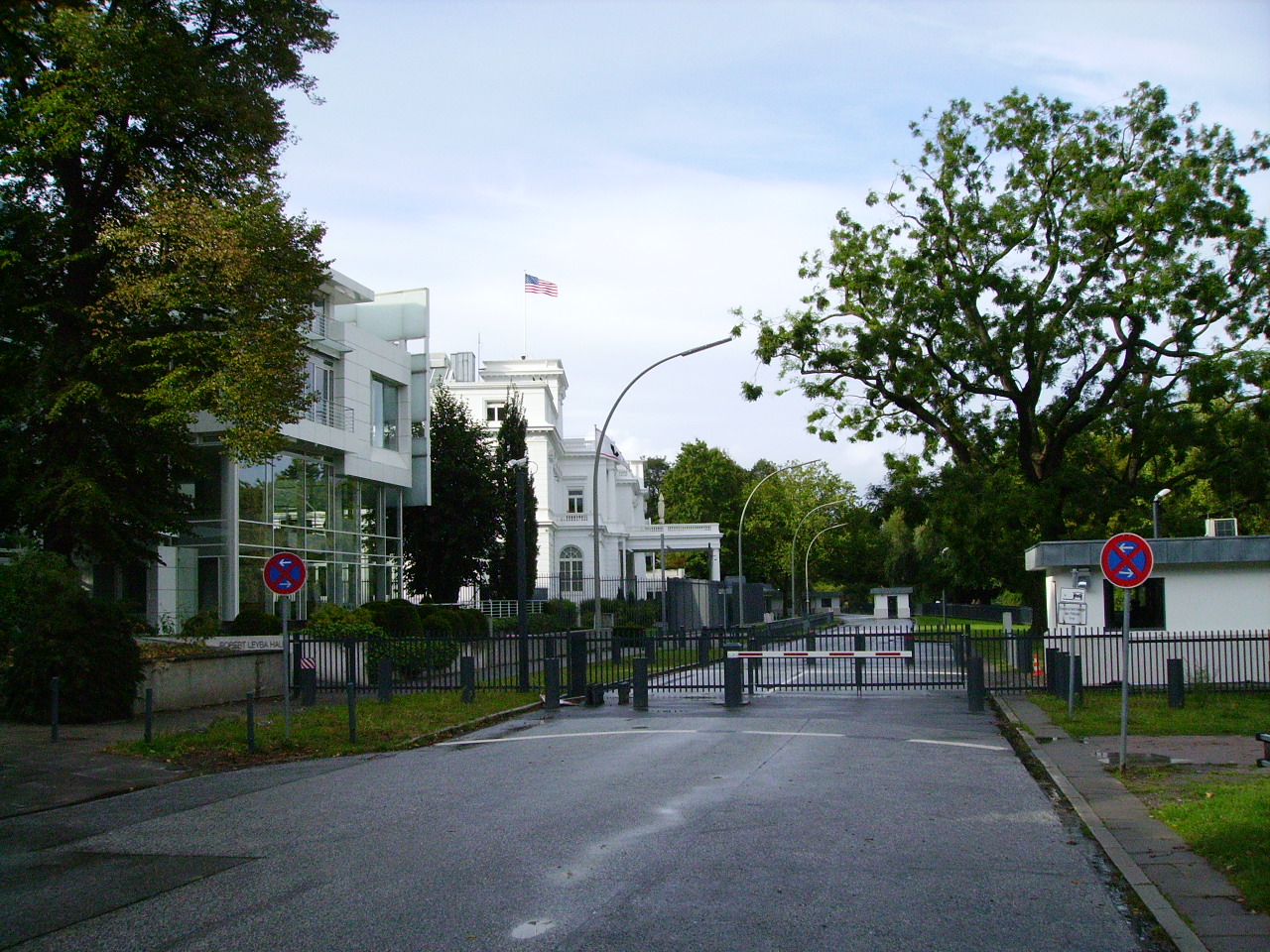
Closed street in front of the consulate-general, view from direction Kennedybrücke.

=== Former Consulate General Building ===
In 1882, the larger one of the two houses was built, and in 1893 the smaller building was finished by architect Martin Haller, who also designed the Hamburg Rathaus. From 1933 until 1945 the Nazi Party used the houses as Hamburg headquarters. After the war, the British forces confiscated the houses, and in 1950 the U.S. government bought them from the heirs of the original owners. Eventually a structure was built between the two houses to create one single building.

After a renovation the consulate moved into the house in 1951. The Consulate General was commonly called das Weiße Haus an der Alster (the White House on the Alster) in Hamburg. Since threats against American embassies, 9/11, and a direct threat against the consulate in Hamburg, the security of the U.S. Consulate General in Hamburg was often strengthened. On 1 April 2009, the Hamburger Morgenpost included the consulate in a satirical April Fools' Day news report, claiming that because of security reasons the consulate would move to a WW II shelter at Heiligengeistfeld. In the late 1990s portions of what used to be a larger property belonging to and surrounding the Consulate were sold off to raise needed cash for the U.S. Embassy in Berlin. The Consulate was known for placing a large Christmas tree every year on the balcony over the entrance.

The artificial lake Außenalster is in front of the former American consulate in the Rotherbaum quarter. The railway station Dammtor is nearby to the South.

In 2024, the U.S. government sold the building to Deutsche Realbesitz Unternehmensgruppe (DERAG), which intends to turn the building into a hotel.

=== Current Consulate General Facilities ===
In July 2022, the U.S. Consulate General moved its operations to leased office space in the Amundsen Hall building of the Hanseatic Trade Center, at Kehrwieder 8.
