= Unrepentant Geraldines Tour =

2014 concert tour by Tori Amos

- Tour by Tori Amos
- Associated album: Unrepentant Geraldines
- Start date: May 5, 2014
- End date: November 21, 2014
- Legs: 4
- No. of shows: 33 in Europe; 4 in Africa; 29 in North America; 7 in Australia; 73 in total

Tori Amos concert chronology
- Gold Dust Orchestral Tour (2012); Unrepentant Geraldines Tour (2014); Native Invader Tour (2017)

The Unrepentant Geraldines Tour was a concert tour by American singer-songwriter, Tori Amos, to support her fourteenth studio album, Unrepentant Geraldines. The tour featured Amos in solo concert playing in Europe, South Africa, North America and Australia.

== Tour dates ==
Date	City	Country	Venue
Europe
May 5, 2014	Cork	Ireland	Cork Opera House
May 7, 2014	Dublin	Ireland	Olympia Theatre
May 8, 2014	Dublin	Ireland	Olympia Theatre
May 10, 2014	Glasgow	United Kingdom	O2 Academy Glasgow
May 11, 2014	Manchester	United Kingdom	Manchester Apollo
May 12, 2014	Birmingham	United Kingdom	Symphony Hall
May 14, 2014	Nottingham	United Kingdom	Nottingham Royal Concert Hall
May 15, 2014	London	United Kingdom	Royal Albert Hall
May 17, 2014	Paris	France	Le Grand Rex
May 19, 2014	Frankfurt	Germany	Jahrhunderthalle
May 20, 2014	Berlin	Germany	Tempodrom
May 22, 2014	Oslo	Norway	Sentrum Scene
May 24, 2014	Copenhagen	Denmark	Koncerthuset
May 25, 2014	Hamburg	Germany	Laeiszhalle
May 26, 2014	Rotterdam	Netherlands	De Doelen
May 28, 2014	Brussels	Belgium	Cirque Royal
May 29, 2014	Amsterdam	Netherlands	Concertgebouw
May 31, 2014	Zürich	Switzerland	Volkshaus
June 2, 2014	Rome	Italy	Parco della Musica
June 3, 2014	Milan	Italy	Teatro Nazionale
June 4, 2014	Padua	Italy	Geox
June 6, 2014	Vienna	Austria	Konzerthaus
June 7, 2014	Linz	Austria	Brucknerhaus
June 9, 2014	Stuttgart	Germany	Hegel Saal
June 10, 2014	Munich	Germany	Gasteig
June 11, 2014	Prague	Czech Republic	Congress Center
June 12, 2014	Warsaw	Poland	Congress Hall
June 14, 2014	Saint Petersburg	Russia	Music Hall
June 15, 2014	Moscow	Russia	Crocus City Hall
June 17, 2014	Kyiv	Ukraine	Oktiabrskiy
June 19, 2014	Bucharest	Romania	Arenele Romane
June 20, 2014	Sofia	Bulgaria	National Palace of Culture
June 22, 2014	Istanbul	Turkey	Küçükçiftlik Park
Africa
June 26, 2014	Johannesburg	South Africa	Montecasino
June 27, 2014	Johannesburg	South Africa	Montecasino
June 29, 2014	Cape Town	South Africa	Cape Town ICC
June 30, 2014	Cape Town	South Africa	Cape Town ICC
North America
July 16, 2014	Vancouver	Canada	Orpheum
July 17, 2014	Seattle	United States	Paramount Theatre
July 18, 2014	Portland	United States	Oregon Zoo Amphitheatre
July 19, 2014	Jacksonville	United States	Britt Festival
July 21, 2014	Oakland	United States	Paramount Theatre
July 23, 2014	Los Angeles	United States	Greek Theatre
July 24, 2014	San Diego	United States	Humphrey's
July 25, 2014	Mesa	United States	Mesa Arts Center
July 27, 2014	Denver	United States	Paramount Theatre
July 29, 2014	Dallas	United States	Margot and Bill Winspear Opera House
July 30, 2014	Austin	United States	Long Center for the Performing Arts
August 1, 2014	St. Louis	United States	Peabody Opera House
August 2, 2014	Kansas City	United States	Midland Theatre
August 3, 2014	Saint Paul	United States	O'Shaughnessy Auditorium
August 5, 2014	Chicago	United States	Chicago Theatre
August 6, 2014	Detroit	United States	Fox Theatre
August 7, 2014	Cleveland	United States	Cain Park
August 8, 2014	Toronto	Canada	Massey Hall
August 10, 2014	Philadelphia	United States	Verizon Hall
August 12, 2014	New York City	United States	Beacon Theatre
August 13, 2014	New York City	United States	Beacon Theatre
August 15, 2014	Boston	United States	Boston Opera House
August 16, 2014	Washington, D.C.	United States	DAR Constitution Hall
August 18, 2014	Nashville	United States	Ryman Auditorium
August 19, 2014	Atlanta	United States	Cobb Energy Performing Arts Centre
August 20, 2014	Durham	United States	Durham Performing Arts Center
August 22, 2014	Clearwater	United States	Ruth Eckerd Hall
August 23, 2014	Orlando	United States	Bob Carr Theater
August 24, 2014	Miami Beach	United States	Jackie Gleason Theater
Australia
November 11, 2014	Sydney	Australia	Sydney Opera House (orchestral concerts with the Sydney Symphony Orchestra)
November 12, 2014	Sydney	Australia	Sydney Opera House (orchestral concerts with the Sydney Symphony Orchestra)
November 15, 2014	Melbourne	Australia	Palais Theatre
November 16, 2014	Adelaide	Australia	Her Majesty's Theatre
November 18, 2014	Perth	Australia	Riverside Theatre
November 20, 2014	Sydney	Australia	City Recital Hall
November 21, 2014	Brisbane	Australia	QPAC Concert Hall
