= Guest House of the Senate of Hamburg =

Villa in Hamburg

Coordinates: 53.5715°N 10.0099°E

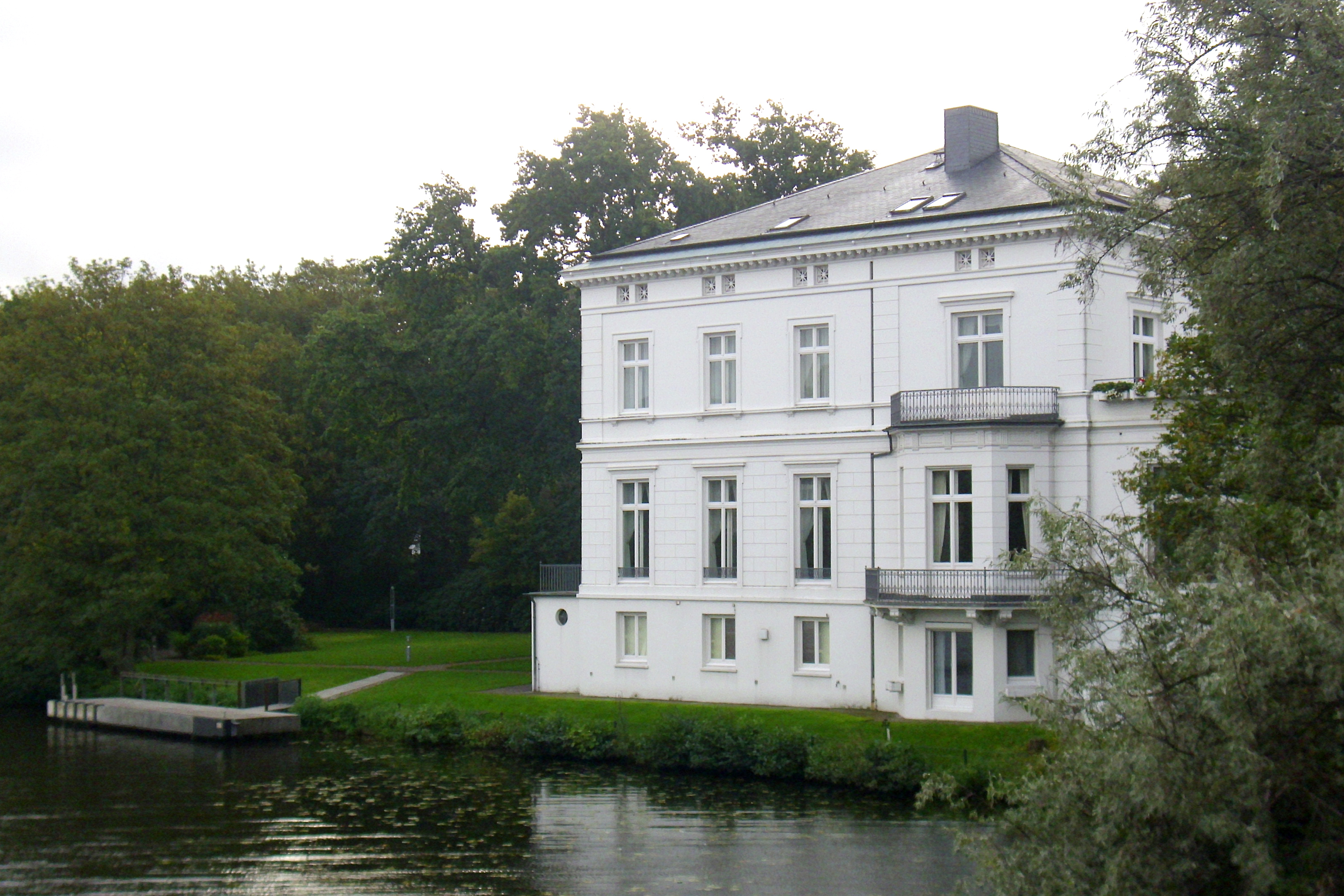
Guest House of the Senate

The Guest House of the Senate of Hamburg (German: Gästehaus des Hamburger Senats) is a villa on the Außenalster in the Hamburg borough of Uhlenhorst. It was built in 1868 as a residence for building materials trader Johann Friedrich Krogmann. Designed by Martin Haller, the villa has two and a half floors and white plaster facades. After Krogmann's death it was sold to merchant Adolf Oetling in 1880.

The building was designated a Kulturdenkmal (cultural heritage site) by the city of Hamburg in 1958. In 1965 it became the guest house for "high-ranking and highest-ranking" guests of Hamburg, first accommodating Elizabeth II and her husband. Other notable guests include Leonid Brezhnev, the Dalai Lama, Jassir Arafat, Henry Kissinger and Donald Trump.

The building was renovated in 1986 for 2.5 million mark. The internal decor was influenced by Christa von Dohnanyi, the wife of then-mayor Klaus von Dohnanyi, and features bright colors, mostly white, with rich stucco ornaments.
