= Cloud Riders =

Single by Tori Amos

from the album Native Invader
- Released: July 27, 2017
- Studio: Martian Engineering (Cornwall)
- Genre: Alternative rock
- Length: 5:23
- Label: Decca
- Songwriter: Tori Amos
- Producer: Tori Amos

Tori Amos singles chronology
"Trouble's Lament" (2014)	"Cloud Riders" (2017)	"Speaking with Trees" (2021)

"Cloud Riders" is a song by American singer-songwriter and pianist Tori Amos. It was released on July 27, 2017, as the lead single from her fifteenth studio album Native Invader. Like the rest of the album, the song was self-produced and recorded at Martian Engineering in Cornwall, England, with mixing being done by Amos' husband Mark Hawley and Marcel van Limbeek.

== Overview ==
Amos stated the inspiration for the song came from the experience of watching a shooting star at 4:22 A.M. That morning, she completed the lyrics for the vast majority of the song, which she has stated took inspiration from Nordic mythology and imagery.

"Cloud Riders" was positively received by critics. NPR stated the song "smolders and shimmers" and "never stops moving and slowly changing shape". Albumism called the song "fantastic" and "melodious".

== Personnel ==
Adapted from the liner notes of Native Invader:

- Tori Amos – vocals, keyboards, Hammond organ, programming, additional instrumentation
- Mac Aladdin – guitar
- Mark Hawley – programming, additional instrumentation
