= Unrepentant Geraldines =

Studio album by Tori Amos
- Released: May 9, 2014
- Recorded: July 2012 – May 2013
- Studios: Martian Engineering Studios, Cornwall, UK
- Genres: Alternative rock; pop rock
- Length: 59:28 (original edition); 70:40 (anniversary edition)
- Label: Mercury Classics
- Producer: Tori Amos

Tori Amos chronology
| Gold Dust (2012) | Unrepentant Geraldines (2014) | Native Invader (2017) |

Singles from Unrepentant Geraldines
- 1. "Trouble's Lament" Released: March 28, 2014

Unrepentant Geraldines is the fourteenth studio album by American singer-songwriter and pianist Tori Amos. It was released on May 9, 2014 through Mercury Classics. The album marks a return to pop and rock music after several releases in the classical genre. Recorded at her own Martian Engineering Studios, the album was self-produced and mixed by her husband Mark Hawley and Marcel van Limbeek.

The album features a stripped-back, acoustic sound with many of the songs' arrangements consisting solely of Amos's vocals and piano. Lyrically, many songs were influenced by visual art; both paintings and photography served as inspiration for the album's material.

Unrepentant Geraldines was critically and commercially successful. The album reached number 7 in the US, becoming Amos's eighth top 10 album in her home country, and charted within the top twenty in eight other countries. Reviews were generally positive, with many finding the album to be one of Amos's strongest releases in years. The album's stripped-back arrangements and vocal performances attracted particular praise. The album was supported by the Unrepentant Geraldines Tour, which ran from May through November 2014 and featured Amos performing solo.

== Background ==
While touring for her last mainstream release in 2009, Amos felt as if she had hit a block in her creative ability and needed to find a new way to make music. This led to her pursuing projects outside the pop/rock genre, including classical music and The Light Princess musical, as well as orchestral re-recordings of songs from her catalogue. Feeling invigorated and with a fresh approach, Unrepentant Geraldines marks Amos's return to pop and alternative rock music. It is described as returning to "her core identity as a creator of contemporary songs of exquisite beauty" with an album of "inspiring and personal music" that, "once more zeroes in on the writing of brightly melodic, deftly evocative chamber-pop." According to Amos, the songs on the album were a long time in the making, exploring different styles and subject matter. Amos stated that she'd written the songs "in secret", enjoying the freedom of not working in a large group of musicians. She described the album as different snapshots of her life and things she'd observed.

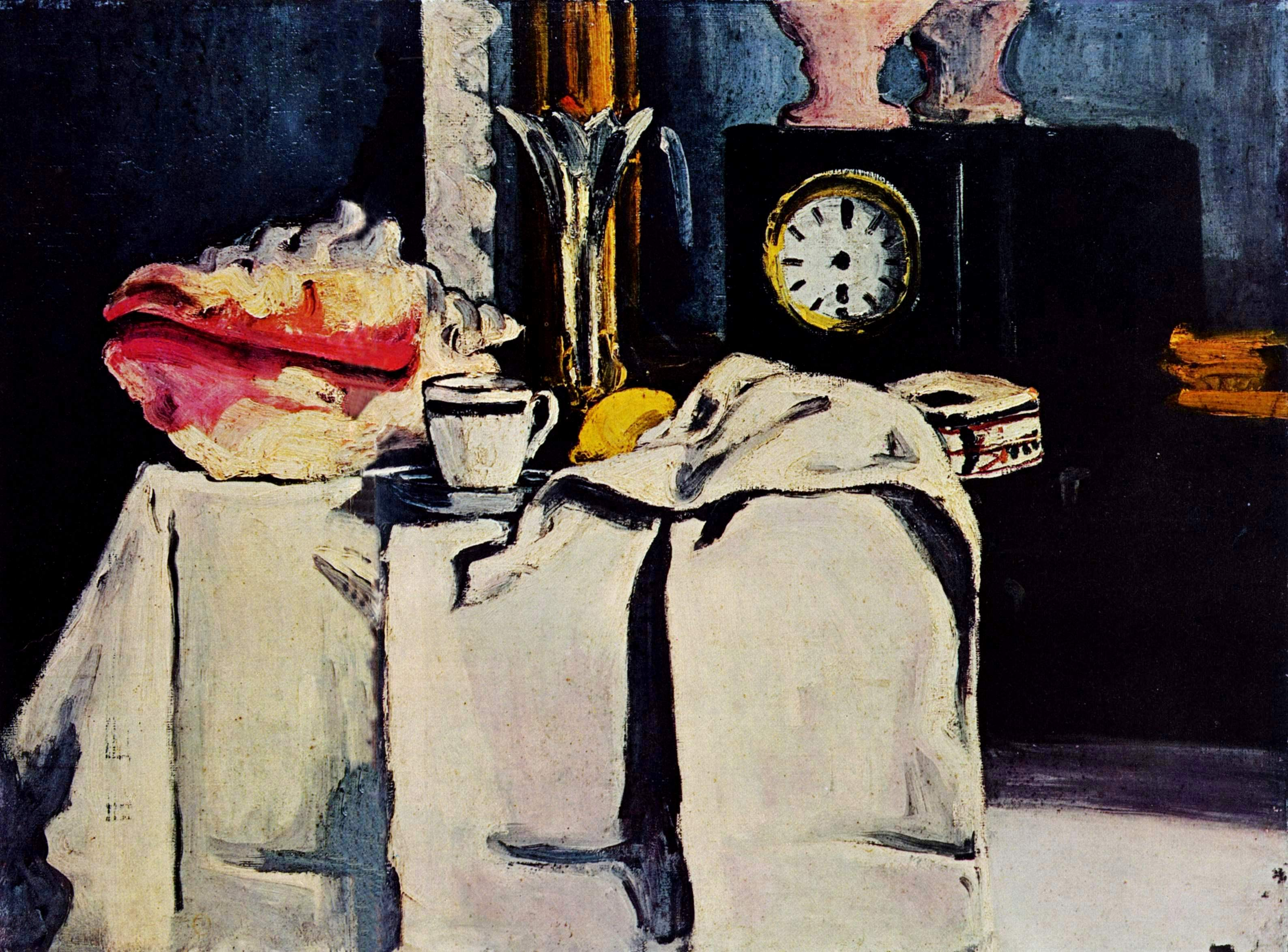
The Impressionist painter Cézanne was an inspiration for Amos, with The Black Marble Clock (c. 1870) specifically mentioned.

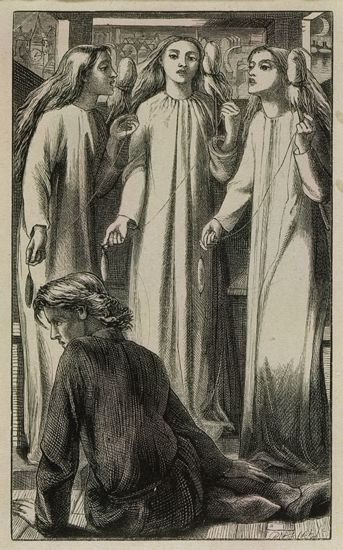
Rosetti's woodcut illustration The Maids of Elfen-Mere (1855) was originally made for a poem by William Allingham.

Unrepentant Geraldines is described as "an appreciative portrayal of the singer's experiences with visual art". Amos stated:

I've always been inspired by visual artists of all mediums because, as with music, art is not a job you can go to and leave from, but it is something that defines who and what you are [...] Visual artists shake up our brains and force us to look at everything, from objects we don't normally think twice about to people we might not have cared about. In one image, they can remind us of nature's power to enchant, as well as humankind's fruitless attempt to overpower her or simply second-guess her. Through the visual artist's application of tone, shape, pattern and pigment, I not only begin to see, but I can honestly say I begin to hear.

The album's title reflects the unapologetic women that refuse to apologize for their actions and beliefs. A wide range of topics are explored on the album, including the "other" America, ageing in "16 Shades of Blue", the thrill of danger in "Trouble's Lament", not letting go of childhood imagination in "Rose Dover", the 2013 NSA surveillance scandals in "Giant's Rolling Pin", and making peace with haunting memories and self-doubt in "Oysters". Amos' daughter appears as a duet partner in "Promise", about mother and daughter being there for each other. Having a teenage girl's perspective to consult was reportedly a large influence on the record, exposing Amos to a different outlook than her own.

The album was recorded and mixed at Martian Engineering at Amos's home in Cornwall, with Amos and long-time engineers Mark Hawley (Amos's husband) and Marcel van Limbeek "working as a triangle". Amos stated that she had needed to experiment and that the small team was liberating for this purpose. On the contents of the album, she said it was "not going for shock, shock is easy", instead striving to create songs that "resonate with the now."

== Promotion and release ==
Promotional material for the album was first shown in February when behind-the-scenes stills from the album's photo shoot were released on social media. The official cover art was revealed piece by piece in a 5-day online countdown, with an announcement the following day confirming the album's US release date and unveiling North American tour dates. The artwork and promos for the album feature images shot by fashion photographer Amarpaul Kalirai.

The album was supported by the Unrepentant Geraldines Tour, which started May 5, 2014, with over 80 stops across Europe, North America and South Africa. The tour featured Amos solo, her first world tour without a backing band in almost 10 years.

The album's track list featuring the lead single "Trouble's Lament" and its cover art was announced by Amos on social media March 27. The track was available to listen the day after. Digital pre-sale of the album on iTunes became available in the US from April 15 and includes the exclusive bonus track "White Telephone to God", while giving instant access to the album track "Selkie".

Short videos on the album's making with commentary by Amos was released throughout April, featuring previews of two new tracks: "Wedding Day" and "America". Commentary was released gradually, revealing inspirations, the creative process, and how Amos saw the album as a product of everything in her career so far. On April 8, Amos played an event for press and contest winners in Berlin, Germany. The performance included the new songs "Trouble's Lament" and "Selkie". In a radio interview the following day, the album track "Promise" was premiered.

Leading up to the album release date, Amos participated in numerous radio, print and television interviews. SPIN hosted an in-store live performance by Amos in New York City on April 29. The event was streamed live. Amos was a guest on Katie Couric's talk show on April 30, performing Trouble's Lament live on television. On May 18, Amos is a guest alongside pop artist Paloma Faith on the BBC Radio 2 programme Weekend Wogan.

Amos was featured on the May 6 cover of Next Magazine, a New York gay lifestyle publication. In the interview, she talked about Unrepentant Geraldines and what her gay fans mean to her.

Previews of all the songs became available on music websites starting April 26. NPR premiered "16 Shades of Blue" on May 6. The entire album including the Amazon-exclusive track "Dixie" was available to stream from May 7.

== Critical reception ==
Professional ratings
Aggregate scores
| Source | Rating |
|---|---|
| Metacritic | 77/100 |
Review scores
| Source | Rating |
| AllMusic | 3/5 stars |
| Attitude | 4/5 stars |
| The A.V. Club | A− |
| Renowned for Sound | 5/5 stars |
| Hot Press | 3.5/5 stars |
| PopMatters | 9/10 |
| Spiegel | 8.6/10 |
| The Guardian | 3/5 stars |
| Uncut | 7/10 |
| Trebutchet Magazine | Highly positive |

Unrepentant Geraldines was met with critical acclaim. Most reviewers agreed that it saw Amos returning to great form and the successful format of her songwriting and production in the 1990s. The simpler, piano-led tracks "Oysters", "Invisible Boy" and "Selkie" drew universal praise, as did Amos' strong vocal delivery throughout the record. Some of the album's experimentally produced tracks, like "16 Shades of Blue" and "Giant's Rolling Pin", divided critics. Overall, the album was found to be a graceful and mature back-to-basics success for Amos:

NPR's Bob Boilen and Robin Hilton called it Amos' best in 20 years. Metro Weekly called it a beautiful and triumphant addition to Amos's artistic legacy. Trebutchet Magazine was full of praise, stating: "it's a very, very good album with lots of variety and the sort of painstaking precision and polish that is frankly terrifying when viewed in its full context." Renowned for Sound gave a perfect 5-star rating, calling it a masterpiece, far above commercial hit-based pop music. Hot Press reviewed it positively, giving 3.5/5 stars, finding it a risk-taking effort with dreamy material evoking Amos' classics. Attitude gave 4 stars, singling out "Invisible Boy" as the standout track. Platten Tests gave 7/10, calling the record an hour of wonderful music. So So Gay gave 4 stars, praising the experimentation and highlighting the piano-driven songs. Der Spiegel highly complimented the album with an 8.6/10 review. The New York Times was positive, finding "Wild Way" and "Wedding Day" to be most striking. The Guardian's Dave Simpson gave the album a 3-star review, praising Amos' "pure" and "powerful" vocals and the sparse piano tracks, but finding the experimentation on other songs to yield mixed results. Wondering Sound's favourable review found the record to be the natural, gracefully seasoned sequel that Amos's 2002 album Scarlet's Walk deserved, ignoring the "questionable" output in-between. Ampya gave it a rating of 8/10, complimenting the "step back" and the quality of simply Amos' voice and the piano in evoking "near cinematic emotions". Exclaim! gave it a rating of 8/10, stating that Amos is "her own genre" and the record is personal and fresh. The Norwegian newspaper Dagsavisen gave it a rating of 5/6, writing that the album "is packed with great moments". In the review for AllMusic, editor Stephen Thomas Erlewine described the album as "lush and melodic but also barbed, sometimes seeming dissonant but often consoling, its soothing qualities eventually turning disturbing."

== Track listing ==
All tracks are written by Tori Amos.

Unrepentant Geraldines
| No. | Title | Length |
|---|---|---|
| 1. | "America" | 4:12 |
| 2. | "Trouble's Lament" | 3:44 |
| 3. | "Wild Way" | 2:55 |
| 4. | "Wedding Day" | 3:44 |
| 5. | "Weatherman" | 4:41 |
| 6. | "16 Shades of Blue" | 3:52 |
| 7. | "Maids of Elfen-Mere" | 2:53 |
| 8. | "Promise" | 4:04 |
| 9. | "Giant's Rolling Pin" | 4:11 |
| 10. | "Selkie" | 4:05 |
| 11. | "Unrepentant Geraldines" / "The Vicar's Wife" (unlisted) | 6:57 |
| 12. | "Oysters" | 5:14 |
| 13. | "Rose Dover" | 3:55 |
| 14. | "Invisible Boy" | 4:57 |
| Total length: | | 59:28 |

Additional tracks

As with many of Amos' albums, multiple tracks from the sessions for Unrepentant Geraldines had at the time been released in various forms as bonus tracks. All three have been added to the 10th anniversary edition of the album, released in 2024.

- "Forest of Glass" (5:08) – deluxe edition bonus track
- "White Telephone to God" (2:25) – iTunes bonus track
- "Dixie" (3:46) – Amazon bonus track

Other bonus content: The deluxe edition DVD includes an album trailer, interview, studio tour, and album photo shoot

== Personnel ==
- Tori Amos – vocals, Bösendorfer piano, Hammond organ, Wurlitzer electric piano, Mellotron, Fender Rhodes, producer
- Mac Aladdin – guitars
- Mark Hawley – additional instrumentation, producer, mixer, programmer
- Natashya Hawley – vocals on "Promise"
- Karen Binns – style and concept
- Marcel van Limbeek – producer, mixer
- Amarpaul Kalirai – photography
- Desmond Murray – hair
- Nora Nona – make-up
- Matt Read – package design
- Adam Spry – chief technician
- Ann Walker – piano technician

== Charts ==
Chart performance for Unrepentant Geraldines
| Chart (2014) | Peak position |
|---|---|
| Australian Albums (ARIA) | 58 |
| Austrian Albums (Ö3 Austria) | 17 |
| Belgian Albums (Ultratop Flanders) | 23 |
| Belgian Albums (Ultratop Wallonia) | 22 |
| Canadian Albums (Billboard) | 26 |
| Danish Albums (Hitlisten) | 19 |
| Dutch Albums (Album Top 100) | 10 |
| Finnish Albums (Suomen virallinen lista) | 41 |
| French Albums (SNEP) | 61 |
| German Albums (Offizielle Top 100) | 15 |
| Italian Albums (FIMI) | 22 |
| Polish Albums (ZPAV) | 28 |
| Scottish Albums (Official Charts) | 14 |
| Swiss Albums (Schweizer Hitparade) | 20 |
| UK Albums (Official Charts) | 13 |
| US Billboard 200 | 7 |

Chart performance for Unrepentant Geraldines (2024 expanded edition)
| Chart (2024) | Peak position |
|---|---|
| Scottish Albums (OCC) | 27 |
| UK Album Sales (OCC) | 22 |

== Release history ==
| Country | Date | Format | Label |
|---|---|---|---|
| Germany | May 9, 2014 | CD; CD+DVD; Digital download; LP | Mercury Classics; Universal Mercury Classics |
| United Kingdom | May 12, 2014 | CD; CD+DVD; Digital download; LP | Mercury Classics; Universal Mercury Classics |
| United States | May 13, 2014 | CD; CD+DVD; Digital download; LP | Mercury Classics; Universal Mercury Classics |
| Australia | May 16, 2014 | CD; CD+DVD; Digital download; LP | Mercury Classics; Universal Mercury Classics |
| United Kingdom | September 13, 2024 | CD; Digital download; LP; Blu-ray audio | Decca |
