= Trouble's Lament =

Single by Tori Amos

from the album Unrepentant Geraldines
- Released: March 28, 2014
- Studio: Martian Engineering (Cornwall)
- Genre: Pop rock; alternative rock; acoustic rock
- Length: 3:40
- Label: Universal/Mercury Classics
- Songwriter: Tori Amos
- Producer: Tori Amos

Tori Amos singles chronology
"Flavor" (2012)	"Trouble's Lament" (2014)	"Cloud Riders" (2017)

"Trouble's Lament" is a song by American singer-songwriter and pianist Tori Amos from her fourteenth studio album, Unrepentant Geraldines (2014). It was released as the album's lead promotional single on March 28, 2014, by Universal/Mercury Classics as a digital download only.

== Recording and release ==
Trouble's Lament was announced by Amos on March 27 to be the first song available from the album. Cover art was released on Amos' social media sites the same day, along with the album's complete track list.

Musically, the song is influenced by different musical styles, including Americana, folk music, Flamenco and pop music. Amos' piano playing is accompanied by acoustic guitar and sparse percussion. The instrumentation is similar to the music of Neko Case, Patty Griffin, Fleetwood Mac and Amos' own past production on the predominantly acoustic Scarlet's Walk (2002).

The song's lyrics finds Amos stating that "Trouble needs a home" after having left Satan behind, and sings about welcoming Danger into her life.

Of the song's style and background, Amos (who is originally from North Carolina) stated that her Southern roots were influential: "It's really in the blood. It's almost like you listen to the land speaking to you. And wherever I am I can hear the South calling me. I really like the idea that trouble was a young woman....I see her on my travels a lot. And maybe I knew her many years ago when I was in my twenties."

Musicians:

- Tori Amos, piano and vocals.
- Mac Aladdin, acoustic guitar.

Personnel:

- Music and lyrics by Tori Amos.
- Produced by Tori Amos.
- Mixed and mastered by Mark Hawley and Marcel van Limbeek.

== Music video ==
The accompanying music video was shot on location in London, featuring Amos in a diner in Islington. At points in the video three young women (with the help of a young gay male waiter) come into the diner and provide distractions to steal data and files from two businessmen. Their tactics include spilling coffee on one man and having the waiter flirt with the other. They also interact with Amos' character who watches from a nearby table. The end shot shows Amos handing the three women new passports as they sit in the back of her car.

On April 18, Amos shared behind-the-scenes snapshots of the production, showing some "new friends" and stating that filming was still underway.

The video was released on May 28, 2014 via Amos' Facebook fan page.

== Critical reception ==
Reactions to the song were highly positive. The track was noted as being signature Amos, with most critics complimenting the song's Americana-influence, Amos' vocal performance, the dark lyrics and the rippling piano. Rolling Stone called the song "haunting and eerie," with a showcase vocal range. SPIN found it to be a "perfect return" and an "undeniably good look" for Amos. Consequence of Sound said it was a charming song with "otherworldly" harmonies. Broadway World called the track "an eerie Southern blues song," noting that Amos' voice is "matchless." Noisey likewise took pleasure in the Americana-influence and vocals. PinkIsTheNewBlog stated its love for the track, favourably comparing the musical style to Scarlet's Walk. Music blog Nuwave Pony also expressed love for the song's "groovy, sinister arrangement" and "honey-coated vocals." Indie music site Death and Taxes likened the song to PJ Harvey's work on Let England Shake, finding Amos' track to be more upbeat and accessible. Exclaim! called it a "dust-kicking" and spooky track with luscious vocals. Stereogum stated that the song was "exactly what we want from Tori." Glide Magazine found Amos' vocals to be "fresh, sultry and inviting," in top form and reminiscent of her work in the early 1990s. Flavorwire called the track a typically pretty Amos song, stating: "what's not to love?" Under the Gun Review said the track "is full of spice and any fan of Tori Amos will enjoy it." Faster Louder included the song in their weekly should-hear music roundup, commenting that it was exactly what fans would enjoy. Mxdwn.com called it a soulful blues track, noting Amos' one-of-a-kind vocals and talent for thought-provoking lyrics.
