= Speaking with Trees =

Single by Tori Amos

from the album Ocean to Ocean
- Released: September 29, 2021
- Recorded: 2021
- Studio: Martian Engineering (Cornwall)
- Genre: Alternative rock
- Length: 3:56
- Label: Decca
- Producer: Tori Amos

Tori Amos singles chronology
"Cloud Riders" (2017)	"Speaking with Trees" (2021)	"Cornflake Girl (live)" (2024)

"Speaking with Trees" is a song by American singer-songwriter and pianist Tori Amos, released as the first single from her sixteenth studio album Ocean to Ocean on September 29, 2021.

== Background ==
The main inspiration behind the song was Amos’ mother. Asked about the meaning of the song she stated:

My mother, really, I am hiding her ashes in a treehouse in Florida. That's "Speaking with Trees". Getting out and being able to talk to the trees in Cornwall thinking that they’re the network, the worldwide web that lives under the trees.

Additionally, a press release described the song as being about "the absence of live music during the coronavirus pandemic."

The track features many of Amos’ frequent collaborators, including bassist Jon Evans and drummer Matt Chamberlain, alongside husband Mark Hawley on guitar and her daughter Natashya Hawley contributing backing vocals.

== Critical reception ==
"Speaking with Trees", alongside its parent album, received positive reviews from critics. Medium likened the track to Amos' earlier material, saying it "[partners] painful and sensitive lyrical content with vibrant, offbeat pop hooks."

== Personnel ==
- Tori Amos – vocals, piano, keyboards
- John Philip Shenale – synthesizer
- Tash – backup vocals
- Jon Evans – bass
- Matt Chamberlain – drums, percussion
- Mark Hawley – guitar, dobro
