= Hamburg City Hall =

- Hamburger Rathaus
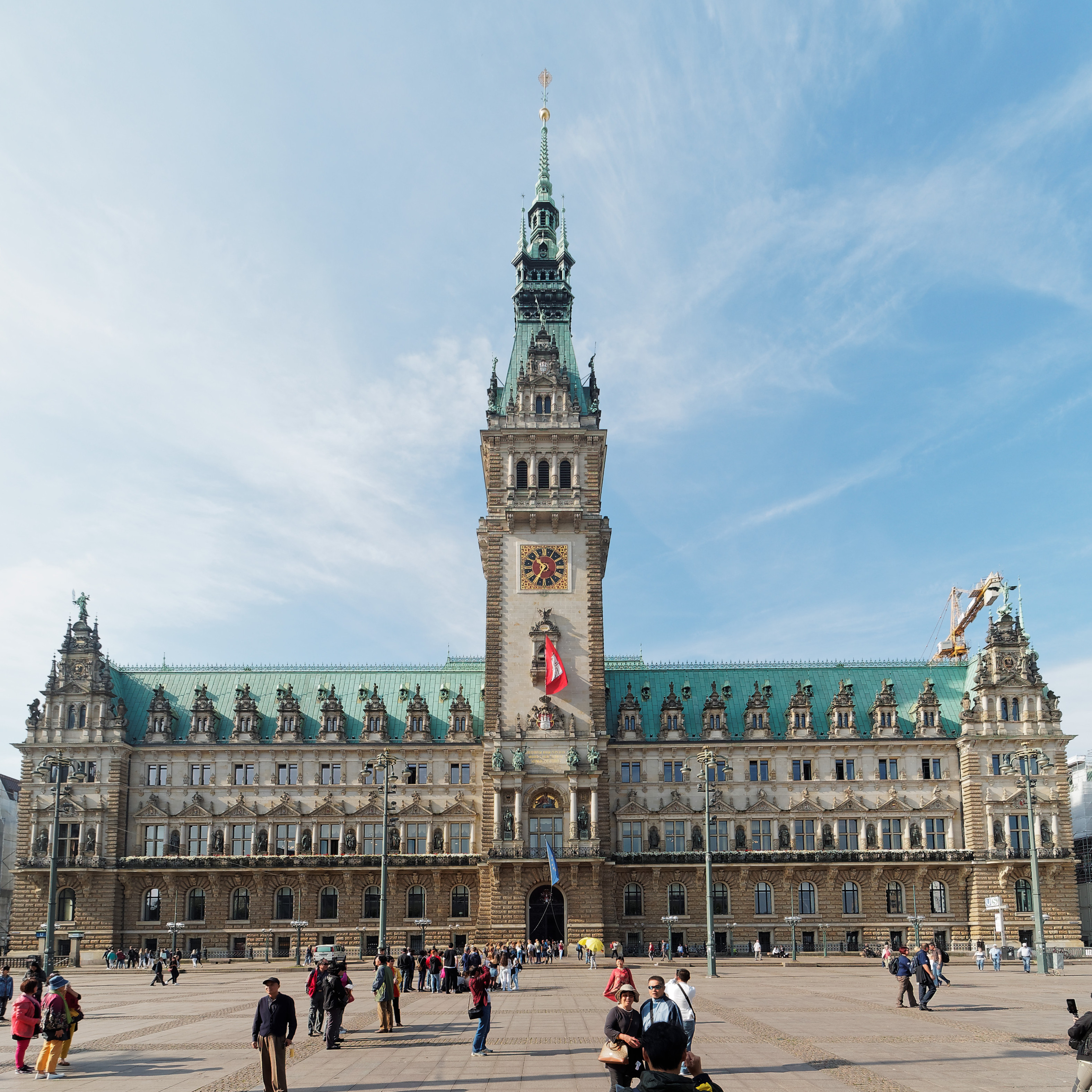
- Rathaus and Rathausmarkt, 2017

General information
- Type: City hall
- Architectural style: Revivalism
- Location: Rathausmarkt 1
- Coordinates: 53°33′01″N 9°59′32″E
- Construction started: 6 May 1886 (laying of the first stone)
- Inaugurated: 26 October 1897
- Cost: 11 million Gold mark
- Client: Government of Hamburg
- Owner: Government of Hamburg

Height
- Height: 112 m (367 ft)

Technical details
- Floor area: 17,000 m^{2} (180,000 ft^{2})

Design and construction
- Architects: Martin Haller (main architect), Johannes Grotjan, Bernhard Hanssen, Wilhelm Hauers, Leopold Lamprecht, Wilhelm Emil Meerwein, Hugo Stammann and Gustav Zinnow

Hamburg City Hall (German: Hamburger Rathaus, pronounced [ˈhambʊʁɡɐ ˈʁaːthaʊs]) is the seat of local government of Hamburg, Germany. It is the seat of the government of Hamburg and as such, the seat of one of Germany's 16 state parliaments. The Rathaus is located in the Altstadt quarter in the city center, at the Rathausmarkt square, and near the lake Binnenalster and the central station. Constructed from 1886 to 1897, the city hall still houses its original governmental functions with the office of the First Mayor of Hamburg and the meeting rooms for the Parliament and the Senate (the city's executive branch).

== History ==
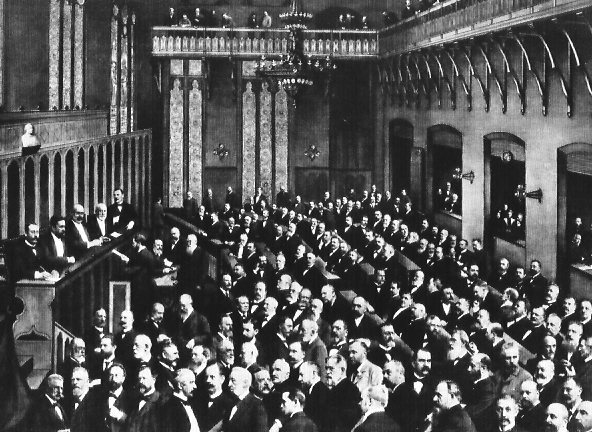
Floor of the parliament in 1897

After the old city hall was destroyed in the great fire of 1842, it took almost 44 years to build a new one. The present building was designed by a group of seven architects, led by Martin Haller. Construction started in 1886 and the new city hall was inaugurated in 1897. Its cost was 11 million German gold marks, about €80 million. On 26 October 1897 at the official opening ceremony the First Mayor Johannes Versmann received the key of the city hall.

The tower was slightly damaged by the allied bombing of Germany during the Second World War and was subsequently repaired.

In the postwar period, various heads of state visited Hamburg and its City Hall — among them Emperor Haile Selassie in 1954, the Shahanshah Mohammad Reza Pahlavi in 1955, and Queen Elizabeth II in 1965. An emotionally moving service of remembrance was held on the market-square for the victims of the North Sea flood of 1962. Happier moments were the celebrations of Hamburger SV as German football champions in 1983.

In 1971 a room in the tower was only discovered accidentally during a search for a document fallen behind a filing cabinet. So there is a probability that there are even more rooms than the currently counted 647 rooms.

== Architecture ==
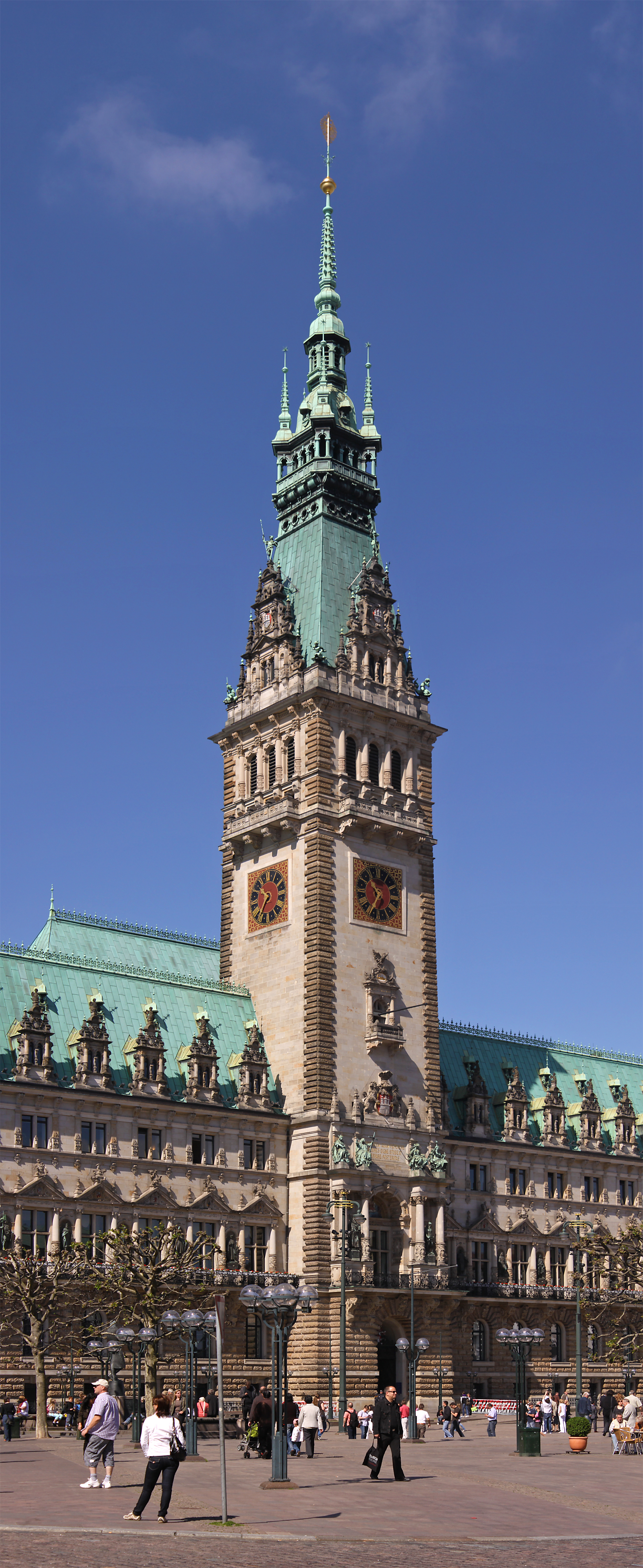
Rathaus tower

On the outside the architectural style is Neo-Renaissance, which is abandoned inside for several historical elements. It is one of the few completely preserved buildings of historicism in Hamburg. The roof is made of copper which, over time, has reacted with carbon dioxide and water and turned green, showing the age of the building. Built in a period of wealth and prosperity, in which the Kingdom of Prussia and its military defeated France in the Franco-German War and the German Empire was formed, the look of the new Hamburg Rathaus was intended to express this wealth and also the independence of the State of Hamburg and Hamburg's republican traditions. The city hall has a total area of 17,000 m^{2} (182,986 sq ft), not including the restaurant Ratsweinkeller, now called Parlament, of 2,900 m^{2} (31,215 sq ft). The tower is 112 metres (367 ft) high with 436 steps. It is a common misconception that Hamburg Rathaus has more rooms than Buckingham Palace (647 vs. 775), on a building area of 5,400 m^{2} (58,125 sq ft).

The balcony is surmounted by a mosaic of Hamburg's patron goddess Hammonia, the city's coat of arms and an inscription of the city's motto in Latin:

"Libertatem quam peperere maiores digne studeat servare posteritas." (in English: The freedom won by our elders, may posterity strive to preserve it in dignity.)

The courtyard is decorated with a Hygieia fountain. Hygieia as the goddess of health and hygiene in Greek mythology and its surrounding figures represent the power and pureness of the water. It was built in remembrance of the cholera epidemic in 1892.

=== Interiors ===
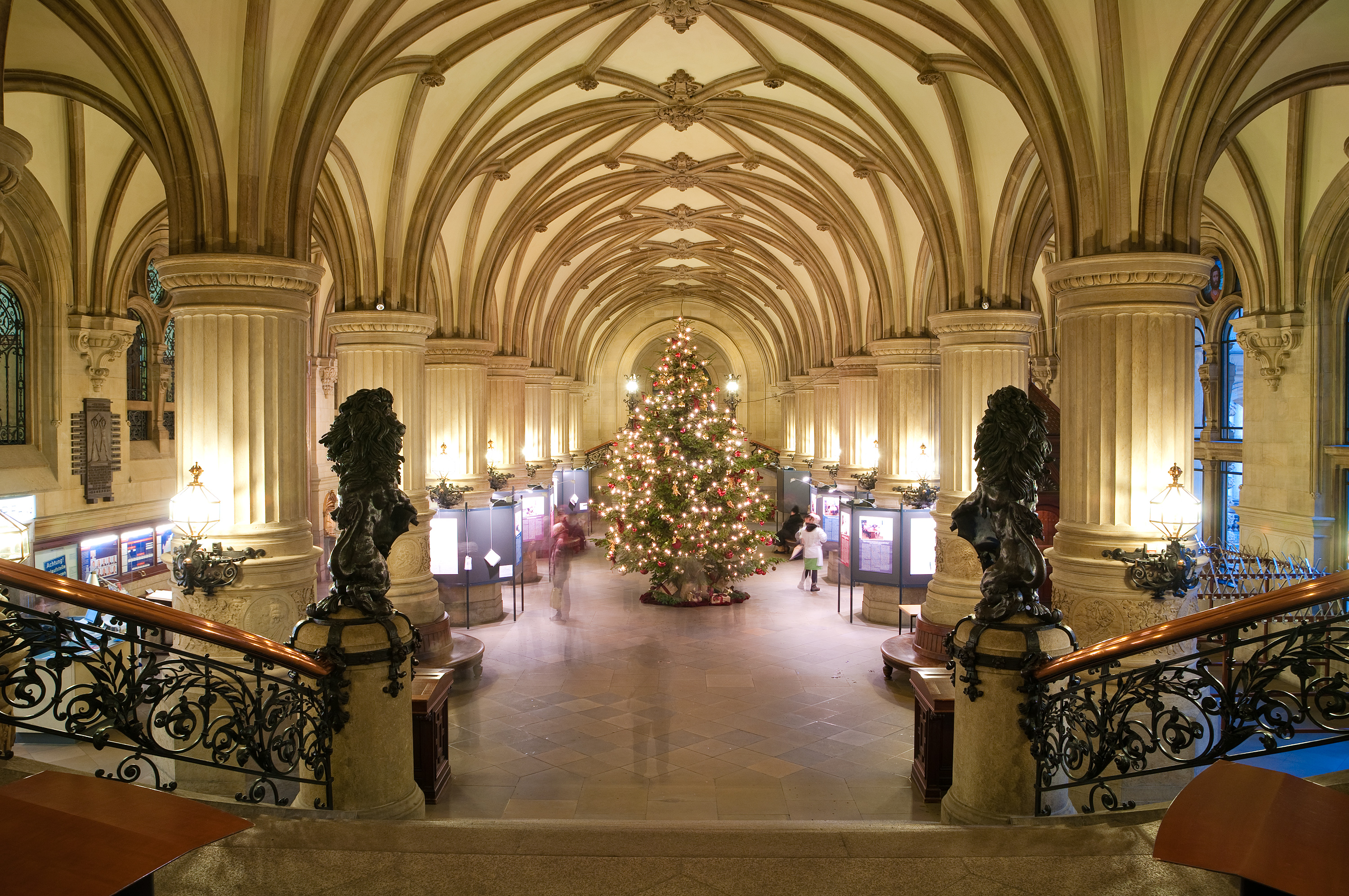
Grand Hallway

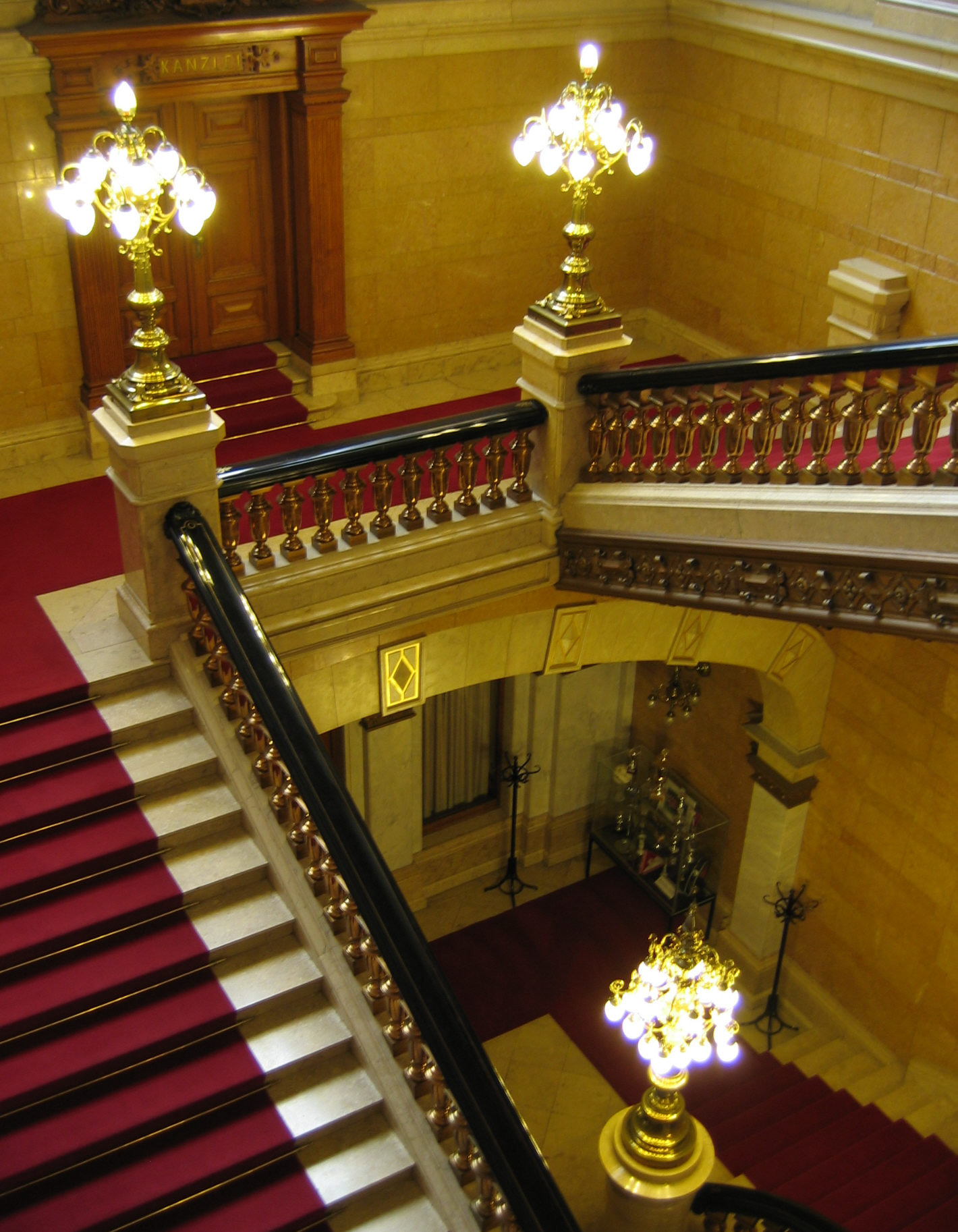
Stairwell to the Bürgerschaft

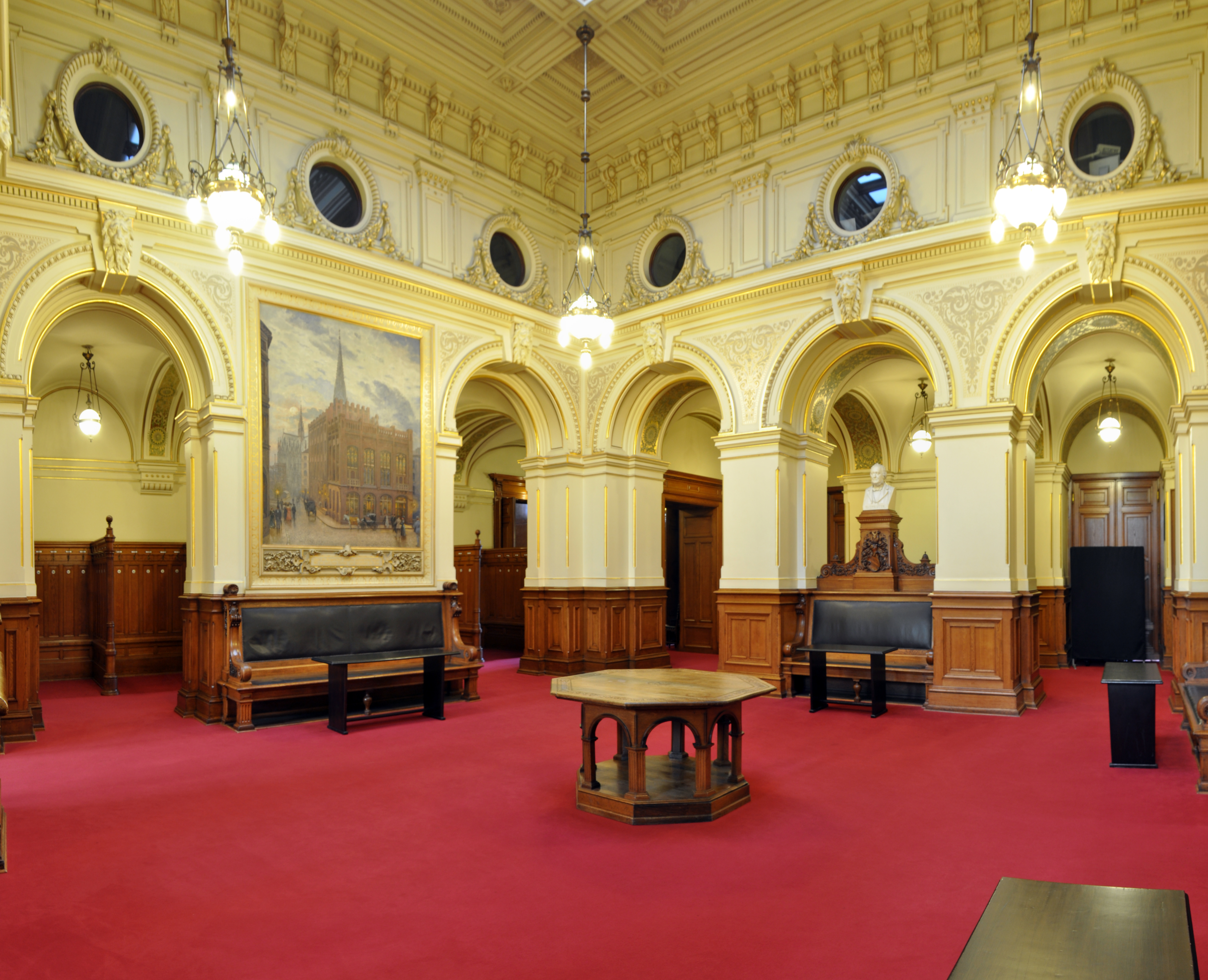
Lobby of the Bürgerschaft

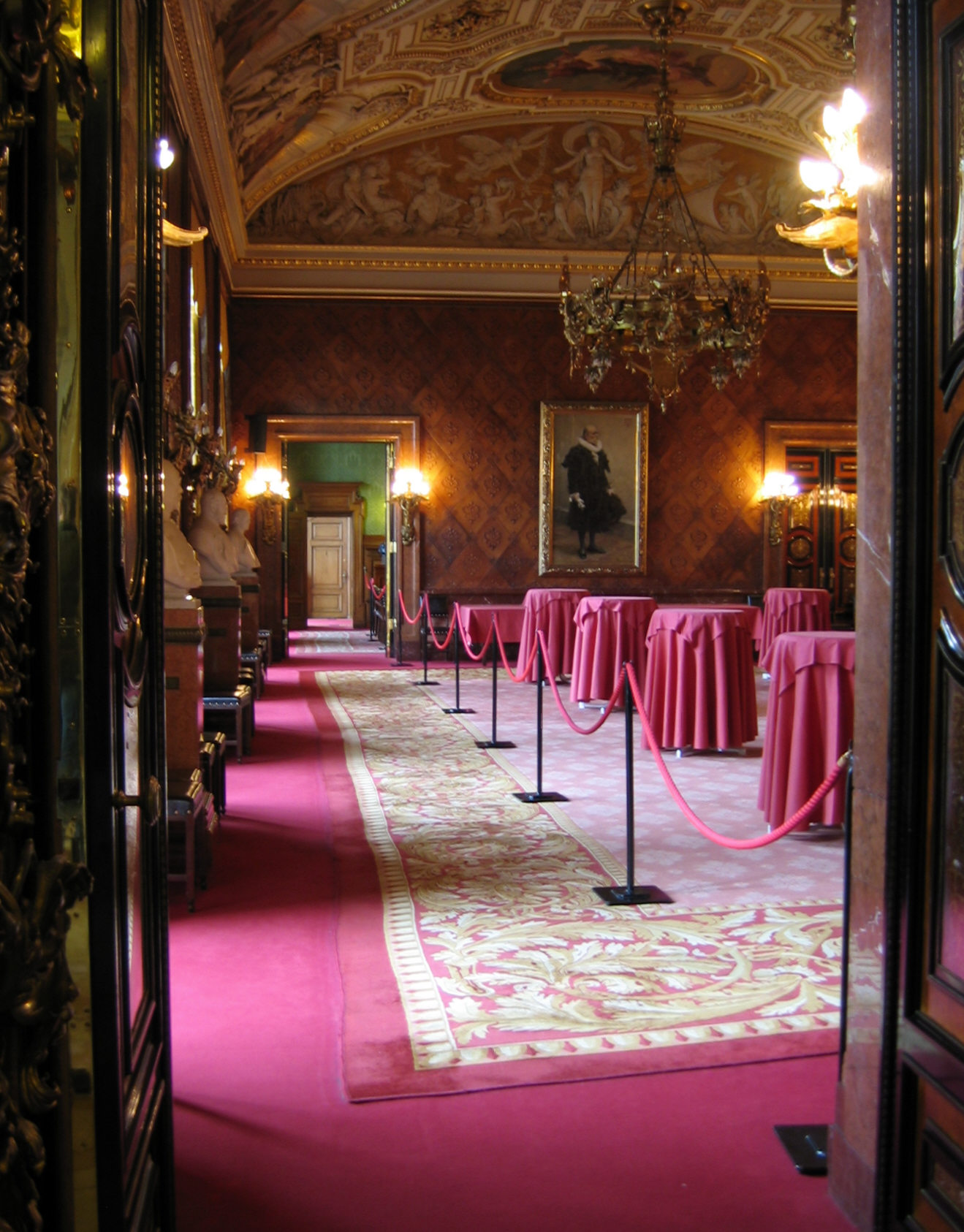
Kaisersaal (Emperor's Hall)

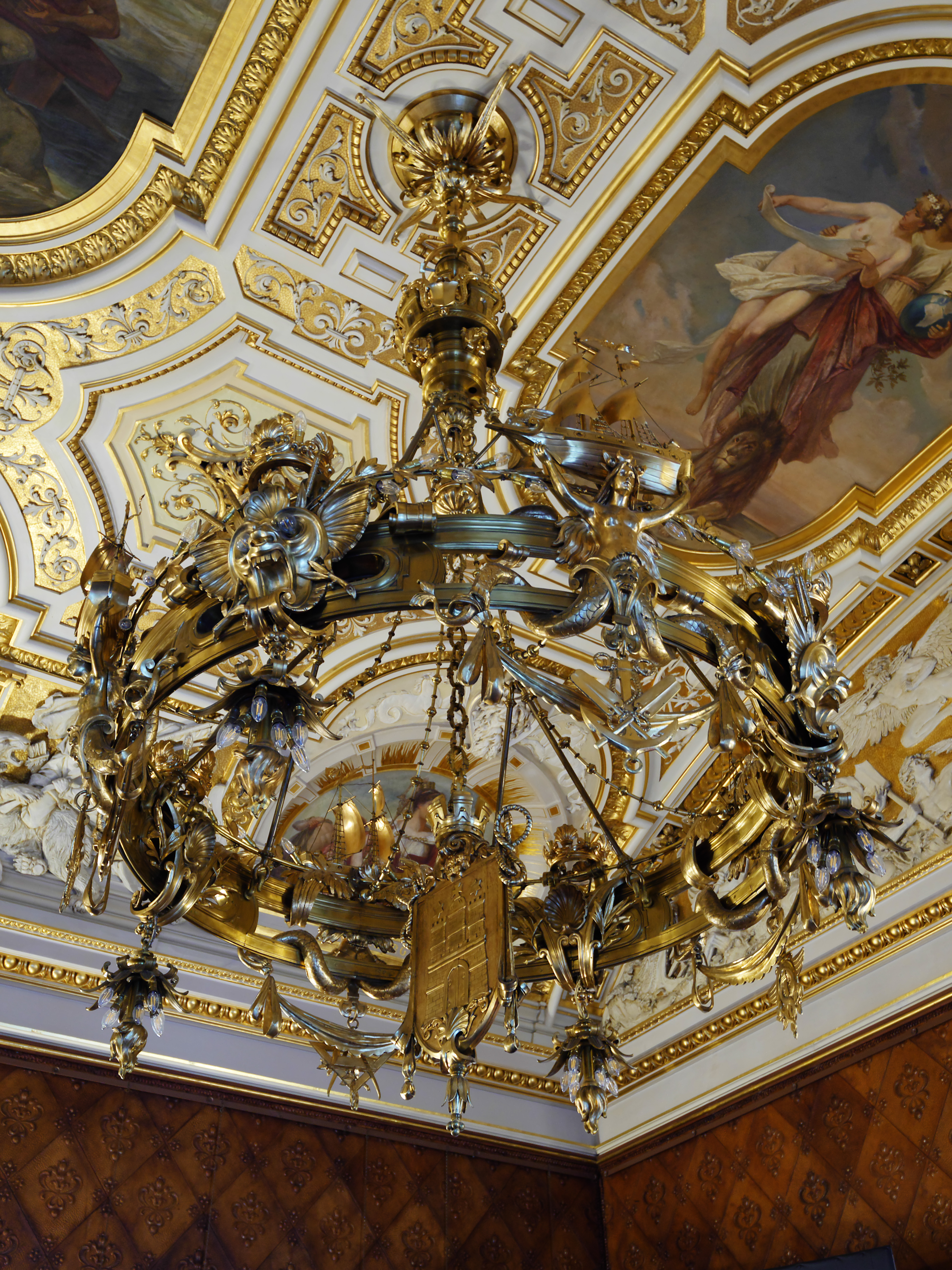
Chandelier, Kaisersaal

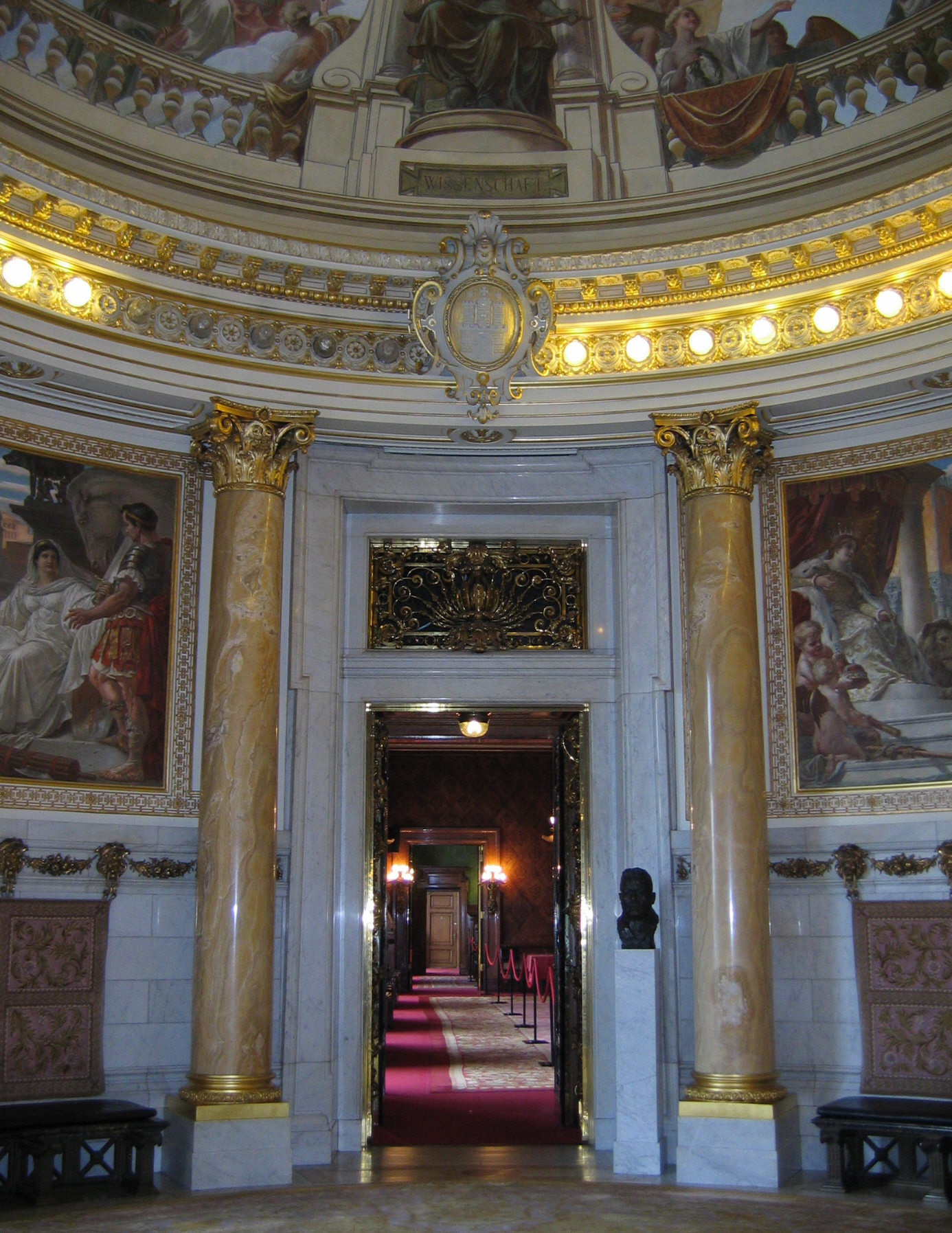
Tower hall

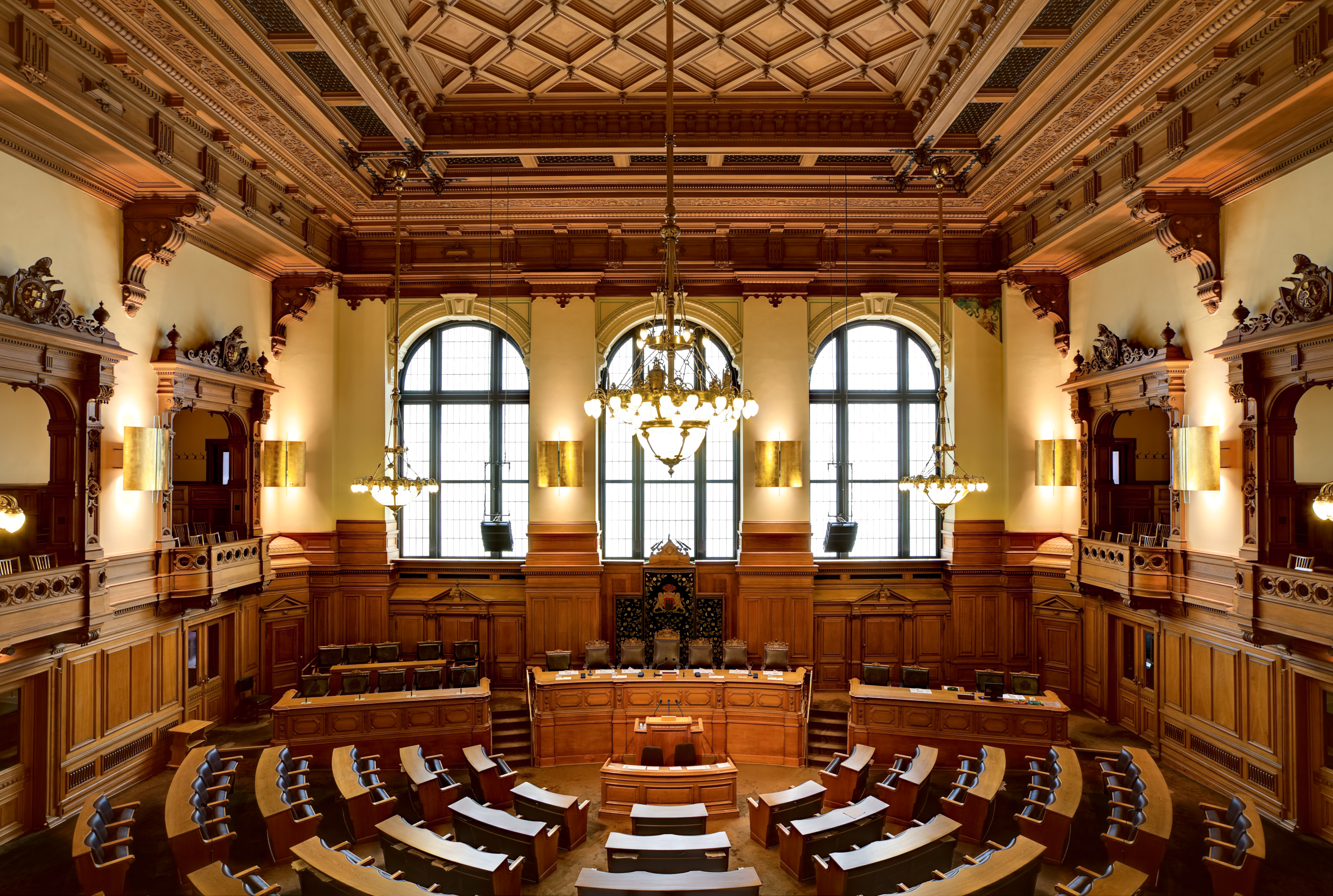
Plenary Hall of the Hamburg Parliament

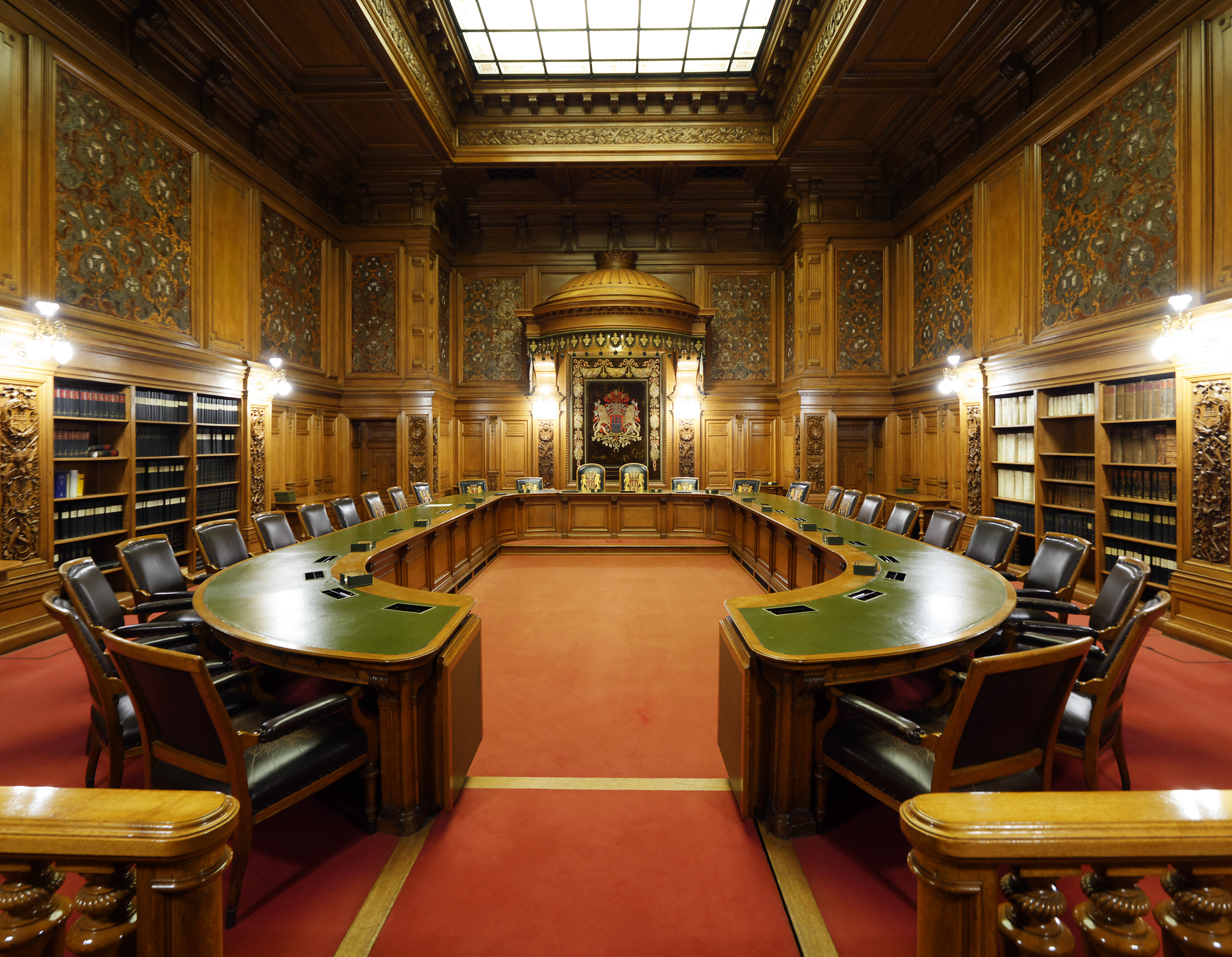
Council chamber, Senate meeting room

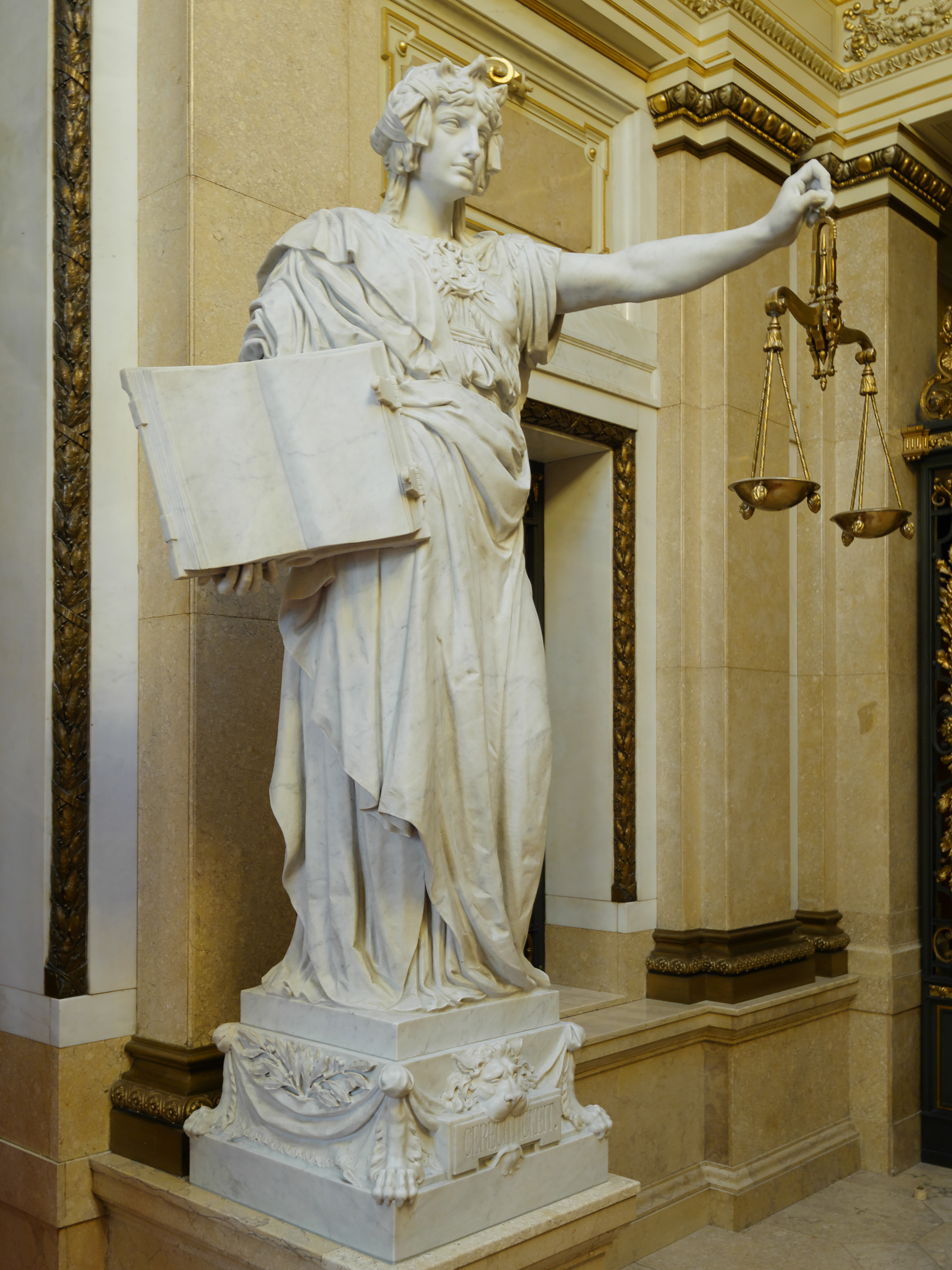
"Justice", Senate wing

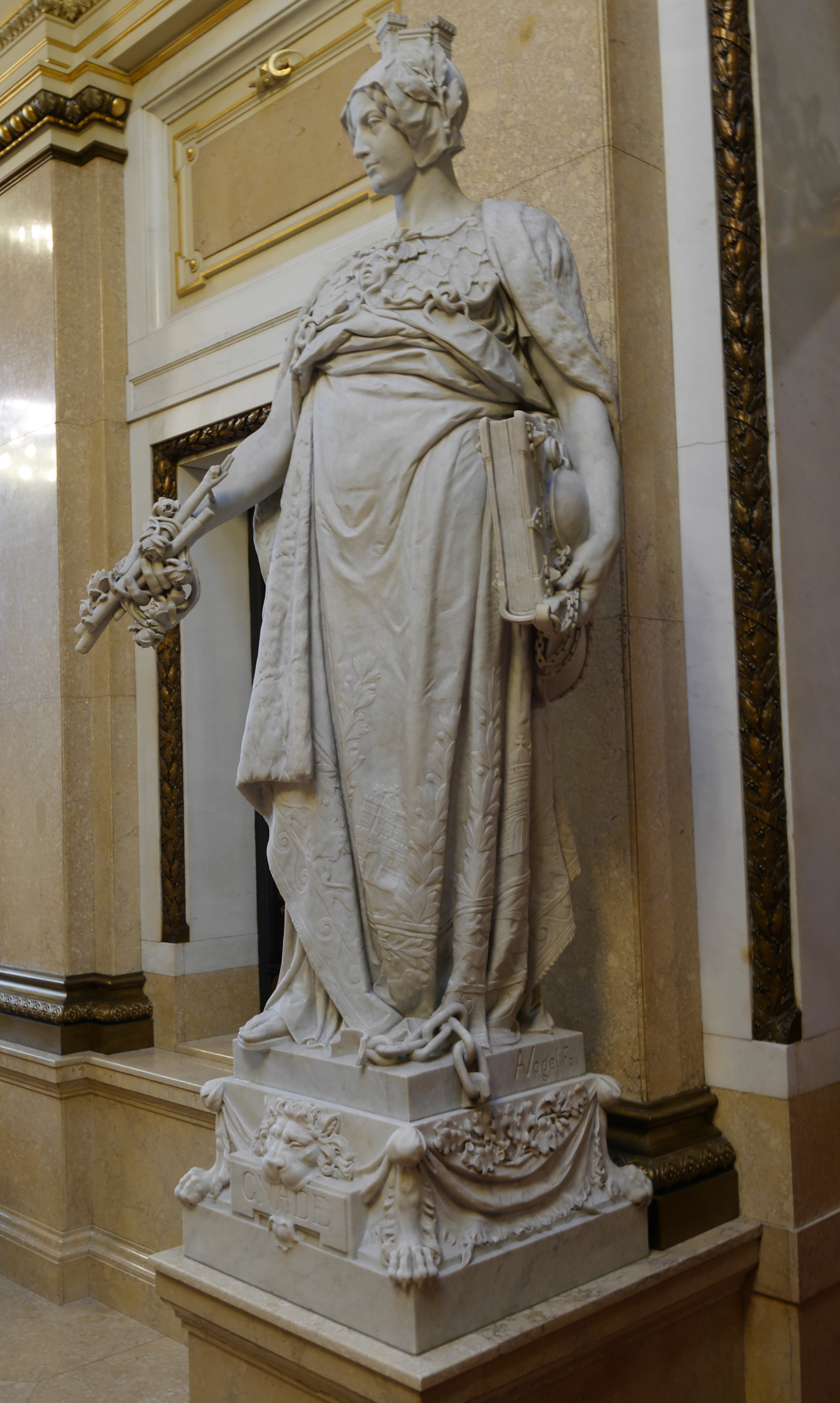
"Grace", Senate wing

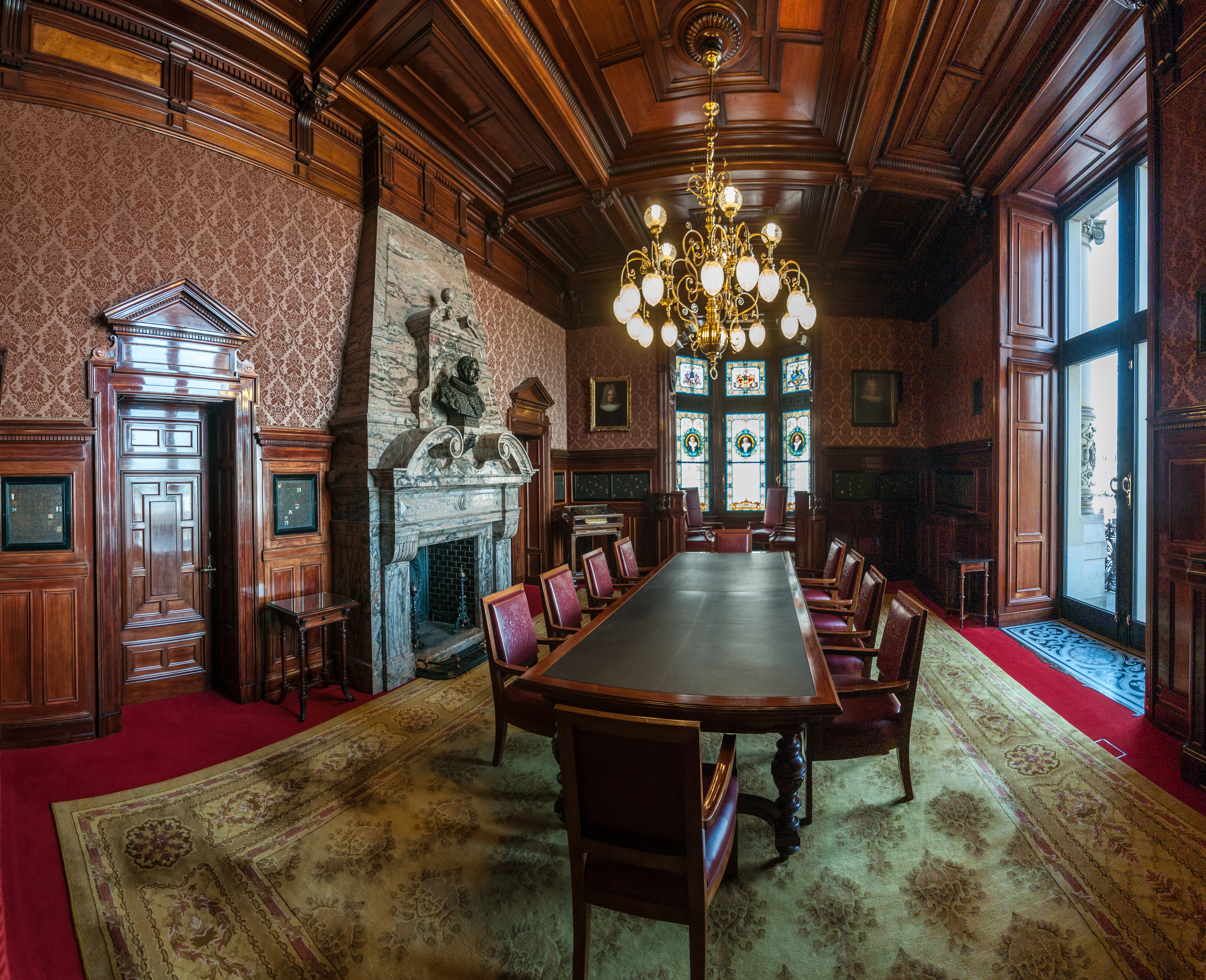
Mayor's office with the city's Golden Book

== Functions ==
The lobby is a public area used for concerts and exhibitions. It is open to the public. The emperor's hall on the first floor is the second-largest reception hall, named after Wilhelm II and functions as a room for official presentations. The mayor's hall was planned as a small meeting room. It is the location where important visitors sign the city's Golden Book take place; dignitaries who have done this include the former German President Paul von Hindenburg and the Dalai Lama. In the left wing is the floor of the Hamburg Parliament. The 121 representatives meet in a room that was renovated during the Nazi era. Only three parts of the ceiling show its original decoration.

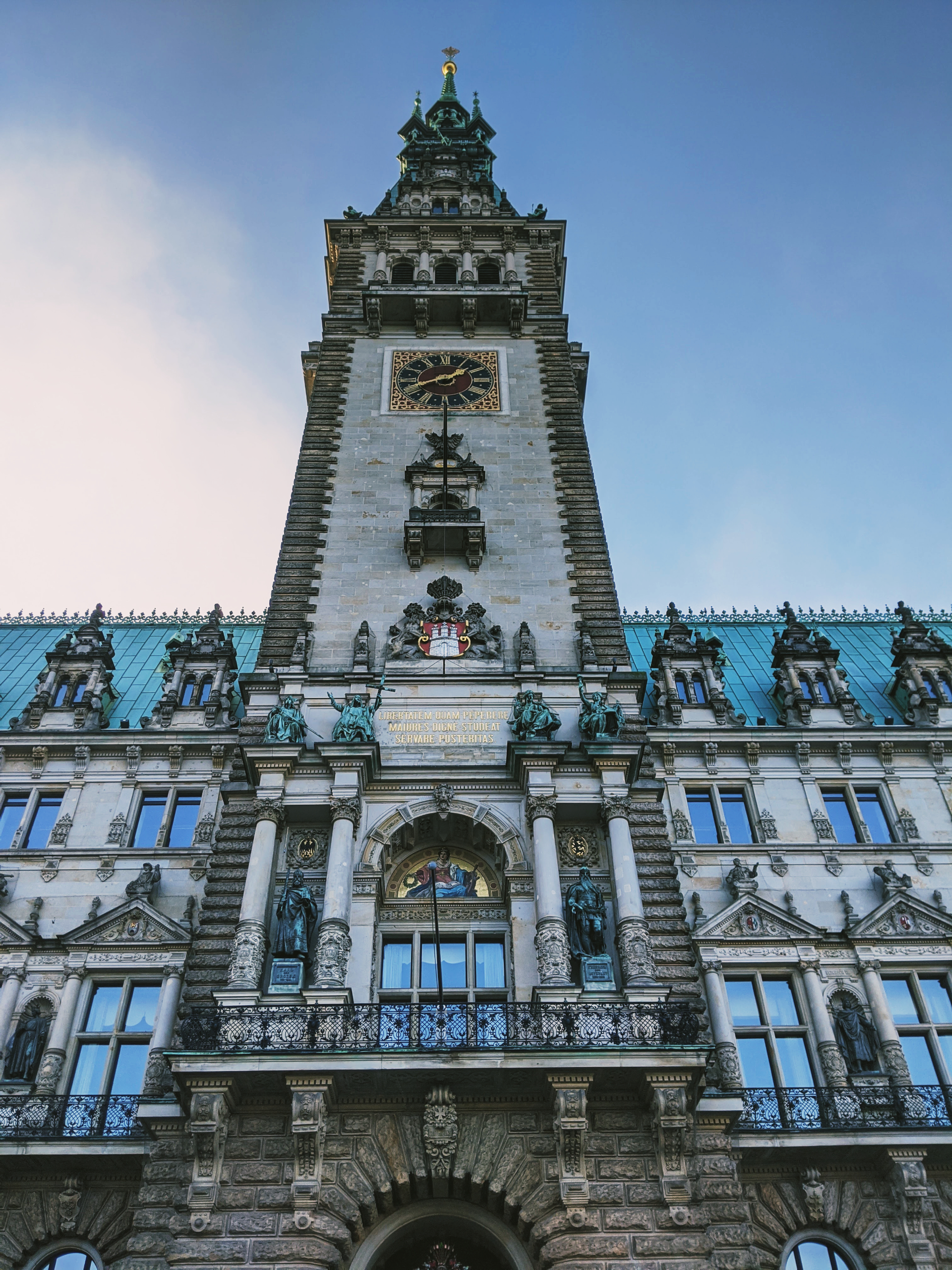
The Hamburg Rathaus

== Gallery ==
Although it is not actually a museum, the city hall takes part in the Long Night of Museums. During the event in Hamburg the motto promoted by the council is "long night in centre of power".

== Neighborhood ==
The city hall is located in the centre of Hamburg. In front of it is a market square, the Rathausmarkt, which is used for events and festivals. At the rear of the town hall is the Hamburg Stock Exchange. The main shopping street, Mönckebergstraße, connects the town hall with the central station. The Binnenalster with the Jungfernstieg station and quay for the Alster ships is directly north of the Rathaus. A nearby architectural landmark is the St. Peter's Church.
