= Martin Haller =

German architect (1835–1925)

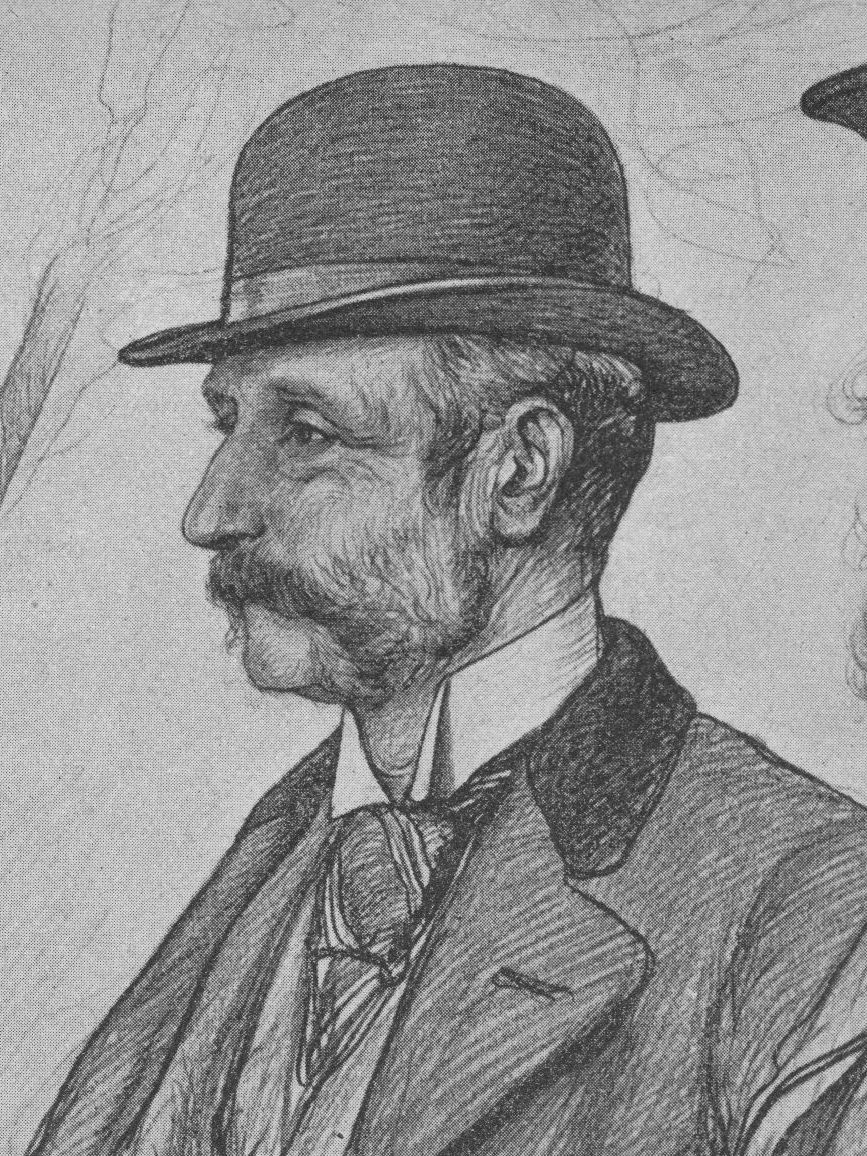
- Haller, from a drawing by Christian Wilhelm Allers (c.1894)
- Born: 1 December 1835; Hamburg
- Died: 26 May 1925 (aged 89); Hamburg
- Occupation: Architect
- Buildings: Hamburg Rathaus; Laeiszhalle

Martin Emil Ferdinand Haller (1835–1925) was a German architect, who designed the Hamburg Rathaus and the building of the Consulate General of the United States in Hamburg, and a member of the Hamburg Parliament.

== Early life and family ==
Haller was born on 1 December 1835 in Hamburg. His father was the jurist Nicolaus Ferdinand Haller (1805–1876), a Mayor of Hamburg. Haller's mother Adele was a Jewish-born daughter of Amschel Oppenheimer. Haller attended the Gymnasium Gelehrtenschule des Johanneums until 1855. Haller studied architecture in Potsdam, Berlin, Paris, and England.

In 1865, Haller married Antonie (née Schramm, 1846–1925) and had a son, Ferdinand (1871–1963), who was deputy director of the HAPAG, and 3 daughters, Antonie and Marie-Ellen.

Haller died on 26 May 1925 in Hamburg.

== Hamburg career ==
In 1861 Haller returned to Hamburg and opened an office. He was 10 years long chairperson of the professional organisation of architects and member of the Hamburg Parliament for 14 years. In 1880 Haller and 8 other architects founded a syndicate and presented the Senate of Hamburg a new draft for the Hamburg Rathaus. In 1886 the construction started.

Haller planned more than 562 building projects.

== Influenced ==
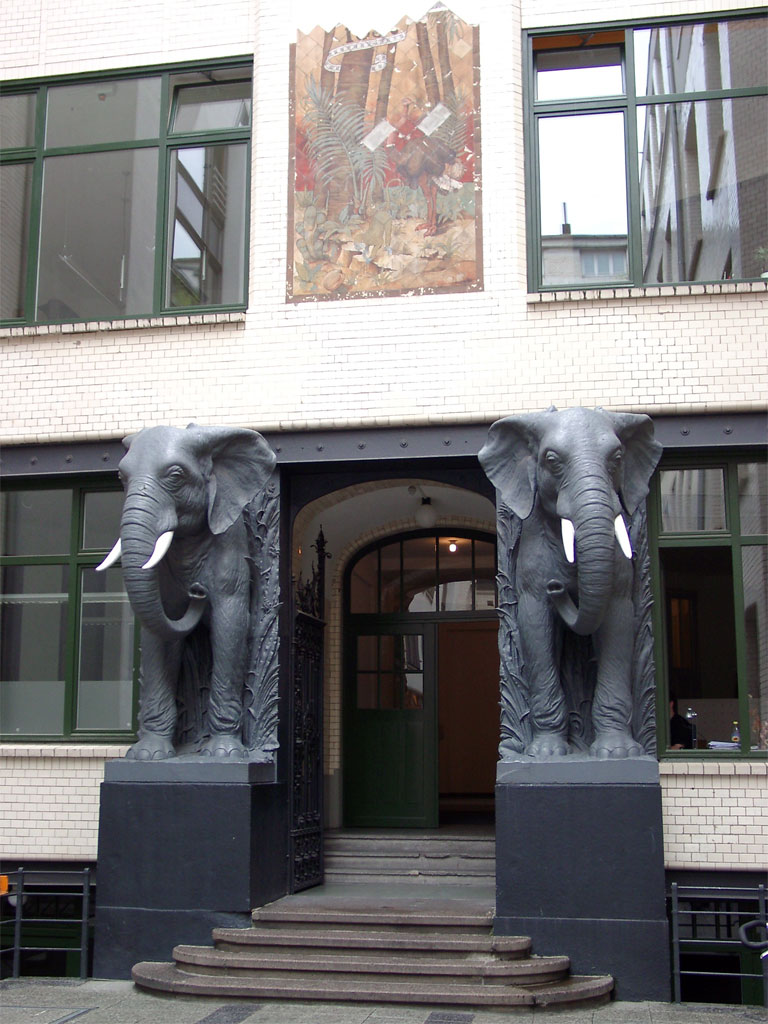
Afrikahaus built from 1900–01, in 2004.

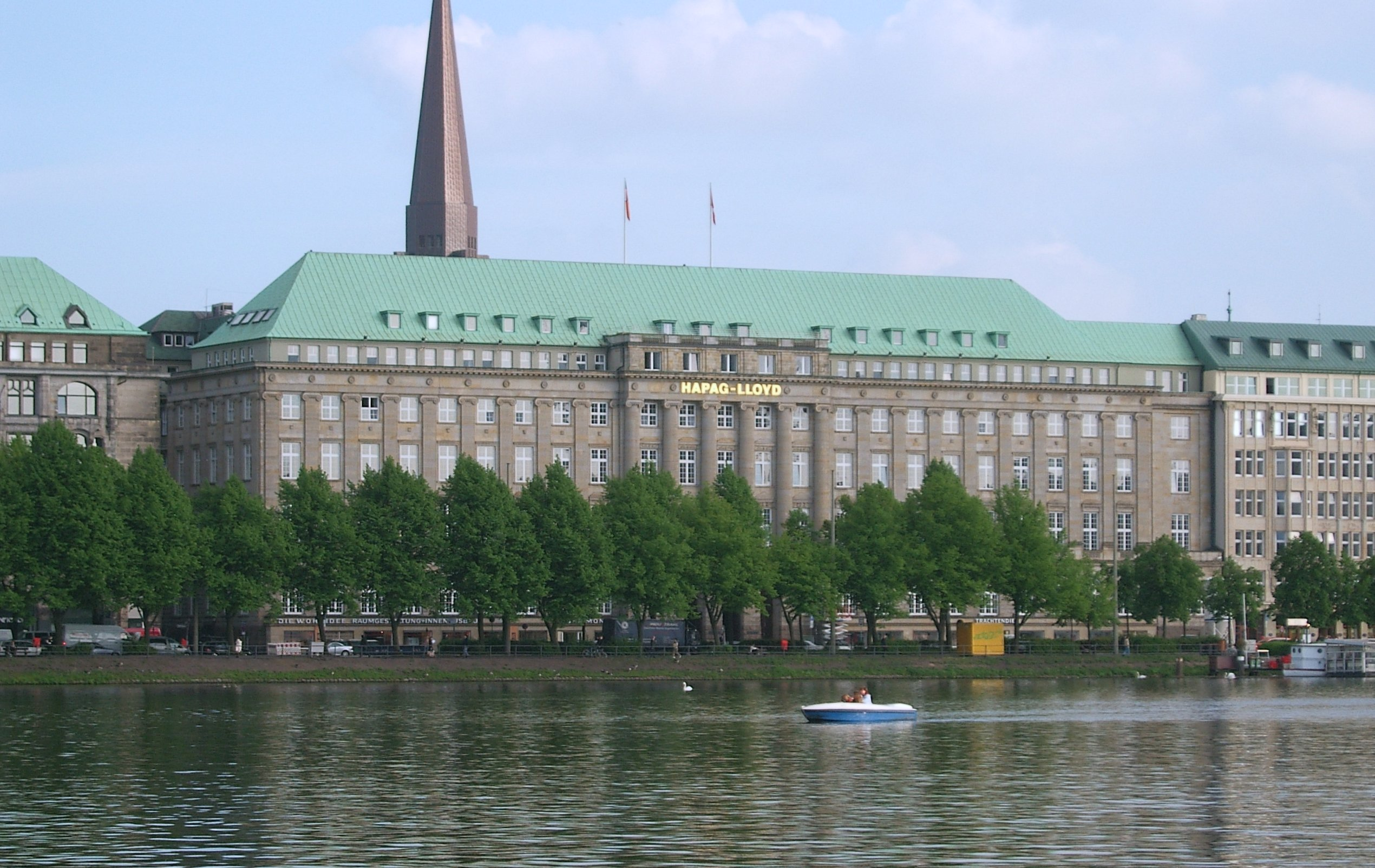
The office building of the HAPAG, built 1901–03, in front of the Binnenalster lake, in 2006.

Haller was influenced by Charles Garnier; the architect of the Paris opera; Gottfried Semper, and the Italian High Renaissance. He disliked the Art Nouveau movement.

=== Selected works ===
- Hamburg Rathaus
- Alsterufer # 27 (now Consulate General of the United States in Hamburg and modified)
- Office building (bank) for M.M.Warburg & CO
- Concert hall Laeiszhalle
- Office building for the Reederei Woermann, coll. Afrikahaus
- Office building for Hamburg-Amerikanische Packetfahrt-Actien-Gesellschaft (HAPAG)
- Hochschule für Musik und Theater Hamburg

== Honors ==
The city of Hamburg honored Haller with a street called Hallerstraße. 53°34′21″N 9°59′20″E
