= Laeiszhalle =

Concert Hall in Hamburg

Coordinates: 53°33′21″N 9°58′51″E

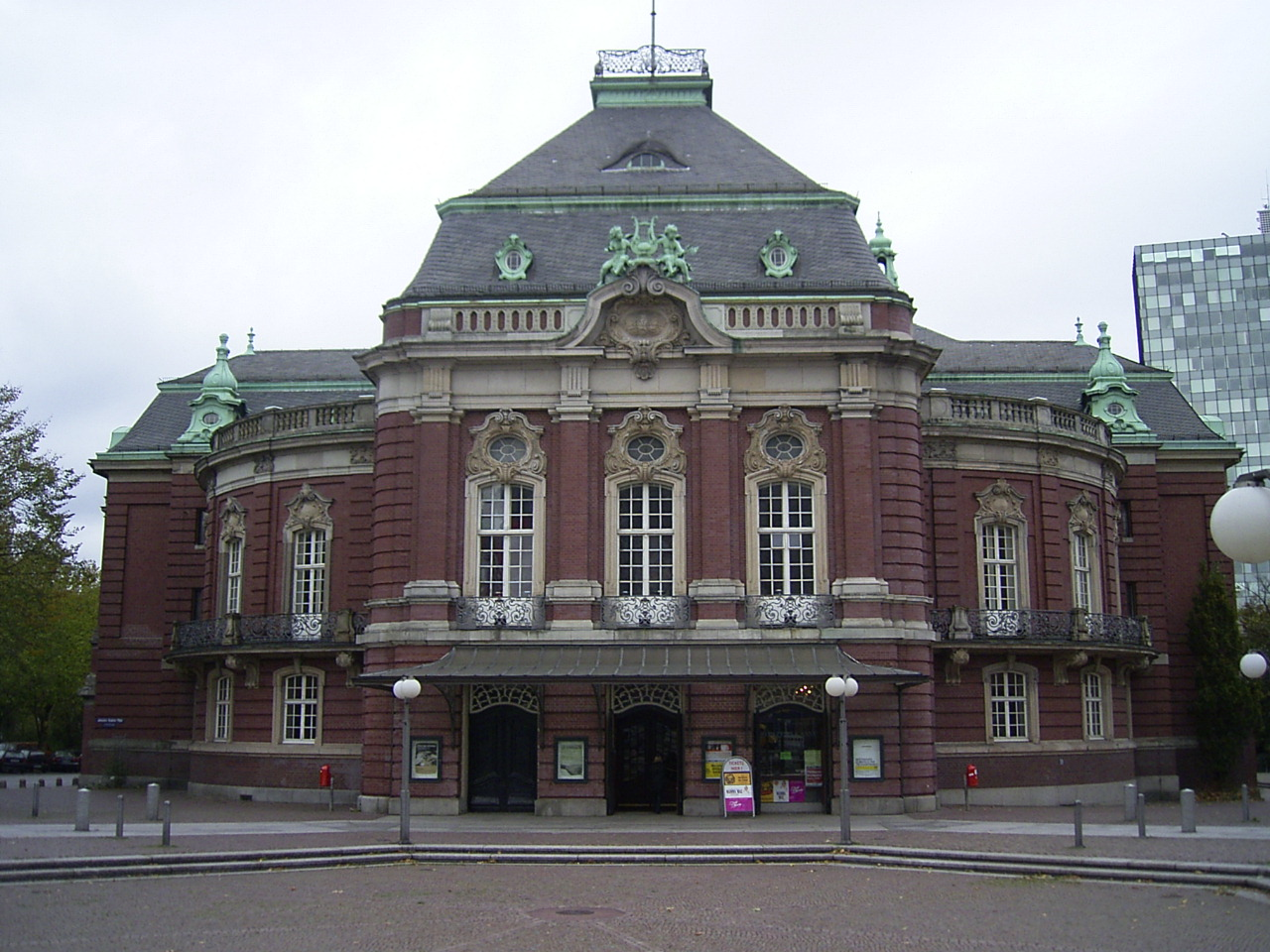
- Interactive map of Laeiszhalle
- Former names: Musikhalle (1908–2005)
- Location: Johannes-Brahms-Platz 20, 20355 Hamburg, Germany
- Capacity: 2,025 (grand hall); 640 (recital hall)
- Type: concert hall
- Public transit: Gänsemarkt (200 m); Johannes-Brahms-Platz

Construction
- Built: 1904–08
- Opened: 4 June 1908
- Architects: Martin Haller and Wilhelm Emil Meerwein

Website
- Venue Website

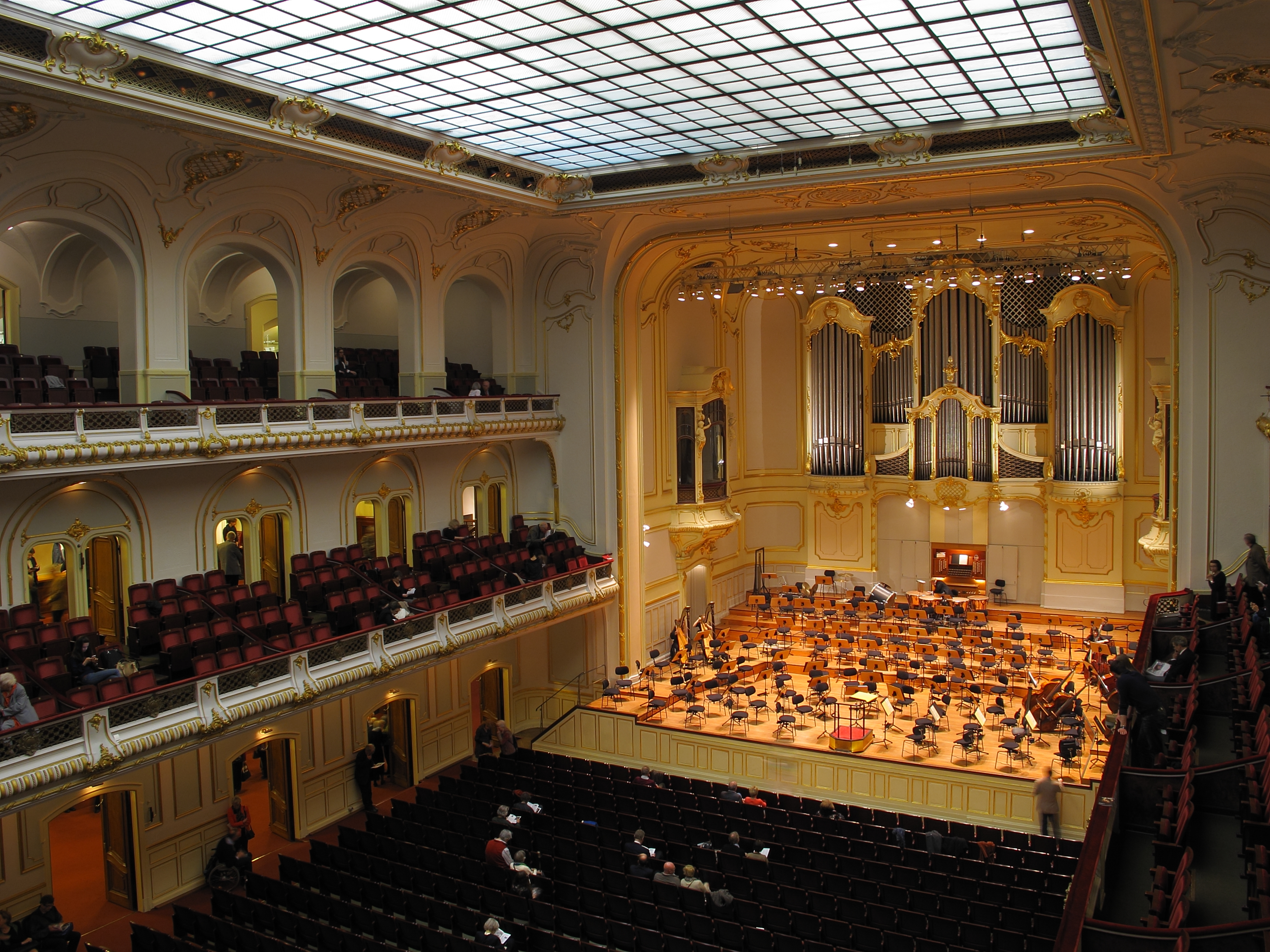
View of the Großer Saal (2014)

The Laeiszhalle (German: [ˈlaɪsˌhalə]), formerly Musikhalle, is a concert hall in the Neustadt of Hamburg, Germany, and home to the Hamburger Symphoniker and the Philharmoniker Hamburg. The hall is named after the German shipowning company F. Laeisz, founder of the concert venue. The Baroque Revival Laeiszhalle was planned by the architect Martin Haller and inaugurated at its location on the Hamburg Wallring on 4 June 1908. At that time, the Musikhalle was Germany's largest and most modern concert hall.

Composers such as Richard Strauss, Sergei Prokofiev, Igor Stravinsky and Paul Hindemith played and conducted their works in the Laeiszhalle. Pianist Vladimir Horowitz gave one of his first international performances in 1926; violinist Yehudi Menuhin gave a guest performance in 1930 at the age of twelve. Following World War II, which it survived intact, the Laeiszhalle experienced an intermezzo when the British occupying forces used the space temporarily as a broadcast studio for their radio station BFN. Maria Callas gave concerts in 1959 and 1962.

From the 1960s the musical repertoire was also expanded to jazz and pop music, with performances by Pink Floyd, Kraftwerk, Lale Andersen, Bee Gees, Lynyrd Skynyrd, Udo Jürgens, Pat Metheny Group, Bill Evans and Elton John. It was one of the venues on the Grateful Dead's legendary and renowned Europe '72 tour - this show, along with all the others in the itinerary, being released as part of the box set Europe '72: The Complete Recordings, as well as individually.

The Laeizhalle has two separate performance spaces. Due to its relatively low capacity and stage layout, the Laeiszhalle is particularly suitable for the performance of classical and early romantic repertoire, and less so for staging large-scale twentieth-century works. The management of both the Elbphilharmonie and the Laeiszhalle are under the direction of one concert company. Christoph Lieben-Seutter became General and Artistic Director in 2007.
