= Rick Springfield discography =

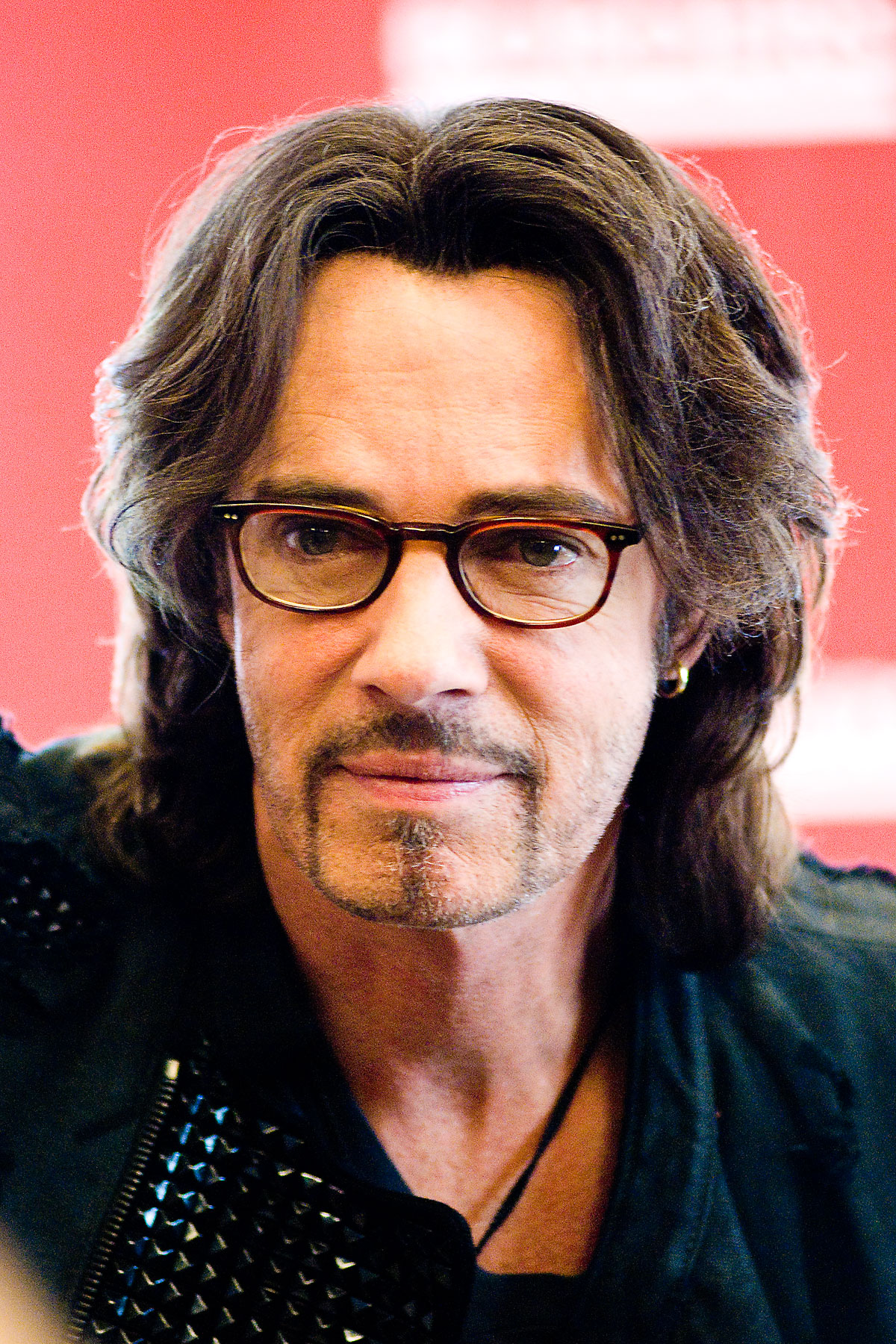
- Springfield in 2010
- Studio albums: 22
- Soundtrack albums: 2
- Live albums: 5
- Compilation albums: 12
- Singles: 34
- Music videos: 11
- No. 1 singles (US): 1

The discography of Australian rock musician Rick Springfield consists of 22 studio albums, 12 compilation albums, five live albums, 34 singles, and 11 music videos. In 1995, Springfield formed a side-project, Sahara Snow, with Tim Pierce on guitar and Bob Marlette on keyboards and percussion, which released a self-titled studio album in 1997. In 2021, he formed a similar side project with the Red Locusts.

== Studio albums ==
List of albums, with selected chart positions
Title	Album details	Peak chart positions			Certifications
Title	Album details	AUS	CAN	US	Certifications
Beginnings	Released: 28 August 1972; Label: Sparmac, (SPL 003) Capitol (SMAS-11047); Format: LP, 8-track, Cassette	15	23	35	
Comic Book Heroes	Released: 17 September 1973; Label: Wizard (ZL-201), Capitol (SMAS-11206), Columbia (KC-32704); Format: LP, 8-track, Cassette	54	—	—	
Mission Magic!	Released: 15 July 1974; Label: Wizard (ZL-205); Format: LP (No US release)	97	—	—	
Wait for Night	Released: 1976^{[A]}; Label: Chelsea (CHL 515, CHL 5005), RCA (AFL1-4235) (1982 reissue); Format: LP, 8-track, Cassette	—	—	159	
Working Class Dog	Released: 14 February 1981; Label: RCA (RCA AFL1-3697, RCA LP 6014, RCA K 6014); Format: LP, 8-track, Cassette	33	33	7	MC: 2× Platinum; RIAA: Platinum; RMNZ: Gold
Success Hasn't Spoiled Me Yet	Released: 23 March 1982; Label: RCA (RCA AFL1-4125, RCA LP 6033, RCA K 6033); Format: LP, 8-track, Cassette	28	6	2	MC: Platinum; RIAA: Platinum
Living in Oz	Released: 18 July 1983; Label: RCA (RCA AFL1-4660, RCA PL 84660, RCA PK 84660); Format: LP, Cassette	45	20	12	MC: Gold; RIAA: Platinum
Hard to Hold	Released: 23 July 1984; Label: RCA (RCA ABL1-4935, RCA BL 84935); Format: LP, Cassette	87	29	16	MC: Gold; RIAA: Platinum
Beautiful Feelings	Released: October 1984^{[B]}; Label: Mercury (824 107-1, 824 107-4); Format: LP, Cassette, CD	—	—	78	
Tao	Released: May 1985; Label: RCA (AJL1-5370, RCA PL 85370); Format: LP, Cassette, CD	85	50	21	RIAA: Gold
Rock of Life	Released: February 1988; Label: RCA (RCA 6620-1-R, RCA 6620-4-R, RCA 6620-2-R); Format: LP, Cassette, CD	—	66	55	
Karma	Released: 13 April 1999; Label: Platinum Entertainment (15095 9561 2), Victor (60519); Format: Cassette, CD	—	—	189	
Shock/Denial/Anger/Acceptance	Released: 24 February 2004; Label: Gomer (99999-2); Format: CD	—	—	—	
The Day After Yesterday	Released: 12 July 2005; Label: Gomer (4812002); Format: CD	—	—	197	
Christmas with You	Released: 6 November 2007; Label: Compass (43737); Format: CD	—	—	—	
Venus in Overdrive	Released: 29 July 2008; Label: New Door (B0011347-02); Format: CD	—	—	28	
My Precious Little One: Lullabies for a New Generation	Released: 10 March 2009; Label: Gomer; Format: CD	—	—	—	
Songs for the End of the World	Released: 9 October 2012; Label: Hip-O; Format: CD	—	—	44	
Rocket Science	Released: 19 February 2016; Label: Frontiers; Format: CD	—	—	69	
The Snake King	Released: 26 January 2018; Label: Frontiers; Format: LP, CD	—	—	—	
Orchestrating My Life	Released: 26 April 2019; Label: August Day; Format: CD	—	—	—	
Springfield	Released: 12 May 2023 ^{[D]}; Label: Iconoclassic, Columbia; Format: CD	—	—	—	
Automatic	Released: 4 August 2023; Label: SongVest; Format: LP, CD	—	—	—	
"—" denotes releases that did not chart.

=== With Sahara Snow ===
List of albums with Sahara Snow
Title	Album details
Sahara Snow	Released: 1997; Label: MTM Music (199623); Format: CD

=== With The Red Locusts ===
List of albums with The Red Locusts
Title	Album details
The Red Locusts	Released: 26 March 2021; Label: Lolipop; Format: LP, CD

== Compilation albums ==
List of compilation albums
Title	Album details
Greatest Hits	Released: 1989^{[C]}; Label: RCA (RCA 9817-1-R, RCA 9817-4-R RCA 9817-2-R); Format: LP, Cassette, CD
Best Of	Released: 1996; Label: Camden (74321 431602); Format: CD
Rick Springfield (The Encore Collection)	Released: 1997; Label: BMG Special Products; Format: CD
The Best of Rick Springfield	Released: 1999; Label: RCA (07863 67797-2); Format: CD
Anthology (Australia only)	Released: 5 April 1999; Label: BMG International; Format: CD
VH1 Behind the Music: The Rick Springfield Collection	Released: 12 September 2000; Label: RCA; Format: CD
The Best of Rick Springfield	Released: 2003; Label: Camden (828765 33422); Format: CD
Platinum & Gold Collection: Rick Springfield (2003) Collections (2006)	Released: 19 August 2003; Re-released with 'Collections' title: 8 May 2006; Label: RCA; Format: CD
Written in Rock: The Rick Springfield Anthology (2005) The Essential Rick Springfield (2011)	Released: 25 April 2005; Re-released with 'Essential' title: 15 March 2011; Label: RCA; Format: CD
We Are the '80s (2006) Playlist: The Very Best of Rick Springfield (2008)	Released: 18 July 2006; Re-released with 'Playlist' title: 8 July 2008; Label: RCA/Legacy; Format: CD
The Early Sound City Sessions	Released: 2007; Label: Voiceprint / Sonic Past Music; Format: CD
Super Hits	Released: 2009; Label: Sony BMG; Format: CD
From the Vault	Credited to Rick Springfield, Jeff Silverman; Released: 2010; Label: Frontiers; Format: CD

== Live albums ==
List of live albums
Title	Album details
The Greatest Hits...Alive	Released: 30 January 2001; Label: Hip-O; Format: CD
Live in Rockford	Released: 24 October 2006; Label: Gomer; Format: DVD
Live and Kickin'	Released: 2 May 2008; Label: Golden Core; Format: CD
Stripped Down	Released: 24 February 2015; Label: Loud & Proud; Format: CD/DVD
Orchestrating My Life: Live	Released: 14 February 2021; Label: August Day; Format: CD, digital download

== Singles ==
Title	Year	Peak chart positions								Certifications	Album
Title	Year	AUS	CAN	CAN AC	UK	US	US AC	US Main.	GER	Certifications	Album
"Speak to the Sky"	1971	6	10	8	—	14	16	—	—		Beginnings
"Hooky Jo"	1972	16	—	—	—	—	—	—	—		Beginnings
"What Would the Children Think?"	1972	38	—	4	—	70	—	—	—		Beginnings
"I'm Your Superman"	1973	—	—	—	—	—	—	—	—		Comic Book Heroes
"Believe in Me"	1973	62	—	—	—	—	—	—	—		Comic Book Heroes
"Streaking the Australian Way"	1974	—	—	—	—	—	—	—	—		Non-album single
"Mission Magic!"	1974	—	—	—	—	—	—	—	—		Mission Magic!
"American Girls"	1974	—	74	—	—	98	—	—	—		Non-album single
"Take a Hand"	1976	—	56	—	—	41	—	—	—		Wait for Night
"Million Dollar Face"	1976	—	—	—	—	—	—	—	—		Wait for Night
"Jessica"	1976	—	—	—	—	—	—	—	—		Wait for Night
"Treat Me Gently in the Morning"	1977	—	—	—	—	—	—	—	—		Wait for Night
"Archangel"	1979	—	—	—	—	—	—	—	—		Wait for Night
"Bruce"	1980	—	—	—	—	—	—	—	—		Non-album single
"Jessie's Girl"	1981	1	6	—	43^{[E]}	1	—	10	—	BPI: Platinum; MC: Gold; RIAA: Gold; RMNZ: 4× Platinum	Working Class Dog
"I've Done Everything for You"	1981	31	40	19	—	8	—	—	—		Working Class Dog
"Love Is Alright Tonite"	1981	—	26	—	—	20	—	40	—		Working Class Dog
"Don't Talk to Strangers"	1982	10	3	3	—	2	30	11	—		Success Hasn't Spoiled Me Yet
"Calling All Girls"	1982	—	—	—	—	—	—	4	—		Success Hasn't Spoiled Me Yet
"What Kind of Fool Am I"	1982	—	41	—	—	21	—	—	—		Success Hasn't Spoiled Me Yet
"I Get Excited"	1982	—	42	—	—	32	—	—	—		Success Hasn't Spoiled Me Yet
"Affair of the Heart"	1983	26	11	—	—	9	—	23	—		Living in Oz
"Human Touch"	1983	92	19	—	23	18	—	34	—		Living in Oz
"Me & Johnny"	1983	—	—	—	—	—	—	—	—		Living in Oz
"Souls"	1983	—	—	—	—	23	—	—	—		Living in Oz
"Love Somebody"	1984	83	13	—	95	5	—	13	23		Hard to Hold
"Don't Walk Away"	1984	—	—	—	—	26	—	41	—		Hard to Hold
"Bop 'Til You Drop"	1984	—	70	—	—	20	—	—	—		Hard to Hold
"Taxi Dancing (Duet with Randy Crawford)/[B-side of "Bop 'Til You Drop"]"	1984	—	—	15	—	59	16	—	—		Hard to Hold
"Bruce" [Re-release]	1984	—	—	—	—	27	—	—	—		Beautiful Feelings
"Celebrate Youth"	1985	—	39	—	80	26	—	—	5		Tao
"State of the Heart"	1985	—	75	—	145	22	—	—	44		Tao
"Dance This World Away" [France, Germany, Japan only]	1985	—	—	—	—	—	—	—	—		Tao
"Rock of Life"	1988	92	28	—	83	22	—	45	—		Rock of Life
"Honeymoon in Beirut"	1988	—	—	—	—	—	—	—	—		Rock of Life
"It's Always Something"	1999	—	—	34	—	—	—	—	—		Karma
"Beautiful You"	2004	—	—	—	—	—	28	—	—		Shock/Denial/Anger/Acceptance
"Broken Wings"	2005	—	—	—	—	—	29	—	—		The Day After Yesterday
"What's Victoria's Secret"	2008	—	—	—	—	—	—	—	—		Venus in Overdrive
"I Hate Myself"	2012	—	—	—	—	—	—	—	—		Songs for the End of the World
"Light This Party Up"	2016	—	—	—	—	—	—	—	—		Rocket Science
"Down"	2016	—	—	—	—	—	—	—	—		Rocket Science
"Little Demon"	2017	—	—	—	—	—	—	—	—		The Snake King
"In the Land of the Blind"	2017	—	—	—	—	—	—	—	—		The Snake King
"Jessie's Girl"	2019	—	—	—	—	—	—	—	—		Orchestrating My Life
"Automatic"	2023	—	—	—	—	—	—	—	—		Automatic
"She Walks With the Angels"	2023	—	—	—	—	—	—	—	—		Automatic
"Exit Wound"	2023	—	—	—	—	—	—	—	—		Automatic
"Love Ain't Cool (Sha Doo Wup)"	2023	—	—	—	—	—	—	—	—		Automatic
"Lose Myself"	2024	—	—	—	—	—	—	—	—		Big Hits: Rick Springfield's Greatest Hits, Volume 2

"—" denotes a title that did not chart, or was not released in that territory.

== Other appearances ==
Year	Song	Album
1994	"Jessie's Girl" [Live Version]	Grammy's Greatest Moments Volume IV
2013	"The Man That Never Was" with Dave Grohl, Taylor Hawkins, Chris Shiflett and Pat Smear	Sound City: Real to Reel

== Notes ==
- A Wait for Night was originally released on Chelsea Records in 1976. It was re-released by RCA Records in 1982 and peaked on the Billboard 200 in 1983.
- B Beautiful Feelings was originally recorded in 1978 but was not issued at that time. Mercury Records re-recorded the instrumentation and released it in late 1984 without Springfield's approval. It peaked on the Billboard 200 in 1985. In 1980, "Bruce" had been released by Springfield as a non-album single; it became the lead track of the album and was re-issued by Mercury Records by December 1984. The original 1978 recordings were released by Springfield in 2007 as The Early Sound City Sessions.
- C Greatest Hits was released by Evergreen Records in 1988 as a CD with ten tracks. RCA Records issued a twelve-track compilation of the same name in 1989 as a CD and LP.
- D Springfield was originally supposed to be released in 1974, however Columbia decided to cancel it after it was complete. It would be released to the public on May 12, 2023.
- E "Jessie's Girl" did not chart in the UK until 1984, when it was re-released following the success of "Human Touch".
