= Playlist: The Very Best of Rick Springfield =

2008 compilation album by Rick Springfield

Playlist: The Very Best Of Rick Springfield

Greatest hits album by Rick Springfield
- Released: 18 July 2006 (We Are the '80s); 17 June 2008 (Playlist)
- Recorded: 1981–1988
- Genre: Rock
- Length: 49:47
- Label: RCA Records
- Producer: Keith Olsen, Rick Springfield and Bill Drescher

Rick Springfield chronology
Christmas with You (2007)	Playlist: The Very Best Of Rick Springfield (2006)	Venus in Overdrive (2008)

Playlist: The Very Best Of Rick Springfield is a compilation album by Rick Springfield, released by RCA Records in 2008. This collection was originally released with the title We Are the '80s in 2006 but was re-released with the "Playlist" title in 2008, containing the same songs and running order. Both are essentially an upgrade to Springfield's similar Greatest Hits (1989), adding two additional tracks.

Springfield began his recording career in the late 1960s and had limited success in the United States with his 1972 album Beginnings and its single "Speak to the Sky." He released three more albums through 1976, but his musical career would not take off in earnest until 1981 with the release of his first RCA album Working Class Dog. The single "Jessie's Girl" from that album gave Springfield his first and only number one single in the U.S., and won him a Grammy Award for Best Rock Vocal Performance, Male.

Springfield's success continued throughout the 1980s with albums such as Success Hasn't Spoiled Me Yet (1982) that contained the singles "Don't Talk to Strangers" and "What Kind of Fool Am I", and 1983's Living in Oz with the hits "Affair of the Heart" and "Human Touch". Rick Springfield starred in the 1984 film Hard to Hold and the accompanying soundtrack album included his songs "Love Somebody" and "Don't Walk Away." In the mid-1980s, Springfield stated that he started dealing with serious spiritual issues and he began to write more about those in his music. His 1985 release Tao with the singles "State of the Heart" and "Celebrate Youth" saw Rick moving in a more mature and spiritual direction. His 1988 album Rock of Life would be his last album of new material until 1997's Sahara Snow, and contained Springfield's final (of 17) Billboard Top 40 single in the USA.

This compilation contains the majority of Springfield's hit singles from 1981 to 1988, by far his most successful years. The only Billboard Hot 100 charting singles from the 1980s not included are "Souls", "Taxi Dancing," and "Bruce."

== Reception ==
Professional ratings
Review scores
Source	Rating
Allmusic	4.5/5 stars

Writing for Allmusic, critic Stephen Thomas Erlewine commented on the We Are the '80s release: "As the title suggests, this 14-track compilation focuses entirely on Springfield's '80s work ... and it does a good job of rounding up the biggest singles ... listeners will find this to be a first-rate overview of Springfield's popular peak."

== Track listing ==
All tracks written by Rick Springfield except as noted.

1. "Jessie's Girl" – 3:15
2. "I've Done Everything for You" (Sammy Hagar) – 3:19
3. "Love Is Alright Tonite" (45 version) – 3:23
4. "Don't Talk to Strangers" – 2:59
5. "What Kind of Fool Am I" – 3:21
6. "I Get Excited" – 2:34
7. "Affair of the Heart" (45 version) (Rick Springfield, Danny Tate, Blaise Tosti) – 3:50
8. "Human Touch" (45 version) – 3:58
9. "Love Somebody" – 3:35
10. "Don't Walk Away" (45 version) – 3:41
11. "Bop 'Til You Drop" (45 version) – 4:01
12. "State of the Heart" (Eric McCusker, Rick Springfield, Tim Pierce) – 4:04
13. "Celebrate Youth" – 3:55
14. "Rock of Life" – 3:52

=== Greatest Hits (1989) ===
Greatest Hits

Greatest hits album by Rick Springfield
- Released: 1989
- Recorded: 1981-1988
- Genre: Rock
- Length: 41:38
- Label: RCA Records
- Producer: Keith Olsen, Rick Springfield and Bill Drescher

Rick Springfield chronology
Rock of Life (1988)	Greatest Hits (1989)	Karma (1999)

Rick Springfield's earlier Greatest Hits (1989) is almost identical to Playlist, containing 12 of the 14 songs in the same order, although tracks 2, 6, 7 and 12 are all shorter edits/fades.

1. "Jessie's Girl" – 3:14
2. "I've Done Everything for You" (edit) (Sammy Hagar) – 2:42
3. "Love Is Alright Tonite" – 3:18
4. "Don't Talk to Strangers" – 3:00
5. "What Kind of Fool Am I" – 3:20
6. "Affair of the Heart" (edit) (Rick Springfield, Danny Tate, Blaise Tosti) – 3:34
7. "Human Touch" (radio edit) – 3:45
8. "Love Somebody" – 3:35
9. "Bop 'Til You Drop" (7" version) – 3:58
10. "State of the Heart" (Eric McCusker, Rick Springfield, Tim Pierce) – 3:58
11. "Celebrate Youth" – 3:51
12. "Rock of Life" (edit) – 3:28

== Production notes ==
- "Jessie's Girl" and "I've Done Everything for You"

Produced by Keith Olsen
"Love Is Alright Tonight"
Produced by Rick Springfield and Bill Drescher
From the RCA album Working Class Dog AFL1-3697 (1981)

- "Don't Talk to Strangers", What Kind of Fool Am I" and "I Get Excited"

Produced by Keith Olsen
From the RCA album Success Hasn't Spoiled Me Yet AFL1-4125 (1982)

- "Affair of the Heart" and "Human Touch"

Produced by Rick Springfield and Bill Drescher
From the RCA album Living in Oz AFL1-4660 (1983)

- "Love Somebody", "Don't Walk Away" and "Bop 'Til You Drop"

Produced by Rick Springfield and Bill Drescher
From the RCA album Hard to Hold AFL1-4935 (1984)

- "State of the Heart" and "Celebrate Youth"

Produced by Rick Springfield and Bill Drescher
From the RCA album Tao AFL1-5370 (1985)

- "Rock of Life"

Produced by Keith Olsen & Rick Springfield
From the Album Rock of Life RCA 6620-2-R (1988)

All songs originally mastered by Greg Fulginiti

=== 2008 Compilation ===
- Compilation Produced by Jeremy Holiday and Rob Santos
- Remastered by Joseph M. Palmaccio at Sony Music Studios, New York
