= Stripped Down =

Live album by Rick Springfield
- Released: 24 February 2015
- Genre: Rock
- Length: 48:53
- Labels: Loud & Proud Records

Rick Springfield chronology
Songs for the End of the World (2012)	Stripped Down (2015)	Rocket Science (2016)

Professional ratings
Review scores
Source	Rating
AllMusic	3.5/5 stars
Classic Rock Revisited	B

Stripped Down is a live album by rock musician Rick Springfield. Released on 24 February 2015 as a CD/DVD set, it features 'stripped down' songs recorded live, including the new song "If Wishes Were Fishes".

== Track listing ==
Disc 1
No.	Title	Length
1.	"Affair of the Heart"	4:23
2.	"Love Is Alright Tonite"	3:47
3.	"I've Done Everything for You"	2:47
4.	"Painted Girl"	2:14
5.	"Oh Well"	1:57
6.	"Love Somebody"	2:43
7.	"Baby Blue"	3:39
8.	"Rollin’ & Tumblin’"	3:21
9.	"If Wishes Were Fishes"	4:55
10.	"Don't Talk to Strangers"	2:46
11.	"April 24th, 1981/My Father’s Chair"	6:36
12.	"Me & Johnny"	4:09
13.	"Human Touch"	2:26
14.	"Jessie's Girl"	3:10

== Charts ==
Year	Chart	Position
2015	Billboard Independent Albums	24
