= Mission: Magic! =

- Presented by: Filmation
- Voices of: Lola Fisher; Howard Morris; Erika Scheimer; Lane Scheimer; Rick Springfield
- Country of origin: United States
- No. of seasons: 1
- No. of episodes: 16

Production
- Producers: Norm Prescott; Lou Scheimer
- Running time: 30 minutes
- Production company: Filmation

Original release
- Network: ABC
- Release: September 8 – December 22, 1973

Related
- The Brady Bunch; The Brady Kids

Mission: Magic! is an American Saturday morning animated series starring rock star Rick Springfield and is a spin-off of The Brady Kids, produced by Filmation. 16 episodes aired on ABC from September 8 to December 22, 1973. It was also broadcast in Springfield's native Australia, where Springfield was then a bigger celebrity.

The show involved Miss Tickle, a magical teacher who could transport her students to fantasy realms through her magic blackboard.

== Characters and format ==
Even though he still spoke with a pronounced Australian accent in the mid-1970s, Springfield provided his own voice for his animated doppelgänger. On the show, Springfield always wore white pants and a white sweater which sported on the front an encircled lowercase "r" with a lightning bolt in the background; this design was taken from the back cover of his 1973 album Comic Book Heroes.

Springfield was joined by a cast of characters:

- Miss Tickle, a bubbly teacher

and six students:

  - Kim, an Asian girl, who is the leader of "The Adventurers Club".
  - Vinnie, who spoke with a thick New York accent and often confused elaborate words.
  - Carol, a blonde girl who had a crush on Springfield.
  - Socks, a quirky Jughead-like character who wore a light blue hat.
  - Franklin, a black athlete.
  - Harvey, a short, stocky, and bespectacled nerd.

They were involved in a weekly after-school group called "The Adventurers Club". In the first episode, the club was visited in class by the school principal Mr. Samuels, who knew nothing of Miss Tickle's magical abilities.

Almost every episode began by Rick communicating with the Club via an enchanted gramophone telling them where he was and either inviting them to come along, or transmitting a distress message of some form. Miss Tickle would aim her magic ring at Tut Tut, a ceramic cat on her desk who would come to life after Miss Tickle recited the incantation:

"O Tut Tut, cat of ancient lore,
"'Tis time to draw the magic door."

After drawing a magic door on the blackboard, Miss Tickle, Tut Tut and the students would fly through the door and meet up with Springfield and his familiar, an owl named Ptolemy. In their travels to otherworldly lands and times, they would solve mysteries, fix problems, or help people in need. At the middle or end of each show, Springfield performed a song, its lyrics often tying into the message of that week's story. An album with most of the songs from the series was released in 1974, followed by a CD version in 2004.

== Cast ==
- Lola Fisher as Miss Tickle
- Howard Morris as Socks, Vinnie, Mr. Samuels, Tut Tut, Ptolemy, additional voices
- Erika Scheimer as Kim, Carol
- Lane Scheimer as Harvey, Franklin
- Rick Springfield as himself

== Episodes ==
No.	Title	Song(s)	Original release date
1	"The Land of Backwards"	"You'd Better Think Twice"	September 8, 1973
The Adventurers Club goes to the Land of Backwards, where they meet poet Shelly Percy and contend with Big Billy and his henchman. The trouble is that they are arrested when they return stolen jewels. They escape and save the day. Shelley expresses his joy by crying, showing that everything is done in reverse in this land after all.
2	"Modran"	"Catch Me If You Can"	September 15, 1973
Modran and his three minions, Bell, Booke, and Kendall, steal gold so that Modran can win a tournament by cheating. Miss Tickle and company go to the Land of Prestidigitation to stop them. Socks releases a genie, and Modran captures Carol, Kim, Ptolemy, and Tut-Tut, intending to use them as insurance to guarantee that he will win the title of World's Greatest Magician.
3	"Dissonia"	"Love Is the Key"	September 22, 1973
The Adventurers Club visits a land where three music-hating villains have created a music eliminator to wipe out all the music in the world. Miss Tickle tries using her magic to destroy the machine, only to realize that it is indestructible. Can Rick and Tickle restore music to the world?
4	"Land of Hyde and Go Seek"	"If We Help One Another"	September 29, 1973
The group visits a land where Colonel Kadiddle is threatened by invaders who only want the substance that can change their hairstyles. Miss Tickle uses her magic to make peace between the warring factions.
5	"The City Inside the Earth"	"Yes I Am"	October 6, 1973
While visiting the Carlsbad Caverns, the Adventurers Club is summoned by Rick to a city beneath the Earth's surface. There, they run into Professor Fahrenheit, who seeks to claim the underground city for himself.
6	"2600 A.D."	"You Can't Judge a Book"	October 13, 1973
Miss Tickle and the students travel into the distant future. They discover that in 2600 A.D., Omni the robot is the ruler of humans. Omni turns out not to be so evil when a meteor heads for Earth. In desperation, he asks Miss Tickle and Rick to help him.
7	"Something Fishy"	"Free and Easy"	October 20, 1973
The team finds danger in an underwater city. Dr. Manta is using his power over the water to dominate the subjects. In addition, he has captured Socks and Vinnie. Can Miss Tickle end the villain's threat before innocent people end up in a watery grave?
8	"Giant Steppes"	"You Can Really Do It (If You Try)"	October 27, 1973
When Rick and his friend Billy are captured by the female giant Madame Mammoth, Miss Tickle has to come to their rescue. The Adventurers Club's mission this time is to restore the miniaturized Billy to his rightful place as ruler of the land.
9	"Statue of Limitations"	"I Want You"	November 3, 1973
The club goes to modern-day Paris to investigate the theft of a statue called "The Contemplator". Female stage magician Trix Le Grande is a suspect, as are Pierre La Hoax and the Artful Codger. Further complicating matters is the fact that each of the three has his or her own Contemplator.
10	"Will the Real Rick Springfield Please Stand Up?"	"It's Driving Me Crazy"	November 10, 1973
Miss Tickle cannot figure out why Rick is being so hard on Ptolemy. It soon turns out that "Rick" and "Ptolemy" are actually the Chameleon and Arlo, a pair of crooks who can change their appearances to be anyone they want. They have entered our world through the magic door. Eventually, both men pose as Rick, creating further chaos.
11	"Doctor Astro"	"We're Gonna Have a Good Time"	November 17, 1973
Miss Tickle and her students go after Dr. Astro, who has stolen the Golden Horns and uses their power to bring Zodiac signs to life.
12	"Doctor Daguerreotype"	"On the Other Side"	November 24, 1973
Dr. Daguerreotype has invented a camera that can turn people and objects into photographs. He and his accomplices, Rhett and Ina, use it to photograph the magic door so that they can steal famous landmarks. When the Adventurers Club pursues them, the villains turn all but Miss Tickle and Rick into photographs. The villains' plan to photograph the adults backfires, and they end up on film themselves. Miss Tickle restores her friends and the magic door to normal so that they can return safely.
13	"Nephren"	"I Know That It's Magic"	December 1, 1973
While on a mission to restore the City of Antiquity, Miss Tickle contends with Nephren, an ancient Egyptian queen who has come back to life. This queen's magic proves so powerful that Miss Tickle ends up exhausted. But both women have to join forces to rescue Nephren's lackeys, who are trapped inside a pyramid.
14	"Modran Returns"	"Just Gotta Sing" (fan sites) or "If We Help One Another" (DVD release)	December 8, 1973
Modran lures Miss Tickle and her students into his world by using Rick as bait. This time, the sorcerer's scheme is to steal Tut-Tut, who turns out to be the key to the magic door. The Adventurers Club must get Tut-Tut back so they can return to their world.
15	"Horse Feathers"	"Welcome to the Rodeo" & "Sing Me a Song" (sung by Miss Tickle)	December 15, 1973
The Adventurers Club attends a rodeo in a land beyond the magic door. When the rodeo's prize money suddenly vanishes, the Adventurers Club investigates the three most likely suspects.
16	"A Light Mystery"	"Starlight, Starbright"	December 22, 1973
After he delivers his speech about being named Science Student of the Year, Franklin and the others discover that a generator has been stolen. The Adventurers Club goes to the Land of Lights to get it back. There are three suspects: Count Celesta, Madame Marquee, and Baron Borealis. Each one rules a different province, but one seeks to become the ruler of the entire land.

NOTE: All the main songs appearing in the series were written and performed by Rick Springfield. Each song runs about 90 seconds, edited or faded from the versions later released on the 1974 soundtrack album.

== Soundtrack album ==
Mission: Magic!

Studio album by Rick Springfield
- Released: July 15, 1974
- Recorded: 1973
- Genre: Pop rock
- Length: 40:20
- Label: Wizard Records (Australia)

Rick Springfield chronology
Comic Book Heroes (1973)	Mission: Magic! (1974)	Wait for Night (1976)

Mission: Magic! is the third solo studio album by Australian musician Rick Springfield, and is an almost complete song soundtrack to the 1973 cartoon series. Only about 90 seconds of each song was used in the TV show, but the album contains the full-length versions of every song from the series, except for episode 5's song and episode 15's second song which was the only one in the series sung by Miss Tickle, not Springfield. None of the show's score, incidental music or Miss Tickle's brief melodic incantations were included. The album was released in 1974 several months after the TV series' initial run had finished, and only in Australia, even though the cartoon was produced in the United States. Possibly because of rights issues, no song from Mission: Magic! has ever appeared on any of the many official Rick Springfield compilation albums.

All songs on the album were written by Rick Springfield.

1. "We're Gonna Have a Good Time" (2:39)
2. "It's Driving Me Crazy" (2:55)
3. "Free and Easy" (2:38)
4. "You Can Do It (If You Try)" (2:57)
5. "On the Other Side" (2:22)
6. "You Can't Judge a Book" (2:37)
7. "Love Is the Key" (2:29)
8. "You'd Better Think Twice" (2:13)
9. "Welcome to the Rodeo" (2:49)
10. "I Want You" (2:39)
11. "Just Gotta Sing" (2:30)
12. "If We Help One Another" (2:33)
13. "Starlight, Starbright" (2:03)
14. "Catch Me If You Can" (2:17)
15. "I Know That It's Magic" (2:17)
16. "Theme from Mission: Magic!" (2:22)

Total running time: 40:20

=== Re-releases ===
The Mission: Magic! album has been re-released in various years and territories under the following titles:

- Just Gotta Sing (K-Tel) – only 13 tracks
- Big Hits (Premore) – only 10 tracks
- Greatest Hits (Evergreen; 1988) – only 9 tracks plus "Speak to the Sky"
- Backtracks (Renaissance Records; 1999) – all 16 tracks
- Speak to the Sky (Laserlight; 2001) – only 9 tracks plus "Speak to the Sky" (1972)
- Catch Me If You Can (Renaissance Records; 2006) – all 16 tracks plus "Take a Hand" (1976) and "Speak to the Sky"
- Fan-Tastic Rick Springfield (Ba-ba; 2009) – all 16 tracks
- Rick Springfield (Suite 201; 2009) – all 16 tracks

== Home media ==
BCI Eclipse LLC (under its Ink & Paint classic animation entertainment label), under license from Entertainment Rights, released Mission: Magic! – The Complete Series on DVD in Region 1 on May 8, 2007. The 2-disc set includes all 16 episodes, uncut and digitally remastered for optimum audio and video quality, and presented in its original broadcast presentation and original production order. The 2-Disc set also includes many special features.

DVD name	Ep No.	Release date	Additional information
Mission: Magic! - The Complete Series	16	May 8, 2007	Mission: Magic! Spotlight Interview with Producer Lou Scheimer; Mission: Magic! Spotlight Interview with Voice Actor Erika Scheimer; "The Magic of Filmation" Documentary; Mission: Magic! Image Galleries; Booklet with Episode Guide and Trivia; DVD-ROM Features; Trailers from Ink & Paint

== See also ==
- The Magic School Bus, edutainment franchise with a similar premise
