= I Get Excited =

"I Get Excited" may refer to:

- "I Get Excited", a single from Rick Springfield's 1982 album Success Hasn't Spoiled Me Yet
- "I Get Excited (You Get Excited Too)", the b-side to the Pet Shop Boys' 1988 single "Heart"
