= Christmas with You =

Christmas with You may refer to:

- Christmas with You (Clint Black album)
- Christmas with You (Rick Springfield album)
- Christmas with You (film), a 2022 American romantic comedy film
