= Matt Bissonette (musician) =

American bass player

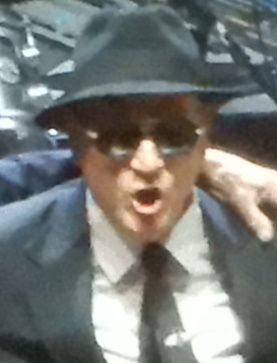
- Bissonette in 2018

Background information
- Born: July 25, 1961 (age 64)
- Genres: Jazz; jazz fusion; progressive metal; instrumental rock
- Occupations: Musician
- Instruments: Bass; vocals
- Years active: 1980s–present
- Member of: Elton John Band
- Formerly of: David Lee Roth Band; Ringo Starr and the Roundheads; Electric Light Orchestra

Matt Bissonette (born July 25, 1961) is an American bass player and vocalist. According to Guitar 9, an online musicianship magazine, he has played bass and other stringed instruments on at least 22 albums, with music styles ranging from jazz, jazz fusion, progressive metal and instrumental rock. Bissonette has played bass with performers such as David Lee Roth (1987–1992), Jeff Lynne and ELO (2001), Joe Satriani, Ringo Starr (2003–2005) and Elton John (2012–2023). He is the brother of drummer Gregg Bissonette.

== Career ==
Bissonette attended the University of North Texas's jazz music program. In the early- to mid-1980s, he toured and recorded with jazz trumpeter Maynard Ferguson. For part of his time in the Ferguson band, he played alongside his brother Gregg, which the brothers have done several times in their careers.

Bissonette toured and played with Caspar McCloud for Caspar's Self Portrait album produced by Ahmet Ertegun for Atlantic Records 1982–83.

In late 1987, he replaced Billy Sheehan in the David Lee Roth band. Along with guitar innovator Steve Vai, Matt's brother Gregg (on drums) and keyboardist Brett Tuggle, Matt toured the world behind the former Van Halen vocalist's Billboard #6 album Skyscraper. While on tour with Roth, Bissonette sang the difficult high harmonies made famous in VH classics, such as "Runnin' with the Devil".

In 1989, Bissonette relocated to Vancouver with Roth, his brother Gregg, guitar prodigy Jason Becker and guitarist Steve Hunter, to record the Billboard top 20 album A Little Ain't Enough. Following another world tour in 1991, the Bissonette brothers left the David Lee Roth band. That year, Matt joined Joe Satriani's band.

Following Bissonette's five-year stint with Roth, he played with several other major songwriters, including Brian Wilson (of The Beach Boys), Don Henley (of The Eagles); Bissonette also played with Julian Lennon, Steve Perry (of Journey), Ty Tabor (of King's X), Peter Frampton, and on Gregg Bissonette's solo album.

Bissonette played with Beatles tribute supergroup Yellow Matter Custard, which performed a handful of shows in 2003 and 2011.

In 2003, Bissonette reunited with his brother to back Ringo Starr on a US tour. In 2004, Matt played with vocalist Boz Scaggs on Scaggs' Greatest Hits Live CD and DVD.

In June 2005, the Bissonette brothers once again backed Starr at live shows at Irving Plaza in New York City in June 2005; the Genesee Theatre in Waukegan, IL for the PBS show SoundStage; and the El Rey Theatre in Los Angeles, CA, as well as on several US TV appearances (CBS This Morning, etc.)

Following his stint with Starr, in 2006, Bissonette became the bass player for Rick Springfield, while singing in his own band the Squirts. Springfield and Bissonette collaborated on Springfield's Venus in Overdrive, which Bissonette co-produced. That same year, he is notable for playing bass with trailer rock musical band Globus on their album Epicon.

For over a decade until 2023, Bissonette was the bass player for Elton John, replacing Bob Birch. After John retired from touring, Bissonette played bass for REO Speedwagon on its 2024 tour, and after that band splintered, he continuing along with lead singer Kevin Cronin, touring with Kevin Cronin Band in 2025, including a lengthy summer tour that year.

Bissonette also played on the theme songs to the television shows Friends, Just Shoot Me! and The Tracey Ullman Show.

== Discography ==
=== With DarWin ===
- Five Steps on the Sun (2024)

=== With the Mustard Seeds ===
- s/t (1996)
- Red (1998)
- III (2008)

=== With the Squirts ===
- s/t (2003)
- Resquirted (2006)

=== With Jeff Lynne ===
- Zoom Tour Live (2001)

=== With Jughead ===
- s/t (2002)

=== With David Lee Roth ===
- A Little Ain't Enough (1991)

=== With Joe Satriani ===
- The Extremist (1993)
- Strange Beautiful Music (2002)
- Is There Love in Space? (2004)
- G3: Live in Tokyo (2005)
- Professor Satchafunkilus and the Musterion of Rock (2008)

=== With Ringo Starr ===
- Ringo Starr: Live at Soundstage (2007) Koch Entertainment
- Give More Love (2017)

=== With Rick Springfield ===
- Venus in Overdrive (2008)
- Songs for the End of the World (2012)
- Rocket Science (2016)
- The Red Locusts (2021)
- The Locustz: Buzzkill (2026)

=== With Robbie Angelucci ===
- A Guy with an Accent (2002)

=== With Maynard Ferguson ===
- Storm (1982)
- Live from San Francisco (1985)

=== With Leon Russel ===
- Mid Summer Blossoms 2 (1991)

=== With Boz Scaggs ===
- Greatest Hits Live (2004)

=== With Globus ===
- Epicon (2006)

=== With Elton John ===
- Wonderful Crazy Night (2016)

=== Other solo projects ===
- Spot (1998)
- Spot 2 (2000)
- Raising Lazarus (2004)
- Oh No! Bass Solo! (2004)
- Life of the Party (2009)
- Disposable Planet (2011)
- “Common Road” (2025)
- “Straight To The Truth” (2026)
