= What Kind of Fool Am I (Rick Springfield song) =

Single by Rick Springfield

from the album Success Hasn't Spoiled Me Yet
- B-side: "How Do You Talk to Girls"
- Released: May 1982
- Genre: Power pop
- Length: 3:20
- Label: RCA Victor
- Songwriter: Rick Springfield
- Producer: Keith Olsen

Rick Springfield singles chronology
"Don't Talk to Strangers" (1982)	"What Kind of Fool Am I" (1982)	"I Get Excited" (1982)

"What Kind of Fool Am I" is a song written by Rick Springfield and released on his 1982 album Success Hasn't Spoiled Me Yet. It was also released as the 2nd single from the album, following up on "Don't Talk to Strangers", which reached #2 on the Billboard Hot 100. "What Kind of Fool Am I" did not repeat the success of its predecessor, peaking at #21.

According to Springfield, the lyrics of "What Kind of Fool Am I" are about his then-girlfriend Barbara Porter, who he married in 1984. Billboard described the song as starting "as a ballad but kicks in soon enough to the punchy power pop" that had generated previous hits for Springfield. But Billboard also said that the song is not "as cohesive and irresistable" as "Don't Talk to Strangers". Cash Box similarly said that "Following an MOR-ish intro that begins to sound suspiciously like a bit from Gordon Lightfoot’s 'If You Could Read My Mind,' Springfield cracks into his by now familiar hook-laden pop/rock." Cash Box characterized the song as "adult power pop". Music journalist John Borack described the song as "superb" and "regret-tinged".

Released as a single, "What Kind of Fool Am I" reached #21 on the Billboard Hot 100 in the US. It reached that spot on July 3, 1982, and remained there for six consecutive weeks. The single also reached #41 in Canada.

"What Kind of Fool Am I" was later released on several of Rick Springfield's compilation albums, including Greatest Hits in 1989, We Are the '80s in 2006 and The Essential Rick Springfield in 2011.
