= Rock of Life =

Studio album by Rick Springfield
- Released: February 1988
- Studios: Compass Point Studios (Nassau, Bahamas); Goodnight L.A. Studio (Los Angeles, California); POD Studios (Malibu, California)
- Genres: Pop rock, power pop
- Length: 45:53
- Label: RCA Victor
- Producers: Keith Olsen, Rick Springfield

Rick Springfield chronology
Tao (1985)	Rock of Life (1988)	Karma (1999)

Rick Springfield chronology
Tao (1985)	Rock of Life (1988)	Greatest Hits (1989)

Professional ratings
Review scores
Source	Rating
Allmusic	2/5 stars

Rock of Life is the 11th studio album by Australian singer-songwriter Rick Springfield, issued by RCA Records in 1988. The record peaked at a modest No. 55 on the Billboard album chart, selling approximately 350,000 copies in United States. It was the least successful of Springfield's RCA album releases and his last on the label.

The title track, however, was a successful single, reaching No. 22 on the Billboard Hot 100. A second single, "Honeymoon in Beirut" was Springfield's only single not to chart in Billboard's Hot 100 during his eight years on the label. Both singles were the only songs on the album to receive music video treatment. Although not a commercial success, Rock of Life did garner some positive reviews from critics. People reviewer Ralph Novak pointed out that "even [Springfield's] standard romantic tunes get away from romantic cliches."

== Background ==
The album was released 3 years after 1985's Tao, which also featured more dark and introspective lyrics than Springfield's previous releases prior to that album. This hiatus was due to Springfield taking time off to focus on his growing family. He has also stated that he suffered from major writer's block in this period, as well as mental/emotional health struggles. The album's notoriously dark lyrics reflect Springfield's emotional struggles during this time. Randy Jackson of Journey plays bass guitar on the album. Springfield's longtime guitarist, Tim Pierce, also appears, as does frequent collaborator, Richard Page of Mr. Mister.

Plans to tour behind Rock of Life, which would have been a comeback tour of sorts, were cut short after Springfield badly injured himself in a near-fatal motorcycle accident. Not able to tour and still suffering from writer's block, Springfield took a break from his music career to spend more time with his wife and children, as well as to focus on his acting career. He would not release another solo album for 11 years, though he did release a group album in 1997 with Sahara Snow.

Cash Box called the title track a "ballsy, reggae-like track that nearly tears apart the speakers" with influences from Sting and Peter Gabriel.

The album features a cover of "(If You Think You're) Groovy," by P.P. Arnold and Small Faces. Springfield's oldest son, Liam Springthorpe, is audible in the last seconds of the track. "World Start Turning," is specifically about Springfield's battle with depression. The song was re-recorded with a live orchestra for Springfield's 2019 release, Orchestrating My Life. A live version of "Rock of Life," appears on the 2001 live compilation album, The Greatest Hits... Alive.

== Track listing ==
All songs written by Rick Springfield, except where noted.

1. "Rock of Life" – 3:52
2. "Honeymoon in Beirut" – 4:28
3. "World Start Turning" – 5:41
4. "One Reason (To Believe)" – 4:05
5. "Soul to Soul" – 4:46
6. "Tear It All Down" – 4:17
7. "Woman" – 5:53
8. "Dream in Colour" (Springfield, Jeff Silverman) – 4:32
9. "Hold On to Your Dream" – 4:38
10. "(If You Think You're) Groovy" (Steve Marriott, Ronnie Lane) – 4:00

Total length: 45:53

"The Language of Love" was the B-side to "Rock of Life," but was not featured on the album's official release.

== Charts ==
Chart (1988)	Peak position
Canada (Canadian Albums Chart)	65
United States (Billboard 200)	55

== Personnel ==
Music Performance

- Rick Springfield – vocals, guitar, keyboards, sampler, percussion, backing vocals, vocal arrangements, horn arrangements
- Randy Jackson – bass
- Alan Pasqua, Bill Cuomo, Kimo Cornwell – keyboards
- Tim Pierce, Dann Huff – guitar
- Curt Cress – drums, percussion
- Carol Steele – percussion
- Tommy Funderburk, Fred White, Jean Johnson McRath, Maxi Anderson – backing vocals
- Rose Banks – backing vocals and solo female vocals
- Richard Page – additional backing vocals
- William Frank "Bill" Reichenbach Jr. – trombone
- Gary Grant, Jerry Hey – trumpet
- Gary Herbig, Larry Williams – saxophone and horn arrangements
- Jeff Silverman – additional vocal arrangements

Production; Creative; Other

- Keith Olsen – primary producer
- Rick Springfield – production
- Greg Fulgitini – mastering
- Jon Astley – remastering
- Phillip Dixon – photography
- Curt Evans, Larry Vigon – design and art direction
- Derek Oliver, Malcolm Dome – liner notes
- Julia Melanie Goode – creative director
- Jon Richards – product manager
- Roy Sweeting – assistant

== See also ==
- Rick Springfield discography
