= Hard to Hold =

Soundtrack album by Rick Springfield
- Released: March 1984
- Genres: Rock, power pop
- Length: 35:29
- Label: RCA Victor
- Producers: Rick Springfield, Bill Drescher, Graham Parker, Harvey Goldberg, Tom Scott, Peter Gabriel, Peter Walsh

Rick Springfield chronology
Living in Oz (1983)	Hard to Hold (1984)	Beautiful Feelings (1984)

Singles from Hard to Hold
- 1. "Love Somebody" Released: February 1984; 2. "Don't Walk Away" Released: May 1984; 3. "Bop 'Til You Drop" Released: August 1984; 4. "Taxi Dancing" Released: August 1984

Hard to Hold is the eighth studio album by Rick Springfield released in March 1984, by RCA Records as the soundtrack to the film of the same name. The album includes the U.S. Top 5 hit "Love Somebody", Top 40 hits "Don't Walk Away" and "Bop 'Til You Drop", plus minor hit "Taxi Dancing" (a duet with Randy Crawford). In addition to Springfield appearing on the soundtrack, there are three tracks from other artists: "When The Lights Go Down" by Graham Parker, "Heart of a Woman" by Nona Hendryx, and a live version of "I Go Swimming" by Peter Gabriel. The album was later remastered by Steve Hoffman for the Razor and Tie reissue label.

== Reception ==
From contemporary reviews, Ken Tucker of The Philadelphia Inquirer gave the album three out of five star rating, noting that "Love Somebody" was Springfrield's "best pop-rocker since "Jessie's Girl" and the filler songs on the album include good songs by Graham Parker and Peter Gabriel. Tucker concluded that the album was "one of the few soundtrack albums that doesn't cheat its listeners."

Cash Box said that the second single "Don't Walk Away" has "a more heavy metal tinge...than on 'Love Somebody' and Springfield’s hard rock sensibilities come into full flower with a high-energy sound that gives this tune a forceful momentum."

Cash Box called the third single "Bob 'Til You Drop" "an urban mover for the ’80s."

== Track listing ==
No.	Title	Writer(s)	Artist	Length
1.	"Love Somebody"	Rick Springfield	Rick Springfield	3:30
2.	"Don't Walk Away"	Rick Springfield	Rick Springfield	4:00
3.	"Bop 'Til You Drop"	Rick Springfield	Rick Springfield	4:16
4.	"Taxi Dancing" (duet with Randy Crawford)	Rick Springfield	Rick Springfield	3:30
5.	"S.F.O." (Instrumental)	Rick Springfield, Tim Pierce	Rick Springfield	2:21
6.	"Stand Up"	Rick Springfield	Rick Springfield	3:06
7.	"When the Lights Go Down"	Graham Parker	Graham Parker	3:21
8.	"Great Lost Art of Conversation"	Rick Springfield	Rick Springfield	3:07
9.	"Heart of a Woman"	Tom Scott, Candy Parton	Nona Hendryx	3:42
10.	"I Go Swimming" (Live)	Peter Gabriel	Peter Gabriel	4:36
Total length:				35:29

== Personnel ==
- Producers: Rick Springfield & Bill Drescher
- Engineer: Bill Drescher
- Second Engineers: Eddie Delena, Rick Polakow
- Executive Producer: D. Constantine Conte
- Mastered by Greg Fulginiti at Artisan Sound Recorders, Hollywood
- CD Mastered by Steve Hoffman
- Recorded by [Pre-production Assistance]: Jeff Silverman
- Brett Tuggle, Richard Page, Rick Springfield, Jerry Marotta [PG], Tom Kelly – backing vocals
- Mike Seifrit, Reggie McBride, Tony Levin [PG] – bass
- Peter Gabriel [PG] – vocals
- Mike Baird – drums
- Jeff Silverman, Rick Springfield, David Rhodes [PG], Tim Pierce – guitar
- Alan Pasqua, John Philip Shenale, Mitchell Froom, Larry Fast [PG], Rick Springfield – keyboards
- Michael Fisher – acoustic percussion
- Reek Havoc, Rick Springfield – electronic percussion
- Joel Peskin – saxophone, electric woodwind

[PG] Peter Gabriel track (I Go Swimming)

== Charts ==
Chart (1984)	Peak position
Australia (Kent Music Report)	87
Canada Top Albums/CDs (RPM)	29
German Albums (Offizielle Top 100)	24
Norwegian Albums (VG-lista)	14
Swedish Albums (Sverigetopplistan)	5
US Billboard 200	16

== Certifications ==
Certifications for Hard to Hold
Region	Certification	Certified units/sales
Canada (Music Canada)	Gold	50,000^{^}
United States (RIAA)	Platinum	1,000,000^{^}
^{^} Shipments figures based on certification alone.
