= Mike Baird (musician) =

American drummer

- Genres: Rock; pop
- Occupation: Drummer
- Instrument: Drums

Michael Baird is an American drummer. He has played drums for Airborne, Vasco Rossi, Billy Idol, Hall and Oates, Pointer Sisters, Donna Summer, Riverdogs, Animotion, Richard Marx, Wang Chung, Michael Bolton, Rick Springfield, Eddie Money, Kenny Loggins, Yumi Matsutoya, Juice Newton, and Prism. He was a touring drummer for Journey on their tour for the Raised on Radio album.

== Partial discography ==
With Hall & Oates

- Daryl Hall & John Oates (1975)

With Jamie Owens

- Growing Pains (1975)

With Paul Anka

- Headlines (1979)
- Walk a Fine Line (1983)

With Bob Dylan

- Down in the Groove (1988)

With Rodney Crowell

- Street Language (1986)

With Airborne

- Airborne (1979)

With George Benson

- Twice the Love (1988)

With Juice Newton

- Can't Wait All Night (1984)
- Ain't Gonna Cry (1989)

With Peabo Bryson

- Peace on Earth (1997)

With Natalie Cole

- Everlasting (1987)

With Sheena Easton

- Best Kept Secret (1983)
- My Cherie (1995)

With Airplay

- Airplay (1980)

With Barbra Streisand

- Back to Broadway (1993)

With Livingston Taylor

- Three Way Mirror (1978)

With Michael Bolton

- The Hunger (1987)

With Nigel Olsson

- Nigel Olsson (1978)
- Nigel (1979)

With Toni Basil

- Word of Mouth (1982)
- Toni Basil (1983)

With Art Garfunkel

- Fate for Breakfast (1979)

With Kenny Loggins

- Back to Avalon (1988)
- Leap of Faith (1991)

With Dionne Warwick

- Friends in Love (1982)

With Al Jarreau

- High Crime (1984)

With Irene Cara

- What a Feelin' (1983)

With Bette Midler

- Bette of Roses (1995)

With Syreeta Wright

- Syreeta (1980)

With Yvonne Elliman

- Night Flight (1978)

With Neil Diamond

- Heartlight (1982)

With America

- Alibi (1980)

With Cherie & Marie Currie

- Messin' with the Boys (1980)
- Messin' with the Boys (re-released, 1997)
- Young and Wild (1998)

With Donna Summer

- She Works Hard for the Money (1983)
- Cats Without Claws (1984)

With Randy Crawford

- Now We May Begin (1980)

With Rick Springfield

- Success Hasn't Spoiled Me Yet (1982)
- Living in Oz (1983)
- Hard to Hold (Soundtrack) (1984)
- Tao (1985)
- Karma (1999)

With Cher

- Prisoner (1979)

With Van Stephenson

- Righteous Anger (1984)
- Suspicious Heart (1986)

With Céline Dion

- Let's Talk About Love (1997)

With Eddie Money

- Can't Hold Back (1986)
- Nothing to Lose (1988)
- Right Here (1991)

With Riverdogs

- Riverdogs (1988)

With Rita Coolidge

- Anytime...Anywhere (1977)
- Love Me Again (1978)

With Richard Marx

- Repeat Offender (1989)
- Rush Street (1991)

With Billy Idol

- Charmed Life (1990)

With Richie Havens

- The End Of The Beginning (1976)

With Joe Cocker

- Cocker (1986)
- Night Calls (1991)

With Kenny Rogers

- We've Got Tonight (1983)
- They Don't Make Them Like They Used To (1986)

With i-Ten

- Taking a Cold Look (1983)

With Yumi Matsutoya

- The 14th Moon (1976)
- DA･DI･DA (1985)
- Tears and Reasons (1992)
- U-miz (1993)
- WAVE OF THE ZUVUYA (1997)
- Wings of winter, Shades of summer (2002)

With Shogo Hamada

- Home Bound (1980)

With Prism

- Beat Street (1983)
