= Shock/Denial/Anger/Acceptance =

shock/denial/anger/acceptance

Studio album by Rick Springfield
- Released: 24 February 2004
- Genre: Rock
- Length: 48:34
- Label: Gomer Records
- Producer: Rick Springfield

Rick Springfield chronology
Karma (1999)	shock/denial/anger/acceptance (2004)	The Day After Yesterday (2005)

Professional ratings
Review scores
Source	Rating
Allmusic	3/5 stars
Melodic Rock	93%

shock/denial/anger/acceptance is the 13th studio album by Rick Springfield. Released on 24 February 2004, it also includes a limited edition package, which contains a CD of unreleased music and demos from previous albums and a DVD of interviews and videos.

== Track listing ==
All tracks are written by Rick Springfield except as noted

No.	Title	Writer(s)	Length
1.	"Perfect"		2:57
2.	"I'll Make You Happy"	Stevie Wright, George Young	3:41
3.	"Will I?"		3:18
4.	"God Gave You to Everyone"		2:36
5.	"Idontwantanythingfromyou"		3:18
6.	"Jesus Saves"		3:17
7.	"Beautiful You"		2:57
8.	"Wasted"		3:01
9.	"Shoot Your Guru"		0:55
10.	"Alien Virus"		2:28
11.	"Angels of the Disappeared"		3:16
12.	"Eden"		3:27
13.	"The Invisible Girl"		2:53
14.	"My Depression"		3:01
15.	"Your Psychopathic Mother"		2:49
16.	"Every Night I Wake Up Screaming"		3:24
17.	"Open My Eyes"		1:16

Limited Edition (CD/DVD)
No.	Title	Length
1.	"Forever" (Recorded during the s/d/a/a sessions)
2.	"Love Screws Me Up" (Unreleased track from the Karma album sessions)
3.	"Revolution Day" (Unreleased track from the Karma album sessions)
4.	"Rhythm of Love" (Unreleased song recorded in 1988)
5.	"Her Body Makes Vows" (Unreleased track from the Karma album sessions)
6.	"Faithful" (Alternate version than used in EFX Alive!)
7.	"When You Dream" (Song from EFX Alive! show in Las Vegas 2001-2003)
8.	"Rhythm of the Beat" (Original version with extra verses)
9.	"Forever" (EFX Alive! version)
10.	"Rock of Life" (Home demo recorded in 1986)
11.	"Affair of the Heart" (Home demo recorded in 1982)
12.	"Souls" (Home demo recorded in 1982)
13.	"Don’t Talk to Strangers" (Home demo recorded in 1981)
14.	"Poison Pen" (Unreleased demo from the Success Hasn't Spoiled Me Yet sessions)
15.	"American Girls" (Recorded live in Los Angeles in 1974)
16.	"Fire Brigade" (Unreleased song recorded in 1974)
17.	"Sweet Teaser" (Unreleased song recorded in 1974)
18.	"Will I?" (AC Radio Mix – alternate version)

== Personnel ==
- Rick Springfield – lead vocals, guitars
- John Billings – bass
- David Whiston – guitars
- Derek Hilland – keyboards
- Rodger Carter – drums

== Charts ==
Year	Chart	Position
2004	Billboard Independent Albums	8
