= The Snake King =

Studio album by Rick Springfield
- Released: January 26, 2018
- Studio: East–West, Hollywood, California, United States; The Black Lagoon, Malibu, California, United States
- Genre: Blues rock
- Length: 53:29
- Language: English
- Label: Frontiers
- Producer: Rick Springfield

Rick Springfield chronology
Rocket Science (2016)	The Snake King (2018)	Orchestrating My Life (2021)

It’s something I’ve been thinking about for a long time, and I wrote actually over a weekend, got the basic form for a lot of the songs and what they’d be about. It happened pretty quick and then I just fiddled with them over the months after that. But it came pretty fast.

—Rick Springfield on writing and recording The Snake King

The Snake King is the twentieth studio album by Australian rock musician Rick Springfield. This is the first blues album by Springfield who grew up playing this music in Australia.

== Reception ==
Editors at AllMusic rated this album 3.5 out of 5 stars, with critic Stephen Thomas Erlewine writing that this album lyrically continues the serious themes that Springfield has previously explored while working in new genres of blues and folk. Writing for Louder Sound, Phoebe Flys called the lyrics on The Snake King "a mixed bag, flitting between tongue-in-cheek and extremely poignant" and praises his guitar playing.

== Track listing ==
All songs written by Rick Springfield.

1. "In the Land of the Blind" – 4:51
2. "The Devil That You Know" – 3:02
3. "Little Demon" – 5:21
4. "Judas Tree" – 3:21
5. "Jesus Was an Atheist" – 3:14
6. "The Snake King" – 3:46
7. "God Don’t Care" – 4:59
8. "The Voodoo House" – 4:45
9. "Suicide Manifesto" – 2:18
10. "Blues for the Disillusioned" – 5:40
11. "Santa Is an Anagram" – 2:05
12. "Orpheus in the Underworld" – 10:07

== Personnel ==
- Rick Springfield – acoustic guitar on "In the Land of the Blind", "The Devil That You Know", "Little Demon", "Judas Tree", "Jesus Was an Atheist", "The Snake King", "God Don’t Care", "The Voodoo House", "Suicide Manifesto", "Blues for the Disillusioned", "Santa Is an Anagram", and "Orpheus in the Underworld"; six-string electric slide guitar on "In the Land of the Blind", "The Devil That You Know", "Judas Tree", "Jesus Was an Atheist", "The Snake King", "God Don’t Care", "The Voodoo House", "Blues for the Disillusioned", "Santa Is an Anagram", "Orpheus in the Underworld"; 12-string electric guitar on "In the Land of the Blind"; vocals on "In the Land of the Blind", "The Devil That You Know", "Little Demon", "Judas Tree", "Jesus Was an Atheist", "The Snake King", "God Don’t Care", "The Voodoo House", "Suicide Manifesto", "Blues for the Disillusioned", "Santa Is an Anagram", "Orpheus in the Underworld"; dobro slide guitar on "In the Land of the Blind", "Jesus Was an Atheist", and "God Don't Care"; resonator slide guitar on "Jesus Was an Atheist"; synth organ on "Little Demon"; synth on "The Snake King"; electric slide solo on "The Voodoo House"; steel resonator slide guitar on "Orpheus in the Underworld"; harmonica on "Orpheus in the Underworld"; string arrangements, production
- Marina Chavez – photography
- Amanda CHiles – taunting child on "Little Demon"
- Jim Cox – Hammond B3 on "In the Land of the Blind", "The Devil That You Know", "Little Demon", "Judas Tree", "Jesus Was an Atheist", "The Snake King", "God Don’t Care", "Suicide Manifesto", "Blues for the Disillusioned", "Santa Is an Anagram", and "Orpheus in the Underworld"; electric piano on "In the Land of the Blind", "The Devil That You Know", and "Judas Tree"; Wurlitzer on "The Snake King", and "God Don’t Care"
- Kym DeGenero of Sauci Creative – art direction
- Brendan Dekora – engineering at East–West
- George Doering – bouzouki on "In the Land of the Blind", "The Devil That You Know", "Little Demon", "The Snake King", "God Don’t Care", "Suicide Manifesto", "Blues for the Disillusioned", "Santa Is an Anagram", and "Orpheus in the Underworld"; mandolin on "In the Land of the Blind", "The Voodoo House", "Blues for the Disillusioned", "Santa Is an Anagram", and "Orpheus in the Underworld"; banjo on "Jesus Was an Atheist", "The Voodoo House", "Blues for the Disillusioned", "Santa Is an Anagram", and "Orpheus in the Underworld"
- Hiro Goto – violin on "Little Demon" and "Santa Is an Anagram", and "Orpheus in the Underworld; viola on "Santa Is an Anagram" and "Orpheus in the Underworld"
- Gene "The Machine" Grimaldi – mastering
- Tim Gross – synth horns on "The Devil That You Know", "Little Demon", "Judas Tree", "Jesus Was an Atheist", and "Suicide Manifesto"; string pad on "Little Demon"; solo synth on "Little Demon"
- Warren Huart – mixing at Spitfire Studio, California, United States
- Mark Lennon – backing vocals on "In the Land of the Blind", "The Devil That You Know", "Little Demon", "Jesus Was an Atheist", "The Snake King", "God Don’t Care", "The Voodoo House", "Suicide Manifesto", "Blues for the Disillusioned", "Santa Is an Anagram", and "Orpheus in the Underworld"
- Lance Morrison – bass guitar on "The Voodoo House" and "Orpheus in the Underworld"
- George Mastos – guitar
- Jorge Palacios – drums on "In the Land of the Blind", "The Devil That You Know", "Little Demon", "Judas Tree", "Jesus Was an Atheist", "The Snake King", "God Don’t Care", "Suicide Manifesto", "Blues for the Disillusioned", "Santa Is an Anagram", and "Orpheus in the Underworld"; drum loops on "The Voodoo House"
- Tim Pierce – electric rhythm guitar on "In the Land of the Blind", and "The Devil That You Know"; electric slide guitar on "In the Land of the Blind", "The Devil That You Know", "Blues for the Disillusioned", and "Santa Is an Anagram"; electric guitar on "Little Demon", "Judas Tree", "Jesus Was an Atheist", "The Snake King", "God Don’t Care", "The Voodoo House", "Suicide Manifesto", "Blues for the Disillusioned", "Santa Is an Anagram", and "Orpheus in the Underworld"; verse solos on "Judas Tree"; solos on "Jesus Was an Atheist" and "Suicide Manifesto"; baritone guitar on "The Voodoo House"
- Jeff Silverman – electric guitar solo on "The Snake King", digital editing at Palette Music Productions, Nashville, Tennessee, United States
- Siggy Sjurson – bass guitar on "In the Land of the Blind", "The Devil That You Know", "Little Demon", "Judas Tree", "Jesus Was an Atheist", "The Snake King", "God Don’t Care", "Suicide Manifesto", "Blues for the Disillusioned", and "Santa Is an Anagram"
- Matty Spindell – horn arrangements, recording
- Windy Wagner – backing vocals on "In the Land of the Blind", "The Devil That You Know", "Little Demon", "Jesus Was an Atheist", "The Snake King", "God Don’t Care", "The Voodoo House", "Suicide Manifesto", "Blues for the Disillusioned", "Santa Is an Anagram", and "Orpheus in the Underworld"
- Jimmy Z – harmonica on "The Devil That You Know", "Judas Tree", and "Suicide Manifesto"

== See also ==
- List of 2018 albums
