= Bruce (song) =

Single by Rick Springfield

from the album Beautiful Feelings
- B-side: "Guenevere"
- Released: 1980/1984
- Recorded: 1978
- Genre: Pop rock
- Length: 3:33
- Label: Mercury
- Songwriter: Rick Springfield

Rick Springfield singles chronology
| "Taxi Dancing" (1984) | "Bruce" (1980) | "Celebrate Youth" (1985) |

"Bruce" is a song by Australian musician Rick Springfield. The song appeared on his 1984 album, Beautiful Feelings. The song reached No. 27 on the U.S. Billboard Hot 100.

== Background ==
Originally recorded in 1978, relatively early in Springfield's career, the song's first-person lyrics offer a comedic take on being frequently confused with the more famous fellow musician Bruce Springsteen. One verse recounts a romantic tryst with a woman who refers to Springfield as "Bruce" during sex, another describes an encounter with a fan who expresses an affinity for Born to Run, and the final verse sees Springfield being mistakenly called Bruce even by his own mother.

Cash Box called it "a hard rocking and humorous lament over being mistaken for Bruce Springsteen."

== Chart performance ==
| Chart (1984) | Peak position |
|---|---|
| U.S. Billboard Hot 100 | 27 |
