= Beautiful Feelings =

Studio album by Rick Springfield
- Released: 1984
- Recorded: 1978
- Studios: Sound City Studios, Van Nuys, California
- Genre: Pop rock
- Length: 31:16
- Label: Mercury
- Producers: Tom Perry, Joey D. Vieira

Rick Springfield chronology
Hard to Hold (1984)	Beautiful Feelings (1984)	Tao (1985)

Singles from Beautiful Feelings
- 1. "Bruce" Released: November 1984

Professional ratings
Review scores
Source	Rating
AllMusic	2/5 stars

Beautiful Feelings is the ninth studio album (originally to be the fifth) by Australian musician Rick Springfield. It was recorded in 1978. In 1984, at the height of Springfield's popularity, Mercury Records released the album with the musical portions re-recorded and without Springfield's involvement. The one track on the album to obtain some recognition was "Bruce", which was previously released and failed to chart in 1980, but charted and peaked at number 27 on the Billboard Hot 100 in 1984. The album reached number 78 on the Billboard Pop Albums chart.

The cover illustration was created by artist Brian Zick.

The original recordings were released in 2007 on the album The Early Sound City Sessions.

== Track listing ==
All tracks composed by Rick Springfield; except where indicated

1. "Bruce" – 3:33
2. "Just One Look" (Doris Payne, Gregory Carroll) – 2:25
3. "The Solitary One" – 3:26
4. "Spanish Eyes" – 3:37
5. "Everybody's Cheating" (Pat Blerk, Trevor Rabin) – 2:52
6. "Looking for the One" – 2:38
7. "Cold Feet" – 3:35
8. "Brand New Feeling" – 2:50
9. "Beautiful Feelings" – 2:50
10. "Guenevere" – 3:07

== Charts ==
Chart (1984)	Peak position
United States (Billboard 200)	78

== Personnel ==
- Rick Springfield – vocals, guitar
- Dave Siebels – keyboards
- Ronnie "Rocket" Ritchotte – guitar
- Dave Crigger – drums
- Michael Pecanic – bass
- Larry Muhoberac – string arrangement on "Guenevere"
