= Beginnings (Rick Springfield album) =

Studio album by Rick Springfield
- Released: 28 August 1972
- Recorded: February 1972
- Studio: Trident Studios, London
- Genre: Pop rock
- Length: 36:26
- Label: Sparmac, Capitol (US)
- Producer: Robie Porter

Rick Springfield chronology
Just Zoot (1970)	Beginnings (1972)	Comic Book Heroes (1973)

Professional ratings
Review scores
Source	Rating
Christgau's Record Guide	C+

Beginnings is the debut studio album by Australian musician Rick Springfield. The album was released on 28 August 1972, by Sparmac Records. This album was issued in the U.S. on Capitol Records (SMAS-11047).

== Critical reception ==
Reviewing in Christgau's Record Guide: Rock Albums of the Seventies (1981), Robert Christgau wrote: "Would you believe second-generation Emitt Rhodes? Well, this is an exemplary singles album—gimmicky, banal, full of filler, and filled out with a few more catchy little numbers to go with "Speak to the Sky". Recommended follow-ups: 'Hooky Jo' to keep on rock-rock-rocking, 'If I Didn't Mean to Love You' for a future in Vegas balladeering."

== Track listing ==
All tracks composed by Rick Springfield

No.	Title	Length
1.	"Mother Can You Carry Me"	4:31
2.	"Speak to the Sky"	2:42
3.	"What Would the Children Think"	3:44
4.	"1000 Years"	3:54
5.	"The Unhappy Ending"	3:30
6.	"Hooky Jo"	2:48
7.	"I Didn't Mean to Love You"	3:40
8.	"Come on Everybody"	3:43
9.	"Why?"	3:59
10.	"The Ballad of Annie Goodbody"	3:55

== Charts ==
Chart (1972)	Peak position
Australia (Kent Music Report)	15
United States (Billboard 200)	35

== Personnel ==
- Rick Springfield - vocals, guitar, banjo, organ, harpsichord, piano
- Del Newman - arrangements

Technical

- Robin Geoffrey Cable - engineer
- John Hoernle - art direction
- Bob Willoughby - photography
