= The Red Locusts =

American supergroup

- Origin: Los Angeles, California, U.S.
- Genres: Pop rock
- Years active: 2020–present
- Label: Lolipop Records
- Members: Rick Springfield; Matt Bissonette; Gregg Bissonette
- Website: theredlocusts.com

The Red Locusts is an American supergroup consisting of singer-guitarist Rick Springfield, bassist Matt Bissonette, drummer Greg Bissonette and two others on guitar and keyboards whose identify are uncertain as the band members use pseudonyms. The band released an eponymous album, The Red Locusts, in March 2021. The album is a tribute to the Beatles and power pop bands of the 1980s and 1990s.

== Band members ==
There has been secrecy around the identity of the band members, with the album cover using pseudonyms, similar to the Traveling Wilburys:

- Paul Ramone (guitar, vocals), identified as Rick Springfield. The name Paul Ramone is a nod to Paul Ramon, an early pseudonym of Paul McCartney.
- Scotty Skuffleton (bass, vocals), identified as Matt Bissonette
- Skippy Skuffleton (drums, vocals), identified as Gregg Bissonette, Matt's brother
- Duncan Sweets (keyboards, vocals)
- Beau Weevil (guitar, vocals)

== Album ==
In regard to the album, The Red Locusts, Springfield said "we wanted to do an album that was influenced but would send us to Beatle jail basically".

The song "Miss Daisy Hawkins" is based on the original working title of "Eleanor Rigby". It includes many allusions to Beatles songs, and notes how Hawkins was "lost to a whim way back in '66".

=== Track listing ===
1. "Under the Rainbow"
2. "Another Bad Day for Cupid"
3. "Sons and Daughters"
4. "Miss Daisy Hawkins"
5. "Honestly"
6. "Glow Worm"
7. "Insert Your Name Here"
8. "Vanity Skies"
9. "Deep Blue Sea"
10. "Love Is Going To Save The Day"
