= Wait for Night =

Studio album by Rick Springfield
- Released: 1976
- Studios: Sound City Studios, Van Nuys, California
- Genres: Pop rock, power pop
- Length: 31:42
- Label: Chelsea Records
- Producer: Mark K. Smith

Rick Springfield chronology
Mission: Magic! (1974)	Wait for Night (1976)	Working Class Dog (1981)

Singles from Wait for Night
- 1. "Take A Hand" Released: August 1976; 2. "Million Dollar Face" Released: October 1976; 3. "Jessica" Released: December 1976; 4. "Treat Me Gently in the Morning" Released: 29 April 1977; 5. "Archangel" Released: November 1979

Professional ratings
Review scores
Source	Rating
Allmusic	3.5/5 stars

Wait for Night is the fourth studio album by Australian singer-songwriter Rick Springfield, originally released by Chelsea Records in 1976. The album was reissued by RCA Records in 1982 (with an enclosed poster from his 1982 "Sweat For Success" tour and an alternate cover that added a handwritten note from Rick and colored paint strokes on the original cover's B&W photo), and that version managed to crack into the Billboard album charts. The album was reissued on CD in 2010 by Wounded Bird Records.

Stylistically, the album represented a move away from Springfield's 1970s light rock sound to the trademark arena-ready power pop/pop rock sound that Springfield would later find success with throughout the 1980s. It received a mostly favorable retrospective review from Stephen Thomas Erlewine of AllMusic.

Springfield played most instruments on the album other than drums, performed by Nigel Olsson. The album's opener "Take a Hand" would later be included in several 'best of' albums for Springfield, and it continues to a staple of Springfield's live performances. Record World called "Take a Hand" a "really exceptional radio song," saying that "Building to a rousing chorus after the first verse, the song never lets up."

== Track listing ==
All songs written by Rick Springfield.

1. "Take a Hand" – 2:16
2. "Goldfever" – 2:58
3. "One Broken Heart" – 2:54
4. "Where's All the Love" – 3:24
5. "Archangel" – 3:03
6. "Jessica" – 3:00
7. "Million Dollar Face" – 2:50
8. "Old Gangsters Never Die" – 3:06
9. "Treat Me Gently in the Morning" – 4:35
10. "Life Is a Celebration" – 3:04

== Personnel ==
- Rick Springfield – vocals, guitar, bass, piano, front cover design concept
- Dee Murray, Joe Lamano – bass
- Nigel Olsson – drums
- Gabriel Katona, Jim Haas, Les Emmerson, Dee Murray – backing vocals
- Jimmie Haskell – strings
