= Tao (album) =

Studio album by Rick Springfield
- Released: 27 March 1985
- Genres: Pop rock; synth-pop
- Length: 41:00
- Label: RCA Victor
- Producers: Rick Springfield, Bill Drescher

Rick Springfield chronology
Beautiful Feelings (1984)	Tao (1985)	Rock of Life (1988)

Tao is the tenth studio album by Australian musician Rick Springfield. It was released on 27 March 1985, by RCA Records.

== Background ==
In the liner notes for the collector's edition CD of Tao, Springfield comments, "I was going through a major depression back then, and had been for a few years. I was spiritually lost, and finding it hard to cope with everything that was going on. Even my success was causing me pain. I couldn't come to terms with earning so much money while others were struggling to find small change even to eat. It seemed so wrong, but what could I do about it? On top of that, I had real problems dealing with my father's death. It all meant that I was in such a mess, which is why the lyrics on the Tao album are definitely the darkest of my career."

RCA and Columbia Records promoted the album with an advertisement campaign that totaled $1 million in spending. A music video for the album's first single, "Celebrate Youth", was launched on MTV on 14 April 1985. They also planned a full-length video titled The Beat Of The Drum, consisting of Springfield live in concert, music videos for "Celebrate Youth", "State Of The Heart", and "The Power of Love", plus an overview of Springfield's previous singles. Billboard announced that The Beat Of The Drum would be simulcast through Westwood One on 6 May 1985. RCA and Columbia Records also planned for it to be turned into a home video product available for retail purchase in July of that year.

The marketing push for Tao included a tie-in with 450 Bally's Aladdin's Castles arcades, which agreed to play the album at their facilities, adorn their coin machines with stickers of the album, and include it as one of their prize giveaways. RCA/Columbia further bolstered the album through promotion in print media and television advertising, along with a video press kit containing 10 minutes of concert footage and an interview with Springfield.

== Critical reception ==
Professional ratings
Review scores
Source	Rating
AllMusic	3.5/5 stars

Billboard characterised Tao as "another set of hook-laden pop-rock" from Springfield, saying that there was "no shortage of hit single candidates here." Cashbox praised the album's "use of the latest aural technology", believing that it resulted in "irresistible dance rock". They also described the lead single "Celebrate Youth" as a "slamming rocker" and an "impassioned anthem." Stereo Review believed that the album sounded "artificial and needlessly ornate" and that its songs were "all but buried under the production overkill".

== Track listing ==
All songs written by Rick Springfield, except where noted.

1. "Dance This World Away" (Tim Pierce, Springfield) – 4:36
2. "Celebrate Youth" – 4:24 (the song is 3:53 followed by a 30-second outro featuring a child's voice repeating the words "who's there")
3. "State of the Heart" (Eric McCusker, Tim Pierce, Springfield) – 4:02
4. "Written in Rock" – 4:34
5. "The Power of Love (The Tao of Love)" – 5:00
6. "Walking on the Edge" – 5:09
7. "Walk Like a Man" – 4:14
8. "The Tao of Heaven" – 1:28
9. "Stranger in the House" – 4:03
10. "My Father's Chair" – 3:27

Total length: 41:02

== Personnel ==
- Rick Springfield – vocals, guitar, Emulator II, Yamaha DX7, bass, percussion, Roland JX-3P, Oberheim DMX, backing vocals
- Mitchell Froom – Emulator II, Optigan, Yamaha DX7, Roland Jupiter-8, Memorymoog, Oberheim Xpander
- John Philip Shenale – PPG Wave, Oberheim OB-8, Yamaha DX7
- Nicky Hopkins – Yamaha DX7, Roland JX-3P
- Tim Pierce – guitar, GR707
- Jeff Silverman – GR707
- Pino Palladino – fretless bass
- Mike Baird – drums
- Mike Fischer – acoustic percussion
- Richard Page, Edie Lehmann – backing vocals and lines on "Dance This World Away"
- Tommy Funderburk, Tom Kelly, Mike Selfrit – backing vocals
- Nigel Lundemo Pierce – "talking boy"
- Produced by Rick Springfield and Bill Drescher
- Engineered by Bill Drescher
- Mastered by Greg Fulginiti at Artisan Sound, Hollywood

== Charts ==
=== Weekly charts ===
Chart (1985)	Peak position
Australia Albums (Kent Music Report)	85
Canadian Albums (RPM)	50
Dutch Albums (Album Top 100)	46
European Albums (Music & Media)	27
German Albums (Offizielle Top 100)	5
Norwegian Albums (VG-lista)	11
Swedish Albums (Sverigetopplistan)	5
Swiss Albums (Schweizer Hitparade)	7
UK Albums (Official Charts)	68
US Billboard 200	21

=== Year-end charts ===
Chart (1985)	Position
German Albums (Offizielle Top 100)	16
US Billboard 200	81

== Certifications ==
Certifications for Tao
Region	Certification	Certified units/sales
United States (RIAA)	Gold	500,000^{^}
^{^} Shipments figures based on certification alone.
