= Comic Book Heroes =

Studio album by Rick Springfield
- Released: 17 September 1973
- Recorded: 1973
- Genre: Pop rock
- Label: Wizard Records, Capitol (US), Columbia (US)
- Producer: Robie Porter

Rick Springfield chronology
Beginnings (1972)	Comic Book Heroes (1973)	Mission: Magic! (1974)

Comic Book Heroes is the second studio album by Australian musician Rick Springfield. The album was released on 17 September 1973, by Wizard Records. In the U.S. this album was first issued on Capitol Records (SMAS-11206), then quickly withdrawn (because of legal proceedings) and subsequently issued on the Columbia Records label (KC-32704).

== Reception ==
Cash Box said "This collection of eleven original compositions produced by Robie Porter ranges from the heavy rocker 'I'm Your Superman' to the polished and full Weep No More'. 'Misty Water Woman' and 'The Liar' are splendid examples of Rick's songwriting virtuosity as each reflects several contiguous textures that are rough and refined alternately. This LP is well worth getting into."

== Track listing ==
All tracks composed by Rick Springfield

No.	Title	Length
1.	"Comic Book Heroes"	0:43
2.	"I'm Your Superman"	2:59
3.	"Weep No More"	3:45
4.	"Why Are You Waiting"	3:59
5.	"Believe in Me"	3:55
6.	"Misty Water Woman"	4:37
7.	"The Liar"	3:43
8.	"The Photograph"	3:25
9.	"Bad Boy"	3:09
10.	"Born Out of Time"	3:46
11.	"Do You Love Your Children"	6:03

== Charts ==
Chart (1973)	Peak position
Australia (Kent Music Report)	54
