= Working Class Dog =

Studio album by Rick Springfield
- Released: February 1981
- Recorded: 1980–1981
- Studios: Sound City, Van Nuys, California
- Genres: Power pop; pop rock; new wave
- Length: 32:11
- Label: RCA Victor
- Producers: Rick Springfield, Bill Drescher, Keith Olsen

Rick Springfield chronology
Wait for Night (1976)	Working Class Dog (1981)	Success Hasn't Spoiled Me Yet (1982)

Singles from Working Class Dog
- 1. "Jessie's Girl" Released: February 1981; 2. "I've Done Everything for You" Released: March 1981; 3. "Love is Alright Tonite" Released: November 1981

Professional ratings
Review scores
Source	Rating
AllMusic	4.5/5 stars

Working Class Dog is the fifth studio album by Australian rock musician Rick Springfield, released by RCA Records in 1981. The album was certified Platinum in the United States and eventually sold over three million US copies. It produced Springfield's biggest career hit with the number one million-selling song, "Jessie's Girl". Springfield was awarded the 1982 Grammy Award for Best Rock Vocal Performance, Male.

The album was re-released on CD in 2006 as a "25th anniversary edition" with three bonus tracks.

== Track listing ==
All tracks written by Rick Springfield except as indicated.

Side one
No.	Title	Writer(s)	Length
1.	"Love Is Alright Tonite"		3:28
2.	"Jessie's Girl"		3:14
3.	"Hole in My Heart"		3:12
4.	"Carry Me Away"		3:01
5.	"I've Done Everything for You"	Sammy Hagar	3:17

Side two
No.	Title	Length
6.	"The Light of Love"	2:43
7.	"Everybody's Girl"	2:59
8.	"Daddy's Pearl"	2:37
9.	"Red Hot & Blue Love"	2:57
10.	"Inside Sylvia"	4:43

25th anniversary edition
No.	Title	Length
11.	"Easy to Cry" (previously unreleased)	3:33
12.	"Taxi Dancing" (original version, previously unreleased)	3:35
13.	"Jessie's Girl" (demo version)	3:11

== Album cover ==
The album cover features a picture of a Bull Terrier dog dressed in a white shirt with a black tie. The dog was Springfield’s pet named Ronnie, and he briefly cameoed in the music video for "Jessie's Girl". Ronnie would later be featured in the cover art of his owner's next album Success Hasn't Spoiled Me Yet. Working Class Dog's cover (credited to Mike Doud) was nominated for a Grammy Award for "Best Album Package" in 1981. The 2011 Jonathan Coulton song "Je Suis Rick Springfield" makes reference to the album cover. Ronnie died in 1994.

== Personnel ==
- Rick Springfield – vocals, guitar, bass, keyboards
- Robben Ford – guitar
- Neil Giraldo – guitar, bass
- Gabriel Katona – keyboards
- Jeff Eyrich – bass
- Mike Baird – drums
- Jack White – drums
- Jeremiah Cox – French horn, background vocals
- Tom Kelly – background vocals

== Credits ==
- Produced by Rick Springfield, Bill Drescher and Keith Olsen
- Engineered by Bill Drescher, Chris Minto and Doug Pakes at Sound City
- Mastered by Greg Fulginiti at Artisan Sound Recorders

== Charts ==
=== Weekly charts ===
Chart (1981)	Peak position
Australia Albums (Kent Music Report)	33
US Billboard 200	7

=== Year-end charts ===
Chart (1981)	Position
US Billboard 200	38
Chart (1982)	Position
US Billboard 200	31

== Certifications ==
Certifications for Working Class Dog
Region	Certification	Certified units/sales
Canada (Music Canada)	2× Platinum	200,000^{^}
United States (RIAA)	Platinum	1,000,000^{^}
^{^} Shipments figures based on certification alone.
