= Christmas with You (Rick Springfield album) =

Christmas With You

Studio album by Rick Springfield studio
- Released: 6 November 2007
- Genres: Rock, pop rock
- Length: 45:22
- Label: Gomer Records
- Producer: Rick Springfield

Rick Springfield studio chronology
The Day After Yesterday (2005)	Christmas With You (2007)	Venus in Overdrive (2008)

Rick Springfield chronology
The Day After Yesterday (2005)	Christmas with You (2007)	Playlist: The Very Best of Rick Springfield (2008)

Christmas With You is the 15th studio album by Australian singer-songwriter Rick Springfield, his only holiday-themed album, and his second album consisting primarily of cover songs, the first being The Day After Yesterday from 2005.

== Critical reception ==
Stephen Thomas Erlewine of AllMusic gave the overtly religious holiday album mostly positive remarks, writing "Springfield not only sticks to the classics, he gives many of these spare, baroque acoustic treatments that emphasize their folk origin." Erlewine concludes his review with: "The album could use just a little bit more...fun, but in its measured, inventive way, Christmas with You is far from the standard holiday album, and it's hard not to admire that Springfield opted for something different on his Christmas record than ...the same songs that show up on most seasonal albums by veteran artists."

== Track listing ==
No.	Title	Length
1.	"Christmas with You"	3:00
2.	"The First Noel"	3:26
3.	"Hark the Herald Angels Sing"	3:39
4.	"What Child Is This?"	2:52
5.	"God Rest Ye Merry Gentlemen"	3:21
6.	"It Came Upon a Midnight Clear"	3:12
7.	"Away in a Manger"	3:50
8.	"O Come All Ye Faithful"	3:26
9.	"Carol of the Bells"	2:33
10.	"Do You Hear What I Hear?"	3:02
11.	"I'll Be Home for Christmas"	3:01
12.	"Silent Night"	2:49
13.	"Oh Little Town of Bethlehem"	2:56
14.	"I Saw Three Ships"	1:56
15.	"Deck The Halls (With Boughs of Longboards)"	2:16

Total length: 45:22
