= The Day After Yesterday =

Studio album by Rick Springfield
- Released: 12 July 2005
- Genre: Rock, hard rock, pop rock
- Length: 1:10:40
- Label: Gomer Records
- Producer: Rick Springfield

Rick Springfield chronology
shock/denial/ anger/acceptance (2004)	The Day After Yesterday (2005)	Christmas with You (2007)

Professional ratings
Review scores
Source	Rating
Allmusic	3/5 stars

The Day After Yesterday is the 14th studio album by Australian singer-songwriter Rick Springfield, released in 2005. It spent a single week on Billboard's album chart, peaking at #197. The album is composed largely of covers of his favourite songs written by other contemporary artists.

== Track listing ==
All guitars by Rick Springfield, with John 5 for tracks 4 & 14.

No.	Title	Writer(s)	Length
1.	"I'm Not in Love"	Eric Stewart & Graham Gouldman (10cc)	6:09
2.	"Under the Milky Way"	The Church	5:43
3.	"Life in a Northern Town"	The Dream Academy	4:50
4.	"Broken Wings" (duet with Richard Page)	Mr. Mister	6:43
5.	"Human"	The Human League	5:06
6.	"Holding On to Yesterday"	Ambrosia	5:02
7.	"Baker Street"	Gerry Rafferty	6:32
8.	"Waiting for a Girl Like You"	Foreigner	5:18
9.	"Let's Go Out Tonite"	The Blue Nile	5:27
10.	"For No One"	The Beatles	2:26
11.	"Miss You Nights"	Dave Townsend	3:19
12.	"Blue Rose"	Lizz Wright	5:20
13.	"Cry"	Rick Springfield	5:24
14.	"Imagine"	John Lennon	3:14

Total length: 1:10:40
There is a Limited Edition CD/DVD set which includes two CDs.

CD 01: Same as above, with the addition of one more track:

No.	Title	Writer(s)	Length
15.	"Love Is the Answer"	Todd Rundgren

CD 02

No.	Title	Writer(s)	Length
1.	"Dreamtime"
2.	"Will I? (Acoustic)"
3.	"Beautiful U (Acoustic)"
4.	"Jessie's Girl (Reggae-Acoustic)"
5.	"Angel"
6.	"Hey Josephine"
7.	"Brothers in Arms"	Rick Springfield
8.	"Hey Eileen"
9.	"Woman/Man"
10.	"Haven't I Been Good to You?"
11.	"Monkey"
12.	"Instrumental Noodlings '92"
13.	"Little Voices"

The DVD includes Springfield's headlined performance on EFX Alive! at the MGM Grand.
