= My Precious Little One: Lullabies for a New Generation =

Studio album by Rick Springfield
- Released: May 5, 2009
- Studio: The Black Lagoon, Malibu, California, United States
- Genre: Children's music
- Length: 45:08
- Language: English
- Label: Gomer
- Producer: Rick Springfield

Rick Springfield chronology
Venus in Overdrive (2008)	My Precious Little One: Lullabies for a New Generation (2009)	Songs for the End of the World (2012)

My Precious Little One: Lullabies for a New Generation is a 2009 studio album by pop rock musician Rick Springfield, made up of children's music.

== Reception ==
Editors at AllMusic rated this album 3.5 out of 5 stars, with critic Stephen Thomas Erlewine writing that Springfield shows effort as a musician on this recording: "Springfield doesn't succumb to cutesiness, he doesn't record standards, he writes a selection of clear-eyed originals that are directed as much to the parents as they are to the kids". Brandy McDonnell of The Oklahoman stated that "in spite the whimsical lyrics and soft sounds of marimba and bells, Springfield’s lullabies actually are pop songs with interesting chord progressions and lovely melodies" and recommends that parents may enjoy the music. A review in People called it "musically monotonous", but with good lyrics.

== Track listing ==
All songs written by Rick Springfield.

1. "Don’t Keep the Sandman Waiting" – 4:02
2. "My Precious Little One" – 3:01
3. "Another Rainy Night" – 3:51
4. "Catch a Kiss" – 3:20
5. "Say Goodnight" – 4:42
6. "The Night Is a Friendly Color" – 5:47
7. "Dreamtime Faeries" – 3:28
8. "Sweet Dreams" – 4:32
9. "Sleepy Children" – 5:06
10. "Up the Wooden Hills to Bedfordshire" – 7:19

== Personnel ==
- Rick Springfield – bass, guitar, lead vocals, backing vocals, production, liner notes
- Matt Bissonette – bass, backing vocals
- Kym DeGenaro – creative direction
- Vince DiCola – guitar, keyboards, vocals
- Gene Grimaldi – mastering
- Jeff Gross – percussion
- Dino Soldo – saxophone
- Matty Spindel – engineering, mixing

== See also ==
- List of 2009 albums
