= Rocket Science (Rick Springfield album) =

Studio album by Rick Springfield
- Released: 19 February 2016
- Genre: Rock, pop rock
- Length: 45:27
- Label: Frontiers Records
- Producer: Rick Springfield, Matt Bissonette

Rick Springfield chronology
Stripped Down (2015)	Rocket Science (2016)	The Snake King (2018)

Professional ratings
Review scores
Source	Rating
AllMusic	4/5 stars

Rocket Science is the 19th studio album by rock musician Rick Springfield.

== Track listing ==
No.	Title	Length
1.	"Light This Party Up"	2:23
2.	"Down"	3:09
3.	"That One"	3:26
4.	"The Best Damn Thing"	4:23
5.	"Miss Mayhem"	3:19
6.	"Pay It Forward"	3:46
7.	"Found"	2:48
8.	"Crowded Solitude"	3:30
9.	"Let Me In"	4:02
10.	"All Hands on Deck"	3:56
11.	"We Connect"	3:38
12.	"(I Wish I Had a) Concrete Heart"	3:03
13.	"Earth to Angel"	4:04
Total length:		45:27

== Personnel ==
- Rick Springfield – lead vocals, guitar
- George Bernhardt, George Nastos, Tim Pierce – guitar
- George Doering – mandolin, acoustic guitar
- Matt Bissonette – bass, backing vocals
- Jim Cox – keyboards
- Jorge Palacios – drums, percussion
- Brandon Mgee, Chariya Bissonette, Josh Bissonette, Robbie Wyckoff, Windy Wagner – backing vocals
