= Songs for the End of the World =

Studio album by Rick Springfield
- Released: 9 October 2012
- Genre: Rock, pop rock
- Length: 40:12
- Label: Hip-O
- Producer: Rick Springfield and Matt Bissonette

Rick Springfield chronology
My Precious Little One: Lullabies for a New Generation (2009)	Songs for the End of the World (2012)	Stripped Down (2015)

Professional ratings
Review scores
Source	Rating
Allmusic	3.5/5 stars

Songs for the End of the World is the 18th studio album by rock musician Rick Springfield. The album was released in four versions, each with its own steampunk-themed cover art and unique bonus content. The album title is a reference to the Maya calendar.

== Overview ==
As described by Springfield himself, the album is "in the end, [...] a relationship album, viewed from the perspective of how the relationship is the thing that matters. Even though the world may be coming down around our ears, that's the most important thing." The idea for the album came after discussions with his writing partner Matt Bissonette. "We'd been talking a lot about all the signs and all the things that have been happening - all the wars, the melting polar ice caps, the food chain endangered, overpopulation, all the super bugs, all those kind of things." The songwriting process continued alongside the thoughts the two discussed. However, the album's dark subjects should not be taken as is. "The fact is that we're in a very precarious position now, planet-wise, and it's pretty daunting, all the stuff that's been going on," Springfield says. But "a lot of it is tongue-in-cheek. One good thing about it is it's high-energy rock 'n' roll."

== Track listing ==
All lyrics are written by Rick Springfield; all music is composed by Springfield and Matt Bissonette.

No.	Title	Length
1.	"Wide Awake"	3:02
2.	"Our Ship’s Sinking"	3:23
3.	"I Hate Myself"	2:40
4.	"You & Me"	3:52
5.	"Gabriel"	3:57
6.	"A Sign of Life"	3:13
7.	"My Last Heartbeat"	3:30
8.	"Joshua"	2:59
9.	"Love Screws Me Up"	2:53
10.	"I Found You"	3:16
11.	"Depravity"	3:34
12.	"One Way Street"	3:53
Total length:		40:12

== Personnel ==
- Rick Springfield – Lead Vocals, Guitars
- Matt Bissonette – Bass, Keyboards, Backing Vocals
- Rodger Carter – Drums, Percussion
- George Bernhardt – Guitar
