= Love Is Alright Tonite =

Single by Rick Springfield

from the album Working Class Dog
- B-side: "Everybody's Girl"
- Released: August 1981
- Genre: Pop rock
- Length: 3:28
- Label: RCA
- Songwriter(s): Rick Springfield

Rick Springfield singles chronology
"I've Done Everything for You" (1981)	"Love Is Alright Tonite" (1981)	"Don't Talk to Strangers" (1982)

"Love Is Alright Tonite" is a song performed by Australian musician Rick Springfield. The song was released as a single in 1981 from the album, Working Class Dog. In February 1982, it reached No. 20 on the U.S. Billboard Hot 100.

Billboard called it a "craftily constructed uptempo pop song filled with melodic hooks and an identifiable lyric line." Record World praised the "throbbing beat, slashing guitars and Rick's vocal determination."

== Chart history ==
Chart (1981)	Peak position
Canada RPM Top Singles	26
US Billboard Hot 100	20
US Mainstream Rock (Billboard)	40

== Song usage in other media ==
- The song appears in the 2001 film, Wet Hot American Summer.
