= Don't Talk to Strangers (Rick Springfield song) =

Single by Rick Springfield

from the album Success Hasn't Spoiled Me Yet
- B-side: "Tonight"
- Released: March 1982
- Genre: Power pop
- Length: 2:59
- Label: RCA
- Songwriter: Rick Springfield
- Producer: Keith Olsen

Rick Springfield singles chronology
"Love Is Alright Tonite" (1981)	"Don't Talk to Strangers" (1982)	"What Kind of Fool Am I" (1982)

"Don't Talk to Strangers" is a song written and performed by Australian musician Rick Springfield. It was released as a single in 1982, from the album Success Hasn't Spoiled Me Yet. The song reached number two on the U.S. Billboard Hot 100 for four weeks, making it his second biggest hit in the US after the number-one hit, "Jessie's Girl". Springfield was nominated for Grammy Award for Best Male Pop Vocal Performance with the song in 1983.

== Background ==
The music was based on an earlier Springfield song titled "Spanish Eyes", and released on the Sound City recordings from 1978. The song lyrics were changed and were written to Springfield's then-girlfriend Barbara Porter (later his wife), whom he was worried was involved with other people while they were apart. Springfield recalled, "Back then, I was scared that she was screwing around because I was doing the same thing."

== Reception ==
Billboard said that it has "irresistible hooks interspersed throughout." Record World said it has "a snappy rock beat and sharp chorus hook."

== Chart history ==
=== Weekly charts ===
Chart (1982)	Peak position
Australia (Kent Music Report)	10
Canada RPM Top Singles	3
Canada RPM Adult Contemporary	3
South Africa (Springbok)	19
US Billboard Hot 100	2
US Billboard Adult Contemporary	30
US Billboard Top Rock Tracks	11
US Cash Box Top 100	2

=== Year-end charts ===
Chart (1982–1983)	Rank
Australia (Kent Music Report)	73
Canada RPM Top Singles	33
US Billboard Hot 100	20
US Cash Box Top 100	17
