= Success Hasn't Spoiled Me Yet =

Studio album by Rick Springfield
- Released: 23 March 1982
- Recorded: 1981
- Genre: Power pop
- Length: 36:37
- Label: RCA Victor
- Producer: Keith Olsen

Rick Springfield chronology
Working Class Dog (1981)	Success Hasn't Spoiled Me Yet (1982)	Living in Oz (1983)

Singles from Success Hasn't Spoiled Me Yet
- 1. "Don't Talk to Strangers" Released: February 1982; 2. "What Kind of Fool Am I" Released: May 1982; 3. "I Get Excited" Released: August 1982

Professional ratings
Review scores
Source	Rating
AllMusic	4.5/5 stars
Rolling Stone	2/5 stars

Success Hasn't Spoiled Me Yet is the sixth studio album by Australian rock musician Rick Springfield, released by RCA Records in 1982. The album was certified platinum in the United States, and produced three top 40 singles: "Don't Talk to Strangers" (No. 2 for four weeks), "What Kind of Fool Am I" (No. 21, not the show tune of the same name) and "I Get Excited" (No. 32). "Don't Talk to Strangers" and "Calling All Girls" also received considerable album rock airplay, charting at No. 11 and No. 4 respectively.

Billboard said of the single "I Get Excited" that it "lacks the irresistible dynamics and killer hook of 'Don't Talk to Strangers'" and that it "rehashes the formulas of Springfield's past hits," such as "the guitar opening of 'Jessie's Girl.'"

As the follow-up to the breakout album Working Class Dog, the album features cover art with a return of Springfield's pet Bull Terrier dog, Ronnie, this time enjoying the fruits of success.

In an interview with Songfacts, Springfield explained that "Don't Talk to Strangers" was about his paranoia that his girlfriend was being unfaithful when he was away. The song melody is actually from the earlier recording called "Spanish Eyes", found on Rick's Sound City Recordings from 1978. "Kristina" is a remake of the Bachman–Turner Overdrive song "Jamaica", using different lyrics.

== Track listing ==
All songs written by Rick Springfield, except where noted.

1. "Calling All Girls" – 3:26
2. "I Get Excited" – 2:32
3. "What Kind of Fool Am I" – 3:19
4. "Kristina" (Springfield, Jim Vallance) – 3:01
5. "Tonight" – 3:19
6. "Black Is Black" (Tony Hayes, Michelle Grainger, Steve Wadey) – 2:52
7. "Don't Talk to Strangers" – 2:59
8. "How Do You Talk to Girls" – 3:17
9. "Still Crazy for You" (Chas Sandford) – 3:56
10. "The American Girl" – 3:09
11. "Just One Kiss" (Tom Kelly, Billy Steinberg) – 3:14
12. "April 24, 1981" – 1:33

== Production ==
- Produced by Keith Olsen
- Engineered by Chris Minto at Goodnight LA
- Assistant engineer: Kim Turner
- Mastered by Greg Fulginiti at Artisan Sound Recorders

== Personnel ==
- Rick Springfield – lead vocals, acoustic & electric guitars, backing vocals
- Tim Pierce – guitars
- Charles Sandford – guitars
- Gabriel Katona, Alan Pasqua – keyboards
- Dennis Belfield – bass
- Mike Baird – drums
- Tommy Funderburk, Tom Kelly, Richard Page – backing vocals

== Charts ==
Chart (1982)	Peak position
Australia (Kent Music Report)	28
Canada (Canadian Albums Chart)	6
United States (Billboard 200)	2

== Certifications ==
Certifications for Hasn't Spoiled Me Yet
Region	Certification	Certified units/sales
Canada (Music Canada)	Platinum	100,000^{^}
United States (RIAA)	Platinum	1,000,000^{^}
^{^} Shipments figures based on certification alone.
