= Love Somebody (Rick Springfield song) =

1984 single by Rick Springfield

Single by Rick Springfield

from the album Hard to Hold
- B-side: "The Great Lost Art of Conversation"
- Released: 1984
- Genre: Hard rock, Power pop
- Length: 3:30
- Label: RCA
- Songwriter: Rick Springfield
- Producers: Rick Springfield; Bill Drescher

Rick Springfield singles chronology
"Souls" (1983)	"Love Somebody" (1984)	"Don't Walk Away" (1984)

"Love Somebody" is a song by Rick Springfield. It was released in 1984 as the first single from his soundtrack album Hard to Hold.

Cash Box said that the song demonstrates Springfield's improvement as a songwriter since he began his pop music career.

The song was a Top 5 hit on the Billboard Hot 100.

The outro of this song is almost an exact match for the outro of Bruce Springsteen's 1975 song Born to Run.

== Chart performance ==
=== Weekly charts ===
Chart (1984)	Peak position
US Billboard Hot 100	5
US Mainstream Rock (Billboard)	13
Canada Top Singles (RPM)	13
UK Singles (Official Charts)	95
Germany (GfK)	23
Australia (KMR)	83

=== Year-end charts ===
Chart (1984)	Position
US Billboard Hot 100	62
