= I've Done Everything for You =

1978 single by Sammy Hagar

- UK 7" single cover

Single by Sammy Hagar

from the album All Night Long
- B-side: "Someone Out There"
- Released: 1978
- Recorded: 1978
- Venue: Santa Cruz Civic Auditorium
- Genre: Hard rock
- Length: 3:35
- Label: Capitol
- Songwriter: Sammy Hagar
- Producers: John Carter, Sammy Hagar

"I've Done Everything for You" is a song written and performed by Sammy Hagar, and released as a single in 1978. A version by Rick Springfield in 1981 became a top 10 hit in the US. In addition to recorded versions by Hagar and Springfield, the song has been performed and recorded by numerous bands, including Buckcherry.

"I've Done Everything for You" was a staple of Sammy Hagar's live performances as early as 1977. A live version of the song (running time: 3:35) appeared on the 1978 live album All Night Long (Loud & Clear in the United Kingdom in 1979) and was released as a single (on Capitol P4596 b/w "Someone Out There"). The single did not chart in the US, but did chart in the UK, reaching the top 40 of the UK Singles Chart at No. 36 in 1980. In 1979, a studio version was released as a B-side to the non-album single of "(Sittin' on) The Dock of the Bay" (a cover of the Otis Redding hit). This studio version was released on LP on the 1982 greatest hits album Rematch following the success of the Rick Springfield version, although Australian pressings of Hagar's 1980 album Danger Zone featured it as a bonus track closing side one.

== Rick Springfield version ==
"I've Done Everything for You"

Single by Rick Springfield

from the album Working Class Dog
- B-side: "Red Hot & Blue Love"
- Released: February 1981
- Recorded: 1980
- Genre: Rock, power pop
- Length: 3:17
- Label: RCA Victor
- Songwriter: Sammy Hagar
- Producer: Keith Olsen

Rick Springfield singles chronology
"Jessie's Girl" (1981)	"I've Done Everything for You" (1981)	"Love Is Alright Tonite" (1981)

In the early 1980s, Australian born singer Rick Springfield was signed to RCA Records and began work on what would become his international breakout album, Working Class Dog. Keith Olsen was asked to produce several tracks for the album and, after listening to Springfield's demos, he selected "Jessie's Girl". Olson also felt that Springfield should include a cover song on the album, which ended up being "I've Done Everything for You". During a 2018 interview with Eddie Trunk, Springfield stated that he was uncertain if Olsen had settled upon the song or if Neil Giraldo (guitarist and bassist for the album) had suggested it to Olsen.

The song was released as a 1981 single, backed with "Red Hot & Blue Love", as the album's lead single, though it was initially unsuccessful. After the success of the Grammy award-winning and number one single "Jessie's Girl", it was re-released, and peaked at number eight on the US Billboard Hot 100. On the US Cash Box Top 100, it peaked at number nine. Cash Box ranked it as the 71st biggest hit of 1981. The song was also a minor hit in Australia and Canada. Record World said that the song "rocks with non-stop authority" and "sports a power-pop hook and furious guitar/keyboard rip."

== See also ==
- Sammy Hagar discography: Solo singles
- Rick Springfield discography: Singles
