= Venus in Overdrive =

Studio album by Rick Springfield
- Released: 29 July 2008
- Genre: Rock
- Length: 41:33
- Label: New Door Records
- Producers: Rick Springfield and Matt Bissonette

Rick Springfield chronology
Playlist: The Very Best of Rick Springfield (2008)	Venus in Overdrive (2008)	My Precious Little One: Lullabies for a New Generation (2009)

Professional ratings
Review scores
Source	Rating
AllMusic	3.5/5 stars

Venus in Overdrive is the 16th studio album by rock musician Rick Springfield. According to an interview that Springfield gave to the website Songfacts, the title track was written about his wife, Barbara Porter, whom he married in 1984. The album spent two weeks on Billboard's album chart.

== Track listing ==
All lyrics written by Rick Springfield; all music composed by Springfield and Matt Bissonette.

No.	Title	Length
1.	"What's Victoria's Secret?"	3:15
2.	"I'll Miss That Someday"	3:20
3.	"Venus in Overdrive"	2:48
4.	"One Passenger"	4:29
5.	"Oblivious"	3:52
6.	"3 Warning Shots"	3:25
7.	"Time Stand Still"	4:16
8.	"God Blinked (Swing It Sister)"	3:31
9.	"Mr. PC"	2:41
10.	"She"	4:18
11.	"Nothing Is Ever Lost"	1:40
12.	"Saint Sahara"	3:58

Bonus Track iTunes U.S. – 13. “Pretty Little Mess“

Bonus track on German edition – 13. "Who Killed Rock 'N' Roll?"

Bonus tracks on Best Buy edition – 13. "My Generation" 14. "Jessie's Girl (Acoustic)"

== Charts ==
Chart (2008)	Peak position
US Billboard 200	28

== Personnel ==
- Rick Springfield – lead vocals, guitars
- Matt Bissonette – bass, backing vocals
- George Bernhardt – guitars
- Derek Hilland – keyboards
- Rodger Carter – drums
