= Karma (Rick Springfield album) =

Studio album by Rick Springfield
- Released: 13 April 1999
- Genre: Pop rock
- Length: 49:37
- Label: Platinum Recordings
- Producers: Rick Springfield; Bill Drescher

Rick Springfield chronology
Rock of Life (1988)	Karma (1999)	Shock/Denial/ Anger/Acceptance (2004)

Singles from Karma
- 1. "It's Always Something" Released: 1999; 2. "Karma" Released: 1999

Professional ratings
Review scores
Source	Rating
AllMusic	3/5 stars

Karma is the twelfth studio album by Australian singer-songwriter Rick Springfield. Following about a decade without a new album from Springfield, its 1999 release took place amid a resumption of touring as well.

The album peaked at No. 189 spot on the Billboard 200. "It's Always Something" peaked at No. 34 on Canada's RPM Adult Contemporary chart.

== Background and reception ==
The album followed a period of about ten years without a new album. After his last work, the 1988 LP Rock of Life, Springfield ceased with his music (releases as well as touring) to spend more time with his two boys and his wife. He released Karma during a popular resurgence of interest in 1980s society/culture (particularly among Generation X), which Springfield noticed. CNN reported that "There's relatively high interest in Springfield's return. Platinum Entertainment says advance orders for Karma have reached 100,000 copies." Karma was initially released Japan and then an American release took place a few months later. The two versions differ in respect to three songs.

Springfield made the first single, "It's Always Something", as a tribute to his father who died just before his release of Working Class Dog and breakout commercial success. He said that "My dad is a very strong figure in my life and certainly in death he's become even more meaningful" as well as that "there's still a lot of things going on in me that pertain to him and my relationship with him".

After the release of Karma, Springfield resumed his touring. The album hit the No. 189 spot on the Billboard 200, and none of its singles managed to chart.

The album represented a continuation of Springfield's same pop rock style in his 80s albums. Stephen Thomas Erlewine wrote a mostly positive review for the All Music Guide, stating that "Karma is certainly the work of a more mature artist... a thinking man's AOR". A CNN reviewer commented that the album has "a vanilla mix of 80s redolent pop tunes."

== Track listing ==
All songs written by Rick Springfield except where noted.

No.	Title	Writer(s)	Length
1.	"His Last Words"		1:32
2.	"It's Always Something"		3:33
3.	"Religion of the Heart"	Silverman, Springfield	3:34
4.	"Beautiful Prize"		3:56
5.	"Karma"		4:20
6.	"Shock to My System"	Marlette, Pierce, Springfield	4:43
7.	"Free"	Marlette, Springfield	4:33
8.	"Prayer"	Marlette, Pierce, Springfield	4:01
9.	"White Room"	Springfield, Vallance	3:22
10.	"In Veronica's Head"		3:52
11.	"Ordinary Girl"		3:47
12.	"Act of Faith"	Marlette, Pierce, Springfield	5:27
13.	"Hey Maria"		3:13

== Personnel ==
- Rick Springfield – lead vocals; electric guitar (2–12); acoustic guitar (2–12); samples (2); drum programming (2, 4, 6, 7, 9, 11, 12); background vocals (2, 3, 9, 10, 11, 12); loops (2–12); percussion (2–12); keyboard strings (3, 5, 7–10); sitar (3, 12); dobro (4, 5, 7, 11); keyboards (4); vocorder (6); keyboard voices (8, 9); koto (9); Mellotron (9); clavinet (10); piano (11); choirs (12); Wurlitzer (12)
- Tim Pierce – electric guitar (5, 7), 12-string guitar (5, 7); backwards guitars (5); baritone guitar (7)
- Lance Morrison – bass (5, 8)
- Jason Scheff – bass (9)
- Mike Baird – drums (2–5, 8, 10); cymbals (9)
- Jack White – ambient drums (9)
- Phil Shenale – Hammond organ (2–8, 10–12); keyboard strings (5, 6, 8, 11); Oberheim synthesizer (5); African violin, voices (6); Omnivox harmonizer (6); Chamberlain (8); keyboard voices (9, 12)
- Richard Page – background vocals (5, 7, 8, 12)
- Stan Bush – background vocals (2, 4, 5, 7, 8, 10, 11)
- Bill Drescher – loops (2–12, 9–12); percussion (2–12)

== Charts ==
Chart (1999)	Peak position
Billboard 200	189
