= Speak to the Sky =

Single by Rick Springfield

from the album Beginnings
- B-side: "Why?"
- Released: May 1972
- Genre: Bubblegum pop
- Length: 2:42
- Label: Capitol
- Songwriter: Rick Springfield
- Producer: Robie Porter

Rick Springfield singles chronology
"Speak to the Sky" (1972)	"What Would the Children Think" (1972)

"Speak to the Sky" is the debut single by Rick Springfield. It reached No. 6 in Australia, No. 8 on the Canadian adult contemporary chart, No. 10 on the Canadian pop chart, No. 14 on the U.S. pop chart, and No. 16 on the U.S. Adult Contemporary chart in 1972. It was featured on his 1972 album Beginnings.

The song was arranged by Del Newman and produced by Robie Porter.

The song ranked No. 96 on Billboard magazine's Top 100 singles of 1972.

== Other versions ==
- Lonnie Donegan released a version of the song as a single in 1972 in the UK, but it did not chart.
- Judith Durham and the Seekers released a version of the song on their 1997 album Future Road.
- Durham released an a cappella version of the song on her 2009 album Up Close and Personal.
