= Jessie's Girl =

Single by Rick Springfield

from the album Working Class Dog
- B-side: "Carry Me Away"
- Released: 30 January 1981
- Genre: Power pop
- Length: 3:14
- Label: RCA Victor
- Songwriter: Rick Springfield
- Producer: Keith Olsen

Rick Springfield singles chronology
"Take a Hand" (1976)	"Jessie's Girl" (1981)	"I've Done Everything for You" (1981)

Audio sample
- file; help

"Jessie's Girl" is a song written and performed by Australian singer Rick Springfield. It was released on the album Working Class Dog, which was released on January 30, 1981. The song is about unrequited love of a young man for his good friend's girlfriend.

Upon its release in the United States in 1981, "Jessie's Girl" was slow to break out. It debuted on the Billboard Hot 100 chart on 28 March but took 19 weeks to hit No. 1 reaching that position on 1 August, one of the slowest climbs to No. 1 at that time. It remained in that position for two weeks and would be Springfield's only No. 1 hit. The song was at No. 1 when MTV launched on 1 August 1981. The song ultimately spent 32 weeks on the chart. Billboard ranked it as No. 5 for all of 1981.

The song also peaked at No. 1 in Springfield's native country of Australia and later won him a Grammy Award for Best Male Rock Vocal Performance at the 24th Annual Grammy Awards.

"Jessie's Girl" was released in the United Kingdom in March 1984 and peaked at No. 43 on the UK Singles Chart in April 1984.

Record World said that "a strong rhythm guitar fuels the pop-rocker while Rick's determined vocal works the hook."

Springfield recorded an acoustic version of the song for his 1999 album, Karma.

== Background ==
In the late 1970s, Rick Springfield took a stained glass class in Pasadena. Also in the class was a man named Gary as well as Gary's girlfriend. Springfield became friends with both, while developing feelings for the girlfriend. He wrote the song based on the negative feelings he had about the situation. Springfield initially wanted to use the actual name of his friend, but decided to go with a different name as "Gary" didn't sound good when being sung. He chose "Jessie" because he was wearing a T-shirt with the name of football player Ron Jessie on it.

Springfield says that he does not remember the name of the girlfriend, and he believes that the real woman who inspired the song has no idea that she was "Jessie's Girl". He told Oprah Winfrey, "I was never really introduced to her. It was always just, like, panting from afar." Springfield told Songfacts that Winfrey's people had tried to find her, and they got as far back as finding out that the teacher of the class had died two years previously and that his class records were thrown out one year after his death. In 2006, the song was named No. 20 on VH1's "100 Greatest Songs of the 80s".

== Personnel ==
Credits sourced from Mix

- Rick Springfield – lead and backing vocals, rhythm guitars
- Neil Giraldo – lead guitars, bass guitar
- Gabriel Katona – synthesizers
- Mike Baird – drums

== Charts ==
=== Weekly charts ===
Chart (1981)	Peak position
Australia (Kent Music Report)	1
Canada Top Singles (RPM)	6
New Zealand (Recorded Music NZ)	21
US Billboard Hot 100	1
US Mainstream Rock Airplay (Billboard)	10
US Cash Box Top 100	1
US Record World Singles	1

Chart (1984)	Peak position
Ireland (IRMA)	25
UK Singles (Official Charts)	43

=== Year-end charts ===
Chart (1981)	Position
Australia (Kent Music Report)	15
Canada (RPM Top 100 Singles)	55
US Billboard Hot 100	5
US Cash Box Top 100	3

=== All-time charts ===
Chart (1958–2018)	Position
US Billboard Hot 100	186

== Certifications ==
Region	Certification	Certified units/sales
Canada (Music Canada)	Gold	75,000^{^}
New Zealand (RMNZ)	4× Platinum	120,000^{‡}
United Kingdom (BPI)	Platinum	600,000^{‡}
United States (RIAA)	Gold	1,961,928
^{^} Shipments figures based on certification alone.^{‡} Sales+streaming figures based on certification alone.

== Coheed and Cambria sequel ==
On 21 August 2020, the American progressive rock band Coheed and Cambria released a music video entitled "Jessie's Girl 2" to their official YouTube channel. The video depicts Springfield, who supplies some of the song's vocals, working in a bar while the titular "Jessie's Girl" wreaks havoc. The lyrics state that the protagonist from the original song was successful in stealing the Girl away from Jessie, but realizes that she is mentally unstable. The protagonist muses that he was likely set up by Jessie, in order for him to be rid of the woman, and that he (the protagonist) is now trapped in a loveless marriage with children and a future he did not want. The video ends with the Girl stealing the barkeeper's keys and escaping. The song also references Tommy Tutone's "867-5309/Jenny" via lyrics that mention the protagonist changing his number.

The band's frontman, Claudio Sanchez, stated that the song is "kind of like a National Lampoon’s movie meets So I Married an Axe Murderer." Sanchez had originally come up with the idea of a sequel during a 2019 studio session and later approached Springfield to pitch the idea via an Instagram Live session. Springfield liked the draft prepared by Coheed and Cambria and agreed to participate.

Coheed and Cambria released the single digitally and as a 7-inch single in September 2020.

== In popular culture ==
In regards to the song's use in films such as Boogie Nights and 13 Going on 30 over 20 years after its original release, Springfield said, "I'm thrilled by it. As a writer, all you can ask is that a song has legs. It has an appeal that keeps coming back."

In 2010, Jessie's Girl was covered on Glee in the episode Laryngitis. In the same year, the cover was certified gold by the Australian Recording Industry Association.

== See also ==
- List of Billboard Hot 100 number-one singles of 1981
- List of Cash Box Top 100 number-one singles of 1981
- List of number-one singles in Australia during the 1980s
