= Greg Fulginiti =

American recording engineer

Fulginiti with a disc cutting lathe

Gregory Fulginiti (born 1951) is an American recording and mastering engineer. He was nominated for the TEC Awards by Mix magazine six times, in 1985 and 1987–1991.

== Career ==
Fulginiti grew up in Wildwood, New Jersey, and graduated from Wildwood High School in 1969.

Fulginiti began working in 1969 as a mailroom clerk at Elektra Records, and he advanced to assistant engineer with the 1970 Judy Collins album Whales & Nightingales. He shifted in 1971 to work at Sterling Sound in New York City as a mastering engineer. After participating in a number of successful albums, he moved to Los Angeles to work at Artisan Sound Recorders. He mastered the Bonnie Raitt album Nick of Time (1989) which won a Grammy Award for Album of the Year for Raitt and producer Don Was. He left the music business for a year in 1991, temporarily moving to Florida, then left again in 1994 to take over the family business in New Jersey.
