= Rick Springfield =

Musician and actor (born 1949)

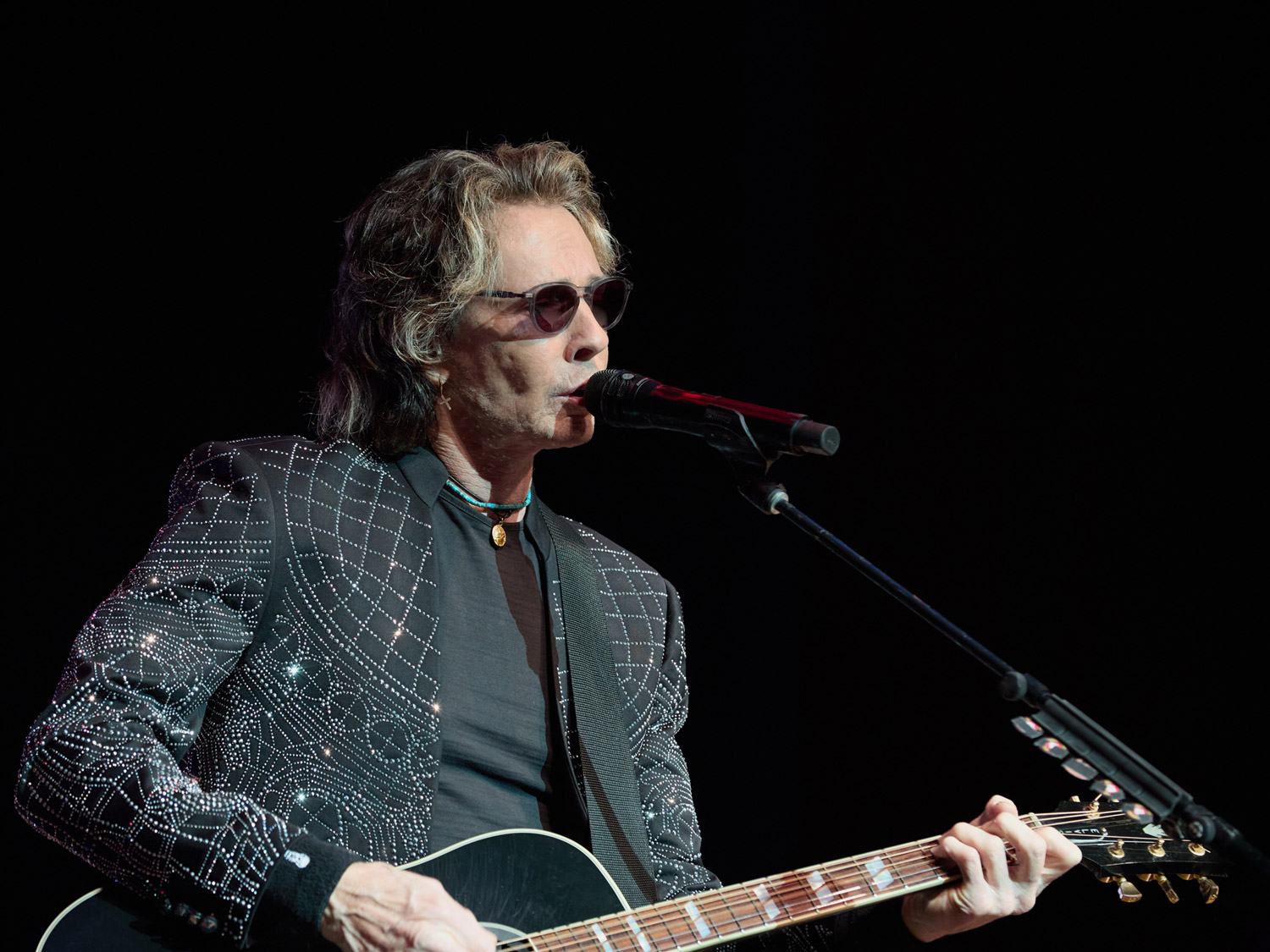
- Springfield in 2025 on tour with Richard Marx
- Born: Richard Lewis Springthorpe; 23 August 1949 (age 77); Guildford, New South Wales, Australia
- Citizenship: Australia (1949–present); United States (2006–present)
- Occupations: Singer; musician; actor; songwriter; record producer
- Years active: 1962–present
- Spouse: Barbara Porter (m. 1984)
- Children: 2
- Musical career
- Genres: Rock; power pop; pop rock; hard rock
- Instruments: Vocals; guitar; keyboards
- Labels: Sparmac; RCA; Capitol; Warner; Gomer; Frontiers
- Formerly of: Zoot; The Morris Springfield Project; The Red Locusts; Sound City Players
- Website: rickspringfield.com

Richard Lewis Springthorpe (born 23 August 1949), known professionally as Rick Springfield, is an Australian-American musician and actor. He was a member of the pop rock group Zoot from 1969–71, then started his solo career with his debut single, "Speak to the Sky", which reached the top-ten in Australia in mid-1972. When he moved to the United States, he had a number-one hit with "Jessie's Girl" in 1981 in both Australia and the United States, for which he received the Grammy Award for Best Male Rock Vocal Performance. He followed with four more top-ten US hits: "I've Done Everything for You", "Don't Talk to Strangers", "Affair of the Heart" and "Love Somebody". Springfield's two top-ten US albums are Working Class Dog (1981) and Success Hasn't Spoiled Me Yet (1982).

As an actor, Springfield starred in the film Hard to Hold in 1984 and the television series High Tide from 1994 to 1997. He appeared in supporting roles in Ricki and the Flash and True Detective (both 2015). He portrayed Noah Drake on the daytime drama General Hospital (1981–1983, 2005–2008, 2012), returning in 2013 for the show's 50th anniversary with his son, actor Liam Springthorpe. He played a depraved version of himself in Californication (2009). He has also appeared in episodes of Supernatural, Hot in Cleveland, and American Horror Story. In 2010, Springfield published his autobiography, Late, Late at Night: A Memoir.

== Early life ==
Rick Springfield was born Richard Lewis Springthorpe on 23 August 1949 in Guildford, a western suburb of Sydney. He is the son of Eileen Louise (Evennett) and Norman James Springthorpe, an Australian Army career officer. His maternal grandparents were English. When he was young, he lived at the army camp with his family in Broadmeadows, Victoria, Australia. Springfield attended Ashwood High School in Melbourne during the 1960s. At 14, he saw the Beatles perform at Festival Hall in Melbourne.

== Career ==
=== Music ===
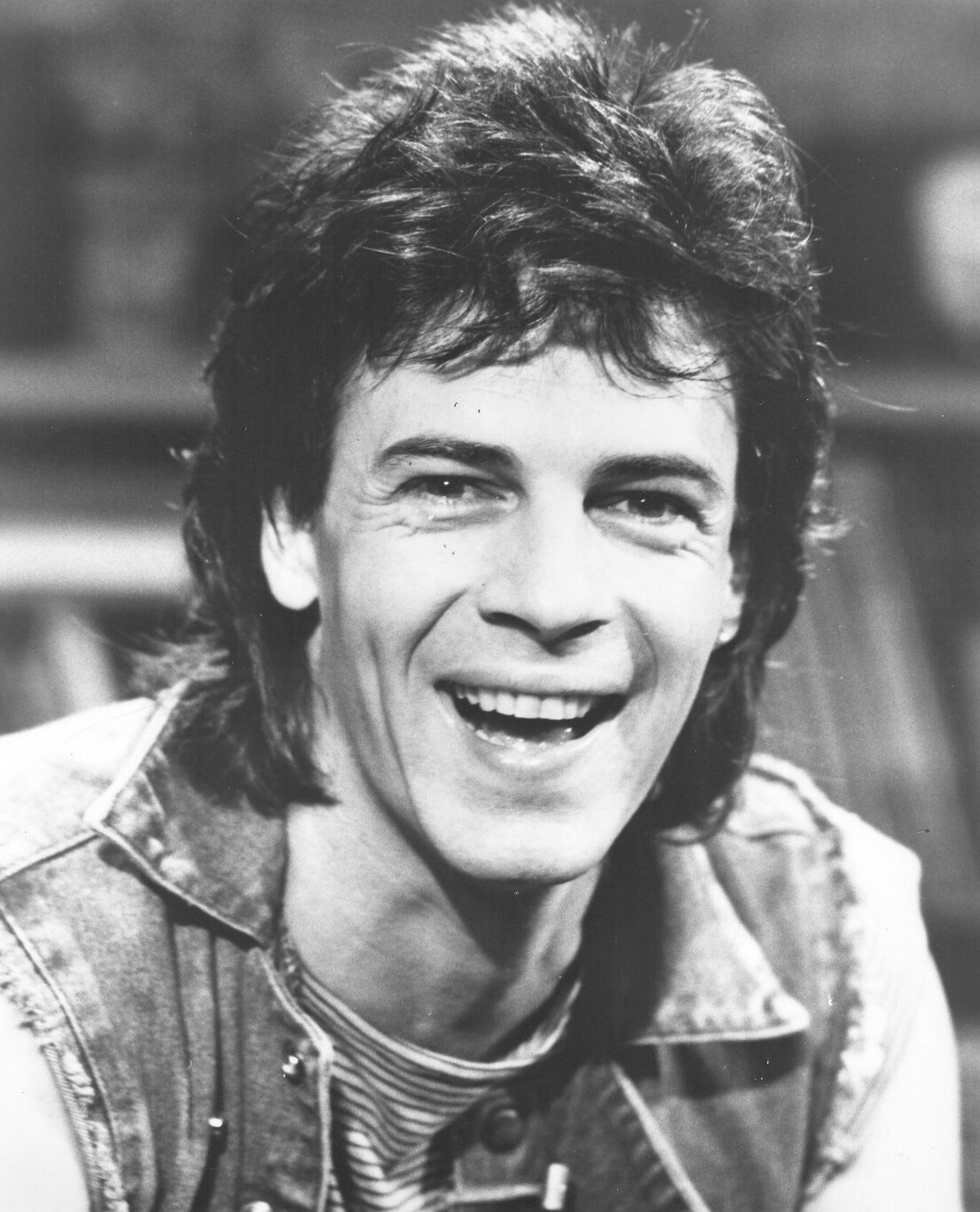
Springfield in 1984

Springfield was 13 years old when he learned to play guitar. He joined various bands in England, where his father was stationed from 1958 to 1963, and joined several more bands after returning to Australia. In 1968, Springfield was approached by bass guitarist Pete Watson to join his group Rockhouse; Watson changed the band's name to MPD Ltd later that year. Another member of MPD Ltd was drummer Danny Finley.

In October 1968, when Springfield was 17, the band traveled to South Vietnam where they entertained troops for several months during the Vietnam War. While staying overnight with American troops at a camp near Da Nang they came under attack from a Viet Cong unit. Springfield was asked to drop mortar shells into a launch-tube, one of which, he learned, had killed a Viet Cong soldier. The knowledge that he "was responsible for the end of a life" has bothered him ever since.

After returning to Australia, Springfield and his bandmates formed Wickedy Wak. They were joined by Phil Blackmore on keyboards and Dick Howard. Go-Set journalist Molly Meldrum produced Wickedy Wak's single, "Billie's Bikie Boys", with Beeb Birtles of the pop rock group Zoot as a backing vocalist.

In September 1969, Springfield replaced Roger Hicks as lead guitarist and vocalist in Zoot, with Birtles on bass guitar and vocals, Darryl Cotton on lead vocals and guitar, and Rick Brewer on drums. Upon joining Zoot, Springfield adopted the "Think Pink – Think Zoot" theme that had the band members dressed head to toe in pink satin. The publicity gimmick brought attention to the group and attracted numerous teenage girl fans, but caused problems in establishing their credibility as serious rock musicians. Zoot's fifth single, "Hey Pinky", was written by Springfield. The group attempted to shake off their teeny-bopper image. They followed with a hard rock cover version of The Beatles' hit "Eleanor Rigby", which peaked at No. 4 on Go-Set's Top 40 in March 1971. Despite another hit single with "Freak" in April, which was written by Springfield, the band broke up in May.

Springfield signed with Sparmac Records and issued his debut solo single, "Speak to the Sky", in October, which peaked at No. 5 on the Go-Set singles chart. Sparmac label owner, Robie Porter, was also producer and manager for Springfield. After recording his debut album, Beginnings, in London, Springfield moved to the United States in mid-1972. Springfield provided all the songwriting, lead vocals, guitar, keyboard and banjo for the album. In August 1972, "Speak to the Sky" was issued in the U.S. by Capitol Records and peaked at No. 14 on the Billboard Hot 100 in September. Beginnings was the first of seven top 40 Springfield albums on the related Billboard 200. However, follow-up success was hampered by rumours that Capitol Records paid people to purchase Springfield's albums, which led to some radio stations boycotting his music.

In 1973, Springfield signed to Columbia Records and recorded his second album, Comic Book Heroes, which was also produced by Porter. In Australia, released on Porter's new label, Wizard Records, the album and its two singles failed to chart. Springfield was promoted as a teen pop idol similar to David Cassidy and Donny Osmond. Springfield spoke of the teenybopper image in Circus Magazine in 1973. He said he was not sure how it happened. "Someone saw my photo and that was it." He went on to say that someone asked to take a photo of him in a white suit and thought that it was "a bit dull", so he took some crayons and "scrawled an R with a lightning bolt going through it ... which became my emblem." From September to December 1973, Springfield starred as "himself" in the ABC-TV Saturday morning cartoon series Mission: Magic!, for which he usually wrote and performed an original song in each episode. In 1974, he issued an Australia-only album, Mission: Magic!, which was "full of infectious bubblegum pop songs". His single, "Take a Hand", reached the U.S. top 50 in 1976. The single was taken from the album Wait for Night, which was issued by his new label, Chelsea Records. Soon after its release, the record company folded. During the late 1970s, he concentrated more on his acting career, guest-starring in several primetime TV dramas.

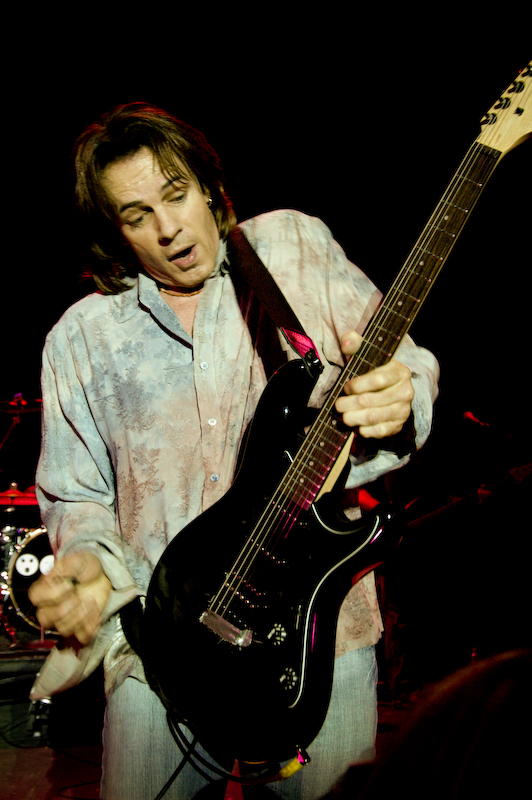
Springfield during the shock/denial/anger/acceptance tour in 2004

Springfield continued to write and record and, in 1981, released his next album, Working Class Dog. The album spawned the single "Jessie's Girl", a worldwide hit which peaked at No. 1 for two weeks in the U.S. on the Hot 100 and the Australian Kent Music Report singles chart. Springfield won the 1981 Grammy Award for Best Male Rock Vocal Performance. Working Class Dog reached No.7 on the Billboard 200. Another top 10 single from the album was the Sammy Hagar-penned "I've Done Everything for You". He had further success with the follow-up albums Success Hasn't Spoiled Me Yet (1982) and Living in Oz (1983). Springfield was frustrated with people in interviews mistaking him for Bruce Springsteen, expressed in the track "Bruce" on the album Beautiful Feelings (1984). In 1984, Springfield starred in his own film, Hard to Hold, and recorded the majority of the material on the accompanying soundtrack. The soundtrack included a top-ten hit, "Love Somebody", as well as several moderately successful follow-up singles. However, the film itself was not successful, and the soundtrack's success, though higher than that of the film, paled in comparison to Springfield's previous albums. Nonetheless, Springfield released his next album Tao in 1985, scoring several modest hits from this release, including "State of the Heart" and "Celebrate Youth". That same year, Springfield was one of several performers who participated in the Live Aid charity concert. Around this time, he took a brief hiatus from recording.

Between 1985 (after the release of Tao) and 2020, Springfield recorded and released nine studio albums.

Springfield returned in 2020 via a one-off featured performance in the Coheed and Cambria single "Jessie's Girl 2", a sequel to the 1981 Springfield single "Jessie's Girl".

In 2021, Springfield started hosting a weekly radio show on SiriusXM's "80s on 8" Channel called 'Working Class DJ with Rick Springfield', the musician spins eight songs around a theme.

In 2021, Springfield joined Russell Morris and formed The Morris Springfield Project. The Morris Springfield Project released Jack Chrome and the Darkness Waltz in October 2021 which debuted at number 34 on the ARIA Charts.

=== Acting ===
Springfield made his acting debut on The Six Million Dollar Man on 30 October 1977, in an episode entitled "Rollback". In December, he appeared on The Hardy Boys/Nancy Drew Mysteries, portraying Ned Nickerson. On 20 January 1978, Springfield guest-starred on an episode of Wonder Woman titled "Screaming Javelin". The character he portrayed was Tom, the concerned fiancé of an Olympic gymnast who had been kidnapped by a megalomaniac. Later in 1978, Springfield played the character of Zac in Saga of a Star World, which was, with some differences, the pilot episode of the original Battlestar Galactica TV series. He also co-starred as Keith Stewart in episode 17 of season 4 ("Dwarf in a Helium Hat") on The Rockford Files and as Tommy Archer in episode 4 ("Murder on the Flip Side") of The Eddie Capra Mysteries in 1978. In 1979, he guest-starred on an episode of "The Incredible Hulk" entitled "The Disciple" as Michael Roark, a San Francisco police officer who must decide whether to avenge the death of his father who was also a police officer, or simply provide justice and capture the alleged criminal.

In 1981, he became a soap opera star on General Hospital. He had signed a contract with RCA Records and already recorded the album Working Class Dog, which neither he nor his agent had expected would do very well, which is why Springfield took the soap role. But the song "Jessie's Girl" went to No. 1 and Springfield ended up both playing the role of Dr. Noah Drake from 1981 to 1983, while simultaneously going on tour with his band. The success of the song boosted the ratings of the show which, according to Springfield, "became the biggest show on TV for that summer". The fame from the show also boosted the sale of the song.

In 1984, Springfield made a full-length feature film titled Hard to Hold. In 1998, he played in the film Legion. He also wrote the soundtrack for Hard to Hold. In 1992, he played the title role in the short-lived ABC series Human Target, based on the DC Comics character of the same name. In 1989, he starred in the film Nick Knight, in which he played an 800-year-old vampire seeking a cure for his condition. The film was later remade as the first two episodes of the series Forever Knight. In 1991, he appeared in the television film Dying to Dance. In 1994, he starred in the series Robin's Hoods. From 1994 to 1997, he starred in the television series High Tide that ran for 69 episodes.

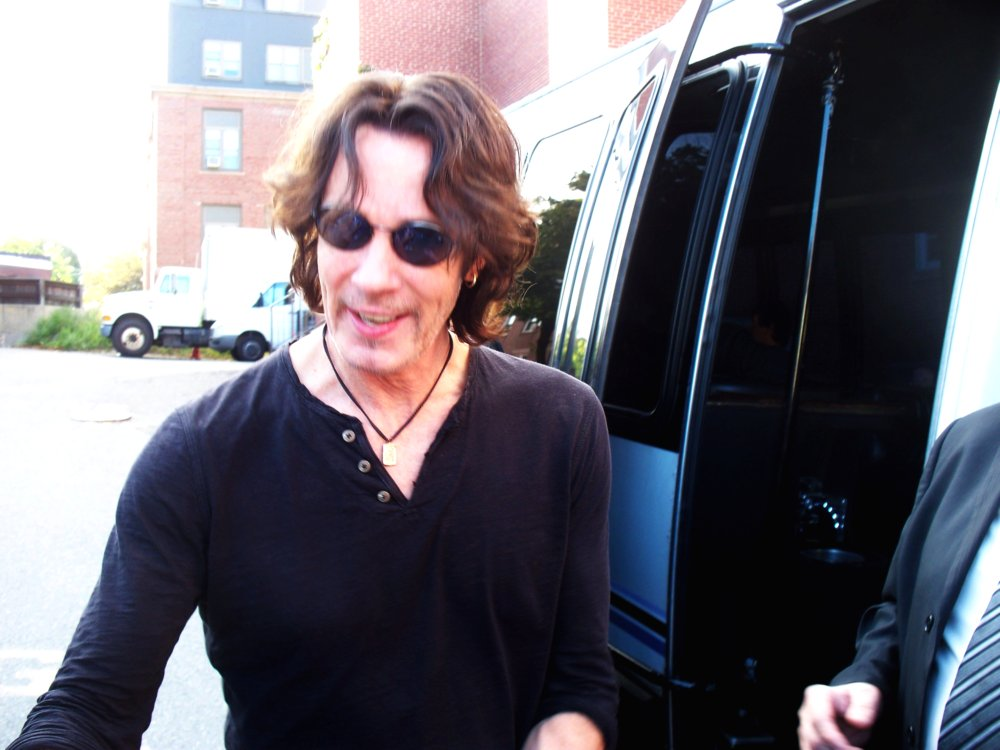
Springfield in September 2011 before a performance in Boston

In addition to the roles on television and in film, Springfield also acted in musical theatre. In 1995, he was a member of the original Broadway cast of the musical Smokey Joe's Cafe. This Tony Award-nominated musical featured the songs of rock & roll songwriters Jerry Leiber and Mike Stoller. From February 2000 to December 2002, Springfield performed in EFX Alive! at the MGM Grand in Las Vegas, Nevada. Springfield starred in several episodes of the third season of Showtime's Californication. His first appearance was in episode 3 on 11 October 2009, in which he plays a "twisted version of himself"; a "hedonistic Rick Springfield" from the past. Springfield starred in "Ho'ohuli Na'au", an episode of Hawaii Five-0. He played the role of photographer Renny Sinclair.

In December 2005, Springfield was asked by the General Hospital producers to return to the show in his role as Dr. Noah Drake after a 23-year absence. His run was subsequently extended as a recurring guest star, but not a regular cast member. Springfield returned to General Hospital as Drake in April 2013.

Springfield also starred in "Everything Goes Better With Vampires", an episode of Hot in Cleveland. He played the role of a toll booth worker who pretended to be the famous singer/musician Rick Springfield in an attempt to impress women. Springfield had a recurring role on True Detective as Dr. Irving Pitlor, a psychiatrist. In 2015, Springfield appeared as Greg alongside Meryl Streep in the film Ricki and the Flash. In 2016, Springfield was cast in the twelfth season of The CW series Supernatural where he played rocker Vince Vincente and Lucifer. In July 2016, Springfield appeared on ABC's Greatest Hits. In October 2017, Springfield appeared as Pastor Charles on FX's American Horror Story: Cult. In July 2018, Rick played himself on Episode 4 of the YouTube original series Sideswiped.

== Personal life ==
When Springfield was 17, he attempted suicide by hanging himself. In his memoir, he recalls hanging from a rope for 15 to 20 seconds before the knot unraveled and he fell to the floor.

Springfield has struggled with depression for several decades. In an interview with ABC News' Paula Faris, he discussed his mental health problem in an attempt to inspire others who were struggling with similar problems, saying: "I'm an example of the moment passing, because I've been there a couple of times, and haven't ... for want of a better phrase, pulled the trigger." In January 2018, Springfield stated he contemplated suicide in 2017. When learning of the suicides of actor Robin Williams in 2014, and musicians Chester Bennington and Chris Cornell both in 2017, Springfield recalled thinking: "I didn't go, 'Oh that's terrible.' I went, 'I get it.' I get being that lost and dark."

From late 1974 to early 1976, Springfield was in a romantic relationship with actress Linda Blair, beginning when she was 15 and he was 25.

On 24 April 1981, his father, Norman James Springthorpe, died.

In October 1984, Springfield married girlfriend Barbara Porter at his family's church in Australia. They had met several years earlier when Springfield was recording Working Class Dog and she was working as the recording studio receptionist. They have two sons, Liam (born 1985) and Joshua (born 1989). In 1985, when his first son was born and after the release of his Tao album, Springfield took a break from his musical career to spend more time with his family and to deal with the depression that had affected him since his adolescence.

Springfield was often unfaithful to Porter early in their marriage, which nearly led to divorce. In his memoir, Springfield referred to his infidelity as his "sexual issue," and he believes it was a habit he "fell into as a young musician." In a 2010 interview, he claimed the last time he cheated on Porter was 2002.

At a concert at the House of Blues in Orlando, Florida, on 2 March 2006, Springfield announced he had become a US citizen.

In September 2026, Springfield revealed that he killed a man in Vietnam in 1968. Springfield said he was performing for American troops near Da Nang when their camp came under attack and he was asked to help launch mortar bombs. Additionally, Springfield says he later learned one bomb he launched had killed a Viet Cong combatant, a fact he found deeply upsetting and which bothered him for many years.

He practices Transcendental Meditation. Springfield is a pescetarian.

=== Memoir ===
Springfield's autobiography Late, Late at Night: A Memoir (ISBN 978-1-4391-9115-6) was released in 2010. In October, it peaked at No. 13 on The New York Times Best Seller list. In May 2014, Springfield published Magnificent Vibration: a novel, which also made The New York Times Best Seller list.

In August 2012, Late, Late at Night was named No. 23 of "The 25 Great Rock Memoirs of All Time" by Rolling Stone.

== Songs referencing Springfield ==
In 1985, Jimmy Hart recorded the song "Eat Your Heart Out Rick Springfield", featured on The Wrestling Album. The premise of the song is that the object of Hart's affection seems to idolise Springfield to the point that Hart feels rivalled by him, prompting Hart to pick up singing as well in order to compete for his girl's affection. The song makes references to "Dr Noah Drake" as well as to "Jessie's Girl". In a 2014 interview, Springfield said that although he had heard the title and was aware of the song's existence and had met with Jimmy Hart in person, he had never actually heard the song.

Jonathan Coulton recorded the song "Je Suis Rick Springfield" about an American man trying to impress a French girl he just met in France by pretending to be Springfield. It was recorded in 2011 and appeared on the album Artificial Heart.

In 1998, The Szuters recorded and released the song "The Rick Springfield Song" as part of The Szuters' American Pop album.

== Discography ==
- Beginnings (1972)
- Comic Book Heroes (1973)
- Mission: Magic! (1974)
- Wait for Night (1976)
- Working Class Dog (1981)
- Success Hasn't Spoiled Me Yet (1982)
- Living in Oz (1983)
- Hard to Hold (1984)
- Beautiful Feelings (1984)
- Tao (1985)
- Rock of Life (1988)
- Rick Springfield: Greatest Hits (1989)
- Sahara Snow (1997)
- Karma (1999)
- Shock/Denial/Anger/Acceptance (2004)
- The Day After Yesterday (2005)
- Christmas with You (2007)
- Venus in Overdrive (2008)
- My Precious Little One: Lullabies for a New Generation (2009)
- From the Vault (2010)
- Songs for the End of the World (2012)
- Rocket Science (2016)
- The Snake King (2018)
- Orchestrating My Life (2019)
- The Red Locusts (2021)
- Jack Chrome & the Darkness Waltz (2021)
- Working Class Dog (40th Anniversary Live) (2022)
- Springfield (2023)
- Automatic (2023)
- Big Hits: Rick Springfield's Greatest Hits, Volume 2 (2025)
- Buzzkill (The Locustz) (2026)

== Filmography ==
=== Films ===
Year	Title	Role(s)	Notes
1984	Hard to Hold	James Roberts	
2015	Ricki and the Flash	Greg	
2021	Traces	Carl	

=== Television ===
Year	Title	Role(s)	Notes
1973	Mission: Magic!	As himself (voice)	Animated adventure series
1977	The Six Million Dollar Man	Niles	Episode: "Rollback"
1977	The Hardy Boys/Nancy Drew Mysteries	Ned Nickerson	Episode: "Will the Real Santa Claus...?"
1978	The Rockford Files	Keith Stuart	Episode: "Dwarf in a Helium Hat"
1978	Battlestar Galactica	Lieutenant Zac	Episode: "Saga of a Star World"
1978	The Eddie Capra Mysteries	Tommy Archer	Episode: "Murder on the Flip Side"
1978	Wonder Woman	Tom	Episode: "Screaming Javelins"
1979	Turnabout	Rick	Episode: "Till Dad Do Us Part"
1979	The Incredible Hulk	Mike Roark	Episode: "The Disciple"
1979	California Fever	Adam	Episode: "Portrait of Laurie"
1979	Wonder Woman	Anton	Episode "Amazon Hot Wax"
1979	CHiPs	Guy at Accident Scene	Episode: "Second Chance"
1981–1983; 2005–2013	General Hospital	Noah Drake	Series regular
1989	Nick Knight	Det. Nick Knight	Television film
1990	Dead Reckoning	Kyle Rath	Television film
1992	Human Target	Christopher Chance	Lead role
1993	In the Shadows, Someone's Watching	Paul Merritt	Television film
1994	A Change of Place	Philip	Television film
1994–1997	High Tide	Mick Barrett	Lead role
1995	Robin's Hoods	Nick Collins	Recurring role; 4 episodes
1997	Johnny Bravo	Andy (voice)	Episode: "Beach Blanket Bravo"
1998	Loyal Opposition: Terror in the White House	Senator Barklay	Television film
1998	Legion	Ryan	Television film
1999	Suddenly Susan	Zach Hayword	2 episodes
1999	Martial Law	Special Agent Stockwell	Episode: "Friendly Skies"
2001	Dying to Dance	Dave Lennox	Television film
2007–2008	General Hospital	Eli Love	Recurring role
2009	Californication	Himself	4 episodes
2011	Hawaii Five-0	Renny Sinclair	Episode: "Ho'ohuli Na'au (Close to Heart)"
2012	Hot in Cleveland	Tom	Episode: "Everything Goes Better with Vampires"
2014	Drop Dead Diva	Liam Matthews	Episode: "First Date"
2014	Family Guy	Himself (voice)	Episode: "Chap Stewie"
2015	True Detective	Dr. Irving Pitlor	3 episodes
2015	The Eric Andre Show	Himself	Episode: "Pauly D & Rick Springfield"
2016	Supernatural	Lucifer / Vince Vincente	3 episodes
2017	American Horror Story: Cult	Pastor Charles	Episode: "Winter of Our Discontent"
2018	Sideswiped	Himself	Episode: "The Rock Star"
2018	The Goldbergs	Gary	Episode: "RAD!"
2020	Duncanville	Bobby Bastille (voice)	Episode: "Jack's Pipe Dream"
2025	All's Fair	Tommy Keith	Episode: "I Want Revenge"

== Awards and nominations ==
=== Go-Set pop poll ===
The Go-Set pop poll was coordinated by teen-oriented pop music paper Go-Set. The paper was established in February 1966 and conducted an annual poll from 1966 to 1972 to determine the most popular personalities.

Year	Nominee / work	Award	Result
1970	Ricky Springfield	Best Guitarist	2nd
1970	Ricky Springfield	Best Composer	5th
1971	himself	Best Guitarist	Won
1971	himself	Best Songwriter/Composer	4th
1972	himself	Best Male	3rd
1972	himself	Best Newcomer	4th
1972	himself	Best Songwriter/Composer	2nd
1972	Best Album	Beginnings	2nd
1972	Best Single	"Hooky Jo"	10th

=== King of Pop Awards ===
The King of Pop Awards were voted by the readers of TV Week. The award started in 1967 and ran through to 1978.

Year	Nominee / work	Award	Result
1971	himself	Best Lead Guitarist	Won
1972	himself	Most Popular Australian Musician	Won

=== Grammy Awards ===
Year	Category	Nominated work	Result
1982	Best Rock Vocal Male Performance	"Jessie's Girl"	Won
1983	Best Rock Vocal Male Performance	"I Get Excited"	Nominated
1983	Best Pop Vocal Performance Male	"Don't Talk to Strangers"	Nominated
1984	Best Rock Vocal Male Performance	"Affair of the Heart"	Nominated

On 9 May 2014, Springfield was honoured with a star on the Hollywood Walk of Fame for his contributions to music.

== Books ==
- Springfield, Rick (12 October 2010). Late, Late at Night: A Memoir (1st Touchstone hardcover ed.). New York: 1Touchstone. ISBN 978-1439191156. OCLC 555638380.
