= John Philip Shenale =

Canadian composer, arranger, musician producer

- Genres: Rock; alternative rock; classical
- Occupations: Composer; arranger; musician; producer
- Instruments: Piano, Hammond, Fender Rhodes, Clavinet, Orchestron, Mellotron, Keyboards
- Years active: 1970–present
- Labels: Columbia, Deutsche Grammophon, Sony, EMI, Elektra, Arista, Motown, Atlantic, BMG, Warner, Capitol, CBS
- Member of: The Forest Rangers
- Formerly of: Royal Macadamians
- Website: johnphilipshenale.com

John Philip Shenale (often mentioned as Phil Shenale) is a Canadian composer, arranger, musician and producer based in Los Angeles.

== Background ==
Shenale was born in Canada in 1951. His family relocated to the United States in the late-1950s. His earliest memories of music consisted of hearing his father, an avid lover of classical music, play the violin, cello and mandolin in their home during his childhood. After attending a Latin High Mass at the age of five, he recalls being drawn to the piano in an attempt to recreate the music he had heard during the ceremony. The experience awakened his passion for the art and he soon found himself improvising his own music. It wasn't until the age of twelve, however, that he began formal piano lessons.

Shenale began serious composition while in high school, drawing inspiration from classical composers such as Ravel, Granados, Britten and Stravinsky. He soon discovered modern-day musicians such as The Yardbirds, Jimi Hendrix and The Beatles which ignited his passion for rock and roll, leading him to form his first band. During his undergraduate studies, he first majored in physics and then music before dropping out in favor of playing and traveling with a hard rock club band.

== Career ==
Shenale has a very deliberate production style, carefully creating a very natural-sounding theatrical background using both cutting-edge and very old tools. He has contributed his talents as a composer, arranger, musician and/or producer to over forty Gold and Platinum albums, both domestic and international and over thirty Top-40 singles. His work has been associated with 21 Grammy nominations.

=== Composer ===
Shenale as a composer has worked with many artists on their studio albums such as Dream Street (Janet Jackson). He has composed songs and scores for films (Return of the Living Dead III, Losin' it, The Dirt Bike Kid, Steel Justice) and the musical score for the dramatized audiobook Son of a Wanted Man.

=== Producer ===
A record producer ensures artists deliver their best performances and supervises the technical engineering of the recording while coordinates the production team and process. Shenale's most well known works as a producer are Backstreets of Desire, Loup Garou, Crow Jane Alley and Pistola with Willy DeVille and Everything with the Bangles band.

He believes the connection to the artist is key while he is working as a producer.

The artist may only bring lyrics, but they bring the story of their life. The producer is sucking all of the life juice out of the artist to get their stamp on the track. From that standpoint, it's not a manipulation of notes, but of reality.

— John Philip Shenale

=== Arranger ===
Shenale has worked as a keyboard arranger and as a string arranger. A music arrangement is a musical adaptation of an existing composition and even though it originates from classical music it's often used in popular music where arrangers include parts for music instruments which were not composed by the original songwriters. The instruments may vary and occasionally use full orchestras or even replace the artist's original performance e.g. Sin Palabras album Tori Amos' vocal performance was left out and replaced by The Appollon Musagete Quartet and Andreas Ottensamer, a clarinet soloist. When it comes down to string arrangements Shenale uses first violins, second violins playing at a lower pitch range, violas and double basses. Shenale did the orchestra arrangements on Gold Dust (Tori Amos).

=== Orchestrator ===
Orchestration is the practice of writing music for an orchestra or a musical ensemble or adapting music composed for another medium for an orchestra. In musical theatre, the composer writes a piano/vocal score and then the orchestrator creates the instrumental score for the pit orchestra to play. Shenale was the orchestrator of The Light Princess, a musical composed by Tori Amos and presented at Royal National Theatre.

=== Conductor ===
Conducting has been defined as "the art of directing the simultaneous performance of several players or singers by the use of gesture". Shenale was the conductor on Midwinter Graces album, American Doll Posse and Abnormally Attracted To Sin (Tori Amos).

=== Prepared Pianos ===
One of his distinctive sonic styles originates in his work on prepared pianos which flourished during his collaboration with Tori Amos and Willy DeVille altering the aesthetics of contemporary piano music following the path of John Cage whose experimentations with prepared pianos uncovered new kind of timbres and instrumental techniques. Shenale prepared an upright piano for Bells For Her which was purposely deconstructed to sound like bells instead of a piano and was used both for the recording and the Under The Pink tour (1994). Barry Walters on PitchFork noted that Tori Amos dug deeper on Bells for her which suggests a ghost pirouetting across John Cage's prepared piano. The pitch on certain keys is way off, like an old upright in your grandparents' basement but the effect is finessed the way Jimi Hendrix bent notes from music to cacophony and back again.

=== Keyboardist ===
He has often played the Chamberlin, an electro-mechanical keyboard instrument that uses the modulation of a magnetic pickup to create sound on many studio albums such as Crow Jane Alley, Pistola (Willy DeVille) and Abnormally Attracted To Sin (Tori Amos).

He occasionally uses the Mellotron, an electro-mechanical musical instrument which was designed to reproduce the sound of the original instrument yet replaying a tape created minor flunctuations in pitch and amplitude, so a note sounds slightly different each time it is played. He used it on the song Me and A Gun (Tori Amos).

Shenale played the Freeman string symphonizer, a 5-octave synthesizer of the 1970s on Reindeer King (Tori Amos). Its sound was related to that of the ARP String Ensemble, a fully polyphonic multi-orchestral synthesizer which produces the sound of glassy-sounding strings. He has used the ARP String Ensemble on Willy DeVille's albums and on other albums as well.

The Hammond organ is an electric organ often played by Shenale on various collaborations. Even though the organ was originally marketed for churches it became popular with professional jazz musicians. He has used the Hammond S6 Chord Organ for The Wrong Band (Tori Amos) along with various other models on his albums with Willy DeVille and Tori Amos.

He had played the Clavinet, an electrically amplified clavichord which is an electro-mechanical instrument that is usually used in conjunction with a keyboard amplifier on the studio albums Crow Jane Alley and Pistola (Willy DeVille).

Shenale used the Fender Rhodes piano which generated sound with keys and hammers but instead of strings, the hammers strike thin metal tines which vibrate to an electromagnetic pick up and then the signal is sent through a cable to an external keyboard amplifier and speaker giving a characteristic "bell" sound. The Wurlitzer electronic piano sounds similarly but the sound is generated by striking a metal reed with a hammer which induces and electric current in a pickup. He has used the Fender Rhodes piano on Nouvelle Vague album (Sylvie Vartan) and the latter on his albums with Willy DeVille and Sylvie Vartan.

He has played both piano and electric piano on various albums along with various models of synthesizers as a keyboardist. His favorite synthesizers are OB SEM 8-voice (OB8), OBSx, Yamaha CS80, hybrids Wave PPG, OB Xpander OSCAR and Prophet VS, Synclav, all of the Nords digital and the first EIII for samplers.

=== Other musical instruments ===
Apart from playing keyboards Shenale has played drums on One Step Ahead of the Blues and Cafe Days (Chris Spedding) and bass on the albums Charmed Life (Billy Idol), Bliss (Celestial Winds) and Purring Squirrels (Purring Squirrels).

=== The Forest Rangers ===
John Philip Shenale has been a member of the roots band The Forest Rangers, the house band of FX television action, crime, drama television series Sons Of Anarchy mostly known for the covers they performed for the series.

== Early work ==
Shenale's early work began in film, a medium he would subsequently revisit throughout his career, with 1971's The Young Graduates. Continuing throughout the 1970s he recorded and performed live with artists such as Gregory Hines, Redbone, Jon Lucien, Bobby Womack and Severance. However, he considers his collaborations, specifically during the latter part of the decade, with artists such as Jim Keltner and The Beach Boys to be of particular value and significance, affording him a considerable amount of time in-studio where he was given the opportunity to work with state-of-the-art equipment and to learn the language and various philosophies behind recording professionally.

Shenale's instruments of choice during this time included the piano, Hammond, Fender Rhodes, Clavinet, Orchestron, Mellotron along with various other synthesizers.

=== In popular music ===
Shenale's work has been featured on albums by artists such as Tori Amos, Willy DeVille, Jane's Addiction, Tracy Chapman, Billy Idol, Janet Jackson, Diana Ross, The Bangles, Dionne Warwick, Rick Springfield, Buddy Guy, Robert Cray and John Hiatt.

=== 1970-1979 ===
He worked with Gregory Hines and his rock band called Severance in his homonym album Severance (1976, Largo, keyboards) and with the American rock band, The Beach Boys, on their album L.A. (Light Album) (1979, Brother/Caribou/CBS, oberheim synthesizers). Good Timin is the second single of the album which reached at No. 40 during a stay of ten weeks on Billboard Hot 100 singles (1979, oberheim synthesizer).

=== 1980–1989 ===
In 1980 he worked with Italian the musician and filmmaker Franco Battiato for the opening song Up Patriots To Arms on his album Patriots (Keyboards). The song was also included on the album Echoes of Sufi Dancers (1985, keyboards).

Shenale worked with Australian-American musician and actor Rick Springfield on his platinum-certified Living in Oz rock album (1983, RCA, keyboards, string arrangements), on Hard to Hold certified platinum, rock, power pop album (1984, RCA, keyboards), on Tao certified gold, synth pop, new wave, rock album (1985, RCA, Keyboards, Synthesizer, DX-7) and on pop, rock Karma album (1999, RCA, violin, organ/Hammond, Synthesizer voices). "Affair Of The Heart" was the hit song from the Living in Oz album. It peaked at No. 9 on the Billboard Hot 100 and it was nominated for a Grammy award for Best Rock Vocal Performance while Living in Oz peaked at No.12, Hard To Hold on No. 16, Tao on No. 21 on Billboard 200. Cash Box said that "Affair Of The Heart shows a greater use of synthesizers and a hardened guitar sound" than previous Springfield songs but retains his ability to create a powerful refrain.

He worked with the German singer, songwriter and actress Nina Hagen on her dance-pop, disco album Fearless (1983, CBS, keyboards).

In 1984 he teamed up with the American singer, songwriter, actress, and dancer Janet Jackson for her Dream Street pop, synth-pop, R&B album (1984, A&M, Composer, arranger, keyboards). The music video for the song "Dream Street", which was co-composed by Shenale, was shot during the shooting of the musical drama TV series Fame in which Janet Jackson played the role of Cleo Hewitt.

He worked with the Brazilian singer-songwriter Roberto Carlos, also known as King of Latin Music or simply The King, on his Latin, pop album Coração (1985, CBS, musician).

He worked with the American singer and songwriter Barry Manilow on his pop album Manilow (1985, RCA, synthesizer) and with the American singer, actress and television host Dionne Warwick on her funk, soul, pop album Finder of Lost Loves (1985, Arista, synthesizer programming).

Shenale worked with the American singer Belinda Carlisle on her pop, rock album Belinda (1986, IRS, Keyboards, synthesizer) which was certified Gold and it peaked at No.13 at Billboard 200 and on her greatest hits album,The Best of Belinda, Volume 1 (1992, Keyboards, synthesizer) which was certified as a multiplatinum album.

He worked with the American rock duo David & David on their rock album Boomtown (1986, A&M, programming). "Welcome To The Boomtown", the themed debut hit single reached No. 37 on the Billboard Hot 100, No. 8 on the Billboard Top Rock Tracks chart and peaked at No. 27 in Australia.

He collaborated with Bonnie Tyler on her Secret Dreams and Forbidden Fire certified gold, pop, rock album (1986, CBS, synthesizer). Seven singles were released from the album including "Holding out for a Hero" (programming, synthesizer) which was featured in the musical drama film Footloose, it was included in its certified multiplatinum soundtrack album Footloose and peaked on No. 34 on Billboard Hot 100.

He wrote the song I Want To Be Needed for Shari Belafonte and Chris Norman (an English soft rock singer known for being the lead vocalist of the band Smokie) which featured on the albums Eyes of Night (1987, Ariola), Hits from the Heart (1988) and Heartbreaking Hits (2004).

John Philip Shenale worked with James Reyne an Australian singer-songwriter, on his debut rock album James Reyne (1987, Capital, keyboards) which was listed as one of the Top 25 albums for 1987 in Australia.

His collaboration with the American pop rock band The Bangles started with the Everything platinum pop, rock album (1988, CBS). He shaped the song "Eternal Flame" into a keyboard driven music hit (1988, Keyboards, Producer, Programming). He worked on their The Essential Bangles pop, rock album (2004, Columbia, keyboards, programming) and on the We Are the '80s pop, rock album (2006, keyboards, programming).

He worked with British-Australian singer and actress Olivia Newton-John on The Rumour pop album (1988, MCA, Keyboards, programming) and with the American alternative rock band Dreams So Real on its rock album Rough Night in Jericho (1988, Arista, Keyboards). The title track reached No. 28 on the Billboard Mainstream Rock Chart.

In 1989 John Philip Shenale worked with the American singer, songwriter and actress Natalie Cole on her certified gold, R&B, adult contemporary album Good to be Back (1989, EMI, synthesizer, programming) which was nominated for two Grammy Awards (Best R&B Vocal Performance – female, We Sing Praises/track Best R&B Performance by A Duo Or Group With Vocal). The album peaked at No. 59 of Billboard 200.

He worked with Jimmy Hamen on Can't Fight the Midnight pop, rock album (1989, Polygram, keyboards) and with Jeff Silverman & Kevin Raleigh on Delusions of Grandeur pop, rock album (1989, Keyboards).

He collaborated with Canadian singer-songwriter Paul Hyde on his album Turtle Island (1989, Capitol, piano).

He worked with English folk, rock band River City People on their debut studio album Say Something Good (1989, Capitol, keyboards, keyboard programming) which peaked at No. 23 in the UK and remained in the charts for nine weeks.

He worked with Jimmy Harnen, the lead singer of the band Synch, on his only solo rock album Can't Fight The Midnight (1989, WTG, keyboards).

=== 1990–1999 ===
John Philip Shenale collaborated with Jane's Addiction, a Los Angeles quartet which was one of the most influential and iconic alternative rock bands of the late 1980s and the early 1990s on their certified multiplatinum, alternative metal, hard rock, alternative rock, funk metal, psychedelic album Ritual de lo Habitual (1990, Warner, strings) which was nominated for a Grammy Award for Best Hard Rock Performance. "Been Caught Stealing" was released as the third single from the album and became the band's biggest hit, spending four weeks at No.1 on the US Billboard Modern Rock chart. The song's accompanying music video humorously depicted people (including the band members) shoplifting at a grocery store and won a MTV Video Music Award for Best Alternative Video. John Philip Shenale is credited with the strings arrangement on Three Days, and he also performed on Then She Did...

He has been a member of the Royal Macadamians band along with Davitt Sigerson, John Beverly Jones and Bob Thiele Jr. releasing the Experiments in Terror electronic, rock, funk, soul, pop album (1990, Island) creating an arty and idiosyncratic mixture of jazz-and-funk-infected tunes given a surrealistic spin.

In 1990, John Philip Shenale worked as an engineer for Robert Cray's certified gold, blues album Midnight Stroll (PolyGram), which was nominated for a Grammy Award for Best Contemporary Blues Recording. The album sold over five hundred million copies and peaked at No. 51 on the Billboard 200.

He worked with American musician Ernie Isley on his R&B, funk, rock album High Wire (1990, Elektra, keyboards) and on his funk, soul album Rubáiyát (1990, Elektra, keyboards). The album peaked at No. 174 on the Billboard 200.

He worked with American singer and songwriter Victoria Williams on her adult alternative pop/rock, indie rock, contemporary folk album Swing The Statue! (1990, Rough Trade, Hammond organ, Kurzweil horns).

He collaborated with rock band Alice in Chains on its debut grunge, heavy metal, alternative metal, hard rock album Facelift (1990, CBS, musician) which was officially certified as twice platinum. The album's single, "Man In The Box", was nominated for a Grammy Award (Best Hard Rock Performance With Vocal).

Shenale worked with American singer, songwriter and artist Sarah Hickman on her folk, pop album Shortstop (1990, Elektra, organ, string section, keyboards, tin whistle).

The same year he played the bass on Billy Idol's Charmed Life, certified platinum, hard rock album (1990, Chrysalis, bass). The lead single "Cradle of Love" was nominated for a Grammy Award (Best Rock Vocal Performance, Male).

He worked with French singer and actor Marc Lavoine on his certified gold, pop album Paris (1991, BMG, keyboards, synthesizer, drum programming) and with John Campbell on his blues album One Believer (1991, Elektra/WEA, engineer).

He has worked with Australian rock singer Jimmy Barnes on his certified multiplatinum, soul album Soul Deep (1991, Mushroom, keyboards, horn arrangements, string arrangements) which peaked at No.1 ARIA album charts, his certified platinum, rock album Heat (1993, Mushroom. keyboards) which peaked at No. 2 ARIA album charts, his certified multiplatinum, rock album Flesh and Wood (1994, Mushroom, Piano, string arrangements) which peaked at No. 2 ARIA album charts, his certified multiplatinum rock album Barnes Hits Anthology (1996, Horn, Keyboards, string arrangements) which peaked at No. 1 ARIA album charts, and his rock, blues album JB50 (2006, piano, keyboards, horn arrangements, string arrangements). John Farnham and Jimmy Barnes performed a cover of the soul ballad, "When Something Is Wrong With My Baby" (1991). String and horn inserts were arranged by Shenale and added the "Memphis" sound to the production. The song charted at No. 2 nationally in Australia. "I Gotcha" peaked at No. 6 and "Ain't No Mountain High Enough" peaked at No. 28. In 1993, "Sweat It Out" peaked at No. 11, "Stand Up" peaked at No. 41, "Stone Cold" peaked at No. 4 and "Right by Your Side" peaked at No. 43. "Still Got A Long Way To Go" was released as a single from the Flesh and Wood album, a collaborative song by Jimmy Barnes and Diesel and peaked at No. 57 on Australia ARIA singles chart.

He worked with The Raindogs band on their roots rock, Celtic folk album Border Drive-In Theatre (1991, Atco, keyboards).

He worked with American musician, composer and producer Billy Falcon on his rock, folk, world, and country album Pretty Blue World (1991, PolyGram, percussion). The single, "Power Windows" peaked at No. 43 on Billboard Hot 100.

Shenale collaborated with the American-Australian singer-songwriter Toni Childs on her pop, rock album House of Hope (1991, A&M, keyboards, programming) which was certified as two times platinum in Australia and platinum in New Zealand. Los Angeles Times noted that despite its title the album is like a haunted house. Through its halls walk tormented ghosts, each one a victim of incestuous fathers and alcoholic husbands, of circumstances and of themselves. Toni Childs noted that the album talks about a lot of things that we don't like to acknowledge because it feels like there's a stigma, like we are not supposed to talk about them. We talk about a dark album but she is shining light on these things to make it more light. He collaborated with her again on the Ultimate Collection, an adult alternative, pop/rock alternative/indie rock, contemporary pop/rock album (2000, keyboards, programming).

JPS has been one of Tori Amos' close musical mentors, a musician who detuned an old upright piano (prepared piano) for "Bells For Her", and a long-time arranger, engineer of the sessions, and collaborator on her studio albums. Their collaboration started with the certified platinum album Little Earthquakes (1992, Atlantic, programming). His experimental approach to arrangements painted a distinctive sonic landscape which was notable since her certified platinum album Under the Pink (1994, Atlantic) which was nominated for a Grammy Award for Best Alternative Performance. John Philip Shenale was the arranger of "Pretty Good Year", "Baker Baker", "Yes, Anastasia" and "Cloud On My Tongue" while he played the organ on "The Wrong Band". Her record label had brought in another arranger at first for a four-song session with a 50-piece orchestra but Amos didn't feel it and erased everything without telling her record label. Shenale was brought into the project as a string arranger after that incident creating the required sonic style. Tori Amos wanted to experiment around the piano and keyboards in order to change its inherent character and work around new but hand-made sounds. Eric Rosse and John Philip Shenale worked for two days to detune and reconstruct an old upright for "Bells For Her".

What that is, is Eric and Phil totally destroyed this upright piano, in a wonderful, wonderful way. They detuned the whole piano and then muted the three strings to a note. So they muted two strings out of three on the whole piano. They also put nails inside the piano and took silver balls - Chinese meditation balls - and rolled them down the strings of the Bösendorfer to record it. I didn't know what the sound was until we found it.

— Tori Amos

Their collaboration which transcends the unexpected use of music instruments creating a unique sound signature, has flourished with the use of string quartets and full orchestras. Their successful collaboration went on throughout numerous albums beyond Little Earthquakes (1992, programming, keyboard programming, musician) bringing Amos' sonic landscape into fruition with releases such as Winter (1992, mellotron), "Cornflake Girl" (1994, string arrangements, woodwind arrangement), Under the Pink (1994, strings, organ/hammond, string arrangements), certified platinum, alternative rock, baroque pop album Boys for Pele (1996, Atlantic, arranger) which was nominated for a Grammy Award for Best Alternative Music Performance and her certified platinum, art rock, art pop, trip hop album From the Choirgirl Hotel (1998, Atlantic, string arrangements) which was nominated for two Grammy Awards (Album for Best Alternative Music Performance and the "Raspberry Swirl" track for Best Female Rock Vocal Performance). Boys for Pele peaked at No. 2 and From The Choirgirl Hotel peaked at No. 5 at Billboard's Top Album Sales.

He worked with American singer and songwriter Willy DeVille as his producer on four studio albums in total throughout the years. Their collaboration started with the roots rock, New Orleans R&B, Latin rock, Cajun, Tex-Mex, Mariachi album Backstreets of Desire (1992, FNAC, certified as gold album in France) and on the country, blues, Cajun, mariachi, R&B, soul album Loup Garou (1995, EastWest Gmbh). Hey! Joe came from the album Backstreets of Desire and peaked at No. 14 at French charts. Shenale did great work with DeVille out of his North Hollywood compound, with albums that maintained DeVille's career in Europe in a major way, as he had, in all practicality, given up on his American career. According to Willy DeVille, John Philip Shenale always heard the sound Willy wanted to create and he knew how to bring out the best in him in the studio as a producer:

Making an album is like giving birth in a lot of ways. You have this creation that you 're responsible for and it's a wonderful feeling when it's done but there's the struggle that you go through to make sure that you bring the sound to life in just the right way. That's what Phil does you know. Because he knows what I want to create - he comes up with ideas that help make the sound right. There was this one song - it was Backstreets Of Desire I think, where he took a baby grand piano - a really good one, right, and took the lid off and played on the wires with drum sticks because he knew that was the way to get the sound we needed for the song. He doesn't say, this is what it has to sound like, or make it into his sound. It's all about finding the sound - or really knowing what I'm hearing inside my head almost, and helping me make it happen.

— Willy DeVille

He worked with American singer and actress Diana Ross on her four-CD box set pop, soul, disco album Forever Diana: Musical Memoirs (1993, Motown, musician).

Shenale worked with Santana for their Latin Rock, hard rock albums Milagro (1992, Polydor, string programming) and Milagro/Sacred Fire (2002, string programming). The song Gypsy/Grajonca which was included in the album Milagro was nominated for a Grammy Award for Best Rock Instrumental Performance.

He worked with The Indians on the alternative rock album Indianism (1992, Polydor, keyboards) and with American singer and songwriter Vincent Rocco on his pop, rock, folk album Hell Or Highwater (1992, Elektra, musician).

He worked with American singer-songwriter and poet Zachary Richard on his rock, folk, world & country album Snake Bite Love (1992, A&M, keyboards).

In 1993 he collaborated with American blues guitarist and singer Buddy Guy on the Feels Like Rain album (1993, Silverstone, organ, synthesizer) which won a Grammy Award for Best Contemporary Blues Album.

He worked with American singer-songwriter E (a.k.a. Mark Oliver Everett) on his pop, alternative/indie rock album Broken Toy Shop (1993, Polydor, co-arranger, co-orchestrator).

Shenale worked with Australian singer, songwriter Diesel on his certified multiplatinum, pop rock, soul album Hepfidelity (1992, Mushroom, keyboards, percussion, string arrangements, assistant engineer, assistant, keyboard arrangements, percussion arrangement, overdub assistant) which peaked at No. 1 on the ARIA Albums chart and stayed there for four weeks and on his album Johnny Diesel & Injectors/Hepfidelity (2005, keyboards, percussion, string arrangements, assistant). The song "Tip Of My Tongue" (1992) peaked at No. 4 in Australia and in No. 3 in New Zealand and was nominated for ARIA Award for the single of the year. "Man Alive" (1991, Chrysalis, peaked at No. 20), "One More Time" (1992, Chrysalis/EMI, peaked at No. 59), "Love Junk" (1991, Chrysalis, peaked at No. 19) and "Come to Me" (1991, Chrysalis/EMI, peaked at No. 8). Diesel described his collaboration with Shenale as being a kid in a musical candy store.

It was in that city that I got to work with maestro Phil Shenale on the under currents: the loops, pads, whistles, and bells from the sessions. We’d spend hours every morning mapping out what I was hearing in my head, with Phil bringing something to the studio for us to record on later in the day. That was always an exciting time: I was a kid in a musical candy store.

— Diesel

He has collaborated with American actress and singer Katey Sagal for her adult contemporary album Well... (1994, Virgin, keyboards, orchestrations) and the alternative rock band Love Spit Love on its debut alternative rock album Love Spit Love (1994, Imago, string arrangements).

He worked with American rapper, DJ and producer Warren G. on his debut certified three time platinum West Coast Hip-Hop, G-funk studio album Regulate... G Funk Era (1994, Def Jam, editing). "Regulate" reached No. 2 on the US Billboard Hot 100 and No. 8 on the R&B/Hip-Hop Chart.

John Philip Shenale contributed as a musician to the album Tribute to Edith Piaf, [Amherst], a French singer, lyricist and actress (1994, drums).

He worked with American actress, musician and author Tanya Blount on her hip hop, funk, soul album Natural Thing (1994, Motown, keyboards) which peaked at No. 58 on the Billboard Top R&B Albums chart and with the female duo Kindred Spirit, consisting of Debbi Peterson (drummer/vocalist of The Bangles) and Siobhan Maher (vocalist of the River City People) on their debut rock, folk, world & country album Kindred Spirit (1995, IRS, keyboards).

John Philip Shenale worked with American singer-songwriter Tracy Chapman on her multiplatinum folk, blues, rock album New Beginning (1995, Elektra, keyboards), "Give Me One Reason" (1996, keyboards) won a Grammy Award for Best Rock Song while the album was nominated for four Grammy Awards (Best Female Rock Vocal Performance, Record Of The Year/New Beginning, Best Pop Album/New Beginning, "Give Me One Reason" Song of the Year) and peaked at No. 3 on Billboard Hot 100.

He teamed up with Australian soft rock duo Air Supply on the soft rock album News from Nowhere (1995, Giant, arranger, strings), the soft rock, adult contemporary album The Book of Love (1997, Giant, strings, keyboards) and the soft rock album Across the Concrete Sky (2003, Avex Trax, string arrangements).

He has collaborated with Gus for his alternative rock, pop albums Gus (1996, mellotron, string arrangements) and Word of Mouth Parade (1999, mixing, keyboards). He worked with Celestial Winds for the jazz album Bliss (1996, Universe Music, Keyboards, bass) and with Rust on the alternative rock album Bar Chord Ritual (1996, sounds).

John Philip Shenale worked with Uma on her rock, pop, folk, world & country album Fare Well (1997, Refuge, percussion, programming) and with the American pianist, singer-songwriter Vladimir John Ondrasik III also known by his stage name Five for Fighting on his soft rock, pop album Message for Albert (1997, EMI, arranger, string arrangements).

He worked with American singer, actress, comedian and author Bette Midler on her Bathhouse Betty certified gold, pop album (1998, Sony, arranger, piano, keyboards) and with the American rock singer and musician Eric Martin on his Somewhere in the Middle album (1998, WEA, Chamberlin, organ/Hammond).

He has collaborated with French rapper MC Solaar on his certified twice gold, rap album Le Tour De La Question (1998, EastWest, assistant), with the Canadian singer-songwriter Adam Cohen on his Adam Cohen album (1998, Sony, ARP synthesizer, organ/Hammond, string arrangements) and with the American singer-songwriter John Hiatt on his certified gold folk rock, pop rock album The Best of John Hiatt (1998, Capital, loop).

Shenale worked with American jazz singer Curtis Stigers on his jazz, rock, blues, pop album To Be Loved (1999, string arrangements) and on his jazz, rock, blues, pop album Brighter Days (1999, Columbia, piano, mellotron, samples).

He worked with English rock band Smokie on their pop, rock album The Best of 20 Years (1999, composer) and with Swimmer on her album Surreal (1999, Matador, string arranger).

=== 2000–2009 ===
He worked with Tracy Chapman on Collection, a certified multiplatinum folk rock, alternative rock, blues rock album (2001, Warner, keyboards).

He collaborated with the American rock band The Beach Boys on their soft rock albums Keepin' the Summer Alive/The Beach Boys '85 (2000, Oberheim synthesizer) and M.I.U. Album/L.A. (Light Album) (2000, Oberheim synthesizer).

John Philip Shenale collaborated with Tori Amos on her alternative rock, concept album Strange Little Girls (2001, Atlantic, arranger, strings, synthesizer) which was nominated for two Grammy Awards (Best Alternative Music Album and Best Female Rock Vocal Performance), on the certified gold, alternative rock album Scarlet's Walk (2002, Epic, flute, string arrangements), on the certified silver album Tales of a Librarian: A Tori Amos Collection (2003, Atlantic, audio production, main personnel, strings, piano, piano (electric), Wurlitzer piano, chord organ, Wurlitzer, Chamberlin, synthesizer, ARP synthesizer, percussion, loops, sampling, organ/Hammond, assistant, Marxophone, string ensemble), on the album A Piano: The Collection (2006, Rhino, flute, programming, string arrangements), on alternative rock, country rock, soft rock album American Doll Posse (2007, Epic, string arrangements, brass arrangement, string conductor, brass conductor), on the certified gold, alternative rock album Abnormally Attracted to Sin (2009, arranger, conductor, synthesizer, organ/Hammond, orchestration, string arrangements, Hammond B3), and on the Christmas, traditional album Midwinter Graces (2009, Universal, conductor, synthesizer, sampling, string arrangements, brass arrangement). Strange Little Girls peaked at No. 4, Scarlet's Walk peaked at No. 7, Abnormally Attracted to Sin peaked at No.9 and Tales of A Librarian peaked at No.40 at Billboard 200. In 2011 Tori Amos went on the Night of Hunters tour, a world concert tour which was supported by the Apollon Musagète Quartet. The songs she performed were rearranged by Shenale to accommodate the string quartet. Rolling Stone Magazine wrote that the new arrangements provided subtle texture and unlikely rhythmic flourish to numbers "Suede" and "Cruel" while casting the strong melody of her Boys For Pele ballad "Hey Jupiter" in a new light

Shenale worked with Willy DeVille as a producer on two of DeVille's roots rock, New Orleans R&B, Tex-Mex, blues rock, Latin rock albums; Crow Jane Alley (2004, Eagle), and Pistola (2008, Eagle), which was widely hailed as one of DeVille's best albums. Crow Jane Alley peaked at No. 163 at Top Albums France and Pistola peaked at No. 189. He worked with him once more as a musician this time, on his album Introducing Willy DeVille (2009, wurlitzer).

He worked with the Canadian singer-songwriter Jann Arden on the certified gold, adult alternative album Blood Red Cherry (2000, Universal, keyboards, drum loop) and on the certified platinum, adult alternative album Greatest Hurts: The Best of Jann Arden (2001, keyboards, drum loop).

John Philip Shenale worked with English guitarist and producer Chris Spedding on his rock, electric blues album One Step Ahead of The Blues (2002, Music Avenue, drums).

He played Oberheim synthesizers for California Feelin' which was included in the rock album Classics Selected by Brian Wilson (2002, Capitol, musician).

He collaborated with Wendy MaHarry on her folk, world & country album Released (2003, producer, arranger, engineer, strings).

He worked with the punk, rock band MxPx on their album Before Everything & After which peaked at No. 51 on the Billboard 200 (2003, A&M records, keyboards, string arrangements).

He worked with Katey Sagal on her pop, adult contemporary album Room (2004, Valley-Entertainment, organ, keyboards, sampling, string arrangements) and with the American actor and singer Jesse McCartney on his certified platinum, pop, pop rock, teen pop, R&B album Beautiful Soul (2004, Hollywood Records, keyboards).

Shenale worked with David Young on his albums Beyond... Celestial Winds (2004, engineer, piano organ, keyboards, bass) and Woodstock: The Mystery of Destiny (2007, engineer, keyboards).

He worked with Curtis Stigers on his pop, rock album Best of 1991-1999 (2005, Sony, piano, arranger).

He collaborated with Eileen Carey for her pop, rock album Hearts of Time (2006, composer) and with Evelio on the pop, rock album Evelio (2006, producer, composer, mixing, Fender Rhodes, Wurlitzer, Chamberlin, keyboards, horn arrangements, string arrangements, loop).

He worked with the French singer and actress Sylvie Vartan on her pop, rock album Nouvelle Vague on which she re-interprets some old classics (2007, Mercury, producer, engineer, arranger, guitar, flute, piano, Fender Rhodes, Farfisa organ, Wurlitzer, Chamberlin organ/Hammond, clavier, Clavecin).

John Philip worked with William MacGregor on his pop, rock album Welcome to Carnival (2007, Beggars Banquet, Jimmy Boy, keyboards) and with the French singer and actor Marc Lavoine for his pop, rock album Best of Solo (2007, RCA, synthesizer).

=== 2010–2019 ===
Shenale was Tori Amos' orchestral collaborator on the classical crossover album Night of Hunters which was released by the classical label Deutsche Grammophon. The album marked their twentieth anniversary of their long-time collaboration which began with her solo debut, Little Earthquakes (1992). Their collaboration was celebrated with eight Grammy Awards nominations throughout the years. Shenale's string arrangements are the most noticeable sonic advancement since he brought the use of real strings in Tori Amos' music. His involvement on the album Night of Hunters (2011, string arrangements, woodwind arrangement) exhibits some of his most daring and absorbing work to date. In 2011 Deutsche Grammophon released Sin Palabras (Without Words), the instrumental companion to Tori Amos' record Night of Hunters, a rock, pop, classical, folk, world & country album. John Philip Shenale composed all the orchestral arrangements for that record, merging the pop and classical worlds while still maintaining a decisive stylistic motif. Sin Palabras album stripped away Amos' vocals and replaced the parts she plays with The Apollon Musagete Quartet and the Berlin Philharmonic clarinet soloist Andreas Ottensamer, as the forefront. The album Night of Hunters simultaneously landed on Billboard's Classical, Alternative and Rock Charts all in the Top 10 and went on to win the 2012 ECHO Klassik Award. Their collaboration continued on her alternative rock, baroque pop album Gold Dust (2012, Mercury Classics, orchestral arrangements, reworking), on the electronic, pop single Flavor (2012, Universal, arranger, orchestration), the soundtrack album The Light Princess, Original Cast Recording (2015, Universal, orchestration) and on her pop, rock album Native Invader (2017, Decca, keyboards, synthesizer, programming, Reindeer King/Freeman string symphonizer).

He has worked with Addie Brik on the pop, rock album Brik & Shenale (2012, composer).

John Philip Shenale worked again with Katey Sagal on her rock, pop, folk, world, and country album Covered (2013, organ, piano, string arrangements, synthesizer horn). As a member of the roots rock band The Forest Rangers they have worked together releasing songs from the soundtracks of the drama television series Sons of Anarchy and Mayans M.C. Releasing four studio albums, three EPs and numerous singles. They used the name The Reluctant Apostles for their live shows.

He worked with Zwerg on his electronic album Dual Citizen (2014, producer, arranger, keyboards, bass) and Katya on her album Rock Lives, Deluxe Edition (2015, composer) and Bruce Burton on his album On The Avenue (2015, producer).

He teamed up with American producer, drummer and guitarist Michael Marquart for albums with his project A Bad Think, The Tragic End of a Dreamer (2016, Windmark, keyboards) and Savior (2019, Windmark, keyboards) which was nominated for a Grammy Award for Best Immersive Audio Album.

John Philip Shenale worked with French singer-songwriter Michel Polnareff on pop album, Olympia (2016, Universal, arranger) and worked with Elouise on the folk, world & country album Deep Water (2016, Not On Label, composer, instrumentation, string arrangements).

He collaborated with Marta Woodhull on the pop album Face (2017, Bitches Britches, producer, composer, brass, Chamberlin, clavinet, drum loop, drum mix, engineer, guitar, guitar (synthesizer), guitar loops, Hammond B3, Harpsichord, keyboards, mellotron, mixing, organ/Hammond, soloist, synthesizer, vocals/background, Wurlitzer piano).

Shenale worked with Kris Kelly on his folk, world & country album Runaways (2019, string arrangements, brass arrangement, woodwind arrangements, keyboards) and with Ralph Molina, best known as the drummer for Neil Young's backing band Crazy Horse, on his folk, world & country album Love and Inspiration (2019, Vapor Records, arranger, keyboards, mixer).

=== 2020-present ===
Shenale worked with Tori Amos on her alternative rock, chamber pop, pop rock album Ocean to Ocean (2021, Decca, keyboards, organ/Hammond, recording) during the global COVID-19 pandemic despite the fact that she was in Cornwall, England and he was in Los Angeles. The album debuted at No. 6 on Billboard's Top Album Sales.

He worked with Purring Squirrels, musician, on their album Purring Squirrels (2021, mixing, synthesizer, bass).

He collaborated again with Michael Marquart / A Bad Think on his rock albums Lifelike (2021, Windmark, keyboards) and X (2022, Windmark, keyboards).

== Career in film, TV, theater, and other works ==
Shenale's work has also been featured on films and musicals by directors such as Curtis Hanson, John Hughes, Carl Reiner, Herbert Ross, Walter Hill, Richard Lester, Brian Yuzna, Steve Miner, Paul Verhoeven, Frank Oz, Marianne Elliott.

His work includes: animated television series Alvin & the Chipmunks (1983, writer: Pump, Pump, Pump), comedy Losin' it directed by Curtis Hunson (1983, writer of theme song "Losin' It"), Janet Jackson music video, Dream Street directed by Debbie Allen (1984, composer), the American musical drama film Footloose, directed by Herbert Ross and its homonym soundtrack album Footloose [Original Motion Picture Soundtrack] with the song "Holding Out For A Hero" (1984, synthesizer, programming), the film The Dirt Bike Kid directed by Hoite C. Caston (1985, composer), the certified silver soundtrack album of the horror comedy music film Little Shop of Horrors directed by Frank Oz (1986, musician: synthesizer – uncredited), the action film Steele Justice, starring Martin Kove and directed by Robert Boris (1987, score), the teen comedy film License to Drive directed by Greg Beeman (1988, writer: Sweet Surrender), the film Teenage Mutant Ninja Turtles: Coming out of Their Shells (1989, keyboards, programming) which was followed by a studio album and a subsequent live musical tour that occurred from 1990 to 1991 while in 1992 it toured overseas. John Philip Shenale worked on the film Emperor of the Bronx directed by Joseph Merhi (1990, producer: After the Rain & Zing Zang, composer: After the Rain, Personality, Zing Zang), the horror comedy film Return of the Living Dead III directed by Brian Yuzna and written by John Penney (1993, composer, orchestrator), the comedy film The Waiting Game (1999, Royal Macadamians, Haus Buoy), the film Smart House starring Katey Sagal, directed by LaVar Burton (1999, performer: The House is Jumpin), the action drama film Out of Line written and directed by Johanna Demetrakas (2001, composer), the television adventure movie The Diamond of Jeru which was based on a story by Louis L'Amour starring Billy Zane and directed by Ian Barry and Dick Lowry (2001, composer).

He has worked for the French television talent show Star Academy on the album Star Academy 5, Star Academy 5: Les Meilleurs Moments (2005, sampling, clavier, rhythm, string arrangements).

He composed the musical score for the dramatized audiobook of the novel Son of a Wanted Man by Louis L' Amour (2005, composer).

John Philip Shenale is a member of the roots rock band The Forest Rangers mostly known as the house band of FX action drama television series Sons of Anarchy (2008–2014) along with the musicians Bob Thiele Jr., Greg Leisz (pedal steel guitar), Matt Chamberlain (drums), Gia Ciambotti (background vocals). Bob Thiele Jr. was nominated three times for an Emmy Award for the songs he wrote for Sons of Anarchy and were performed by The Forest Rangers ("This Life"/2009, "Day is Gone"/2014, "Come Join The Murder"/2015). Their work was released as four soundtrack rock albums (Songs of Anarchy: Music from Sons of Anarchy Seasons 1–4 (2011, Columbia), Sons of Anarchy: Songs of Anarchy Vol. 2 (2012, Columbia), Sons of Anarchy: Songs of Anarchy Vol. 3 (2013, Columbia), Sons of Anarchy: Songs of Anarchy Vol. 4) (2015, Columbia), 3 EPs (Sons of Anarchy: North County, 2009, 20th Century Fox TV Records, Sons of Anarchy: Shelter, 2009, 20th Century Fox TV Records and Sons of Anarchy: The King is Gone, 2010, 20th Century For TV Records), numerous singles and a debut album called Land Ho! (2016, Valley Entertainment). The Forest Rangers launched a PledgeMusic campaign to record and release it and Bob Thiele Jr. called it "a passion project". In 2018 The Forest Rangers contributed to the Mayans M.C. soundtrack with the song "Black is Black". The band occasionally used the name The Reluctant Apostles for their live performances with Katey Sagal as their lead singer. According to a Reddit thread entitled "Damn the soundtrack is great", a number of Sons of Anarchy fans thoroughly enjoyed the show's music and a plethora of fans praised The Forest Rangers, in particular, for lending their talents to the majority of the tracks, which are effectively placed in the show. The song "Come Join The Murder" debuted at No. 9 on Billboard's Hot Rock Chart while the title song "This Life" started at No. 93 on the Billboard Hot 100.

Many songs Shenale has worked on over the years featured in television series such as "Pretty Good Year" (Casual, Season 3 Episode 12, 2015) and "Bells For Her" (Yellowjackets, Season 2, Episode 3, 2023).

He worked with Bob Thiele Jr. on the science fiction, thriller television series Alcatraz (2012, musician), produced by J.J. Abrams and the crime drama television series Chance (2016–2017, musician) which was based on the book Chance by Kem Nunn.

He was the orchestrator of The Light Princess, a musical with music and lyrics by Tori Amos which was directed by Marianne Elliott and premiered at the Royal National Theatre, London in 2013. The story was based on a Victorian fairytale by George MacDonald contemplating the need for balance between gravity and levity and that there can be no true happiness without knowing sadness as well. The Light Princess is a dark fairytale about grief, rebellion and the power of love. The Light Princess was nominated for the Best New Musical award at 2014 WhatsOnStage Awards and got six nominations in total. Rosalie Craig who played the lead role of princess Althea was nominated for an Olivier Award and won the Evening Standard Award for Best Musical Performance. The theatrical play was followed up with the commercial music release of The Light Princess (Original Cast Recording) album.

In 2021 he worked as an arranger (Marianne, Tori Amos) on the short music film The Big Crying. Marco Goecke, German choreographer and director of the film was inspired by the death of his father. The story was written by Marco Goecke and Nadja Kadel and nineteen dancers brought his vision to life in a piece about parting and about everything that we have to burn. The short film was nominated for a Zwaan Award for Best Dance Production 2021 at the Nederlandse Dansdagen, Dutch Dance Festival. The film was followed by live performances at Nederlands Dans Theater, NDT in 2022 while the world premiere was in Hague on March 18, 2021.

== Appearances in film documentaries ==
Shenale appeared in Samantha Hale's documentary series Map the Music (2010) and talked about creating emotion through sound. The documentary explored the connection between music and love by interviewing artists and people from different backgrounds.

John Philip Shenale appeared in Lifelike: The Making of an Album in Dolby Atmos (2021), an official documentary by Derrick Borte focusing on behind-the-scenes with musicians (Jeremy Stacey/drummer, Sean Hurley/bassist, Fernando Perdonno/guitarist, Kirk Hellie/guitarist) as they bring Michael Marquart's album Lifelike to life).

John Philip Shenale appeared in the documentary Heaven Stood Still: The Incarnations of Willy DeVille (2022) which was directed by Larry Locke and portraits the life and music of Willy DeVille. He talked about their work together as his producer on four albums. Their collaboration began with Backstreets of Desire thanks to Shenale's understanding of DeVille's vision, storytelling and his colorful, film-oriented material. He helped him reinvent himself and explore the fusion of American style roots and Hispanic roots in the Southwest. He embraced DeVille's ability to find the character in the song and then turn into that character by using his versatile voice while serving as a producer.

== Music credits ==
John Philip Shenale's music credits include those of producer, composer, arranger, conductor, orchestration and string arrangements.

| Credit | Album (Year, Artist) |
|---|---|
| Producer | Backstreets of Desire (1994, Willy DeVille), Loup Garou (1996, Willy DeVille), Love & Emotion: Atlantic Years (2001, Willy DeVille), Released (2003, Wendy MaHarry), Crow Jane Alley (2004, Willy DeVille), Evelio (2006, Evelio), Crow Jane Alley/Pistola (2013, Willy DeVille), Face (2017, Marta Woodhull) |
| Arranger | Dream Street (1984, Janet Jackson), Everything (1988, Bangles), News from Nowhere (1995, Air Supply), Boys for Pele (1996, Tori Amos), Message for Albert (1997, Five for Fighting), Bathhouse Betty (1998, Bette Midler), To Venus and Back (1999, Tori Amos), Strange Little Girls (2001, Tori Amos), Tales of a Librarian: A Tori Amos Collection (2003, Tori Amos), Nouvelle Vague (2007, Sylvie Vartan), Abnormally Attracted to Sin (2009, Tori Amos), Olympia 2016 (2016, Michel Polnareff) |
| String Arrangements | Living in Oz (1983, Rick Springfield), Soul Deep (1991, Jimmy Barnes), Hepfidelity (1993, Diesel), Cornflake Girl (1994, Tori Amos), Flesh and Wood (1994, Jimmy Barnes), Under the Pink (1994, Tori Amos), Gus (1996, Gus), Hits (1996, Jimmy Barnes), Adam Cohen (1998, Adam Cohen), From the Choirgirl Hotel (1998, Tori Amos), To Be Loved (1999, Curtis Stigers), Scarlet's Walk (2002, Tori Amos), Across the Concrete Sky (2003, Air Supply), Room (2004, Katey Sagal), Johnny Diesel & the Injectors/Hepfidelity (2005, Diesel), A Piano: The Collection (2006, Tori Amos), JB50 (2006, Jimmy Barnes), American Doll Posse (2007, Tori Amos), Night of Hunters (2011, Tori Amos), Deep Water (2016, Elouise), Runaways (2019, Kris Kelly) |
| Conductor | American Doll Posse (2007, Tori Amos), Abnormally Attracted to Sin (2009, Tori Amos), Midwinter Graces (2009, Tori Amos) |
| Orchestration | Well... (1994, Katey Sagal), Abnormally Attracted to Sin (2009, Tori Amos), The Light Princess [Original Cast Recording] (2015, Tori Amos) |
| Composer | Dream Street (1984, Janet Jackson), The Dirt Bike Kid (1985, film), Steele Justice (1987, film), Busman's Holiday (1991, John Kilzer), Raindogs (1991, Raindogs), Return of the Living Dead 3 (1994, film) Barry Goldberg/John Philip Shenale, The Best of 20 Years (1999, Smokie), The Diamond of Jeru (2001, film), Son of a Wanted Man by Louis L'Amour, dramatized (2005, audiobook), Evelio (2006, Evelio), Hearts of Time (Eileen Carey), Deep Water (2016, Elouise), Face (2017, Marta Woodhull) |
| Band member of The Forest Rangers | Sons of Anarchy: North Country-EP (2009), Sons of Anarchy: Shelter (2009), Sons of Anarchy: The King Is Gone (2010), Songs of Anarchy: Music from Sons of Anarchy Seasons 1–4 (2011, Various Artists), Sons of Anarchy: Songs of Anarchy Vol. 2 (2012, Various Artists), Covered (2013, Katey Sagal), Sons of Anarchy: Songs of Anarchy Vol. 3, Sons of Anarchy: Songs of Anarchy Vol. 4 (2015, Various Artists), Land Ho! (2015), Black is Black, Mayans M.C. (2019, Katey Sagal) |
