= The Light Princess (Original Cast Recording) =

Soundtrack album by Various artists
- Released: October 9, 2015
- Recorded: 2014–2015
- Studio: Martian Engineering (Cornwall); British Grove Studios (London)
- Length: 126:27
- Label: Universal/Mercury Classics
- Producer: Tori Amos

The Light Princess (Original Cast Recording) is the commercial music release from the stage adaptation of the Scottish fairy tale by George MacDonald.

The Light Princess was the first stage musical to feature original compositions by singer-songwriter Tori Amos. The play debuted at London's Royal National Theatre on 9 October 2013 with music and lyrics by Amos, book and lyrics by Australian playwright Samuel Adamson and orchestrations by John Philip Shenale.

The story centres around teenage princess Althea of Lagobel, who lost gravity when refusing to mourn over her mother’s death and is therefore bound to float above ground. When war breaks out Althea, pushed by her father to come to ground and take responsibility, flees only to fall in love with the rivalling kingdoms prince.

The musical opened to positive reviews in September 2013, starring Rosalie Craig in the title role, subsequently singled out as a stand-out performance. Craig was nominated for many awards, and ultimately won the Evening Standard's award for best actress in a musical. The choreography, lighting, set design, music (Amos) and other cast performances were also lauded and nominated for a range of awards. In 2014, Amos stated that the production team had ambitions of bringing The Light Princess to American Broadway, but expressed worry that the original National Theatre production might not be commercial enough for the American audience.

The Original Cast Recording features 30 original recordings by the cast plus three bonus tracks, including two performed by Amos.

An early incarnation of the song "Coronation" appeared on Tori Amos's seasonal album Midwinter Graces in 2009. Then known as "Winter's Carol", much of the song's core melody remains the same as the version that would become "Coronation". In its place as the closing number of The Light Princess, the lyrics, structure and arrangements have been almost completely re-written, though some lyrical content remains similar to "Winter's Carol".

== Track listing ==
The Light Princess - A Musical by Tori Amos and Samuel Adamson (Original Cast Recording) (disc 1)
No.	Title	Performer(s)	Length
1.	"Prologue: Once Upon A Time"	Amy Booth-Steel, Kane Oliver Parry, Eve Blue Elliott-Sidi, Connor Fitzgerald, The Light Princess Company	3:39
2.	"My Own Land"	Amy Booth-Steel, Clive Rowe, David Langham, Hal Fowler, Kane Oliver Parry, Landi Oshinowo, Laura Pitt-Pulford, Malinda Parris, Nick Hendrix, Rosalie Craig And The Light Princess Company	7:28
3.	"My Fairy Story"	Rosalie Craig & Amy Booth-Steel	4:52
4.	"Queen Material"	Rosalie Craig, Amy Booth-Steel, Clive Rowe, Malinda Parris, Adam Pearce, The Light Princess Company	9:58
5.	"Sealand Supremacy"	Rosalie Craig, Nick Hendrix, Amy Booth-Steel, Kane Oliver Parry, Laura Pitt-Pulford, The Light Princess Company	3:38
6.	"Zephyrus Call & Levity"	Rosalie Craig & Nick Hendrix	3:00
7.	"Althea"	Rosalie Craig & Nick Hendrix	4:33
8.	"Scandal"	Malinda Parris & The Light Princess Company	1:44
9.	"The Gauntlet"	Clive Rowe, Malinda Parris, The Light Princess Company	1:29
10.	"Better than Good"	Rosalie Craig & The Light Princess Company	3:06
11.	"The Solution"	Rosalie Craig, Clive Rowe, Malinda Parris, David Langham, Adam Pearce, Caspar Phillipson, The Light Princess Company	6:15
12.	"Highness in the Sky"	Nick Hendrix	1:58
13.	"Proverbs & Let the Bells Ring & God, the Horror"	Nick Hendrix, Amy Booth-Steel, Clive Rowe, Hal Fowler, The Light Princess Company	3:11
14.	"No H2O"	Rosalie Craig & Amy Booth-Steel	5:18
15.	"Zephyrus Call Reprise"	Nick Hendrix	1:07
16.	"Darkest Hour"	Rosalie Craig	4:14
17.	"After Darkest Hour"	Rosalie Craig & Nick Hendrix	1:33

The Light Princess - A Musical by Tori Amos and Samuel Adamson (Original Cast Recording) (disc 2)
No.	Title	Performer(s)	Length
1.	"Amphibiava"	Rosalie Craig & Nick Hendrix	4:32
2.	"Tinkle, Drizzle, Bubble, and Gush"	Rosalie Craig, Amy Booth-Steel, Kane Oliver Parry, Clive Rowe, Hal Fowler, Laura Pitt-Pulford, Malinda Parris, Vivien Carter, Jamie Muscato	2:38
3.	"Nothing More Than This, Part One"	Rosalie Craig, Nick Hendrix, Kane Oliver Parry	5:23
4.	"Part Two: Queen of the Lake"	Rosalie Craig & Amy Booth-Steel	3:18
5.	"Drought"	David Langham, Adam Pearce, The Light Princess Company	1:44
6.	"The Whistleblower"	Amy Booth-Steel, Clive Rowe, Malinda Parris, James Charlton, The Light Princess Company	5:45
7.	"My LIttle Girl's Smile"	Amy Booth-Steel, Clive Rowe, Malinda Parris	3:43
8.	"Bitter Fate"	Nick Hendrix, Kane Oliver Parry, Hal Fowler	2:51
9.	"The Wedding"	Rosalie Craig, Nick Hendrix, Amy Booth-Steel, Kane Oliver Parry, Clive Rowe, Hal Fowler, Laura Pitt-Pulford, Malinda Parris, The Light Princess Company	4:35
10.	"Crash in the Universe"	Rosalie Craig, Nick Hendrix, Amy Booth-Steel, Kane Oliver Parry, Laura Pitt-Pulford, Malinda Parris, The Light Princess Company	5:33
11.	"Tears"	Rosalie Craig	3:39
12.	"Gravity & Epilogue: Once Upon a Time"	Rosalie Craig, Nick Hendrix, Amy Booth-Steel, Kane Oliver Parry	3:33
13.	"Coronation"	Rosalie Craig, Nick Hendrix, Amy Booth-Steel, Kane Oliver Parry, Laura Pitt-Pulford, Malinda Parris, The Light Princess Company	3:10
14.	"Gravity (Bonus Track)"	Rosalie Craig & Nick Hendrix	2:00
15.	"Highness in the Sky (Bonus Track)"	Tori Amos	3:25
16.	"Darkest Hour (Bonus Track)"	Tori Amos	3:36

== Charts ==
Chart (2015)	Peak position
Australia (ARIA)	866
