= 2014 WhatsOnStage Awards =

British theatre awards

The WhatsOnStage Awards, founded in 2001 as the Theatregoers' Choice Awards, are a fan-driven set of awards organised by the theatre website WhatsOnStage.com, based on a popular vote recognising performers and productions of English theatre, with an emphasis on London's West End theatre.

The 2014 Whatsonstage Award winners and nominees were:

Best New Play	Best New Musical
The Audience; Chimerica; The Events; The Herd; Peter and Alice	The Book of Mormon; Charlie and the Chocolate Factory; From Here to Eternity; The Light Princess; Once
Best Play Revival	Best Musical Revival
To Kill a Mockingbird; Mojo; The Pride; Private Lives; The Weir	The Sound of Music; Candide; Chess; A Chorus Line; Merrily We Roll Along
Best Actor in a Play	Best Actress in a Play
Daniel Radcliffe – The Cripple of Inishmaan; Ben Whishaw – Peter and Alice; James McAvoy – Macbeth; Lenny Henry – Fences; Rory Kinnear – Othello	Helen Mirren – The Audience; Anne-Marie Duff – Strange Interlude; Hayley Atwell – The Pride; Suranne Jones – Beautiful Thing; Tanya Moodie – Fences
Best Actor in a Musical	Best Actress in a Musical
Gavin Creel – The Book of Mormon; Declan Bennett – Once; Douglas Hodge – Charlie and the Chocolate Factory; Killian Donnelly – The Commitments; Robert Lonsdale – From Here to Eternity	Scarlett Strallen – A Chorus Line and Candide; Charlotte Wakefield – The Sound of Music; Cynthia Erivo – The Color Purple; Rosalie Craig – The Light Princess; Zrinka Cvitešić – Once
Best Supporting Actor in a Play	Best Supporting Actress in a Play
David Walliams – A Midsummer Night's Dream; Charles Edwards – Strange Interlude; Daniel Mays – Trelawny of the Wells and Mojo; Kyle Soller – Edward II; Richard McCabe – The Audience	Haydn Gwynne – The Audience; Cecilia Noble – The Amen Corner; Claudie Blakley – Chimerica; Gillian Hanna and Ingrid Craigie – The Cripple of Inishmaan; Naomi Frederick – The Winslow Boy
Best Supporting Actor in a Musical	Best Supporting Actress in a Musical
Stephen Ashfield – The Book of Mormon; Colman Domingo – The Scottsboro Boys; James Dreyfus – Candide; Nigel Planer – Charlie and the Chocolate Factory; Ryan Sampson – From Here to Eternity	Alexia Khadime – The Book of Mormon; Amy Booth-Steel – The Light Princess; Iris Roberts – Charlie and the Chocolate Factory; Leigh Zimmerman – A Chorus Line; Sophia Nomvete – The Color Purple
Best Direction	Best Choreography
Michael Grandage – the Michael Grandage Season; Jamie Lloyd – Macbeth, The Hothouse and The Pride; John Tiffany – Once; Maria Friedman – Merrily We Roll Along; Nicholas Hytner – Othello	Peter Darling – Charlie and the Chocolate Factory; Casey Nicholaw – The Book of Mormon; Javier de Frutos – From Here to Eternity; Steven Hoggett – The Light Princess; Susan Stroman – The Scottsboro Boys
Best Set Design	Best Lighting Design
Mark Thompson – Charlie and the Chocolate Factory; Es Devlin – Chimerica; Felix Barrett, Livi Vaughan and Beatrice Minns – The Drowned Man; Rae Smith – The Light Princess; Tim Goodchild – Strangers on a Train	Adam Silverman – Macbeth; Paule Constable – the Michael Grandage Season; Peter Mumford – Ghosts; Philip Gladwell – Limbo; Tim Lutkin – Strangers on a Train
Best Original Music	Best London Newcomer of the Year
Once by Glen Hansard and Markéta Irglova; The Color Purple by Brenda Russell, Allee Willis and Stephen Bray; The Hush by Matthew Herbert; Lift by Craig Adams; The Scottsboro Boys by John Kander	Rupert Grint – Mojo; Jack Huston – Strangers on a Train; Kyle Scatliffe – The Scottsboro Boys; Olivia Vinall – Othello; Tori Amos – The Light Princess
Best Off-West End Production	Best Regional Production
Titanic – Southwark Playhouse; Adult Supervision – Park Theatre; #aiww: The Arrest of Ai Weiwei – Hampstead Theatre; Scenes from a Marriage – St. James Theatre; A Thousand Miles of History – Bussey Building	My Fair Lady – Sheffield Crucible; Macbeth – Manchester International Festival; The Prodigals – Belgrade, Coventry; Richard II – RSC at the Royal Shakespeare Theatre, Stratford-upon-Avon; To Sir, With Love – Royal & Derngate, Northampton
Best New Comedy	Best Shakespearean Production
The Play that Goes Wrong; Barking in Essex; Handbagged; Jeeves & Wooster in Perfect Nonsense; The Lyons	A Midsummer Night's Dream – Noël Coward Theatre; Julius Caesar – Donmar Warehouse; Macbeth – Trafalgar Studios; Othello – National Theatre, Olivier; The Tempest – Shakespeare's Globe
Best Takeover In A Role	Best West End Show
Carrie Hope Fletcher – Les Misérables; Beverley Knight – The Bodyguard; Geronimo Rauch – The Phantom of the Opera; Mike Noble – The Curious Incident of the Dog in the Night-Time; Willemijn Verkaik – Wicked	Matilda the Musical; Les Misérables; The Phantom of the Opera; War Horse; Wicked
Best Solo Performance	Best Ensemble Performance
Barry Humphries – Eat Pray Laugh! Barry Humphries’ Farewell Tour; Alex Jennings – Hymn; Cush Jumbo – Josephine & I; Leanne Best – The Match Box; Rob Crouch – Oliver Reed: Wild Thing	A Chorus Line; The Drowned Man; Handbagged; Titanic; The Weir
Theatre Event of the Year
The National Theatre's 50th anniversary gala, broadcast live on the BBC; The Lyric Hammersmith's Secret Theatre company season stars; The opening of the National's Shed as a temporary performance space; Punchdrunk's return to London with The Drowned Man
