= ARXX =

English musical duo

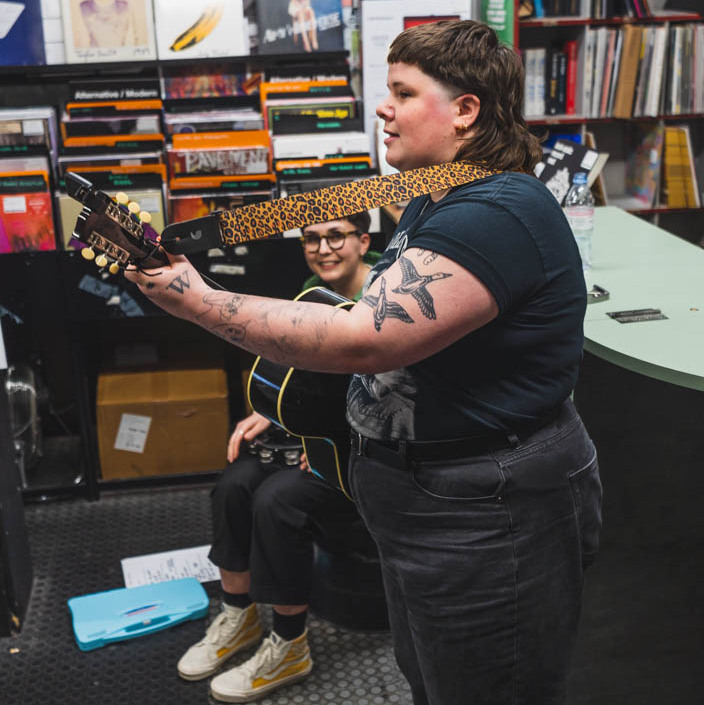
- Hanni Pidduck in front of Clara Townsend

Background information
- Genre: Alternative rock
- Years active: 2017–present
- Members: Hanni Pidduck; Clara Townsend
- Website: www.arxxband.com

Arxx (/ɑːrks/ ARKS, stylised ARXX) are a Brighton-based alternative rock band. Founded in 2017, ARXX consists of singer/guitarist Hanni Pidduck and drummer Clara Townsend. They supplied the key songs for the BBC drama Riot Women.

== History ==
Pidduck had lost their drummer when Townsend joined in 2017. Townsend later found out she was the only applicant to the advert. They had their first rehearsal at Brighton Electric which ended with setting ambitions for the band. Brighton Electric continued to be their base. They found friendship and a joint enthusiasm. They created their own European tour by contacting venues on Facebook and their bold approach worked.

Townsend has said that playing the drums makes her feel better and Pidduck says that song writing also helps their mental health. It allows them to get out feelings that have no other exit. They both had mental health issues when they were younger. They started out with a punk music sound and moved to a more pop sound as they released their first two albums.

In 2024 they released a single called "Crying in the Carwash" and they were chosen as emerging artists to appear on the BBC Introducing stage at the Glastonbury Festival. They shared the honour with Maya Lakhani.

== Riot Women ==
They answered a suspicious looking direct message that offered them "an opportunity" - expecting nothing. As a result, they submitted a demo tape to the leading playwright Sally Wainwright. It was well received. Wainwright would meet them when she would describe the story and the feelings of the five women who make up the fictional band Riot Women. Wainwright came to work with them at Brighton Electric and ARXX were invited to early read-throughs by the cast who had to learn the words to their songs. The Riot Women cast included Joanna Scanlan, Lorraine Ashbourne, Rosalie Craig, Tamsin Greig and Amelia Bullmore.

ARXX were recommended by the music journalist Amy Raphael. The creator and writer for the Riot Women series, Sally Wainwright, gave them some ideas for the song "Seeing Red". Wainwright later reported that "ARXX came back with by far the best version. They put so much into it and really made it their own. It's catchy and fabulous". One of the big challenges for ARXX was to keep their involvement secret for nine months.

They constructed other songs for the series including another that includes the line "I'm so depressed, I can't get dressed." which was suggested by the police adviser to the BBC production. Wainwright said that she learned how to play the drums while writing the series and she then used drumming to relieve her own tensions.

== Discography includes ==
- EPs:
  - Daughters of Daughters (2018)
  - Wrong Girl, Honey (2019)
- Albums:
  - Ride or Die (2023)
  - Good Boy (2024)
- Singles:
  - Work in Progress (2025)
