= Brighton Electric =

Coordinates: 50°50′19″N 0°7′24″W

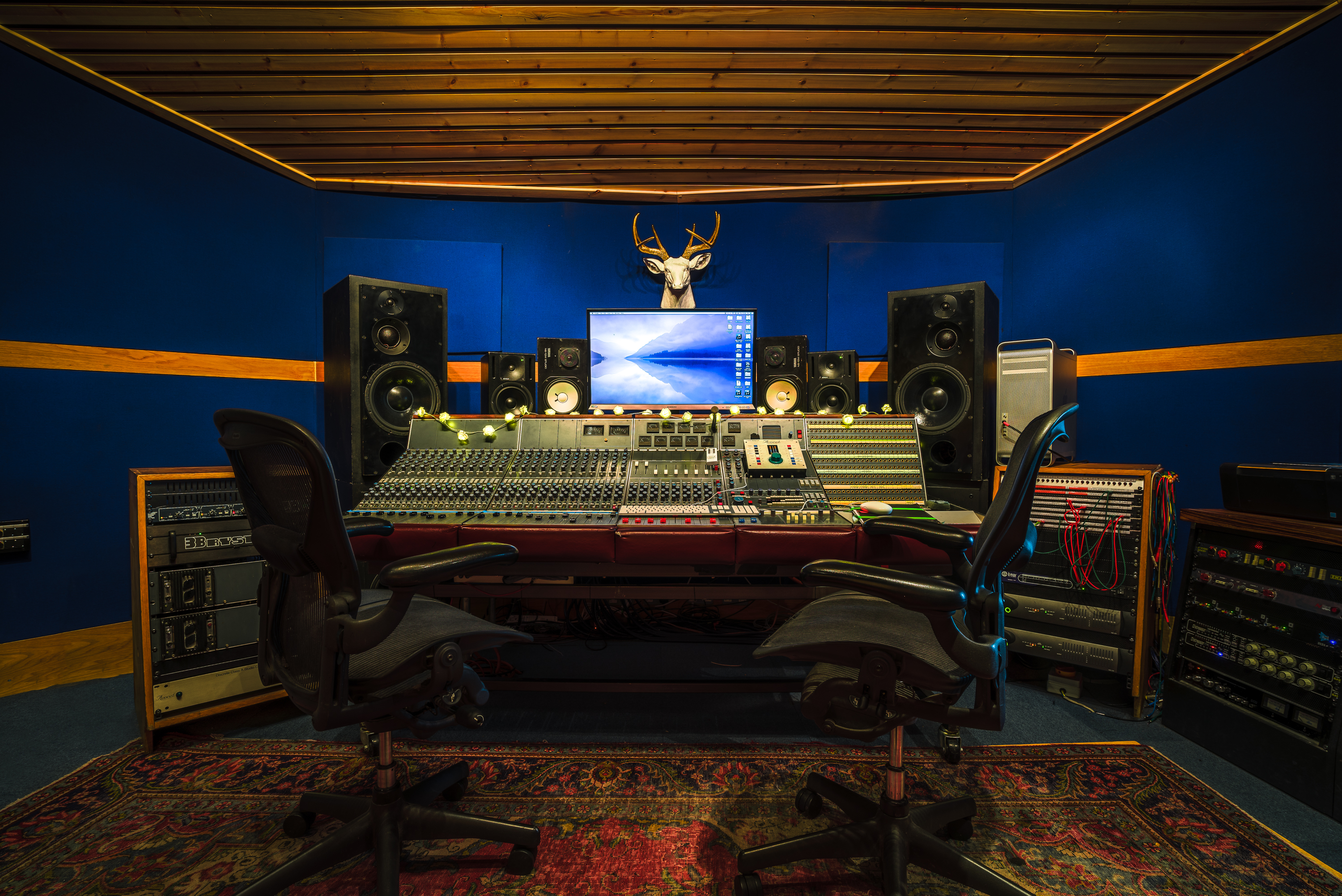
- Neve 5316, Studio 1
- Company type: Recording studio
- Industry: Music
- Founded: 2000; 26 years ago
- Website: www.brightonelectric.co.uk

Brighton Corporation Tramways headquarters
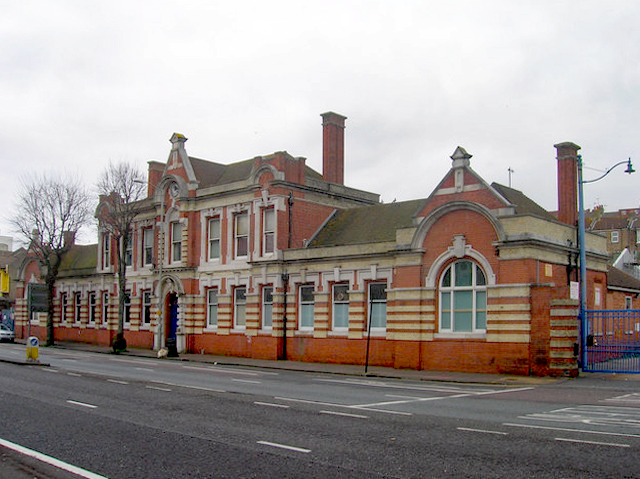
- Brighton Electric is in the former Brighton Corporation Tramways headquarters
- Interactive map of Brighton Corporation Tramways headquarters
- Built: 1897
- Architectural style: Early 20th century transport building

Brighton Electric is a music studio complex & bar venue in Brighton, UK, founded in 2000.

== Details ==
The main premises were built in 1897 as the Brighton Corporation Tramways head office, located on Coombe Terrace, Lewes Road.

The music studio complex was founded in 2000. It has 17 practice studios and 2 recording studios. There are several mix studios and a mastering suite, a 175-person-capacity live venue/production studio, storage facilities, a repair & music spares shop, vegan café, and a venue/bar.

In April 2010 the studio was shortlisted for the 'Studio of the Year' award by Music Week magazine. In 2016 Brighton Electric won the Pro Sound News 'Studio Of The Year' Award.

Musicians and bands that have recorded or rehearsed at Brighton Electric include: ARXX, John Cale, The Cure, Declan McKenna, Sea Power, Blood Red Shoes, Foals, The Go! Team, Laura Marling, Noisettes, The Maccabees, Royal Blood, Nick Cave, Slaves and Architects.
