= Riot Women =

British television series

- Genre: Drama
- Created by: Sally Wainwright
- Written by: Sally Wainwright
- Directed by: Sally Wainwright; Amanda Brotchie
- Starring: Rosalie Craig; Lorraine Ashbourne; Joanna Scanlan; Tamsin Greig; Amelia Bullmore
- Composers: ARXX; Ben Foster
- Country of origin: United Kingdom
- Original language: English
- No. of series: 1
- No. of episodes: 6

Production
- Executive producers: Roanna Benn; Jess O'Riordan; Tanya Qureshi; Robert Schildhouse; Sally Wainwright
- Cinematography: Simon Tindall; Angus Mitchell
- Editors: Anne Sopel; Mark Hermida
- Running time: 57 minutes
- Production company: Drama Republic

Original release
- Network: BBC One
- Release: 12 October 2025 – present

Riot Women is a British television series written by Sally Wainwright and produced by Drama Republic. The key songs were written by ARXX for the production. In November 2025, the BBC announced that Riot Women will return for a second series.

== Synopsis ==
Five women come together in Hebden Bridge to create a makeshift punk-rock band to enter a local talent contest but, in writing their first song, soon discover that they are all very angry about the way society treats women and that they have a lot to say. As they juggle demanding jobs, menopause, grown-up children, ageing parents, absent husbands, and disastrous dates and relationships, the band becomes a catalyst for change in their lives. The themes of the series include the power of friendship, music, and the resilience of women who refuse to be silenced by age or expectation. As the story progresses, it is more than music that binds them; a deeply potent, long-buried secret begins to surface – one that unexpectedly entangles Kitty and Beth, the two unlikely creative masterminds behind the band, in a complex triangle and threatens to tear everything apart. Nisha, one of the band's backing singers, experiences brutal misogynistic violence in the police force. Supporting one another, the band manages to continue playing, transforming their experiences into new songs.

== Background ==
The programme's name is a play on the riot grrrl movement.

== Cast and characters ==
- Joanna Scanlan as Beth Thornton
- Lorraine Ashbourne as Jess Burchill
- Rosalie Craig as Kitty Eckersley
- Tamsin Greig as Holly Gaskell
- Amelia Bullmore as Yvonne VauxGaskell
- Taj Atwal as Nisha Lal
- Ellise Chappell as Fearne
- Jonny Green as Tom Thornton
- Chandeep Uppal as Kam
- Ben Batt as Rudy
- Natalia Tena as Inez
- Nicholas Gleaves as Tony Gaskell
- Peter Davison as Graham
- Claire Skinner as Tricia
- Sue Johnston as Aunt Mary
- Anne Reid as Nancy Gaskell
- Ben Hunter as Barnaby

=== Recurring ===
- Tony Hirst as Jerry
- Kevin Doyle as Michael
- Oliver Huntingdon as Carl Gaskell
- Mark Bazeley as Gavin Peachey
- Macy Seelochan as Miranda Burchill
- Shannon Lavelle as Chloe Burchill
- Angel Coulby as Jenny Lennocks
- Richard Fleeshman as JoJo
- Jonathan Pryce as Keith Eckersley

== Episodes ==
No.	Title	Directed by	Written by	Original release date
1	"Episode 1"	Sally Wainwright	Sally Wainwright	12 October 2025
Five women's worlds collide gloriously when they accidentally form a punk rock band.
2	"Episode 2"	Sally Wainwright	Sally Wainwright	12 October 2025
Chaotic Kitty Eckersley enters the building and helps focus the band's direction.
3	"Episode 3"	Sally Wainwright	Sally Wainwright	12 October 2025
Struggling to process the shock of her discovery, Kitty starts behaving badly.
4	"Episode 4"	Amanda Brotchie	Sally Wainwright	12 October 2025
Six weeks on, and it's the talent contest! But will everyone make it to the stage?
5	"Episode 5"	Amanda Brotchie	Sally Wainwright	12 October 2025
Kitty spends the night in custody. Beth and Tom have a heartbreaking conversation.
6	"Episode 6"	Amanda Brotchie	Sally Wainwright	12 October 2025
The Riot Women make their first recording, in a proper studio.

== Production ==
Sally Wainwright is writer and executive producer on the series which was announced in August 2023 under the title Hot Flush. In April 2024, Wainwright revealed the title had been changed to Riot Women and the project had a song about hormone replacement therapy (HRT) called "Seeing Red". This and other original songs were created for the series by Hanni Pidduck and Clara Townsend of the Brighton duo ARXX. The actors learned to play the instruments they play on screen.

The cast is led by Lorraine Ashbourne, Joanna Scanlan, Tamsin Greig, Rosalie Craig, and Amelia Bullmore. In September 2024, Anne Reid, Sue Johnston, Taj Atwal, Claire Skinner, Peter Davison, Amit Shah, Kevin Doyle and Chandeep Uppal were confirmed in the cast.

Filming took place in Hebden Bridge in Yorkshire in June and July 2024.

Wainwright said: "I'm having a whole new buzz of excitement about the show as we bring it together in the edit, and I can't wait to share it with everyone!"

The series was renewed by the BBC in November 2025, with filming scheduled for Hebden Bridge in February 2027.

== Broadcast ==
The series began broadcasting on 12 October 2025 on BBC One with all episodes released on BBC iPlayer the same day. BritBox will air the series in the US and Canada.

== Reception ==
The series received "generally favourable" reviews on Metacritic, with a weighted average score of 82 out of 100, based on 13 reviews from critics. On review aggregator website Rotten Tomatoes, 93% of 27 critics' reviews were positive. The website's critics consensus reads, "Sally Wainwright strikes the right chord in this uproarious delight, including a gusty cast of Riot Women who fiercely showcase their right to rock, no matter their age."

Lucy Mangan of The Guardian called Riot Women one of Sally Wainwright’s best works:

Like all Wainwright’s best work, Riot Women covers a lot of ground without getting bogged down or leaving the viewer feeling shortchanged. (…) It is a drama that, like Happy Valley, looks at the multitudinous roles women manage, the caring responsibilities that accumulate and how they evolve over a lifetime. Children leave home but never stop taking. Mothers become children and take some more. What do you do if you are caught between the two, alone, and no one is around to give you anything? You turn to your equally depleted friends, dig deeper and give what you can to each other. You become a self-supporting circle, which itself becomes a link in the chain that can keep an entire society going.

Professor Beth Johnson from the University of Leeds commended the formidable cast, praised the show’s ability to let humour and anger sit side by side, and declared that Wainwright has thus created her boldest and most necessary work to date.

Tiff Bakker, in an opinion piece for The Guardian, acknowledged a need for a series like this and Sally Wainwright's credentials as a writer, but found that the series fell short of the opportunity. She criticised several aspects including the lack of a credible gay woman character and a mismatch with the legacy of the riot grrrl movement of the 1990s, calling the series by contrast "straight, suburban and staunchly conventional". The reviewer from Autostraddle, on the other hand, liked that the "show is gay in an effortless and substantial way".

In March 2026, at the 2026 Royal Television Society Programme Awards Sally Wainwright was nominated for Writer - Drama.
