= Danny Tate =

- Born: John Daniel Tate; November 10, 1955 (age 70)
- Genres: Rock, pop, country
- Occupations: Singer, musician, songwriter, composer, producer
- Instruments: vocals, guitar, piano
- Years active: 1978–present
- Labels: Virgin Records, Charisma Records, Welk Music Group, Island Records, Noville Records, Gravity Records, Back Door to Heaven Music, Come on In Music Publishing

John Daniel "Danny" Tate (born November 10, 1955) is an American musician, songwriter, composer, producer, and former Virgin Records recording artist best known for writing songs which were covered by Jeff Healey, Kenny Wayne Shepherd, Lynyrd Skynyrd, Tim McGraw, The Oak Ridge Boys, The Smithereens, Diesel, Nelson, David Lee Murphy, Billy Ray Cyrus, Doro (Doro Pesch), The Fabulous Thunderbirds, Patti LaBelle, Walk the West, Cactus Brothers, Carla Olson, Danny Wilde, and many other artists.

Most notably Tate won the NSAI Rock Song of the Year award for 1998, 1999, and 2000. His debut was writing the 1983 multi-platinum hit, "Affair of the Heart", by Rick Springfield. He released three solo albums, Danny Tate Charisma/Virgin (1992), Nobody's Perfect Charisma/Virgin (1995), and Destination X Noville Records (2005), meeting limited success and continued his career writing songs, composing for television shows, (Extra, Entertainment Tonight, The Tyra Banks Show, The Ellen DeGeneres Show) and contributing to the film soundtracks of 3000 Miles to Graceland, Boys Don't Cry, and How to Make an American Quilt.

== Associated acts ==
David Lee Murphy, The Warren Brothers, Doro, Tim McGraw, Russ Taff, Kenny Wayne Shepherd, The Smithereens, Rick Springfield, The Oak Ridge Boys, Patti LaBelle, Jeff Healey, Billy Ray Cyrus, Lynyrd Skynyrd, Travis Tritt, Dwight Yoakam, Diesel, Jack Casady, Nelson (Matthew and Gunnar Nelson), Béla Fleck, The Rembrandts, Danny Johnson, John Brannen, and John Cowan.

== Early life ==
John Daniel Tate was born on November 10, 1955 to David Munroe Tate Jr. and Hazel Ella Tate in Beaumont east of Houston. When he was 6, Danny and his family moved to Camden southwest of Little Rock, Arkansas where his father, a music minister, accepted a position at a church. There, Danny absorbed the musical and religious influences of a classic small town setting. In 1974, he left home to attend college, where he studied under the renowned composer and conductor, William Francis McBeth.

Danny Tate graduated and is listed in Who's Who in American Colleges and Universities and is a member of Mensa. In 1989 Governor Bill Clinton appointed Tate an "Arkansas Traveler", an ambassador of good will.

== Career ==
After graduating with a Bachelor of Music degree in music theory and composition in 1978, Tate found work as a solo performer for a high school assembly service in Chicago. Touring continuously on a grueling schedule, Tate performed a combination of popular radio hits, his own songs, and told stories in a one-man show for high school students. From 1978 to 1980, Tate performed 600 shows in 3 semesters and at one point has had the most successful ratings and sales in the service's 50-year history.

Later in 1980, Tate moved to Nashville pursuing a career in the music industry. His big break came when a friend cornered Rick Springfield in the restroom of a club and handed him a cassette tape of Tate's song "Superman" which immediately caught Springfield's attention. Tate wrote off the experience as being a brief encounter until he received a phone call from Springfield's manager, who requested the use of a substantial and extremely infectious part of the song. After a melding of minds as it were, the writers came up with a song co-written by Tate which morphed into a runaway hit, "Affair of the Heart". Springfield's recording of the song peaked at #9 on Billboard charts, the album Living in Oz went platinum, and the song was nominated for a Grammy (losing to Michael Jackson's "Beat It").

== Solo career ==
Riding on that success, Tate moved to Los Angeles where he felt his talents would be more profitable as a pop/rock songwriter. He embarked on a solo career releasing Danny Tate (1992), Nobody’s Perfect (1995) followed up with the "Dreamin'" tour featuring Danny Johnson formerly with Rick Derringer, Rod Stewart, and The Troggs on guitar, and Destination X (2005). In 2005, Tate also released a Christmas single, "Wonder what Jesus thinks about Christmas," with a clever and unique look at the Christmas holiday.

== Movie credits ==
- How to Make an American Quilt (1995)
- Boys Don't Cry (1999)
- 3000 Miles to Graceland (2001)
- The Black Dove (not yet released)

== Television credits ==
Enjoying uncommon success as a songwriter in a variety of musical genres spanning pop, rock, country, alternative, heavy metal, and blues, Tate expanded his resume to include musical cues and underscore for television shows. His compositions have been featured on Entertainment Tonight, Extra, TMZ, Celebrity Justice, The Insider, The Ellen DeGeneres Show, The Tyra Banks Show, The Bachelor, As the World Turns, Guiding Light, and Judge Mathis.

== Awards ==
NSAI Rock Song of the Year 1998, 1999, 2000 BMI #1 Awards Multiple Platinum and Gold Records

“Only an artist of rare talent, intelligence, and instinct could achieve the kind of lasting success that Tate has enjoyed"—Vincent Jeffries (VH1.com)
