= Living in Oz =

Studio album by Rick Springfield
- Released: 30 March 1983
- Studio: Sound City Studios
- Genre: Rock
- Length: 39:19
- Label: RCA Victor
- Producer: Bill Drescher

Rick Springfield chronology
Success Hasn't Spoiled Me Yet (1982)	Living in Oz (1983)	Hard to Hold (1984)

Singles from Living in Oz
- 1. "Affair of the Heart" Released: April 1983; 2. "Human Touch" Released: June 1983; 3. "Souls" Released: October 1983

Professional ratings
Review scores
Source	Rating
AllMusic	4/5 stars
Rolling Stone	2/5 stars

Living in Oz is the seventh studio album by Australian rock musician Rick Springfield, released on 30 March 1983, by RCA Records. The album was quickly certified platinum in America.

In 1984, Springfield was nominated for a Grammy Award for Best Male Rock Vocal Performance for the "Affair of the Heart" single, which peaked at number nine on the Billboard Hot 100 and No. 10 on the Cash Box Top 100. "Human Touch" peaked at No. 18 and "Souls" peaked at No. 23 on the Hot 100.

The album's title is an allusion to living in Australia (Oz = Australia).

== Track listing ==
All songs written by Rick Springfield, except "Affair of the Heart", co-written with Danny Tate and Blaise Tosti.

1. "Human Touch" – 5:08
2. "Alyson" – 3:49
3. "Affair of the Heart" – 4:33
4. "Living in Oz" – 3:49
5. "Me & Johnny" – 4:26
6. "Motel Eyes" – 3:12
7. "Tiger by the Tail" – 3:25
8. "Souls" – 4:15
9. "I Can't Stop Hurting You" – 3:44
10. "Like Father, Like Son" – 2:57

== Personnel ==
- Rick Springfield – lead vocals, guitar, bass, backing vocals
- Tim Pierce – guitar
- Mike Seifrit, Dennis Belfield – bass
- Brett Tuggle, Alan Pasqua, Gabriel Katona, John Philip Shenale, Mitchell Froom – keyboards
- Mike Baird – drums
- Jack White – electronic drums
- Richard Elliot – saxophone solo on "Human Touch"
- Michael Fisher – percussion
- Richard Page, Tom Kelly – backing vocals
- String arrangements on "Like Father, Like Son": Tom Scott (also the conductor), Rick Springfield, John Philip Shenale
- Engineered by Bill Drescher at Sound City
- Mastered by Greg Fulginiti at Artisan Sound Recorders

== Charts ==
Chart (1983)	Peak position
Australia (Kent Music Report)	45
Canada (Canadian Albums Chart)	20
United States (Billboard 200)	12

== Certifications ==
Certifications for Living in Oz
Region	Certification	Certified units/sales
Canada (Music Canada)	Gold	50,000^{^}
United States (RIAA)	Platinum	1,000,000^{^}
^{^} Shipments figures based on certification alone.
