= Moira Buffini =

English author, dramatist, director, and actor

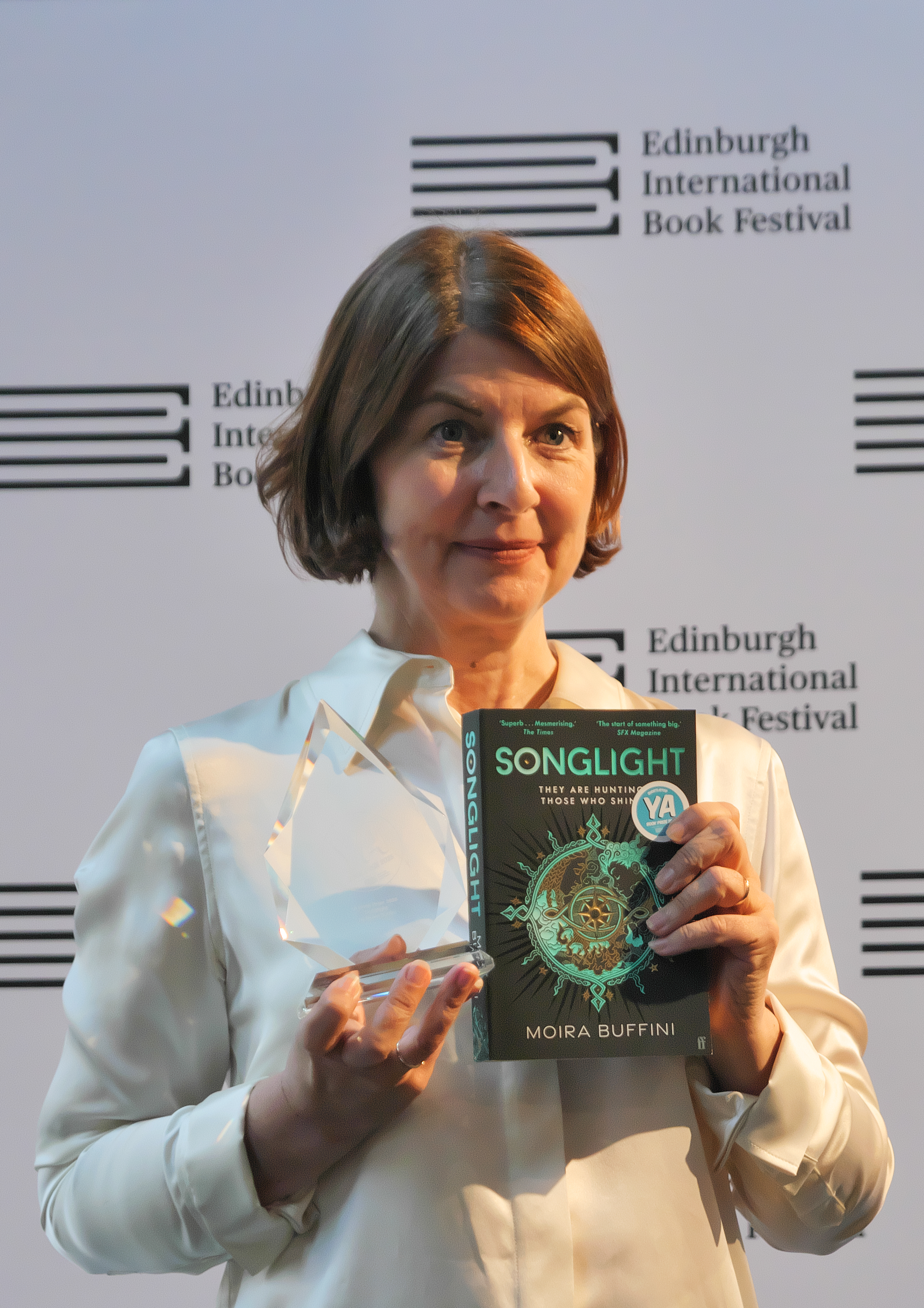
- Buffini won the YA Book Prize at the 2025 Edinburgh International Book Festival
- Born: Cheshire, UK
- Occupations: Novelist, Dramatist, Director, Actor
- Writing career
- Genre: Young adult

Moira Buffini (born 29 May 1965) is an English author, dramatist, director, and actor.

== Early life ==
Buffini was born in Cheshire, England, to Irish parents, and attended St Mary's College at Rhos-on-Sea in Wales as a day girl. She studied English and Drama at Goldsmiths College, London University (1983–86). She subsequently trained as an actor at the Royal Welsh College of Music & Drama in Cardiff.

== Career ==
For Jordan, co-written with Anna Reynolds in 1992, Buffini won a Time Out Award for her performance and Writers' Guild Award for Best Fringe play. Buffini's 1997 play Gabriel was performed at Soho Theatre, winning the LWT Plays on Stage award and the Meyer-Whitworth Award. Her 1999 play Silence earned Buffini the Susan Smith Blackburn Prize for best English-language play by a woman. Loveplay followed at the RSC in 2001, then Dinner at the National Theatre in 2003 which transferred to the West End and was nominated for an Olivier Award for Best Comedy.

Buffini wrote Dying For It, a free adaptation of Nikolai Erdman's classic The Suicide, for the Almeida Theatre in 2007. She followed it with Marianne Dreams a dance play with choreographer Will Tuckett, based on Catherine Storr's book. Her play for young people, A Vampire Story was performed as part of NT Connections in 2008. She did a writers’ attachment at the Royal National Theatre Studio in 1996.

Buffini advocates big, imaginative plays rather than naturalistic soap opera dramas, and is a founder member of the Monsterists, a group of playwrights who promote new writing of large scale work in the British theatre. She has been described by David Greig as a metaphysical playwright. All her plays have been published by Faber.

Buffini is also a prolific screenwriter. In 2010 her film adaptation of Posy Simmon's Tamara Drewe was released, directed by Stephen Frears. In 2011 her adaptation of Jane Eyre for BBC Films and Ruby Films was released. The script appeared on the 2008 Brit List, a film-industry-compiled list of the best unproduced screenplays in British film. It received nine votes, putting it in second place. Buffini adapted her play A Vampire Story for the screenplay of Neil Jordan's film Byzantium released in 2013.

She took part in the Bush Theatre's 2011 project Sixty Six Books for which she wrote a poem titled “God is Jealous,” based upon Nahum, a book of the King James Bible.

She was elected a Fellow of the Royal Society of Literature in 2014.

On the 21 January 2015, it was announced that Manchester International Festival would premier wonder.land, a new musical with music by Damon Albarn, book and lyrics by Moira Buffini and direction from Rufus Norris. wonder.land is inspired by Alice In Wonderland by Lewis Carroll and is a co-production with the National Theatre.

On 21 August 2025 Buffini won the YA Book Prize at the Edinburgh International Book Festival, for her dystopian debut novel Songlight.

== Books ==
=== The Torch Trilogy ===
- Songlight (2024)
- Torchfire (2025)
- Flarestorm (2026)

== Plays ==
- Jordan (1992)
- Gabriel (1997)
- Blavatsky's Tower (1998)
- Silence (1999)
- The Games Room
- Loveplay (2001)
- Dinner (2002)
- Dying For It (2007) a free adaptation of Nikolai Erdman's The Suicide
- A Vampire Story (2008)
- Welcome to Thebes (2010)
- Greenland (2011) written with Penelope Skinner, Matt Charman and Jack Thorne
- Handbagged (2013)
- wonder.land (2015)
- Manor (2021)

== Filmography ==
- Marianne Dreams (2007)
- Handbagged (2010)
- Tamara Drewe (2010)
- Jane Eyre (2011)
- Byzantium (2012)
- Viceroy's House (2017)
- Harlots (2017-2019)
- The Dig (2021)
