= Wonder.land =

Musical

wonder.land
- Music: Damon Albarn
- Lyrics: Moira Buffini
- Book: Moira Buffini
- Basis: Alice's Adventures in Wonderland by Lewis Carroll; Through the Looking-Glass by Lewis Carroll
- Premiere: 2 July 2015: Palace Theatre, Manchester
- Productions: 2015 Manchester; 2015 London; 2016 Paris

Wonder.land (stylised as wonder.land) is a musical with music by Damon Albarn and lyrics and book by Moira Buffini. Inspired by Lewis Carroll's novels Alice's Adventures in Wonderland (1865) and Through the Looking-Glass (1871), it had its world premiere at the Palace Theatre in Manchester in July 2015 as part of the Manchester International Festival. The musical moved to London's Royal National Theatre in November 2015 before opening at the Théâtre du Châtelet in Paris in 2016. Licensing for potential future smaller scale productions is held by United Agents UK.

== Background ==
The musical is inspired by the novels Alice in Wonderland and Through the Looking-Glass, written by Lewis Carroll. It was announced on 21 January 2015 that the show would premiere in July of that year as part of the Manchester International Festival, with tickets going on sale the following day. The musical, a co-production by the Manchester International Festival, the Royal National Theatre and the Théâtre du Châtelet in Paris, marks the 150th anniversary of the publication of Alice's Adventures in Wonderland.

The idea for a musical based on Alice in Wonderland came from Manchester International Festival artistic director Alex Poots. Damon Albarn had collaborated with the festival on Monkey: Journey to the West and Dr Dee.

The musical has a book by Moira Buffini. It was directed by Rufus Norris, with set design by Rae Smith, costume design by Katrina Lindsay, lighting design by Paule Constable, projections by 59 Productions and choreography by Javier De Frutos. The musical's score was composed by Damon Albarn, with lyrics by Moira Buffini, sound design by Paul Arditti and musical direction by David Shrubsole.

== Production history ==
The musical began previews at the Palace Theatre in Manchester on 29 June 2015. It opened on 2 July for a limited run until 12 July. A revised version moved to the Royal National Theatre, where it ran at the Olivier Theatre from 27 November 2015 to 30 April 2016. The production had a limited run, from 7 to 16 June 2016, at the Theatre Du Chatelet in Paris.

== Synopsis ==
This synopsis is based on the final version, as seen at the National Theatre and the Théâtre du Châtelet. Earlier performances significantly differed in songs and plot.

=== Act 1 ===
AI, the MC, explains that virtual technology is "a portal to boundless lands" ("Prologue"). Aly's mother, Bianca, is exasperated with her for spending the weekend indoors on her phone. Aly accompanies Bianca to the supermarket, and thinks that her life is being ruined by her parents due to dysfunctional problems ("Who's Ruining Your Life?")

Her alcoholic father, Matt, is also at the supermarket; he and Bianca argue about their divorce and his gambling. Aly goes home and picks up her phone. She tries to engage with schoolmates, who bully her ("Network"). Aly begins to wish that she is someone else.

She finds the virtual online game Wonder.land. In its strange world, Aly creates an avatar: beautiful, kind Alice ("Wonder.land"). Wonder.land has one rule: malice causes deletion from the game. Aly and Alice become friends and encounter the Cheshire Cat, who explains that you can be anyone you want ("Fabulous"). Aly decides to go on a quest; Alice follows the white rabbit down a hole, falling past unusual objects and musical notes ("Falling").

The next morning, Aly is too distracted by Wonder.land to listen to Bianca's complaints about her baby brother Charlie. She plays the game at school before her phone is confiscated by stern headmistress Ms Manxome, who tells her students that taking pleasures from them is for their own good ("I'm Right").

Aly goes to Ms Manxome's office to retrieve her phone. Ms Manxome returns it, warning that if she catches her with it again, "it's a beheading – I mean, detention." Aly sees the girls who bullied her, and they bully her again until a teacher arrives. Aly's friend, Luke, is late and is given detention. Aly goes on her phone and takes out her frustration and sadness on Alice, whose tears form a pool until she is interrupted by the quarrelsome twins Dum and Dee ("Freaks"). Alice tries to befriend them, but they insult her and Aly makes her fight them. Dum and Dee cry, and Aly and Alice see a large mouse who is attracted by Alice's fighting. They are joined by the Dodo, the Mock Turtle and Humpty, who all have problems. The Dodo is stressed because his parents want him to save the planet; Dum and Dee are dancers who hate pressure; Humpty has problems with her parents; the Mock Turtle lacks self-esteem, and the mouse is lustful. Wonderland is a hiding place from teenage life ("Crap Life").

Aly returns to reality when asked a math question she cannot answer. Confronting the three bullies, Aly mocks the facial hair of one and hides in the bathroom. She again immerses herself in Wonder.land, where Alice meets a Caterpillar who is obsessed with identity ("Who are You?"). Aly is interrupted by the girls, who ridicule her father's gambling addiction and poverty before beating her up. Aly seeks understanding from Alice, who tries to get Aly to tell her what is wrong. Aly tells Alice about her family and how she hates her life, and is surprised that Alice has similar problems ("Secrets").

Luke comes into the girls' bathroom because Kieran has threatened him with violence, and hides in a cubicle when Kieran enters. Aly defends Luke, and makes Kieran leave. Luke reveals that the reason Kieran hates him is because, like himself, he is gay. Aly is amazed, and they skip class and play games on their phones. Luke plays Zombie Swarm, and Aly plays Wonder.land. Ms Manxome enters the bathroom; Luke hides his phone, but Aly does not. Ms Manxome confiscates the phone for three months, and Aly and Luke leave. Ms Manxome finds that Aly did not lock her phone, and Alice is calling her. Ms Manxome begins to talk to her, and Alice thinks she is talking to Aly.

Aly complains to Luke about her phone being taken away. Matt then takes them out for tea to celebrate his new job at the local garden centre ("In Clover"). At the tea shop, Matt maniacally dances on the tables and plays with spoons; asked to stop, he punches a waiter. Bianca arrives, and they argue again. Aly begins to notice that Wonder.land is invading reality; the MC emerges from a gigantic teapot, and the landscape outside becomes surreal ("Chances").

=== Act 2 ===
Ms Manxome manipulates Alice around Wonder.land on Aly's phone, buys many things, and makes Alice's hair red ("Entre Act"). She tells Alice about her plans to dominate and destroy the online world, and Alice thinks she is talking to Aly ("Me").

Aly, Matt, Bianca, and Charlie are at the police station. PC Rook unsuccessfully tries to get Matt to make a statement (since he is charged with assault and affray), but Matt and Bianca argue again. Aly laments the loss of her family's unity ("Heartless Useless").

In Wonder.land, Ms Manxome is hostile when she meets Dum and Dee, the Mock Turtle, the Dodo, Humpty and the Mouse. She makes Alice chase them away, but Alice and Ms Manxome are driven away by Alice's friends, who are worried about the change in her ("Me (Reprise)").

Bianca learns that Aly missed a detention and had her phone confiscated. Concerned that she is losing Aly to technology, she bans her from the internet ("Gadget"). Charlie vomits, and Aly is left to clean it up. She looks for an internet cafe to go to Wonder.land, the only place she is truly happy ("Everyone Loves Charlie").

At the cafe, Aly cannot log into Wonder.land and her avatar seems to be in use. She sees Alice receive a Vorpal sword, bought by Ms Manxome with the money on Aly's phone. Alice is no longer Alice but the Red Queen, and Ms Manxome tells her to kill her friends. Alice, knowing the person controlling her is not Aly, cannot rebel; she lashes out at her friends, bullying and trying to hurt them. The MC warns that Alice has a deletion warning – any more malice, and she will be deleted. Aly now knows that Ms Manxome controls her phone and avatar ("O Children"). Aly enlists Luke to help and decides to break into Ms. Manxome's office to retrieve the phone. Luke agrees to meet her at the school gates.

Matt and Bianca wonder if they should reconcile ("Man of Broken Glass"). At the school, Luke is reluctant to get involved; Aly decides to break into the office anyway. Luke contacts the girls who bullied Aly and tells them about Ms Manxome playing on Aly's stolen phone. They decide to spread the word that it is not Aly ("Fabulous (Reprise)").

Bianca goes to the police because Aly is missing, and gives her phone to Matt. Aly is likely to also be in Wonder.land. The avatars prepare for war against Alice but disagree about a strategy. At the police station, Matt hacks into Wonder.land sees Alice, and realizes that she is controlled by someone other than Aly. The White Rabbit appears (delighting Alice), but Ms Manxome makes Alice push him aside. The borderline between Wonder.land and reality begins to merge. Aly, in Ms Manxome's office, grabs the phone and they fight. In Wonder.land, Alice fights herself and the Red Queen. In her confusion she beheads the White Rabbit with the vorpal sword, and the MC declares that she will be deleted. Ms Manxome grabs the phone back, and the fight resumes.

Matt and Bianca realize that Aly is in Ms Manxome's office. Online, the three girls and Luke watch. Luke hacks Wonder.land to include zombies from Zombie Swarm. Ms Manxome is about to guillotine Aly in her office. Alice aims the vorpal sword at Luke and innocently kisses him, appalling him. Ms Manxome makes Alice kill Luke ("Who is Alice?"), realizes the error of her way after being horrified by what she does, Alice finally snaps and fights off the Red Queen, which causes them to glitch away. Before Alice is deleted, she apologises for her behavior, and says that her quest was to help Aly understand who she was. Aly thanks her and says goodbye, and Alice disappears.

Wonder.land and reality separate, and Aly is reunited with Matt and Bianca; Luke livestreams Ms Manxome as evidence. Ms Manxome thinks she is innocent ("I'm Right (Reprise)"), and will expel Aly and Luke. Matt finds Aly's phone and reminds Ms Manxome that she spent Aly's money on purchases for Wonder.land. PC Rook arrests Ms Manxome, while Aly finds herself in Alice, who lives on in her memory ("Secrets (Reprise)"),

Several months later, Aly, now living in new life, goes online and learns that her friends in Wonder.land want her back. Aly decides not to because she now cares about her family ("Wonder. land (Reprise)").

== Musical numbers ==
=== Act 1 ===
- "Prologue" - MC
- "Who's Ruining Your Life?" - Aly, Bianca, Matt and company
- "Network" - Aly, Kitty, Dinah, Mary-Ann
- "Wonder.land" - MC, Aly and company
- "Fabulous" - Cheshire Cat, Aly, Alice and company
- "Falling" - Aly, Alice, MC and company
- "I'm Right" - Ms Manxome, Aly, Luke and company
- "Crap Life" - Aly, Alice, Dum, Dee, Mouse, Mock Turtle, Humpty, Dodo
- "Who are You?" - Caterpillar and company
- "Secrets"- Aly, Alice
- "In Clover" - Matt
- "Chances" - Matt, Aly, Luke and company

=== Act 2 ===
- "Entre Act" - Orchestra
- "Me" - Ms Manxome, Alice
- "Heartless Useless" - Bianca, Matt, PC Rook, Aly
- "Me (Reprise)"- Ms Manxome, Alice, Mouse, Dum, Dee, Mock Turtle, Dodo, Humpty
- "Gadget" - Bianca, Aly
- "Everyone Loves Charlie" - Aly, Matt, Bianca and company
- "O Children" - Ms Manxome, Alice, Aly
- "Man of Broken Glass" - Matt, Bianca
- "Fabulous (Reprise)" - MC
- "Who is Alice?" - MC, Ms Manxome, Alice, Aly, Kitty, Dinah, Mary-Ann, Matt, Bianca and company
- "I'm Right (Reprise)" - Ms Manxome, PC Rook, Aly, Bianca, Matt, Luke and company
- "Secrets (Reprise)" - Aly, Alice
- "Wonder.land (Reprise)" - MC, Aly, Luke, Bianca and company

== Principal roles and cast members ==
Character	Manchester	London	Paris
Character	2015	2015-16	2016
Aly	Lois Chimimba	Lois Chimimba	Lois Chimimba
Alice	Rosalie Craig	Carly Bawden	Carly Bawden
Bianca	Golda Rosheuvel	Golda Rosheuvel	Golda Rosheuvel
Matt	Paul Hilton	Paul Hilton	Paul Hilton
Ms Manxome	Anna Francolini	Anna Francolini	Anna Francolini
MC		Hal Fowler	Hal Fowler
Cheshire Cat	Hal Fowler	Hal Fowler	Hal Fowler
Caterpillar	Hal Fowler	Hal Fowler	Hal Fowler
Dodo	Ivan De Freitas	Ivan De Freitas	Ivan De Freitas
Mouse	David Page	Ed Wade	Ed Wade
Lizard	Luke Fetherstone	N/A	N/A
Mock Turtle	Cydney Uffindell-Phillips	Cydney Uffindell-Phillips	Cydney Uffindell-Phillips
Hedgehog	Holly James	N/A	N/A
Humpty	N/A	Daisy Maywood	Daisy Maywood
Dum	Sam Archer	Sam Archer	Sam Archer
Dee	Sam Mackay	Leon Cooke	Leon Cooke
White Rabbit	Rob Compton	Joshua Lacey	Joshua Lacey
Luke	Enyi Okoronkwo	Enyi Okoronkwo	Enyi Okoronkwo
Kitty	Katrina Hind	Abigail Rose	Abigail Rose
Dinah	Witney White	Witney White	Witney White
Mary-Ann	Daisy Maywood	Stephanie Rojas	Stephanie Rojas
Kieran	Luke Fetherstone	Ed Wade	Ed Wade
Mr King	N/A	Adrian Grove	Adrian Grove
PC Rook	Lorraine Graham	Nadine Cox	Nadine Cox

== Critical reception ==
Wonder.land received mixed reviews in its Manchester premiere; its projections were praised, but its narrative and music were criticised. A re-tooled version of the musical opened at the National Theatre in London on 23 November 2015, where it received largely-negative reviews.

It began a limited run at the Théâtre du Châtelet in Paris on 6 June 2016. The musical received mostly-positive reviews from French critics.

== Soundtrack ==
Songs from wonder.land

Soundtrack album by Damon Albarn
- Released: 15 April 2016
- Genres: Pop, musical theatre
- Length: 47:35
- Label: Parlophone
- Producer: Damon Albarn

Damon Albarn chronology
The Magic Whip (2015)	Songs from wonder.land (2016)	The Orchestra of Syrian Musicians (2016)

Damon Albarn solo chronology
Live at the De De De Der (2014)	Songs from wonder.land (2016)	The Nearer the Fountain, More Pure the Stream Flows (2021)

Songs from wonder.land was released on 15 April 2016. The soundtrack, performed by the National Theatre cast, includes two songs not in the musical: "Japanese Duchess" and "Alice Saw".

All lyrics are written by Moira Buffini; all music is composed by Damon Albarn.

No.	Title	Length
1.	"Entre Act"	1:31
2.	"wonder.land"	1:46
3.	"Fabulous"	3:16
4.	"Me"	5:17
5.	"Secrets"	3:50
6.	"In Clover"	2:57
7.	"Avatars Holding Page"	2:01
8.	"Who Are You"	5:32
9.	"I'm Right"	2:55
10.	"Everyone Loves Charlie"	4:44
11.	"Japanese Duchess"	1:41
12.	"Man of Broken Glass"	3:02
13.	"Alice Saw"	3:03
Total length:		47:35

== See also ==
Dive in Wonderland (2025) Toshiya Shinohara and Yuko Kakihara's 2025 anime film, also released during a major anniversary year (Alice160) of Alice's adventures in Wonderland's publication.
