= Billy Maher =

Radio broadcaster and musician

- Born: Liverpool, England
- Presenting career
- Show: ‘The Weekend Inn’
- Station: BBC Radio Merseyside (until 2020)
- Country: United Kingdom

Billy Maher is an English radio presenter and musician from Liverpool. He is most known for his late night weekend programmes on BBC Radio Merseyside.

== Life ==
Maher grew up and currently lives in Liverpool, England. He is married to Philomena. He is father to singer Siobhan Maher Kennedy.

== Career ==
Maher was a presenter on BBC Radio Merseyside, in which he presented ‘The Weekend Inn’ on late Saturday and Sunday evenings for many years until 2020.

Alongside being a radio presenter, Maher has been a cabaret singer for many decades, in addition to this, he runs his own recording studio. He has released over 20 music albums over the years, with many songs related to his hometown of Liverpool.

Maher has also produced music and voice-overs for the ‘Redwall Audio Series’.
