= Silence (1999 play) =

Play by Moira Buffini

Silence is a 1999 play by Moira Buffini, loosely based on the history of Dark Ages England but also drawing on New Millennium concerns at the time of its writing. It is set in Canterbury and Cumbria and on a journey between the two. It received its London premiere at the Arcola Theatre in August 2005.

== Characters ==
- Silence, Lord of Cumbria, a woman in disguise
- Roger, a priest
- Ethelred, King of England
- Ymma, a princess from Normandy
- Agnes, Ymma's servant
- Eadric, Ethelred's bodyguard
