= Human Touch (Rick Springfield song) =

Single by Rick Springfield

from the album Living in Oz
- B-side: "Souls"
- Released: June 1983
- Genre: Power pop; dance-rock; synth-rock
- Length: 5:07 (album version); 3:56 (radio edit)
- Label: RCA
- Songwriter: Rick Springfield

Rick Springfield singles chronology
"Affair of the Heart" (1983)	"Human Touch" (1983)	"Souls" (1983)

"Human Touch" is a song by Australian musician Rick Springfield, released in 1983 as the second single from his seventh album Living in Oz. The song reached number 18 on the Billboard Hot 100 in the US. It was also his most successful hit in the UK, peaking at number 23; this also led to a performance on Top of the Pops. Because of this being Springfield's only top 40 single in the UK, he is considered a one-hit wonder there, despite the fact that "Jessie's Girl" is his biggest hit worldwide. However, that song only peaked at No. 43 in 1984 for Springfield, 3 years after its first release in the UK.

== Critical reception ==
Cash Box noted the irony of using synthesizers and drum machines in a song that rails "against the impersonal coldness of computerized society," saying that this works "quite well."

== Music video ==
The music video for "Human Touch" begins with a point-of-view shot of rapidly passing stars in outer space. It then cuts to two figures wearing skeleton masks and fur clothing entering a decrepit room filled with stasis chambers. The figures flee after accidentally opening Springfield's chamber, which brings him out of suspended animation. Springfield (who is wearing a futuristic military uniform) interacts with an artificial intelligence named Sally via keyboard (who addresses him as "Captain" and tells him the year is 2016). Springfield uses the surrounding equipment to free his crew from their chambers. He also reanimates his band (which remains behind glass and includes a four-eyed humanoid saxophone player). After receiving a radiation warning, the crew hurries back into their stasis chambers, which Springfield reactivates. A crew member witnesses Springfield stumble and helps him into her chamber before the descending glass door seals them in together.
