= Say Something Good =

Studio album by River City People
- Released: 11 September 1989; 1990 (reissue)
- Label: EMI (UK/Europe); Capitol (US)
- Producer: Don Gehman; Ronni O'Keefe; Ronnie Stone; Nick Davis; River City People

River City People chronology
Say Something Good (1989)	This Is the World (1991)

Say Something Good is the debut studio album by River City People, released by EMI in Europe and Capitol in the US in 1989. Following a reissue in 1990, it reached No. 23 in the UK and remained in the charts for nine weeks.

River City People signed a recording contract with EMI in 1988, after Channel 4's The Chart Show commissioned a video for the band's song "(What's Wrong With) Dreaming?". The band then recorded their debut album in Los Angeles during January–March 1989 with producer Don Gehman.

Six singles were released from the album, the first of which, "(What's Wrong With) Dreaming?", was released in July 1989 and peaked at No. 70 in the UK. The follow-up, "Say Something Good", failed to chart and the third, "Walking On Ice", reached No. 62. The double A-side, "Carry the Blame"/"California Dreamin'", was released in June 1990 and gave the band a No. 13 hit. A remixed version of "(What's Wrong With) Dreaming?" peaked at No. 40 and the final single, "When I Was Young", peaked at No. 62.

== Reception ==
Professional ratings
Review scores
Source	Rating
Dayton Daily News	3.5/5 stars
Record Mirror	4/5 stars
Smash Hits	8/10 stars

Upon release, Music & Media wrote: "The band seem to have their roots in the late 60s. The songs all have a distinct 60s feel for melodies and harmonies, which makes it a pleasant, if not lovable record." Billboard described the album as one which "merges London pop sensibilities with American rock vibes". They added: "Singer Siobhan Maher breathes dimension into sensitive and perceptive prose composed by bandmates/brothers Tim and Paul Speed." Mark Frith of Smash Hits wrote: "Virtually all the songs are excellent and the Rivers aren't afraid to use manic guitars on straight-forward pop songs. On top of all that, Siobhan Maher's vocals are positively the chirpiest in pop."

Anne Warren Murray of Dayton Daily News considered the album a "strong first effort" and added: "It's hard to say which side is better, since both are filled with alluring, melodic songs." She highlighted the "upbeat" tracks "(What's Wrong with) Dreaming?" and "Walking On Ice", and the "more mellow" "No Doubt" and "When I Was Young". Steven Miller of The Daily Utah Chronicle wrote: "The [album contains] ten cuts worth of quirky pop that owes a bit to All About Eve, vintage U2 and Laurie Anderson but stands out with an identity all its own."

== Track listing ==
No.	Title	Writer(s)	Length
1.	"(What's Wrong With) Dreaming?"	Paul Speed, Tim Speed, Siobhan Maher	4:03
2.	"Walking On Ice"	Paul Speed, Tim Speed	4:56
3.	"Under the Rainbow"	Paul Speed, Tim Speed	5:02
4.	"Carry the Blame"	Tim Speed	3:19
5.	"Say Something Good"	Paul Speed, Tim Speed	4:41
6.	"Thirsty"	Tim Speed	4:11
7.	"When I Was Young"	David Snell, Tim Speed	4:21
8.	"No Doubt"	Siobhan Maher, Tim Speed	3:47
9.	"I'm Still Waiting"	Paul Speed, Tim Speed	4:54
10.	"Home and Dry"	Tim Speed	5:57

1989 CD additional tracks
No.	Title	Writer(s)	Length
11.	"Huskisson St."	Tim Speed, Paul Speed	2:47
12.	"Find a Reason"	Siobhan Maher, David Snell	3:35

1990 reissue
No.	Title	Writer(s)	Length
1.	"(What's Wrong With) Dreaming?"		4:03
2.	"Walking On Ice"		4:56
3.	"Under the Rainbow"		5:02
4.	"California Dreamin'"	John Phillips, Michelle Phillips	2:21
5.	"Carry the Blame"		3:19
6.	"Say Something Good"		4:41
7.	"Thirsty"		4:11
8.	"When I Was Young"		4:21
9.	"No Doubt"		3:47
10.	"I'm Still Waiting"		4:54
11.	"Home and Dry"		5:57

1990 CD reissue
No.	Title	Length
11.	"Find a Reason"	3:35
12.	"Huskisson St."	2:47
13.	"Home and Dry"	5:57

== Personnel ==
River City People

- Siobhan Maher - vocals
- Tim Speed - guitars, vocals
- David Snell - bass
- Paul Speed - drums, percussion

Additional musicians

- Phil Shenale - keyboards, keyboard programming
- John Helliwell - saxophone on "Home and Dry"

Production

- Don Gehman - producer, engineer
- John Carter, Ed Thacker - engineer
- Dan Bosworth, Pete Magdeleno, Robin Laine - assistant engineers
- River City People - producers of "California Dreamin'" and "Huskisson St."
- Nick Davis - producer, engineer and mixer on "California Dreamin'"
- Ronnie Stone - producer of "Huskisson St."
- Ronni O'Keefe - producer of "Find a Reason"

Other

- Abraham Pants - artwork (1989 release)
- Paul Cox - photography (1989 release)
- Normal Service - art direction, design (1990 release)
- Peter Mountain - photography (1990 release)

== Charts ==
Chart (1990)	Peak position
UK Albums (OCC)	23
