= The Light Princess =

Short story by George MacDonald

- Cover of 1962 edition.
- Author: George MacDonald
- Illustrator: Arthur Hughes
- Language: English
- Genre: Fairy tale
- Publication date: 1864
- Publication place: Scotland

The Light Princess is a Scottish fairy tale by George MacDonald. It was published in 1864 as a story within the larger story Adela Cathcart. Drawing on inspiration from the story "Sleeping Beauty", it tells the story of a princess afflicted by a constant weightlessness, unable to get her feet on the ground, both literally and metaphorically, until she finds a love that brings her down to earth.

== Summary ==
A king and queen, after some time, have a daughter. The king invites everyone to the christening, except his sister Princess Makemnoit, a spiteful and sour woman. She arrives without an invitation and curses the princess to have no gravity. Whenever the princess accidentally moves up in the air, she has to be brought down, and the wind is capable of carrying her off. As she grows, she never cries, and never can be brought to see the serious side of anything. The court philosophers, when consulted, are unable to propose any cure that the king and queen will suffer to be used.

She passionately loves swimming, and when she swims, she regains her gravity. This leads to the proposal that if she could be brought to cry, it might break the curse. But nothing can make her cry.

A prince from another country sets out to find a wife but finds fault in every princess he finds. He had not intended to seek out the light princess, but, upon becoming lost in a forest, he finds the princess swimming. Thinking she is drowning, he rescues her, ending up with her in the air, with her scolding him. He falls instantly in love and, upon her demand, puts her back in the water, and goes swimming with her. Days pass and the prince learns that her manner is changed between the water and the land, and he can not marry her as she is on land.

Princess Makemnoit, meanwhile, discovers that the Princess loves the lake so she sets out to dry it up. The water is drained from the lake, the springs are stopped up, and the rain ceases. Even babies no longer cry water.

As the lake dries up, it is discovered that the only way to stop it is to block the hole the water is flowing from, and the only thing that will block it is a living man, who would die in the deed. The prince volunteers, on the condition that the princess keeps him company while the lake fills. The lake fills up. When the prince has almost drowned, the princess frantically drags his body from the lake to take it to her old nurse, who is a wise woman. They tend him through the night, and he wakes at dawn. The princess falls to the floor and cries.

The prince desired to travel overland with the Princess so she could find her feet. After the princess masters the art of walking, she marries the prince. Princess Makemnoit's house is undermined by the waters and falls in, drowning her. The Light Princess and her Prince had children together.

== Adaptations ==
An animated version was released in 1978.

In 2013, a musical version by Tori Amos and Samuel Adamson inspired by the original story was premiered for the Royal National Theatre in London. The stage production featured actress Rosalie Craig as the title character. The musical was generally well-received, enjoyed an extended run in the theatre, and had its cast recording released in 2015.

Another musical also titled The Light Princess was written by Tony Lawton with music by Alex Bechtel, and debuted in April 2017 at the Arden Theatre Company.
