= This Is the World =

Studio album by River City People
- Released: 1991
- Length: 43:09
- Label: EMI
- Producer: David Nicholas; River City People; Marius de Vries; Steve Sidelnyk; Steve Ferrera

River City People chronology
Say Something Good (1989)	This Is the World (1991)

This Is the World is the second and final studio album by River City People, released by EMI in 1991. It reached No. 56 in the UK and spawned two singles, "Special Way" (UK No. 44) and "Standing in the Need of Love" (UK No. 36).

== Critical reception ==
Upon its release, The Guardian wrote, "Suppose Bono had been Pat Benatar and assuming she was in Dublin at the time, might something like this have been the result? As a follow-up to their successful [debut] album, River City People offer This Is the World, and quite clearly a couple of years on the road have given them a new confidence and sharper edge. This album sounds like the work of a band who are enjoying the process of discovering just how good they are." Hi-Fi News & Record Review commented, "The band's second release shows more bite than the far lighter debut, but it's no less melodic. Some suggestions that the band, especially the sterling vocalist, fell in love with the first Texas LP, but otherwise it's the kind of music which should make the band the darlings of the late night campus radio audience." Sally Margaret Joy of Melody Maker felt the album was "pretty boring". She noted Maher's "strong, sensual voice" but felt the album was overproduced in "true Corporate Rock fashion" with "over-cooked arrangements". She praised the track "Hurt You" for how it "swoons and sulks with a sheet-rumpling kind of elegance" and added, "More of this, and the River City People could merit some excessive admiration. But not yet."

== Track listing ==
No.	Title	Writer(s)	Length
1.	"Standing in the Need of Love"	Paul Speed, Tim Speed	3:51
2.	"Special Way"	Paul Speed, Tim Speed	3:14
3.	"Act Like a Child"	Paul Speed, Tim Speed	3:48
4.	"Hurt You"	Paul Speed, Tim Speed	3:59
5.	"Driver"	Tim Speed	3:25
6.	"Move a Mountain"	Tim Speed	4:40
7.	"Mile High Cafe"	Tim Speed	4:35
8.	"True Stories from the Revolution"	Tim Speed	3:43
9.	"The Sea"	David Snell, Siobhan Maher	3:41
10.	"High Tide"	David Snell, Siobhan Maher	3:28
11.	"This Is the World"	Paul Speed, Tim Speed	4:56

== Personnel ==
River City People

- Siobhan Maher - vocals
- Tim Speed - guitars, vocals
- David Snell - bass
- Paul Speed - drums, percussion

Production

- David Nicholas - producer (tracks 1–5, 7, 9–11), mixing (tracks 3–11), engineer (tracks 1–4, 7, 9), assistant engineer (tracks 10–11)
- River City People - producers (tracks 1–5, 7, 9–11)
- Marius de Vries, Steve Sidelnyk - producers (track 6), additional production (track 2)
- Steve Ferrera - producer (track 8)
- Chris Sheldon - mixing (tracks 1–2)
- Richard Chappell - engineer (tracks 2, 5), assistant engineer (tracks 1–4, 7)
- Ronni O'Keefe - engineer (tracks 5, 10–11)
- David Chappell - engineer (track 6)
- Nick Davis - mixing (track 8)
- Bob Kraushaar - engineer (track 8)
- Klaus Kummer - assistant engineer (track 8)

Other

- Normal Service - art direction, design, styling
- David Scheinmann - photography

== Charts ==
Chart (1991)	Peak position
UK Albums (OCC)	56
