= Affair of the Heart =

Single by Rick Springfield

from the album Living in Oz
- B-side: "Like Father, Like Son"
- Released: April 1983
- Genre: Hard rock
- Length: 4:33; 3:36 (7")
- Label: RCA
- Songwriters: Rick Springfield, Danny Tate, Blaise Tosti
- Producer: Bill Drescher

Rick Springfield singles chronology
"I Get Excited" (1982)	"Affair of the Heart" (1983)	"Human Touch" (1983)

"Affair of the Heart" is a hit song performed by Australian rock musician Rick Springfield. It was released as the lead single from his platinum-certified album Living in Oz.

Although only a minor hit in his native Australia, where it reached No. 26, the song was a top ten hit in the US, peaking at No. 9 on the Billboard Hot 100 and at No. 10 on the Cash Box Top 100 in mid-1983. It was the fourth of Springfield's five top 10 hits to date.

Cash Box said the song "shows a greater use of synthesizers and a hardened guitar sound" than previous Springfield songs, but retains his ability to create a powerful refrain.

"Affair of the Heart" was nominated for a Grammy Award for Best Male Rock Vocal Performance in 1984, but lost to "Beat It" by Michael Jackson.

At the premier of the live performance of Live and Kickin' in 1982, Springfield was using a urinal in a public bathroom when a stranger came up to him and handed him a cassette saying "You gotta hear this song. I wrote this song. You'll love it!". A couple of months later while driving to the set of General Hospital, Springfield played the cassette and heard the opening beats of the song.

== In popular culture ==
- Australian Broadcasting Corporation's television arm used an instrumental bit from this song as the background music for its 1984 logo.
- The song appears in the opening scene of Better Call Saul season 5, episode 6, "Wexler v. Goodman."

== Charts ==
Chart (1983)	Position
US Billboard Hot 100	9
US Cash Box Top 100	10

=== Year-end charts ===
Year-end chart (1983)	Position
US Top Pop Singles (Billboard)	57
