= Rae Smith =

British set and costume designer

Rae Smith is a British set and costume designer who has worked frequently in theatre and Live Art. Her designs can be seen in the Opera Rigoletto which received a South Bank Sky Arts Award as did ‘’[Uncle Vanya ] film and West End Production in 2022. Saint Joan, an Obie Award for Oliver Twist and an Irish Times award for An Ideal Husband. Smith was nominated for Laurence Olivier Awards for The Light Princess (for which she also received a WhatsOnStage Award nomination and made the Evening Standard shortlist), Uncle Vanya and Rosmersholm. Her work on the set of War Horse received particular praise and she received an Olivier, Tony, Evening Standard, Toronto Critics and Drama Desk Special Award. Smith has also worked on several operas and ballets.

== Theatre ==
Smith has often worked at the Royal National Theatre in London. Her plays there include Paradise, Translations, Macbeth, Pillars of the Community, The Veil, The Light Princess, Theatre of Blood, The Visit, The Seafarer, Saint Joan (for which she won a South Bank Sky Arts Award), Wonder.land and This House. Smith also worked on Barber Shop Chronicles at the National, the West Yorkshire Playhouse and on a world tour. Smith followed The Veil to the West End and The Light Princess on a world tour. For the latter play she was nominated for a Laurence Olivier Award for best costume design, a WhatsOnStage Awards nomination for best set designer and made the Evening Standard short list for best design.

In the West End Smith has worked on Walden, Uncle Vanya, Rosmersholm, The Goat, or Who Is Sylvia?, This House and The Street of Crocodiles. Smith received Laurence Olivier Award nominations for Uncle Vanya and Rosmersholm. She followed Girl from the North Country from the West End to The Public Theater and then to Broadway. Other theatre work includes Nightfall at the Bridge and The Lion, the Witch and the Wardrobe at the West Yorkshire Playhouse at Stella at the Brighton Festival, Hoxton Hall, and the Holland Festival. Smith worked off-Broadway on the set and costume design for Oliver Twist, for which she won an Obie Award, and in Ireland on An Ideal Husband, for which she received an Irish Times award for best costume.

Smith also worked as set designer on War Horse, a stage adaptation of Michael Morpurgo's novel about a horse on the Western Front of the First World War. To prepare for the role Smith spent weeks pretending to be a British Army captain, in a manner similar to that of method acting. As part of the process she reviewed personal recollections, photographs and archives from the period, held at the Imperial War Museum. Smith's set for the play was praised for its dynamism. A key theme was the use of the backdrop as a giant sheet of paper from one of the characters sketchbooks, onto which she projected images that might have been drawn by the character. The set design won Smith an Olivier, Tony, Evening Standard, Toronto Critics and Drama Desk Special Awards.

== Opera and ballet ==
Smith has also worked on operas including The Marriage of Figaro at the Aix-en-Provence Festival, Pelléas and Mélisande for the Scottish Opera, Benvenuto Cellini for the English National Opera, and Cavalleria rusticana and Pagliacci for the Metropolitan Opera, New York. Smith's set for Der Ring des Nibelungen for the Opéra national du Rhin won a Grand Prix for Outstanding Achievement in Opera.

Smith has also worked in ballet, including Dance: The Tempest and The Prince of the Pagodas at the Birmingham Royal Ballet and The Rite of Spring and Petrushka for the Fabulous Beast company.
