= Kindred Spirit (band) =

English musical duo

- Origin: London, England
- Genres: Pop, acoustic, folk
- Years active: 1991–1996
- Label: IRS Records
- Past members: Debbi Peterson; Siobhan Maher; Gina Schock

Kindred Spirit was a female duo consisting of Debbi Peterson (drummer/vocalist of the Bangles) and Siobhan Maher (vocalist of the River City People).

== History ==
When the Bangles broke up in 1989, Debbi Peterson formed Smashbox with Gina Schock (of the Go-Go's), Sara Lee (of the B-52's) and Wendy & Lisa. By 1991, the group was reduced to Peterson and Schock, who signed with I.R.S. Records and renamed themselves Kindred Spirit.

After recording with producer Humberto Gatica, Schock departed and was replaced by Siobhan Maher, who had just split with her group, the River City People. In late 1992, Kindred Spirit released the single "Here in My Eyes" in Europe and went on tour as the opening act for Joan Armatrading.

Their debut album was slated for release in early 1993 and included material co-written by Peterson and Schock. Schock sued, filing a lawsuit to "regain control of her material" The lengthy legal battle put the album on hold and it wasn't released until 1995, preceded by a single, "Ask Me No Questions".

The album, produced by Peterson and Maher, is a collection of acoustic and pop-rock songs. As with the Bangles tradition, Peterson and Maher wrote their songs separately, singing lead vocals in their own songs and harmony vocals on the other's. The only song co-written by Schock included in the album was the single "Here in My Eyes".

In December 1995, the band's song "Christmas Son" was included on a Christmas compilation album.

In 1996, IRS Records went bankrupt and the duo parted ways. Debbi Peterson rejoined the Bangles in 1999, who re-recorded "Ask Me No Questions" for their 2003 album Doll Revolution. Siobhan Maher released a solo album, Immigrant Flower, in 2002.

== Discography ==
=== Albums ===
- Kindred Spirit (1995, IRS)

=== Singles ===
- "Here in My Eyes" (1992, IRS)
- "Ask Me No Questions" (1994, IRS)

=== Compilation appearances ===
- Mother & Child (A Christmas Celebration of Motherhood) (1995, IRS)
