= River City People =

English folk rock band

River City People were a folk rock quartet formed in Liverpool, England, in 1986, by vocalist Siobhan Maher, guitarist Tim Speed, his drummer brother Paul Speed, and bassist Dave Snell. Siobhan, Tim and Dave had all been with Liverpool Band "Peep Show" until summer 1987 – at one point both bands co-existed. The group appeared on Channel 4's The Chart Show and soon afterward signed with EMI, releasing their debut single "(What's Wrong with) Dreaming?" in mid-1989. Their album Say Something Good followed a few months later, recorded in Los Angeles and produced by Don Gehman. In the summer of 1990, the band scored their biggest hit single with a cover of The Mamas & the Papas' "California Dreamin'", a double A-side with "Carry the Blame", reaching number 13 in the UK singles chart. This Is the World followed as a single in late 1991, but the group disbanded shortly after.

Maher then teamed with ex-Bangle Debbi Peterson in the duo Kindred Spirit, releasing a self-titled 1995 album on I.R.S. Records. She released a solo album in 2002 called Immigrant Flower.

After River City People disbanded, the two brothers, Paul and Tim, formed the band Speed.

== Discography ==
=== Albums ===
- Say Something Good (1990) UK #23
- This Is the World (1991) UK #56
- (What's Wrong with) Dreaming – The Best Of (2006) (iTunes download only, includes previously unreleased tracks)

=== Singles ===
- "(What's Wrong with) Dreaming?" (1989) UK #70
- "Say Something Good" (1989)
- "Walking on Ice" (1990) UK #62
- "Carry the Blame" / "California Dreamin'" (1990) UK #13
- "(What's Wrong with) Dreaming?" (remix) (1990) UK #40
- "When I Was Young" (1991) UK #62
- "Special Way" (1991) UK #44
- "Standing in the Need of Love" (1992) UK #36
