= Siobhan Maher Kennedy =

English singer and songwriter (born 1964)

Siobhan Maher Kennedy (born 11 January 1964) is an English singer and songwriter. She was the lead vocalist of River City People, a band from Liverpool, during the late 1980s and early 1990s. The band released two albums, Say Something Good and This Is the World.

She is the daughter of Liverpool entertainer and BBC Radio Merseyside presenter Billy Maher.

== Musical career ==
In the 1980s, prior to joining River City People, Maher was a vocalist with the local bands Passion Polka, Peep Show (with future RCP bassist Dave Snell to whom she was briefly married) and The Persuaders (with future RCP drummer and co-founder Paul Speed).

After River City People split, Maher teamed with the rave act Oceanic for the single "Ignorance" after their regular singer Jorinde Williams lost her voice. "Ignorance" charted at number 72 on the Official UK Singles chart in November 1992 and is Maher Kennedy's only solo credited hit on the Official Charts database.

Two years later she formed a duo called Kindred Spirit with Debbi Peterson, drummer and vocalist with The Bangles who released a self-titled album in 1995. Although Peterson and Maher never officially split, Kindred Spirit is not active. Peterson returned to the Bangles and Maher released a solo album in 2002 titled Immigrant Flower.

Maher Kennedy lives in Nashville and married Ray Kennedy, a producer of Steve Earle and Malcolm Holcombe. She now styles herself Siobhan Maher Kennedy and her music is representative of country, folk, and Americana. On 29 May 2022, her single "God Bless The World" was No. 32 on the Top 40 of Mike Read's Heritage Chart.

== Other work ==
In 1987, Maher played the part of Lettuce in the Brookside spin-off series Damon and Debbie. She ventured into television presenting appearing on the 1987 series of the BBC1 fashion magazine programme The Clothes Show and the 1987 and 1988 seasons of But First This!, Children's BBC's summer holiday morning programme. For the 1987 season she presented a week solo (others doing the same included Andy Crane, Simon Potter; Tracy Brabin, who was a Member of Parliament; and Anthea Turner), and in 1988 presented throughout the run in rotation with other members of the presenting team for that season (Crane, Colin Heywood, and Sue Devaney).

Maher sang background vocals on Willy DeVille's 1996 Loup Garou album and the 1997 Joey Tempest album Azalea Place, and duetted with Steve Earle on the song "Poison Lovers" from his 1997 album El Corazón. Additionally, she performed backing vocals on several albums by Malcolm Holcombe including For The Mission Baby which came out in 2009. Maher also sang backing vocals on Manu Katché's album It's About Time, which was recorded at Real World Studios and featured Sting, Peter Gabriel, and Pino Palladino amongst others.

The 2002 BBC One comedy-drama Being April featured "I Want to See the Bright Lights Tonight," a theme song performed by Maher Kennedy and written by Richard Thompson. She appeared in an episode of the show performing the song, which is on her solo album Immigrant Flower. Inspired by the community of musicians and songwriters in Nashville, Maher Kennedy began a project in Liverpool in 2019 called The Liver Girls to pursue the creation of a similar collective of women singer-songwriters in her former home city.

== Discography ==
=== Solo recordings ===
- 2002: Immigrant Flower (BMG Records/Gravity Records)

=== With Kindred Spirit ===
- 1995: Kindred Spirit (I.R.S. Records)

=== With River City People ===
Albums

- 1989: Say Something Good (EMI Records)
- 1991 This Is the World (EMI)

Single(s)

- 1990: "California Dreaming" (EMI) cover of The Mamas & the Papas, available since the reissue of the Say Something Good album
