= The Light Princess (musical) =

2013 musical by Tori Amos

- The National Theatre's poster for The Light Princess musical featuring Rosalie Craig as the weightless princess Althea
- Music: Tori Amos
- Lyrics: Tori Amos; Samuel Adamson
- Book: Samuel Adamson
- Basis: The Light Princess fairy tale by George MacDonald
- Premiere: 9 October 2013: Lyttleton Theatre, Royal National Theatre, London
- Productions: 2013 London; 2018 London Concert

The Light Princess is a musical with music and lyrics by Tori Amos and a book by Samuel Adamson based on the Scottish fairy tale of the same name by George MacDonald.

The musical tells the story of a princess afflicted by a constant weightlessness, unable to get her feet on the ground, both literally and metaphorically, until she finds a love that brings her down to earth. It premiered at the Royal National Theatre in London in 2013. The stage production featured actress Rosalie Craig as the titular character. It was generally well-received, enjoyed an extended run in the theatre, and released its cast recording in 2015.

== Synopsis ==
The princess (now named Althea) loses her gravity and the ability to cry at age six, after her mother dies. Her father became a cold-hearted man after the loss of his wife. Their country Lagobel (which is rich in gold, but has no water) is at war with the neighboring Sealand (which has water, but no gold). When Althea's older brother is killed, her father tells her she must prepare to be queen, but she laughs and refuses, leading to a disheartened Lagobel army being slaughtered in battle with Sealand troops. Althea's father tries various cruel cures to find her gravity, and tries to force her into an arranged marriage so she can provide a child to be a more suitable future monarch, but she escapes and flees to the wilderness that separates Lagobel and Sealand. There she meets Sealand's prince, Digby, who has been unable to smile since the death of his mother. The two fall in love and conceive a child, but soon fight as Digby wants a more traditional life in a house, while Althea wants to live in the lake forever. Digby returns home, where his cruel father dams the lake in order to cut off Lagobel's water supply and kill all the people. Digby runs away from his own arranged marriage and breaks down the dam, but is nearly killed in the process, causing Althea to cry and therefore regain her gravity. The two get married and live happily ever after, Althea becoming a marine biologist and leaving the running of the country to her female prime minister.

Adamson and Amos' story version was released in a paperback edition including the full script and lyrics.

== Music ==
The music was composed by Tori Amos. The original cast recording features 30 original recordings by the cast plus three bonus tracks, including two performed by Amos.

The musical numbers are as follows:

- "Prologue: Once Upon A Time" – Company
- "My Own Land" – Company
- "My Fairy Story" – Althea & Piper
- "Queen Material" – Company
- "Sealand Supremacy" – Company
- "Zephyrus Call & Levity" – Althea & Digby
- "Althea" – Althea & Digby
- "Scandal" – Company
- "The Gauntlet" – Company
- "Better Than Good" – Company
- "The Solution" – Company
- "Highness in the Sky" – Digby
- "Proverbs & Let the Bells Ring & God, the Horror" – Althea & Piper
- "No H2O" – Company
- "Zephyrus Call Reprise" – Digby
- "Darkest Hour" – Althea
- "After Darkest Hour" – Althea & Digby
- "Amphibiava" – Althea & Digby
- "Tinkle, Drizzle, Bubble, and Gush" – Company
- "Nothing More Than This, Part One" – Company
- "Part Two: Queen of the Lake" – Company
- "Drought" – Company
- "The Whistleblower" – Company
- "My Little Girl's Smile" – Company
- "Bitter Fate" – Company
- "The Wedding" – Company
- "Crash in the Universe" – Company
- "Tears" – Althea
- "Gravity & Epilogue: Once Upon a Time" – Company
- "Coronation" – Company

=== Cast recording ===
A cast album of the 2013 London production was released in October 2015 by Universal/Mercury Classics. The album was produced by songwriter and composer Tori Amos, recorded during 2014 at different stops during her Unrepentant Geraldines Tour in support of her own album. Amos' tour team, including Mark Hawley and Marcel van Limbeek, engineered the cast album throughout the tour, having recorded the orchestra in April and met up with the different cast members "as they were available". It contains all 33 tracks from the show and also features exclusive bonus tracks sung by Amos. Amos expressed she was happy to be able to give The Light Princess a cast recording under these terms, because so many theatre musicals no longer get an album release because of the expense and logistics involved.

== Production history ==
=== National Theatre world premiere (2013–14) ===
In 2013, the National Theatre produced a musical staging of the story. The production was directed by Marianne Elliott, designed by Rae Smith, orchestrated by John Philip Shenale, lighting designed by Paule Constable and choreographed by Stephen Hoggett.

It was initially expected to premiere in London in April 2012, it was announced in October 2011 that the production would be delayed until later in the year.

Rosalie Craig as "Althea" and Nick Hendrix as "Digby". Wires, acrobatics and optical illusions were used to give the Light Princess the appearance of always floating in air. Craig's performance and the production design were universally applauded by critics.

The musical began previewing in the Lyttleton Theatre from 25 September 2013, with an official opening on 9 October starring Rosalie Craig in the titular role who was subsequently singled out as a stand-out performance. Craig was nominated for many awards, and ultimately won the Evening Standard's award for best actress in a musical. The choreography, lighting, set design, music (Amos) and other cast performances were also lauded and nominated for a range of awards.

The production completed its run on 2 February 2014. Amos stated that the production team had ambitions of bringing The Light Princess to American Broadway, but expressed worry that the original National Theatre production might not be commercial enough for the American audience.

On creating the musical, Amos stated:

"It wasn't commercial theater, so from the top down they (the National Theatre) said to us, do not dumb this down. You be brave, you be bold, you be confrontational. Sam and I said, well, this is a feminist fairy tale, and not everyone will be comfortable with it. It's not always going to make everyone feel warm and fuzzy. It brings up confrontations between teenagers and their parents, that would resonate in the 21st century [...] The Light Princess has to be something that kids can come see, because it is a story of a teenage girl. It might be a little dark for some. But we found that there were kids that were completely entranced. And even though sometimes it got scary, they stayed with the story."

Selected tracks from the musical is available for streaming from the National Theatre, including "My Fairy Story", "Althea", "Amphibiava" and "Better Than Good".

Another stage adaption was done to the fairy tale by a Massachusetts director, Emily C. A. Snyder.

=== Cadogan Hall Concert (2018) ===
On 1 July 2018 Alex Parker and Club 11 staged a concert performance of the musical at Cadogan Hall in London. It starred Rosalie Craig returning to the role of Althea, Craig's husband Hadley Fraser as Prince Digby, Trevor Dion Nicholas as King Darius, Gabrielle Brooks as Piper, Louis Maskell as Llewelyn, Norman Bowman as King Ignacio, Anna-Jane Casey as Sergeant at Arms, Laura Pitt-Pulford as Falconer and David Langham as Mr Flowers. Both Tori Amos and Samuel Anderson attended the concert who both joined in the rapturous standing ovation at the end of the performance.

== Critical reception ==
The musical received generally positive reviews, with the majority of critics praising Craig's spectacular lead performance, the strong ensemble cast, the vivid and rich set design by Rae Smith, and the elaborate, imaginative choreography used to create the illusion of Althea floating in air. The script by Adamson and music by Amos, however, divided critics. Professional critic ratings of the musical ranged the full spectrum from 1 to 5 stars, though more often complimentary than not.

Many reviewers found the musical to be a fantastic and unusual fairytale with unafraid scope and smarts. The Independent gave it a 4-star review, calling it a "bewitchingly unusual evening walking on air". Time Out likewise gave it 4 stars, saying it was "a visual and technical tour de force with a title performance from Rosalie Craig that’ll blow your mind and melt your heart." Another 4 star review came from What's On Stage, calling it an "unusual and delightful surprise" with an excellent ensemble led by a Craig in "one of the most extraordinary, vocally resourceful and physically triumphant performances ever seen in musical theatre.". The Evening Standard gave 4 stars, finding the musical "worth the wait" and a showcase for Amos as an artist and songwriter, with a stunningly good performance by Craig and gorgeous set design by Smith. Metro likewise gave 4 stars, with splendid music by Amos and fantastic production, but ultimately being blown away by Craig as Althea, concluding with "a star is born." Simon Edge of The Daily Express gave the musical its best review, a perfect score of 5 stars, calling it a "feast for the eyes", with a "staggeringly good" lead performance by Craig, stirring and sweet music by Amos, and ultimately finding that "this bonkers but beautiful fantasy defies categorisation". Edge stated:

"Every so often you see something in the theatre so arresting, so unlike anything you’ve seen before, that you want to grab strangers in the street and tell them to book tickets [...] Bonkers, dazzling, lyrical, fun and sweet - Tori Amos's musical is a wonderful, unforgettable feast for the senses [...] All I know is I'd go again tomorrow, and again the day after that."

Other reviewers were mixed in their critiques, most often founding the musical too unfocused, its script overtly preachy for adults, and the music not memorable enough. The Telegraph gave a 3-star review, praising Craig's performance, but finding the narrative "preachy" and Amos' music lacking in standout numbers. London Theatre gave another 3 stars, calling the musical "visually ravishing" with a brilliant cast and occasionally haunting music by Amos, but overall deeming it an "honourable, interesting misfire". The Guardian's review gave the musical 2 stars, citing a lack of emotional punch, finding Amos' score sometimes bland, and Adamson's narrative too meandering. The Stage enjoyed the set production, the superb ensemble and Amos' rich music, but felt the story might fail to capture any specific audience group, being perhaps too complex for children and too earnest for adults. The Huffington Post concluded that its flaws "cannot dim the magic of The Light Princess." Financial Times gave a 3-star review, stating that cluttered content was weighing an otherwise "daring, beautiful and original" musical down. The Arts Desk gave 3 stars, citing more great choreography than real chemistry, not enjoying Amos' music and lyrics. Variety found fault with the music as well, stating a tendency to ramble, but called Craig's performance "career-making" and intense.
