= Rosalie Craig =

English actress (born 1981)

Rosalie Mae Craig
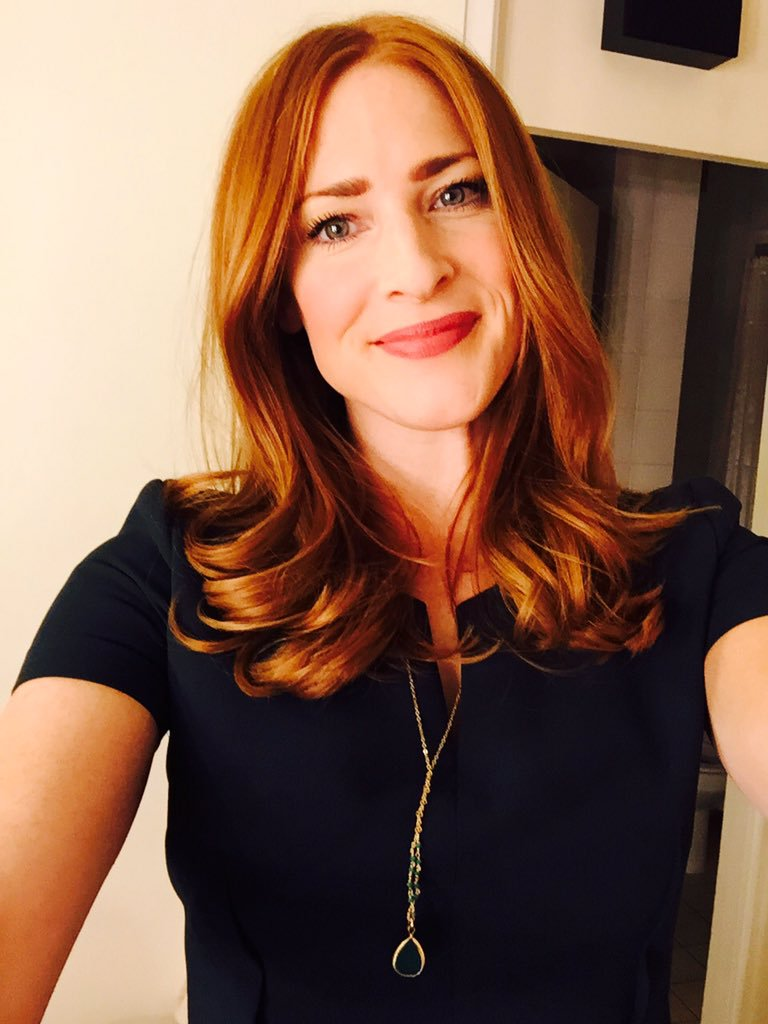
- Craig in 2015
- Born: 30 May 1981 (age 45); Nottingham, Nottinghamshire, England
- Education: Rose Bruford College (BA)
- Occupation: Actress
- Years active: 2001–present
- Known for: The Light Princess; Company; Riot Women
- Spouse: Hadley Fraser (m. 2014)
- Children: 1

Rosalie Mae Craig (born 30 May 1981) is an English actress, noted for her performances in musical theatre. In 2013, she received her first major award, a London Evening Standard Award for Best Performance in a Musical. In 2025 she took the lead in the BBC drama Riot Women.

== Early life and education ==
Craig was born, and grew up, in Nottingham. She studied for a BA in Actor Musicianship at Rose Bruford College, from which she graduated in 2001.

== Career ==
=== Stage ===
After graduation Craig joined the Royal Shakespeare Company and made her professional stage debut in an adaptation by Adrian Mitchell of Alice in Wonderland.

In 2007 she had her first leading role in a West End production, playing the character Arwen in the musical stage adaptation of The Lord of the Rings.

Since then her notable roles in theatre have included the title character in Tori Amos's The Light Princess at the National Theatre in 2013, for which she was nominated for an Olivier Award, as well as winning her first major award, a London Evening Standard Award for Best Performance in a Musical.

She appeared in the musical London Road at the National Theatre and subsequently in Rufus Norris's film adaptation. Craig's other work with the National Theatre include: As You Like It and The Threepenny Opera. She appeared in the premiere of musical Wonder.land, at Palace Theatre, Manchester for the Manchester International Festival; also directed by Norris in association with the National Theatre.

In September 2018 Craig began appearing alongside Patti LuPone in a revival of the Stephen Sondheim musical Company. She played the lead role of Bobbie, reimagined for the first time as a woman.

She also had leading parts in City of Angels (Donmar Warehouse), Finding Neverland (Leicester Curve) and Ragtime (Regent's Park Open Air Theatre).

=== Television ===
Craig's television work includes appearances in Spooks, a 2009 episode of Miranda, Endeavour, Lovesick, Midsomer Murders, Truth Seekers and The Queen's Gambit.

In 2021, Craig played the Whaletaur Shaman in Netflix's Centaurworld, and co-starred as Virginia Wilson in the Netflix series 1899 in 2022. In 2024, she portrayed Jeanne d'Albret in The Serpent Queen, and appeared in Moonflower Murders. Since 2025, Craig stars as Kitty Eckersley in the BBC television dramas Riot Women.

== Personal life ==
Craig married actor and musician Hadley Fraser on 5 October 2014. They have a daughter.

== Theatre credits ==
Year	Title	Role	Venue
2001	Alice in Wonderland	Lorina/Lory	Royal Shakespeare Company
2002	The Firebird	Vasilisa	Watermill Theatre
2002	Dreams from the Summerhouse	Belle	Watermill Theatre
2003	The Hired Man	May	Salisbury Playhouse
2004	Be My Baby	Mary	Oldham Coliseum Theatre
2005	The Translucent Frogs of Quup	Edith Marigold-Bentley	New Ambassadors Theatre
2006	Playing for Time	Marianne	Salisbury Playhouse
2006	Martha, Josie and the Chinese Elvis	Louise	Salisbury Playhouse
2006	Hobson's Choice	Alice	Watermill Theatre
2007/08	The Lord of the Rings	Arwen	Theatre Royal, Drury Lane
2009	A Christmas Carol	Mrs Cratchit	Birmingham Repertory Theatre
2010	Anyone Can Whistle	Fay Apple	Jermyn Street Theatre
2010	Aspects of Love	Giulietta Trapani	Menier Chocolate Factory
2010	Swallows and Amazons	Susan	Bristol Old Vic
2011	London Road	Helen	National Theatre, London
2011	Company	Marta	Sheffield Crucible
2012	Ragtime	Mother	Regent's Park Open Air Theatre
2012	Finding Neverland	Sylvia Llewelyn-Davies	Leicester Curve
2013	Hitchcock Blonde	Blonde	Hull Truck Theatre
2013/14	The Light Princess	Althea D'Arcy	National Theatre, London
2014	Miss Julie/Black Comedy	Miss Julie/Clea	Chichester Festival Theatre
2014	City of Angels	Gabby/Bobbi	Donmar Warehouse
2015	Sweeney Todd: The Demon Barber of Fleet Street	Beggar Woman	London Coliseum
2015	wonder.land	Alice	Palace Theatre, Manchester
2015	As You Like It	Rosalind	National Theatre, London
2016	The Threepenny Opera	Polly Peachum	National Theatre, London
2018	The Ferryman	Caitlin Carney	Gielgud Theatre, London
2018	Company	Bobbie	Gielgud Theatre, London
2020	City of Angels	Gabby/Bobbi	Garrick Theatre, London
2021/22	Hex	Fairy	National Theatre, London
2025	Good Night, Oscar	June Levant	Barbican Theatre, London

== Awards and nominations ==
Year	Award	Category	Work	Result	Ref
2013	Evening Standard Theatre Award	Best Musical Performance	The Light Princess	Won	
2014	Laurence Olivier Award	Best Actress in a Musical	The Light Princess	Nominated	
2014	WhatsOnStage Award	Best Actress in a Musical	The Light Princess	Nominated	
2014	BroadwayWorld UK Award	Best Leading Actress in a New Production of a Musical	The Light Princess	Nominated	
2015	Evening Standard Theatre Award	Best Musical Performance	City of Angels	Nominated	
2016	WhatsOnStage Award	Best Actress in a Play	As You Like It	Nominated	
2018	Evening Standard Theatre Award	Best Musical Performance	Company	Won	
2019	Laurence Olivier Award	Best Actress in a Musical	Company	Nominated	
2019	WhatsOnStage Award	Best Actress in a Musical	Company	Nominated	
