= Tim Pierce discography =

This is the discography for the American musician and session guitarist Tim Pierce, whose career spans more than four decades (2022).

- Acuérdate de Mí – Bertín Osborne (1974)
- Shandi – Shandi (1980)
- Harvest of Dreams – Bobb Trimble (1982)
- Ignition – John Waite (1982)
- "Runaway" – Bon Jovi (1982)
- Success Hasn't Spoiled Me Yet – Rick Springfield (1982)
- The Key – Joan Armatrading (1983)
- Living in Oz – Rick Springfield (1983)
- Tane Cain – Tane Cain (1983)
- Born & Raised (On Rock & Roll) – Beau Coup (1984)
- Bon Jovi – Bon Jovi (1984)
- Hard to Hold – Rick Springfield (1984)
- Vox Humana – Kenny Loggins (1985)
- Nature of the Beast – Maureen Steele (1985)
- Beat of the Drum – Rick Springfield (1985)
- Tao – Rick Springfield (1985)
- Crowded House – Crowded House (1986)
- Hands Across the Night – Ian Messenger (1986)
- Peter Case – Peter Case (1986)
- Heaven on Earth – Belinda Carlisle (1987)
- After Here Through Midland – Cock Robin (1987)
- I'm Only Fooling Myself – Eric Martin (1987)
- Back to Avalon – Kenny Loggins (1988)
- The Reckoning – Margaret Becker (1988)
- Rock of Life – Rick Springfield (1988)
- Notes from the Lost Civilization – Tonio K. (1988)
- Witness – Witness (1988)
- Heart Like a Gun – Fiona_(singer) (1989)
- One in a Million – Hiroko (1989)
- Can't Fight the Midnight – Jimmy Harnen (1989)
- Tim Finn – Tim Finn (1989)
- Tangled – Jane Wiedlin (1990)
- Brickyard Road – Johnny Van Zant (1990)
- A View from 3rd Street – Jude Cole (1990)
- Delusions of Grandeur – Kevin Raleigh (1990)
- Show Off – Lori Ruso (1990)
- I'm Breathless [Music from and Inspired by the Film Dick Tracy] – Madonna (1990)
- Balince: A Collection – Marty Balin (1990)
- Promesa De Amor – Ruly Aguirre (1990)
- Shortstop – Sara Hickman (1990)
- The Party – The Party (1990)
- Life Goes On – Tommy Puett (1990)
- Toy Matinee – Toy Matinee (1990)
- Arachnophobia [Original Soundtrack] – (1990)
- Bitterblue – Bonnie Tyler (1991)
- Anonymous Confessions of a Lunatic Friend – Bryan Duncan (1991)
- Too Tired to Sleep – Dirk Hamilton (1991)
- Leap of Faith – Kenny Loggins (1991)
- House of Hope – Toni Childs (1991)
- Vagabond Heart – Rod Stewart (1991)
- Dangerous – Michael Jackson (1991)
- Nicky Holland – Nicky Holland (1991)
- Truly Blessed – Teddy Pendergrass (1991)
- In the Meantime, In Between Time – The Party (1991)
- Love Talk – The Stylistics (1991)
- The Williams Brothers – The Williams Brothers (1991)
- Simply the Best – Tina Turner (1991)
- Will T. Massey – Will T. Massey (1991)
- All I Want for Christmas [Soundtrack] – (1991)
- World Falling Down – Peter Cetera (1992)
- Tiny Toons Sing – Tiny Toon Adventures (1992)
- Amused to Death – Roger Waters (1992)
- Rendez-vous – Christopher Cross (1992)
- Patty Smyth – Patty Smyth (1992)
- Human Touch – Bruce Springsteen (1992)
- The Power of One – Hans Zimmer (1992)
- Demons Down – House of Lords (1992)
- Pop Top – Jim Basnight (1992)
- Latin Street '92 – José Feliciano (1992)
- Start the Car – Jude Cole (1992)
- América & en Vivo – Luis Miguel (1992)
- A Different Man – Peter Kingsbery (1992)
- Treasures, Vol. 1 – Petula Clark (1992)
- Songs for My Best Friends – The Baby-Sitters Club (1992)
- A Very Special Christmas 2 – (1992)
- Attitude & Virtue – Corey Hart (1992)
- The Vanishing Race – Air Supply (1993)
- Real – Belinda Carlisle (1993)
- Vivir Una Vez – Brizuela (1993)
- Symphony or Damn – Terence Trent D'Arby (1993)
- The Colour of My Love – Céline Dion (1993)
- In Every Small Town – Clouseau (1993)
- Tuesdays Are Forever – D.D. Wood (1993)
- Donna De Lory – Donna De Lory (1993)
- A Buen Puerto – Eva Santa Maria (1993)
- Painted Desert Serenade – Joshua Kadison (1993)
- Bat Out of Hell II: Back into Hell – Meat Loaf (1993)
- Reach out to Me – Michael Damian (1993)
- Rumble Doll – Patti Scialfa (1993)
- Robert Vaughn & the Dead River Angels – Robert Vaughn (1993)
- Robin Zander – Robin Zander (1993)
- Do You Love Me Like You Say? – Terence Trent D'Arby (1993)
- What's Love Got to Do with It – Tina Turner (1993)
- Captain of the Ship – Tsuyoshi Nagabuchi (1993)
- Queen of the Night - Whitney Houston (1993)
- Meanwhile – 3rd Matinee (1994)
- Pasiones – Ednita Nazario (1994)
- Always – Freddy Cole (1994)
- Gems – Patti LaBelle (1994)
- Have a Little Faith – Joe Cocker (1994)
- In the Hot Seat – Emerson, Lake & Palmer (1994)
- Street Angel – Stevie Nicks (1994)
- Angels on the Faultline – Keith Chagall (1994)
- Santo Cachon – Los Embajadores Vallenatos (1994)
- Siempre Contigo – Lucero (1994)
- Mirando Hacia El Sur – Luis Angel (1994)
- Care of My Soul – Mark Spiro (1994)
- Mujeres – Marta Sánchez (1994)
- Time of the Season – Michael Damian (1994)
- Seo Taiji and Boys III - Seo Taiji and Boys (1994)
- Amanda Marshall – Amanda Marshall (1995)
- A Spanner in the Works – Rod Stewart (1995)
- If My Heart Had Wings – Melissa Manchester (1995)
- Am I Still in Your Heart – Chuck Negron (1995)
- Temple Bar – John Waite (1995)
- I Believe in Love Again – Lori Ruso (1995)
- Welcome to the Neighbourhood – Meat Loaf (1995)
- HIStory: Past, Present and Future, Book I – Michael Jackson (1995)
- A Medio Vivir – Ricky Martin (1995)
- Navidad, Tu y Yo – The Barrio Boyzz (1995)
- New Wave – The Challengers (1995)
- Don't Ask – Tina Arena (1995)
- Playback – Tom Petty / Tom Petty & the Heartbreakers (1995)
- The Mighty Morphin Power Rangers [Original Soundtrack] – (1995)
- The Message – 4Him (1996)
- Amanda Marshall – Amanda Marshall (1996)
- Vivencias – Ana Gabriel (1996)
- Falling into You – Céline Dion (1996)
- Wildest Dreams – Tina Turner (1996)
- Off the Beaten Path – Dave Koz (1996)
- Well – David Grow (1996)
- Someone Who Cares – David Robertson (1996)
- Qué Será De Mí – Flavio Cesar (1996)
- France – France Gall (1996)
- Back Room Blood – Gerry Goffin (1996)
- Somewhere Under Heaven – Jamie Slocum (1996)
- Feels So Good – Lina Santiago (1996)
- Now Is Then, Then Is Now – Mark Spiro (1996)
- Amigos – Paul Anka (1996)
- Lost in Reality – Player (1996)
- Kissing Rain – Roch Voisine (1996)
- If We Fall in Love Tonight – Rod Stewart (1996)
- The Hypocrite – Ryan Downe (1996)
- 25 de Diciembre – Simone (1996)
- Back to the World – Tevin Campbell (1996)
- Sahara Snow - Rick Springfield, Tim Pierce and Bob Marlette (1997)
- The Unimaginable Life – Kenny Loggins (1997)
- Freedom – Sheena Easton (1997)
- Let's Talk About Love – Céline Dion (1997)
- Dans ma chair – Patricia Kaas (1997)
- Ride – Jamie Walters (1997)
- Across from Midnight – Joe Cocker (1997)
- Bathhouse Betty – Bette Midler (1998)
- "Iris" – Goo Goo Dolls (1998)
- Naked Without You – Taylor Dayne (1998)
- Somewhere In The Middle (album) – Eric Martin (1998)
- No Ordinary World – Joe Cocker (1999)
- Telling Stories – Tracy Chapman (2000)
- Bette – Bette Midler (2000)
- Ronan – Ronan Keating (2000)
- Inside Job – Don Henley (2000)
- Scream If You Wanna Go Faster – Geri Halliwell (2001)
- You Don't Wanna – Tricky (2001)
- Laundry Service – Shakira (2001)
- Trouble in Shangri-La – Stevie Nicks (2001)
- Destination – Ronan Keating (2002)
- (2) – Olivia Newton-John (2002)
- Respect Yourself – Joe Cocker (2002)
- Cry – Faith Hill (2002)
- Testify - Phil Collins (2002)
- All About Love – Steven Curtis Chapman (2003)
- Seal – Seal (2003)
- One Heart – Céline Dion (2003)
- Thankful – Kelly Clarkson (2003)
- Anastacia – Anastacia (2004)
- Blue Skies – Diana DeGarmo (2004)
- Stronger Than Before – Olivia Newton-John (2005)
- The Moment – Lisa Stansfield (2005)
- Marcas de Ayer – Adriana Mezzadri (2005)
- Polvo de Estrellas – Alberto Plaza (2005)
- Into the Rush – Aly & AJ (2005)
- Pieces of a Dream – Anastacia (2005)
- 100 – Andy Stochansky (2005)
- See the Sun – Black Lab (2005)
- Covering the Bases – Bronson Arroyo (2005)
- Crowded House/Temple of Low Men – Crowded House (2005)
- Second First Impression – Daniel Bedingfield (2005)
- Hurricane – Eric Benét (2005)
- Hope 7 – Hope 7 (2005)
- Unpredictable – Jamie Foxx (2005)
- Red Rocks Platinum – John Tesh (2005)
- RENT [Original Motion Picture Soundtrack] – Jonathan Larson (2005)
- Feel the Spirit – Na Leo Pilimehana (2005)
- Unwritten – Natasha Bedingfield (2005)
- Prince of Darkness – Ozzy Osbourne (2005)
- Ronan Keating – Ronan Keating (2005)
- All That I Am – Santana (2005)
- Sissi Enamorada – Sissi (2005)
- Spin – Steve Cole (2005)
- Susie Suh – Susie Suh (2005)
- Dancing on Tables Barefoot – Tara Blaise (2005)
- Buoni O Cattvi – Vasco Rossi (2005)
- PopJazz – Warren Hill (2005)
- Beautiful to Be Alive – Zoë Scott (2005)
- The Christmas Album – Michael Damian (2005)
- Mind How You Go – Skye Edwards (2006)
- Awake – Josh Groban (2006)
- Right Where You Want Me – Jesse McCartney (2006)
- Goodbye Alice in Wonderland – Jewel (2006)
- Love Is My Religion – Ziggy Marley (2006)
- Still the Same... Great Rock Classics of Our Time – Rod Stewart (2006)
- Acoustic Hearts of Winter – Aly & AJ (2006)
- Soundtrack to Your Life – Ashley Parker Angel (2006)
- Chronicles – Bon Jovi (2006)
- Siren – Breanna Lynn (2006)
- An Other Cup – Cat Stevens / Yusuf (2006)
- Le Miroir – Chimène Badi (2006)
- The Shabbat Lounge – Craig Taubman (2006)
- One People – Debbie Friedman (2006)
- Let Love In – Goo Goo Dolls (2006)
- Closer to the Sun – Guy Sebastian (2006)
- Huecco – Huecco (2006)
- Something About You, Pt. 1 – Jamelia (2006)
- Walk with Me – Jamelia (2006)
- Only One Too – Jewel (2006)
- Gold – Joe Cocker (2006)
- So This Is It – Kim Dexter (2006)
- Io Canto – Laura Pausini (2006)
- Maria Lawson – Maria Lawson (2006)
- Fundamental – Pet Shop Boys (2006)
- I Care – Rachelle Ann Go (2006)
- We Are the '80s – Rick Springfield (2006)
- Royalush – Royalush (2006)
- Becoming – Sarah Geronimo (2006)
- Tightrope – Stephanie McIntosh (2006)
- Midnight Rendezvous – Steve Madaio (2006)
- The Secret Life Of... – The Veronicas (2006)
- Bird on a Wire – Toby Lightman (2006)
- I Will – Tracy Lyons (2006)
- V – Vanessa Hudgens (2006)
- Aura – Yvonne Catterfeld (2006)
- Fly – Zucchero (2006)
- Ho: A Dan Band Christmas – The Dan Band (2006)
- Christmas Pop – (2006)
- East of Angel Town – Peter Cincotti (2007)
- Life in Cartoon Motion – Mika (2007)
- The Best Damn Thing – Avril Lavigne (2007)
- Beowulf [Music from the Motion Picture] – Alan Silvestri (2007)
- Insomniatic – Aly & AJ (2007)
- Motown: A Journey Through Hitsville USA – Boyz II Men (2007)
- Where I've Always Been – Brock Hillman (2007)
- Top Dog – Buck McCoy (2007)
- Por Capricho – Claudia Brant (2007)
- Set the Mood – David Jordan (2007)
- La Mujer Que Hay en Mí – Diana Mor (2007)
- Caterpillar – Elisa (2007)
- E^{2} – Eros Ramazzotti (2007)
- Closer to the Sun/The Memphis Album – Guy Sebastian (2007)
- Piece of Magic – Hannah Lindroth (2007)
- Hannah Montana 2: Meet Miley Cyrus – Hannah Montana (2007)
- Something About You – Jamelia (2007)
- Treasure Planet [Original Motion Picture Score] – James Newton Howard (2007)
- Human – Jeff Austin Black (2007)
- Jessica Callahan – Jessica Callahan (2007)
- Indiana – Jon McLaughlin (2007)
- Jonas Brothers – Jonas Brothers (2007
- Behind These Eyes – Justin Lanning (2007)
- We Are One – Kelly Sweet (2007)
- Based on a True Story – Kimberley Locke (2007)
- Bloodsport [Original Motion Picture Soundtrack] – Paul Hertzog (2007)
- Famous – Puddle of Mudd (2007)
- Obsession – Rachelle Ann Go (2007)
- Wines & Spirits – Rahsaan Patterson (2007)
- Bee Movie [Music from the Motion Picture] – Rupert Gregson-Williams (2007)
- Ultimate Santana – Santana (2007)
- Ultra Payloaded – Satellite Party (2007)
- Nouvelle Vague – Sylvie Vartan (2007)
- TCG – The Cheetah Girls (2007)
- Hersey Sensin – Yalin (2007)
- Give US Your Poor – (2007)
- Jazz Club: Jazz for the Road – (2007)
- Moondance Alexander – (2007)
- P.S. I Love You [Original Motion Picture Soundtrack] – (2007)
- Teen Witch: The Musical – (2007)
- In the Swing of Christmas – Barry Manilow (2007)
- Let's Talk About Love/Celine Dion – Céline Dion (2008)
- Gavin DeGraw – Gavin DeGraw (2008)
- I Came Around – Amie Miriello (2008)
- The Greatest Songs of the Eighties – Barry Manilow (2008)
- Coming to Terms – Carolina Liar (2008)
- Uncle Charlie – Charlie Wilson (2008)
- David Archuleta – David Archuleta (2008)
- David Cook – David Cook (2008)
- Don't Forget – Demi Lovato (2008)
- Pass It Around – Donavon Frankenreiter (2008)
- Echo Jet – Echo Jet (2008)
- Dancing – Elisa (2008)
- Assalto – Huecco (2008)
- Crazy Love – Jackie Bristow (2008)
- Evolver – John Legend (2008)
- OK Now – Jon McLaughlin (2008)
- Break the Silence – Jon Peter Lewis (2008)
- Permission To Fly – Jordan Pruitt (2008)
- I Choose You – Laura Wight (2008)
- Monglong – Lee Seung Hwan (2008)
- Il Diario di Lola – Lola Ponce (2008)
- In Precious Age – Mari Hamada (2008)
- I'll Be the One – Mark Bautista (2008)
- King of Pop – Michael Jackson (2008)
- Heat – Michael Lington (2008)
- Breakout – Miley Cyrus (2008)
- Natalia Lesz – Natalia Lesz (2008)
- Deeper Life/Stronger – Natalie Grant (2008)
- Natalie Grant Collector's Edition – Natalie Grant (2008)
- Whiskey Mornings – Pat Dailey (2008)
- East of Angel Town – Peter Cincotti (2008)
- Holding on to Love – Raquel Aurilia (2008)
- Step Outside – Saith (2008)
- The Sound of Madness – Shinedown (2008)
- The Archies Christmas Party – The Archies (2008)
- The Spirit of Christmas [Collector's Edition] – The Spirit Of Christmas (2008)
- Three Graces – Three Graces (2008)
- Tina! – Tina Turner (2008)
- Cradlesong – Rob Thomas (2009)
- The Boy Who Knew Too Much – Mika (2009)
- Safe and Sound - Kyosuke Himuro featuring Gerard Way (2009)
- The Ugly Truth [Original Motion Picture Soundtrack] – Aaron Zigman (2009)
- For Your Entertainment – Adam Lambert (2009)
- BHB – Ballas Hough Band (2009)
- Moving Forward – Bernie Williams (2009)
- Streelight Lullabies – Brandon White (2009)
- Let's Talk About Love/A New Day Has Come – Céline Dion (2009)
- Mr. Lucky – Chris Isaak (2009)
- Breakthrough – Colbie Caillat (2009)
- Big Whiskey & the GrooGrux King – Dave Matthews / Dave Matthews Band (2009)
- My Kind of Christmas – Dean Martin (2009)
- Gloriana – Gloriana (2009)
- 2012 [Original Score] – Harald Kloser / Thomas Wander (2009)
- Kate Pazakis Unzipped: Live at the Zipper – Kate Pazakis (2009)
- Kris Allen – Kris Allen (2009)
- Rock On – Michael Damian (2009)
- Vivir Así – Mijares (2009)
- Uno No Es Uno – Noel Schajris (2009)
- Kiss & Tell – Selena Gomez / Selena Gomez & the Scene (2009)
- Tri-Polar – Sick Puppies (2009)
- Happy Hour – Uncle Kracker (2009)
- A Very Special Christmas 7 – (2009)
- Hard Knocks – Joe Cocker (2010)
- Some Kind of Trouble – James Blunt (2010)
- We've All Been There – Alex Band (2010)
- The Greatest Love Songs of All Time – Barry Manilow (2010)
- Tour Box – Bon Jovi (2010)
- Brendan James – Brendan James (2010)
- A Thousand Different Ways/Measure of a Man – Clay Aiken (2010)
- Best of Me – Daniel Powter (2010)
- Shoot for the Stars – Dwight Howard (2010)
- Jason Castro – Jason Castro (2010)
- Supernatural, Seasons 1-5 [Original Television Soundtrack] – Jay Gruska / Christopher Lennertz (2010)
- Rage and Ruin – Jimmy Barnes (2010)
- Hang Cool Teddy Bear – Meat Loaf (2010)
- Can't Be Tamed – Miley Cyrus (2010)
- Born Again – Newsboys (2010)
- Pull – Mr. Mister (2010)
- Out of My Chelle – Rachelle Spector (2010)
- Nothing Like This – Rascal Flatts (2010)
- Someday – Rob Thomas (2010)
- 11:59 – Ryan Star (2010)
- Guitar Heaven: The Greatest Guitar Classics of All Time – Santana (2010)
- A Year Without Rain – Selena Gomez / Selena Gomez & the Scene (2010)
- Page One – Steven Page (2010)
- Sinner or a Saint – Tamar Kaprelian (2010)
- The Band Perry – The Band Perry (2010)
- World Gone Crazy – The Doobie Brothers (2010)
- What's Love Got To Do with It/Foreign Affair – Tina Turner (2010)
- Radio the World – TruWorship (2010)
- Songs from the Playhouse – TruWorship (2010)
- Happy Hour: The South River Road Sessions – Uncle Kracker (2010)
- Inusual – Yuri (2010)
- From the Heart: Coffee House Edition – (2010)
- Christmas Is the Time to Say I Love You – Katharine McPhee (2010)
- Il Volo – Il Volo (2011)
- Ghost on the Canvas – Glen Campbell (2011)
- Happen Again – Andy Kim (2011)
- 15 Minutes (FAME... Can You Take It?) – Barry Manilow (2011)
- The Essential Céline Dion – Céline Dion (2011)
- All of You – Colbie Caillat (2011)
- One Day – David Burnham (2011)
- This Loud Morning – David Cook (2011)
- Rock the Tabla – Hossam Ramzy (2011)
- People and Things – Jack's Mannequin (2011)
- Marconi – Marconi (2011)
- Matthew Morrison – Matthew Morrison (2011)
- Believe – Nick Swisher (2011)
- Negociaré Con La Pena – Pepe Aguilar (2011)
- Formula, Vol. 1 – Romeo Santos (2011)
- American Idol Season 10 Highlights – Scotty McCreery (2011)
- Clear as Day – Scotty McCreery (2011)
- When the Sun Goes Down – Selena Gomez / Selena Gomez & the Scene (2011)
- Vivere o Niente – Vasco Rossi (2011)
- Ximena Sariñana – Ximena Sariñana (2011)
- American Idol: 10th Anniversary: The Hits, Vol. 1 – (2011)
- A Very Special Christmas, Vols. 1-2 – (2011)
- Fire It Up – Joe Cocker (2012)
- Havoc and Bright Lights – Alanis Morissette (2012)
- Turn On the Lights – Daniel Powter (2012)
- Fires – Ronan Keating (2012)
- It's a Man's World – Anastacia (2012)
- Somos – Eros Ramazzotti (2012)
- A Thousand Miles Left Behind – Gloriana (2012)
- Love Is a Four Letter Word – Jason Mraz (2012)
- Born to Die – Lana Del Rey (2012)
- Paradise – Lana Del Rey (2012)
- Into the Wild: Live at Eastwest Studios – LP (2012)
- Electra Heart – Marina and the Diamonds (2012)
- Vladivostok – Mumiy Troll (2012)
- Nathan Pacheco – Nathan Pacheco (2012)
- Songs for the End of the World – Rick Springfield (2012)
- Amaryllis – Shinedown (2012)
- The Crossing – Sophie B. Hawkins (2012)
- Habítame Siempre – Thalía (2012)
- Lead with Your Heart – The Tenors (2012)
- 100 Year Anniversary of Fenway Park – (2012)
- Rock of Ages [Original Motion Picture Soundtrack] – (2012)
- Ultimate Christmas Collection – Chicago (2012)
- Christmas in the Sand – Colbie Caillat (2012)
- All That Echoes – Josh Groban (2013)
- Head on a String – Adam Jensen (2013)
- Hazard of the Die – Andy Palmer (2013)
- Dos Orillas – Antonio Orozco (2013)
- The Fight – Curtis Peoples (2013)
- Baptized – Daughtry (2013)
- What a Life – Erin Boheme (2013)
- Magnetic – Goo Goo Dolls (2013)
- Proof of Life – Scott Stapp (2013)
- Connect – Sick Puppies (2013)
- Heartthrob – Tegan and Sara (2013)
- Melody Road – Neil Diamond (2014)
- R-Kive – Genesis (2014)
- Rester Vivant – Johnny Hallyday (2014)
- Forever for Now – LP (2014)
- A Life Worth Living – Marc Broussard (2014)
- Rewind – Rascal Flatts (2014)
- Exotica – Roxanna (2014)
- Corazón – Santana (2014)
- For You – Selena Gomez (2014)
- Smokey & Friends – Smokey Robinson (2014)
- Love Songs – Tina Turner (2014)
- The Organisation of Pop: 30 Years of Zang Tuum Tumb – (2014)
- One Christmas: Chapter One – LeAnn Rimes (2014)
- The Great Unknown – Rob Thomas (2015)
- Piece by Piece – Kelly Clarkson (2015)
- A Gift of Love – Bette Midler (2015)
- After It All – Delta Rae (2015)
- I'll Be Me [Original Soundtrack] – Glen Campbell (2015)
- El Amor – Gloria Trevi (2015)
- Grande Amore – Il Volo (2015)
- Fountain and Vine – Sara Niemietz (2015)
- Revival – Selena Gomez (2015)
- All-American Boy – Steve Grand (2015)
- School of Rock: The Musical [Original Broadway Cast] – (2015)
- Encore: Movie Partners Sing Broadway – Barbra Streisand (2016)
- Encore un soir – Céline Dion (2016)
- Constellation – Chris Mann (2016)
- Playlist – Geri Halliwell (2016)
- Eccomi – Patty Pravo (2016)
- Rocket Science – Rick Springfield (2016)
- Rita Wilson – Rita Wilson (2016)
- Black Cat – Zucchero (2016)
- Acoustic Christmas – Neil Diamond (2016)
- Unleash the Love – Mike Love (2017)
- Inside a Dream – Echosmith (2017)
- Rainbow – Kesha (2017)
- Songs of Cinema – Michael Bolton (2017)
- Travel Light – Sara Niemietz (2017)
- An Echosmith Christmas – Echosmith (2017)
- Safe in The Arms of Mine – Rita Coolidge (2018)
- Bridges – Josh Groban (2018)
- Walls – Barbra Streisand (2018)
- Immortal – Ann Wilson (2018)
- Bye Bye – Annalisa (2018)
- Pete The Cat – Pete The Cat (2018)
- The Snake King – Rick Springfield (2018)
- Traces – Steve Perry (2018)
- Icarus Falls – ZAYN (2018)
- Motown Magic [Original Soundtrack] – (2018)
- War in My Mind – Beth Hart (2019)
- Musica – Il Volo (2019)
- Ascend – Illenium (2019)
- Echo – Keiko Matsui (2019)
- All about – Gregor Morley (2022)
