= Blue Skies (Diana DeGarmo album) =

Studio album by Diana DeGarmo
- Released: December 7, 2004
- Recorded: May–August 2004
- Studios: The Location and Ringside Studios (Stockholm, Sweden): MixStar Studios (Virginia Beach, Virginia); Woodland Ranch Studios (Woodland Hills, California); Ocean Studios (Burbank, California); Record Plant, Henson Studios and Ocean Way Recording (Hollywood, California); Royaltone Studios (North Hollywood, California); Chartmaker Studios (Malibu, California); Mix This! (Pacific Palisades, California)
- Genre: Pop
- Length: 42:54
- Label: RCA
- Producers: Clive Davis: Andreas Carlsson; Desmond Child; John Shanks; Kara DioGuardi; David Foster; Stephen Ferrera

Professional ratings
Review scores
Source	Rating
Allmusic	link
USA Today	link

Blue Skies is the debut album by American Idol runner-up Diana DeGarmo, released on December 7, 2004, on RCA Records. It debuted at number 52, selling 47,000 copies in its first week and currently 168,000 copies.

== Track listing ==
No.	Title	Writer(s)	Producer(s)	Length
1.	"Cardboard Castles"	Andreas Carlsson, Lisa Greene, Savan Kotecha	Andreas Carlsson (also lead vocal producer), Desmond Child (lead vocal producer)	3:39
2.	"Blue Skies"	John Shanks, Kara DioGuardi	Kara DioGuardi, John Shanks	4:03
3.	"Emotional"	Desmond Child, Carlsson, Chris Braide	Carlsson, Child	3:06
4.	"Then I Woke Up"	Shanks, DioGuardi, Samantha Moore	Shanks	3:50
5.	"All I Never Wanted"	Shanks, Shelly Peiken	Shanks	4:25
6.	"Go on and Cry"	David Foster, Linda Thompson	David Foster	4:26
7.	"The Difference in Me"	Shanks, Moore, DioGuardi	Shanks	4:02
8.	"Till You Want Me"	Shanks, Moore, DiGuardi	Shanks	3:31
9.	"Dreams"	Child, Carlsson, Braide	Carlsson, Child	3:50
10.	"Boy Like You"	Shanks, Moore, DioGuardi	Shanks	2:58
11.	"Dream, Dream, Dream"	Shanks, DioGuardi	Shanks	3:20
12.	"Don't Cry Out Loud"	Peter Allen, Carole Bayer Sager	new production by Stephan Ferrera	3:45

== Song cover versions ==
- "Emotional" was originally recorded by Michelle McManus for her album The Meaning of Love, released earlier in 2004.
- "The Difference in Me" and "Then I Woke Up" were covered by Clique Girlz for their album, Incredible.
- "Dream, Dream, Dream" was covered by Miley Cyrus for the Hannah Montana: The Movie soundtrack.
- "The Difference in Me" and "Boy Like You" were covered in Spanish by Nikki Clan for their debut album, as "Corazón abierto" and "No me digas que no" respectively.

== Personnel ==
- Diana DeGarmo – vocals
- Kalle Engström – keyboards (1, 9), programming (1, 9)
- Carl Falk – keyboards (1, 9), programming (1, 9), guitars (1)
- Jamie Muhoberac – keyboards (2, 4, 5, 7, 8, 10, 11)
- John Shanks – keyboards (2, 4, 5, 7, 8, 10, 11), guitars (2, 4, 5, 7, 8, 10, 11), bass guitar (2, 4, 5, 7, 8, 10, 11)
- Harry Sommerdahl – keyboards (3), programming (3)
- David Foster – keyboards (6), arrangements (6), horn and string arrangements (6)
- Jochem van der Saag – additional keyboards (6), programming (6), sound design (6)
- Neil Drover – additional programming (6)
- Matt Rollings – acoustic piano (9)
- Bill Payne – acoustic piano (12)
- Tim Pierce – guitars (1, 3), electric guitars (9)
- Dan Warner – guitars (3)
- Dean Parks – acoustic guitars (9)
- Dennis Budimir – guitars (12)
- Lee Ritenour – guitars (12)
- Thomas Blindberg – bass guitar (1, 3)
- Paul Bushnell – bass guitar (9)
- David Hungate – bass guitar (12)
- Abe Laboriel Jr. – drums (1, 3)
- Jeff Rothschild – drums (2, 5, 10, 11)
- Kenny Aronoff – drums (4, 7, 8)
- Jim Keltner – drums (12)
- David Campbell – string arrangements (2)
- Suzie Katayama – string contractor (2)
- Charlie Bisharat – concertmaster (2)
- Jerry Hey – horn and string arrangements (6)
- Barry Fasman – original arrangements (12)
- Andreas Carlsson – backing vocals (1, 3), guitars (3)
- Anna Nordell – backing vocals (1, 3)
- Keely Pressly – backing vocals (1, 3)
- Kara DioGuardi – backing vocals (2, 4, 5, 7, 8, 10, 11)

Orchestra on "Dreams"

- David Campbell – horn, string and timpani arrangements and conductor
- Suzie Katayama – string contractor
- Bettie Ross-Blumer – copyist
- Joe Meyer and Brad Warnaar – French horn
- Larry Corbett and Armen Ksajikian – cello
- Robert Becker and Evan Wilson – viola
- Bob Zimmitti – timpani

Choir on "Dreams"

- Andreas Carlsson and Chris Willis – arrangements
- Chris Braide, Andreas Carlsson, Bill Champlin, Desmond Child, Kevin Dorsey, Sheléa Frazier, Jim Gilstrap, Lori Perry, Oren Waters and Chris Willis – singers

== Production ==
- Clive Davis – album producer
- Stephen Ferrera – A&R
- Brian Coleman – production manager (1, 3, 9)
- Shari Sutcliffe – production coordinator and contractor (2, 4, 5, 7, 8, 10, 11)
- Kwaku Altson – photography
- FJH – art direction
- Brenda DeGarmo – management

Technical

- Joe Yannece – mastering at The Hit Factory (New York, NY)
- Andreas Carlsson – recording (1, 3)
- Kalle Engström – recording (1, 9), Pro Tools engineer (9)
- Carl Falk – recording (1, 9), Pro Tools engineer (9)
- Matt Gruber – recording (1, 3, 9)
- Jay Ruston – recording (1)
- Harry Sommerdahl – recording (1, 3)
- Jeff Rothschild – engineer (2, 4, 5, 7, 8, 10, 11), mixing (2)
- Dan Warner – recording (3)
- Humberto Gatica – recording (6), mixing (6)
- Steve Churchyard – string recording (9)
- Bob Clearmountain – recording (9), mixing (9)
- Jules Gondor – recording (9)
- Rob Jacobs – recording (9)
- Andy Zulla – recording (12), mixing (12)
- Serban Ghenea – mixing (1, 3–5, 7, 8, 10, 11)
- John Shanks – mixing (2)
- John Hanes – additional Pro Tools engineer (1, 3–5, 8, 10)
- Tim Roberts – Pro Tools assistant (1, 3–5, 8, 10)
- Neil Devor – digital engineer and editing (6)
- Alejandro Rodriguez – digital engineer and editing (6)
- Jochem van der Saag – digital engineer and editing (6)
- Mike Eleopoulos – second engineer (1, 3), assistant engineer (9)
- Richard Hwang – second engineer (1, 3), recording (9)
- Alex Pavlides – second engineer (1, 3)
- Lars Fox – additional engineer (2, 4, 5, 7, 8, 10, 11)
- Mark Valentine – additional engineer (2, 4, 5, 7, 8, 10, 11)
- Greg Burns – assistant engineer (9)
- Kevin Harp – assistant engineer (9), assistant mix engineer (9)
- Anthony Kilhoffer – assistant engineer (9)
- Curt Kroeger – assistant engineer (9)
