= Samantha Moore =

Canadian singer

Samantha Jo Moore
- Born: December 28, 1988 (age 37)
- Origin: Ontario, Canada
- Years active: 2002-2009
- Label: RomanLine Records

Samantha Jo Moore (born December 28, 1988) is a Canadian former singer and songwriter whose songs have been recorded and re-cut by Miley Cyrus (“East Northumberland High” from Meet Miley Cyrus), as well as up and coming artists, including Diana DeGarmo (“Then I Woke Up”, “The Difference In Me”, “‘Till You Want Me”, “Boy Like You”, from Blue Skies), and The Clique Girlz (“Then I Woke Up”, “The Difference In Me”, from Incredible and the EP Clique Girlz) and co-wrote “Falling Down Your Stare” from Hope 7's self-titled debut album. Additionally, Mexican Pop band, Nikki Clan did a cover of “A Boy Like You” and “The Difference In Me” for their debut album, No Sera Igual.

== Background ==
Moore grew up in Colborne, Ontario, Canada. She attended East Northumberland Secondary School.

She began performing in summer singing competitions around Ontario. and was 'discovered' in 2002 at age thirteen while competing in the Kingston, Ontario Fall Fair Talent Contest. Six months later she was signed to a standard one record deal with Geffen Records and moved to Los Angeles to write and record music.

Samantha collaborated with well-known industry songwriters such as Curt Frasca, Sabelle Breer, Kara DioGuardi, Robbie Nevil, Matthew Wilder and The Matrix team of Lauren Christy, Graham Edwards and Scott Spock. By the age of sixteen, Samantha had written and collaborated on more than fifty songs. Many of these songs were recorded, but the release of her debut album was delayed.

Moore’s songs “I Thought the World Was Round", and “Replace U" produced by Avril Lavigne's producers Curt Frasca and Sabelle Breer were featured on MTV’s television series, “The Hills”, the latter being included in the series soundtrack release. Her song “Pretty” was featured on MTV’s Laguna Beach.

After Geffen continued to push back a release date for Moore's album for various reasons, ultimately not officially releasing any singles of hers either, Moore moved back to Ontario around 2006 or 2007, and returned to education. During this time, Moore continued to release her previously recorded music together with her former collaborators independently, before retiring from the music industry entirely in 2009. Despite this, her contracts with Geffen and UMG would not officially expire until 2011 and 2013 respectively.

Her first album, Both Sides of Me, was released in September 2007 and contained 25 songs, including the original demo that secured her initial record contract, a cover of the Avril Lavigne song "Breakaway", which also proved to be a huge hit for Kelly Clarkson in 2004. The album showcased Moore’s talents as a singer and her abilities with lyrical songwriting, and was a mix of songs dominated by a pop/rock style, along with a few country styled tracks.

Her second album, “Finally” was released in August 2008 and contains a number of the more popular tracks from her first album, along with the previously unreleased song “They’re There”.

She signed a million dollar music publishing deal with BMG Music Publishing and had formed her own publishing company, "Sammy Jo Productions Inc."

Moore currently works in the real estate industry, and has since 2012.

== Discography ==
2007: "Both Sides of Me" (which regroups the two next albums, a live version of Here's To U and Then I Woke Up) Released by RomanLine Records
2008: "Finally" Released by RomanLine Records
2009: "Prequel To Finally : Country Based Songs"
