= Ariel Moore =

Ariel Moore may refer to:

- Ariel Moore, member of the American girl group Clique Girlz
- Ariel Moore, character of the American musical Footloose
