= Hope 7 (album) =

Studio album by Hope 7
- Released: March 15, 2005
- Recorded: 2003–2005
- Genre: Pop rock; power pop; pop punk
- Length: 35:06
- Label: Armato Records, Trauma
- Producer: Antonina Armato/Tim James

Singles from Hope 7
- 1. "Breakthrough" Released: September 28, 2004; 2. "One Thing"

Hope 7 is the self-titled debut album from the pop rock band Hope 7. The album was released on March 15, 2005, and is the band's only album release to date. The tracks on this album were mainly written by Antonina Armato and Tim James (with the exception of tracks 3, which was written by Aaron Dudley and track 7 (which was written by Kristi McClave (the band's lead vocalist) and Dave Noble (Hope 7's guitarist). McClave also collaborated on the writing of track 8.

The album spawned one single, Breakthrough, which appeared on the Disney Channel.

== Track listing ==
1. "Top Of The World" (Antonina Armato/Tim James/Rob Giles) 2:30
2. "Breakthrough" (Antonina Armato/Tim James) 2:44
3. "Stupid People" (Aaron Dudley) 3:09
4. "Fly" (Antonina Armato/Tim James) 3:07
5. "One Thing" (Antonina Armato/Tim James/Greenhouse) 3:03
6. "He's Enough Reason" (Antonina Armato/Tim James) 3:29
7. "Better Off" (Kristi McClave/Dave Noble) 2:45
8. "Falling Down Your Stare" (Antonina Armato/Tim James/Kristi McClave/Samantha Moore) 4:03
9. "I Want Everything" (Antonina Armato/Tim James) 2:56
10. "Feels So Good" (Antonina Armato/Tim James/Rob Giles) 4:28
11. "Who We Are" (Antonina Armato/Tim James/Greenhouse/Ray Cham) 2:58

== Full list of personnel ==
- Vocals - Kristi McClave
- Guitars - Dave Noble
- Bass - Chevy Martinez
- Drums - Chase Duddy
- Producers - Antonina Armato/Tim James
- Mixed by - Tim James
- Recorded at - Rock Mafia Studios, Santa Monica
- Mastered by - Stephen Marsh @ Threshold Mastering
- Additional musicians - Tim Pierce, Dorion Crozier, Guy, Emerson, Nigel Lundemo
- Falling Down Your Stare strings arranged by - Stevie Blacke
- Top Of The World drum programming - Nigel Lundemo
- Photography - Deborah Wald
- Album Coordinator - Angela P. Bures
- Art Direction - Deborah Razo, Razdezignz
- Managed by - PC Alliance

== Reception ==
- Allmusic link
