= True Love (Destinee & Paris song) =

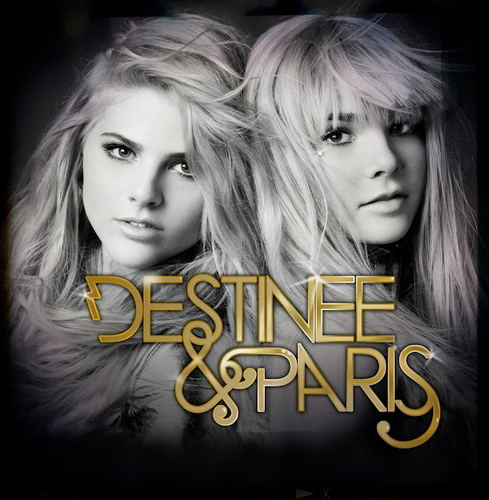

Single by Destinee & Paris
- Released: August 9, 2011
- Genre: Dance-pop
- Length: 3:31
- Label: Interscope
- Songwriter(s): Carl Falk; Lazonate Franklin; Rami Yacoub
- Producer(s): Carl Falk; Rami Yacoub; Steve Angello

"True Love" is the debut single released by American pop music duo Destinee & Paris, released on August 9, 2011, as the intended lead single from their unreleased debut studio album, Heart of Mine. The song was written by Carl Falk, Lazonate Franklin, and Rami Yacoub, while Falk and Yacoub handled production alongside Steve Angello of Swedish House Mafia.

== Background ==
Destinee & Paris formed as a musical group in 2009, following time as members of teen pop group Clique Girlz. After the Clique Girlz split up, the duo began work on their debut album, Heart of Mine with producer RedOne. To promote the upcoming project, the duo additionally embarked on Britney Spears' Femme Fatale Tour as opening acts for the North American leg.

== Composition ==
"True Love" is a dance-pop song with a length of three minutes and thirty one seconds. It is in the key of F♯ minor, and moves at a tempo of 120 beats per minute. The song's instrumentation consists of ambient synths and contains an explosive chorus. The song was compared to "Teenage Dream" by Katy Perry.

== Music video ==
The music video for "True Love," directed by Steven Antin, was released in 2011. The music video opens with a beach scene, before cutting to the duo singing and performing choreography to the song, while containing love interests for the duo at a party. The video has been described as "nautical".

== Track listing ==
Digital download

1. "True Love" - 3:32

== Release history ==
Region	Release date	Format	Ref
Various	August 9, 2011	Digital download	
