= Long Way from Home (album) =

Long Way From Home

Studio album by Peter Cincotti
- Released: 13 October 2017
- Genre: Pop, Jazz

Peter Cincotti chronology
Metropolis (2012)	Long Way From Home (2017)

Long Way From Home is an album by Peter Cincotti, released in 2017. It is Cincotti's fifth album.

== Track listing ==
No.	Title	Length
1.	"Long Way from Home"	4:17
2.	"Sexy"	3:30
3.	"Made for Me"	4:02
4.	"Story for Another Day"	4:05
5.	"Palermo"	3:26
6.	"Too Soon"	3:45
7.	"Roman Skies"	4:19
8.	"Half of You"	4:51
9.	"What's Sara Doing?"	3:35
10.	"Wanna Be"	4:06
11.	"Hangover City"	3:19
12.	"Sounds of Summer"	4:32
