= Despicable Me (soundtrack) =

2010 soundtrack album

Despicable Me: Original Motion Picture Soundtrack

Soundtrack album by Pharrell Williams and various artists
- Released: July 6, 2010
- Recorded: September 2008–January 2010
- Studios: The Record Plant in Los Angeles, CA
- Genres: Pop; pop rock; dance-pop; teen pop; R&B; hip hop; disco; funk; soul
- Length: 35:09
- Labels: Star Trak; Interscope
- Producers: Hans Zimmer; Pharrell Williams; Heitor Pereira

Despicable Me: Original Motion Picture Soundtrack is the soundtrack to the film of the same name, and it was released on July 6, 2010. It features new songs from the film written, performed, produced and/or composed by Pharrell Williams, and performances by Destinee & Paris, The Sylvers, Robin Thicke, The Bee Gees, and David Bisbal. A soundtrack album including the many other songs that appear in the film has been unofficially unreleased.

The film's score was composed by Pharrell Williams & Heitor Pereira and produced by Hans Zimmer. It was recorded with a 67-piece ensemble of the Hollywood Studio Symphony at the Newman Scoring Stage at 20th Century Fox. As of December 30, 2010, the film's score had not been officially released; however, 8 tracks appeared on MagicBoxMusic.com in November 2010.

Two of the songs that appeared in the film, "Despicable Me" and "Prettiest Girls", appeared on the Best Original Song shortlist for the 83rd Academy Awards.

Rip Slyme provides the theme song for the Japanese release for the first film "Good Times (Bad Times remix)".

== Despicable Me: Original Motion Picture Soundtrack ==
All music is composed by Pharrell Williams, except as noted.

No.	Title	Writer(s)	Performer	Length
1.	"Despicable Me"		Pharrell Williams	4:13
2.	"Fun, Fun, Fun"		Pharrell Williams	3:26
3.	"I'm On a Roll"		Destinee & Paris	3:11
4.	"Minion Mambo"	Pharrell Williams, Lupe Fiasco	The Minions featuring Pharrell Williams and Lupe Fiasco	3:04
5.	"Boogie Fever"	Freddie Perren, Kenneth St. Lewis	The Sylvers	3:28
6.	"My Life"	Pharrell Williams, Robin Thicke	Robin Thicke	3:54
7.	"Prettiest Girls"		Pharrell Williams	3:19
8.	"Rocket's Theme"		Pharrell Williams	4:03
9.	"You Should Be Dancing"	Barry Gibb, Robin Gibb, Maurice Gibb	Bee Gees	4:18
10.	"The Unicorn Song"		Agnes (Elsie Fisher)	2:08
11.	"Soñar (My Life)"	Pharrell Williams, Robin Thicke	David Bisbal	4:03

== Despicable Me: Original Motion Picture Soundtrack (More Music) ==
All music is composed by Pharrell Williams, except as noted.

No.	Title	Writer(s)	Performer	Length
1.	"Despicable Me (Orchestra Version)"		Pharrell	1:46
2.	"Casino Royale"	Burt Bacharach, Hal David	Herb Alpert & The Tijuana Brass	2:36
3.	"Prettiest Girls (Introduction)"		Pharrell	0:42
4.	"Prettiest Girls (Orchestra Version)"		Pharrell	2:22
5.	"Sweet Home Alabama"	Ed King, Gary Rossington, Ronnie Van Zant	Lynyrd Skynyrd	4:45
6.	"Despicable Me II (Checking Inn)"		Pharrell	1:48
7.	"Garota de Ipanema"	Antônio Carlos Jobim	Antonio Jobim & Vinicius De Moraes	0:42
8.	"The Way It Is (Vector's Theme)"	Pharrell Williams, D.A. Wallach	D.A. Wallach	0:48
9.	"Copacabana"	Jack Feldman, Barry Manilow, Bruce Sussman	Barry Manilow	5:46
10.	"Fun, Fun, Fun (Orchestra Version)"		Pharrell	2:52
11.	"Swan Lake Waltz"	Pyotr Ilyich Tchaikovsky	Pyotr Ilyich Tchaikovsky	6:49

== Despicable Me Score ==
All music is composed by Heitor Pereira and Pharrell Williams.

No.	Title	Length
1.	"Happy Gru"	0:52
2.	"Door Bell Rings"	0:22
3.	"Kyle Attacks"	0:30
4.	"Nefario Calls Gru"	1:08
5.	"Minion March"	1:29
6.	"Miss Hattie's Face"	0:49
7.	"Gru Calls Mom"	0:43
8.	"Meeting Mr. Perkins"	1:10
9.	"Explosion"	0:19
10.	"Meet The Girls (Reprise)"	0:27
11.	"Adoption Process"	4:02
12.	"Gru's Lair"	1:01
13.	"Gru's Kitchen"	1:41
14.	"All Girls Amped Up"	0:18
15.	"Girls To Bed"	1:58
16.	"Girls To Dance Class"	0:34
17.	"Gru Is Angry"	1:04
18.	"Nefario Is Angry"	0:27
19.	"Teleconference"	3:37
20.	"Piggy Bank"	2:18
21.	"Hyper Girls"	0:37
22.	"Sleepy Kittens"	3:38
23.	"Nefario Confronts Gru"	1:43
24.	"Don't Let Her Take Us"	1:34
25.	"Kisses Goodnight"	2:41

== Despicable Me Score (Promo) ==
All music is composed by Heitor Pereira and Pharrell Williams.

No.	Title	Length
1.	"Logo – Beautiful Egypt"	1:42
2.	"Mal Mart"	1:36
3.	"Cookie Delivery"	3:30
4.	"Drunk Unicorn"	0:36
5.	"Blast Off"	1:32
6.	"Gru In Space"	0:47
7.	"Rushing Back"	1:34
8.	"Gru VS. Vector"	6:03

== Despicable Me Score (EP) ==
All music is composed by Heitor Pereira and Pharrell Williams.

No.	Title	Length
1.	"Happy Gru"	0:42
2.	"Minions March"	1:22
3.	"Gru's Lair"	0:59
4.	"Gru's Kitchen"	1:39
5.	"Piggy Bank"	2:16
6.	"Korean Lab Heist"	3:39
7.	"The Moon"	1:31
