= On the Moon =

Studio album by Peter Cincotti
- Released: September 14, 2004
- Recorded: 2004
- Genre: Jazz
- Length: 47:46
- Label: Concord
- Producer: Phil Ramone

Peter Cincotti chronology
Peter Cincotti (2003)	On the Moon (2004)	East of Angel Town (2007)

Professional ratings
Review scores
Source	Rating
Allmusic	4/5 stars

On the Moon is a 2004 album by jazz pianist, singer, and composer Peter Cincotti. It was released on the Concord label and produced by Phil Ramone.

== Track listing ==
1. "St. Louis Blues" (W. C. Handy) – 4:13
2. "Some Kind of Wonderful" (Gerry Goffin, Carole King) – 3:30
3. "I Love Paris" (Cole Porter) – 3:44
4. "On the Moon" (Peter Cincotti) – 5:02
5. "Bali Ha'i" (Richard Rodgers, Oscar Hammerstein II) – 3:57
6. "He's Watching" (Peter Cincotti) – 4:45
7. "Raise the Roof" (Andrew Lippa) – 4:08
8. "The Girl for Me Tonight" (Peter Cincotti, Pia Cincotti) – 5:00
9. "You Don't Know Me" (Eddy Arnold, Cindy Walker) – 4:34
10. "I'd Rather Be with You" (Peter Cincotti) – 4:48
11. "Up on the Roof" (Gerry Goffin, Carole King) – 2:52
12. "Cherokee" (Ray Noble) – 3:13

== Personnel ==
- Peter Cincotti (piano, vocal)
- Barak Mori (bass)
- Mark McLean (drums)
- Kenny Washington (drums)
- Jeffrey Mironov (guitar)
- Scott Kreitzer (tenor sax)
- Sam Yahel (keyboard)
- Wycliffe Gordon (trombone)
- Bashiri Johnson (percussion)
- William Galison (harmonica)
- Brad Leali (alto sax)
- Gary Smulyan (baritone sax)
- Barry Danelian (trumpet)

=== Concert Master ===
- Elena Barere

== Charts ==
Country	Position
France	21
Italy	35
