= East Northumberland Secondary School =

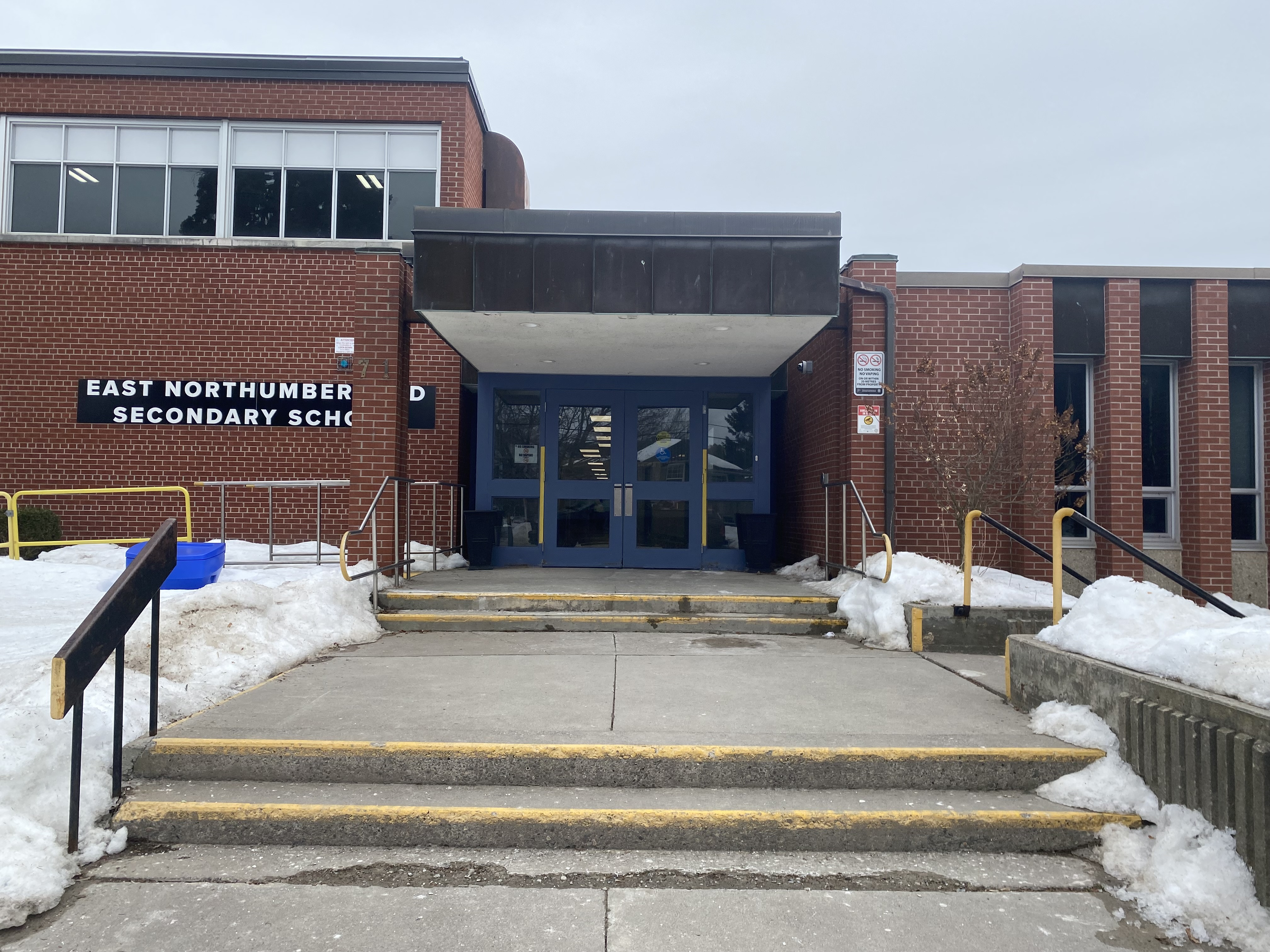

Location
- 71 Dundas Street; Brighton, Ontario, K0K 1H0; Canada; 44.045°N 77.731°W

Information
- Other name: ENSS
- Motto: In Sinc, Vigno, Emus (Tradition, Excellence, Heart)
- Founded: 1950
- School board: Kawartha Pine Ridge District School Board
- Principal: Jamie Patenall
- Vice-Principal: Jadine Reynolds
- Vice-Principal: Jackie Waller
- Grades: 9 to 12
- Enrolment: 950 (2018)
- Colours: Blue and Gold
- Mascot: The Blue Dragon
- Team name: Blue Dragons
- Website: eastnorthumberland.kprdsb.ca

East Northumberland Secondary School (ENSS) is a secondary school in Brighton, Ontario, Canada.

The school was the topic of a song performed by Miley Cyrus called "East Northumberland High", written by ENSS alum Samantha Moore.

== Sports ==
The school offers the following sports; Curling, Soccer, Basketball, Volleyball, Badminton, Rugby, Cross Country, and Track and Field. As of 2024, ENSS has captured the Bay of Quinte Track & Field title 38 consecutive times.

== Musicals ==
East Northumberland Secondary School is regarded as having an esteemed theatre program. The show Matilda was performed in 2023.

== Reputation as a "Green" School ==
Over the years, ENSS has been known as a "Green" school, with regular garbage clean-ups, tree-plantings, and a heavily involved Environmental Club. The environmental club runs the "Chique Boutique", an in-school thrift store.

ENSS installed a wind turbine in June 2009, generating power and reducing ENSS's carbon footprint. In the summer of 2011, ENSS installed solar panels on the roof of the school.

== Terry Fox Fundraising ==
ENSS runs a variety of different fundraisers for the Terry Fox Foundation, including the Terry Fox Run, a pancake breakfast, a dance, and the Hope Project. Two students started the Hope Project in 2018. Community members are invited to purchase bricks for the ENSS Garden of Hope, with a portion of each donation going to the Terry Fox Foundation. In 2015, the school reached the milestone "One Million for Terry", after raising over one million dollars throughout their years of fundraising.

== See also ==
- Education in Ontario
- List of secondary schools in Ontario
