= Metropolis (Peter Cincotti album) =

Studio album by Peter Cincotti
- Released: 2012
- Length: 44:16
- Label: Heads Up
- Producer: John Fields

Peter Cincotti chronology
| East of Angel Town (2007) | Metropolis (2012) | Long Way from Home (2017) |

Metropolis is an album by Peter Cincotti, released in May 2012. It is Cincotti's fourth album.

== Track list ==
All tracks are written by Peter Cincotti, except where noted.

| No. | Title | Writer(s) | Length |
|---|---|---|---|
| 1. | "Metropolis" | | 4:25 |
| 2. | "My Religion" | Cincotti, Jon Ingoldsby | 3:48 |
| 3. | "Do or Die" | Cincotti, David Ryan Harris | 3:48 |
| 4. | "Take a Good Look" | Cincotti, John Bettis | 4:16 |
| 5. | "Nothing's Enough" | | 3:44 |
| 6. | "Magnetic" | | 4:07 |
| 7. | "Graffiti Wall" | Cincotti, Bettis, Michael Davey | 3:40 |
| 8. | "Fit You Better" | Cincotti, Harris | 3:21 |
| 9. | "Madeline" | | 4:01 |
| 10. | "World Gone Crazy" | Cincotti, Ingoldsby | 3:23 |
| 11. | "Forever and Always" | | 4:12 |
| 12. | "Before I Go" | | 3:35 |
