= Peter Cincotti (album) =

Studio album by Peter Cincotti
- Released: March 11, 2003
- Recorded: 2003
- Genre: Jazz
- Length: 44:26
- Label: Concord
- Producer: Phil Ramone

Peter Cincotti chronology
Peter Cincotti (2003)	On the Moon (2004)

Professional ratings
Review scores
Source	Rating
Allmusic	3/5 stars

Peter Cincotti is the first studio album by jazz pianist, singer and composer Peter Cincotti, released on the Concord label, produced by Phil Ramone.

== Track listing ==
No.	Title	Length
1.	"I Changed the Rules"	5:14
2.	"Comes Love"	4:18
3.	"Are You the One?"	3:55
4.	"Sway"	4:12
5.	"Miss Brown"	4:17
6.	"Lovers, Secrets, Lies"	3:46
7.	"The Fool on the Hill/Nature Boy"	3:37
8.	"Ain't Misbehavin'"	3:43
9.	"Come Live Your Life With Me (The Godfather Waltz)"	4:46
10.	"Spinning Wheel"	3:10
11.	"You Stepped Out of a Dream"	3:18
12.	"Rainbow Connection"	4:01

== Chart performance ==
Chart	Peak position
Italy	75
US Billboard 200	118
