= Move On (David Jordan song) =

Single by David Jordan

from the album Set the Mood
- Released: 4 May 2008 (Download); 12 May 2008 (CD single)
- Genre: Dance music
- Length: 4:00
- Label: ZTT / Mercury
- Songwriter(s): David Jordan, John Holliday
- Producer(s): Trevor Horn

David Jordan singles chronology
"Sun Goes Down" (2008)	"Move On" (2008)	"One Nation" (2011)

"Move On" is the second chart single from David Jordan, taken from his first album Set the Mood. "Move On" peaked at number 68 on the UK Singles Chart.

== Critical reception ==
Alex Fletcher of Digital Spy Chart Blog gave the song a positive review stating:

With a dash of Terence Trent D'Arby, a fair dollop of Justin Timberlake and a sprinkling of Prince, David Jordan looks to have stumbled upon a recipe for chart success. His first release 'Place In My Heart' got critics' tongues wagging, while his last single 'Sun Goes Down' had plenty of fans splashing their pocket money, bagging the Barnet-born warbler a number four chart spot. With his debut album Set The Mood wriggling up the top 40, it's perfect timing for release number three.

His latest titbit, 'Move On', follows a similar formula to his last two releases, focusing on Jordan's ability to switch between piercing falsetto and husky warbling at the drop of a beat. It ticks all the right boxes, with a crunching rhythm, plenty of zoom sound effects and a superb vocal performance from the 23-year-old. Unfortunately, it does little else beyond that and occasionally slips into boyband parody with ultra-emotional crooning and tacky breakdowns that were probably last heard on a 5ive record. Fortunately, behind all that, Jordan's obvious talents shine through, meaning his march towards pop stardom should continue uninterrupted..

== Track listings ==
Album version
No.	Title	Length
1.	"Move On"	4:18

iTunes - EP
No.	Title	Length
1.	"Move On" (Wideboys Electro Club Mix)	5:17
2.	"Move On" (Wideboys Electro Dub)	4:58
3.	"Move On" (Wideboys Bassline Mix)	4:47

== Chart performance ==
Chart	Peak Position
UK Singles (OCC)	68
