= Nature of the Beast (album) =

Studio album by Maureen Steele
- Released: April 1985
- Genre: Pop; dance-pop; post-disco
- Length: 38:53
- Label: Motown
- Producer: Steve Barri; Bobby Sandstrom

Singles from Nature of the Beast
- 1. "Boys Will Be Boys" Released: 1985; 2. "Save the Night for Me" Released: 1985

Nature of the Beast is the debut and sole studio album by American pop singer Maureen Steele, released in April 1985 by Motown. It was produced by Steve Barri and Steele's brother Bobby Sandstrom, the former of whom was the vice-president of A&R at Motown at that time, and oversaw big-selling releases by Lionel Richie and Rick James, among others. It is also notably one of the few albums by a white artist to have been released by the label at that time.

The album peaked at No. 210 on the Billboard Bubbling Under the Top Pop Albums chart. Two singles were released from the album that also charted, with "Boys Will Be Boys" peaking at No. 18 on Billboard's Hot Dance Music/Club Play chart, and "Save the Night for Me" peaking at No. 77 on the Billboard Hot 100 chart.

== Critical reception ==
Professional ratings
Review scores
Source	Rating
AllMusic	2/5 stars
The Michigan Daily	(negative)
The Evening Post	3/10 stars

In a contemporary review for The Michigan Daily, critic John Logie described the album as "ridiculously derivative, with Steele sounding like virtually every singer to crack the Top 10 in the past three years. Teena Marie, DeBarge, Madonna, Pat Benatar, Survivor, and Sheena Easton are all aped in rapid succession, making this record forgettable unless you consider Steele's chameleon-like ability to sound like a generic Top-40 radio station artistry." In a 1986 review for The Evening Post, critic Gary Steel wrote that "Steele (or should I say her marketing director?) seems to be aiming for a dilution of early Prince in feminine attire. The music is dowdy disco with metal guitar breaks and the songs range from dirty girl sex – ‘Bad Girls Do It Better’ – to pop pastiche stereotype reafirmations like ‘Save the Night for Me’. Tired."

In a retrospective review for AllMusic, critic Justin Kantor wrote that "Steele possesses a solid pop/rock bounce, and the lyrical content of Nature of the Beast certainly isn't limited to the usual formulas employed in the genre. But Steve Barri and Bobby Sandstrom's unimaginative production and melodies largely prevent the set from making any statement."

== Track listing ==
All tracks are written by Bobby Sandstrom and Michael Price, except where noted

Side one
No.	Title	Writer(s)	Length
1.	"Nature of the Beast"	Bobby Sandstrom; Michael Price; Steve Barri	4:21
2.	"Physical Therapy"		3:59
3.	"Save the Night for Me"	Sandstrom; Price; Maureen Steele	3:34
4.	"Sneak Preview"		3:42
5.	"Rock My Heart"		4:18

Side two
No.	Title	Writer(s)	Length
6.	"Bad Girls Do It Better"		3:51
7.	"Sidetracked"		4:01
8.	"Do You Like It When I Hurt You"		3:56
9.	"My Shy Lover"	Bob Mitchell; Jamie Kaleth	3:12
10.	"Boys Will Be Boys"		3:59
Total length:			38:53

== Personnel ==
Credits are adapted from the Nature of the Beast liner notes.

Musicians

- Maureen Steele – vocals
- Bobby Sandstrom – all keyboards; synthesizers; drum machine programming; backing vocals
- Michael Sandstrom – Simmons drums
- Jeff Steele – bass; additional backing vocals on "My Shy Lover"
- Michael Landau – rhythm; lead guitar
- Paul Jackson Jr. – rhythm guitar on "Sneak Preview", and "Bad Girls Do It Better"
- Tim Pierce – guitar on "Save the Night for Me"
- Don Markese – saxophone on "Physical Therapy"
- Dan Walsh – additional backing vocals on "My Shy Lover"

Production and artwork

- Bobby Sandstrom – producer; arrangement
- Steve Barri – producer
- Roger Nichols – associate producer; engineer
- Tony Peluso – engineer; mixing
- Joe Arlotta – engineer
- Johnny Lee – art direction
- Janet Levinson – design
- Raul Vega – photography

== Charts ==
Album – Billboard (North America)

Year	Chart	Position
1985	Billboard Bubbling Under the Top Pop Albums	210
