= Sun Goes Down (David Jordan song) =

2008 single by David Jordan

Single by David Jordan

from the album Set the Mood
- B-side: "Finest of Ways"
- Released: 4 February 2008
- Studio: Compass Point (Nassau, Bahamas)
- Length: 3:18
- Label: ZTT; Mercury
- Songwriters: David Jordan; Simon Pilton
- Producer: Steve Lipson

David Jordan singles chronology
"Place in My Heart" (2007)	"Sun Goes Down" (2008)	"Move On" (2008)

"Sun Goes Down" is a song by English singer-songwriter David Jordan, taken from his first album, Set the Mood (2007). "Sun Goes Down" was A-listed by BBC Radio 1 and entered the UK Singles Chart on downloads alone on 13 January 2008 at number 84. Following its physical release on 4 February 2008, it rose to number four on 17 February. Jordan first performed the song live at the Royal Variety Performance in December 2007.

== Critical reception ==
Nick Levine of Digital Spy gave the song a positive review stating:

David Jordan's debut single, 'Place In My Heart', might not have been a hit, but the Barnet boy still has the whiff of a superstar about him. Did you catch his set at The Royal Variety Performance last month? Those lithe, swivelling hips put Mick Jagger to shame.

If 'Sun Goes Down' doesn't propel the Trevor Horn protégé towards the top of the charts, it's likely that nothing will. A mixture of Celtic fiddles, stomping, glammy beats and a chorus that could quite easily have been nicked from a Victorian playground chant, it sounds like nothing else around at the moment, while also sounding like something you've had in your CD collection for decades. Pretty nifty, eh?.

== Track listings ==
UK CD single 1
No.	Title	Length
1.	"Sun Goes Down"
2.	"Finest of Ways"

UK CD single 2
No.	Title	Length
1.	"Sun Goes Down"
2.	"Finest of Ways"
3.	"Sun Goes Down" (Delinquent remix)

Digital download
No.	Title	Length
1.	"Sun Goes Down"	3:18
2.	"Sun Goes Down" (Delinquent remix)	4:45

== Charts ==
=== Weekly charts ===
Chart (2008–2009)	Peak position
Europe (Eurochart Hot 100)	15
Hungary (Rádiós Top 40)	11
Ireland (IRMA)	20
Italy (FIMI)	34
Scottish Singles Sales (Official Charts)	3
Switzerland (Schweizer Hitparade)	42
UK Singles (Official Charts)	4

=== Year-end charts ===
Chart (2008)	Position
Hungary (Rádiós Top 40)	27
UK Singles (OCC)	62

Chart (2009)	Position
Hungary (Rádiós Top 40)	97

== Certifications ==
Region	Certification	Certified units/sales
United Kingdom (BPI)	Silver	200,000^{‡}
^{‡} Sales+streaming figures based on certification alone.
