= The Right Kinda Lover =

1994 single by Patti LaBelle

Single by Patti LaBelle

from the album Gems
- Released: May 10, 1994
- Genre: Funk; soul
- Length: 4:52
- Label: MCA
- Songwriters: Ann Bennett-Nesby; Terry Lewis; James Harris III; Jimmy Wright
- Producers: Jimmy Jam and Terry Lewis; Wright

Patti LaBelle singles chronology
"All Right Now" (1993)	"The Right Kinda Lover" (1994)	"All This Love" (1994)

Music video
- "The Right Kinda Lover" on YouTube

"The Right Kinda Lover" is a song by American singer and actress Patti LaBelle. It was written by Ann Bennett-Nesby, James Harris III, Terry Lewis, and James "Big Jim" Wright, while production was helmed by Jimmy Jam and Terry Lewis, with Wright as co-producing. The song was released by MCA Records as the first single from her LaBelle's 12th album, Gems (1994), and appeared on the soundtrack to the 1994 film Beverly Hills Cop III, starring Eddie Murphy.

In the United States, "The Right Kinda Lover" reached number 61 on the Billboard Hot 100 and number eight on the Hot R&B/Hip-Hop Songs. It also became LaBelle's second number one on the Dance Club Songs. Overseas, the single also reached number fifty on the UK Singles Chart. The song's video featured LaBelle performing as a seductress choosing her choice of mate.

== Critical reception ==
Larry Flick from Billboard magazine wrote, "At age 50, the divine Ms. LaBelle puts out more verve and energy than a lot of performers half her age. The juicy funk throwdown is featured on her new album, Gems, as well as the soundtrack to Beverly Hills Cop III, and is ripe for picking by R&B, pop, and club programmers. Producers Jam and Lewis surround LaBelle's distinctive voice with phat, rugged grooves and a lively, synth-activated melody. Fab single's bright future is sealed with an array of remixes that range from street hip hop to hearty house."

Troy J. Augusto from Cash Box described it as "a funkified, boisterous cut that will no doubt find the lady back at the top of many formats' charts. Contemporary without sounding forced, courtesy of golden egg production team [...], and sophisticated without sounding stuffy, it's a song that promises to provide many happy summertime memories." Bill Speed and John Martinucci from the Gavin Report declared it "a midtempoed groove that gets your body shaking while singing the praises of finding Mr. Right." Andy Beevers from Music Week gave the song a score of four out of five, adding that the remixes "work very well and will help soul stalwart Labelle reach some new audiences."

== Credits and personnel ==
Credits adapted from the liner notes of Gems.

- Ann Bennett-Nesby – writer
- James Harris III – producer, writer
- Patti LaBelle – executive producer
- Terry Lewis – producer, writer
- Jimmy Wright – co-producer, writer

== Charts ==
=== Weekly charts ===
Weekly chart performance for "The Right Kinda Lover"
Chart (1994)	Peak position
UK Singles (Official Charts)	50
UK Dance (Official Charts)	19
UK Airplay (Music Week)	40
UK Dance (Music Week)	19
UK Club Chart (Music Week)	12
US Billboard Hot 100	61
US Dance Club Songs (Billboard)	1
US Hot R&B/Hip-Hop Songs (Billboard)	8
US Maxi-Singles Sales (Billboard)	13

=== Year-end charts ===
Year-end chart performance for "The Right Kinda Lover"
Chart (1994)	Position
US Hot Dance Music Club/Play (Billboard)	14
US Hot R&B/Hip-Hop Songs (Billboard)	21
US Urban Singles (Cash Box)	15

== Release history ==
Release dates and formats for "The Right Kinda Lover"
Region	Date	Format(s)	Label(s)	Ref.
United States	May 10, 1994	7-inch vinyl; 12-inch vinyl; cassette	MCA	
United Kingdom	August 23, 1994	12-inch vinyl; CD; cassette	MCA	
