= Destinee & Paris =

American pop music duo

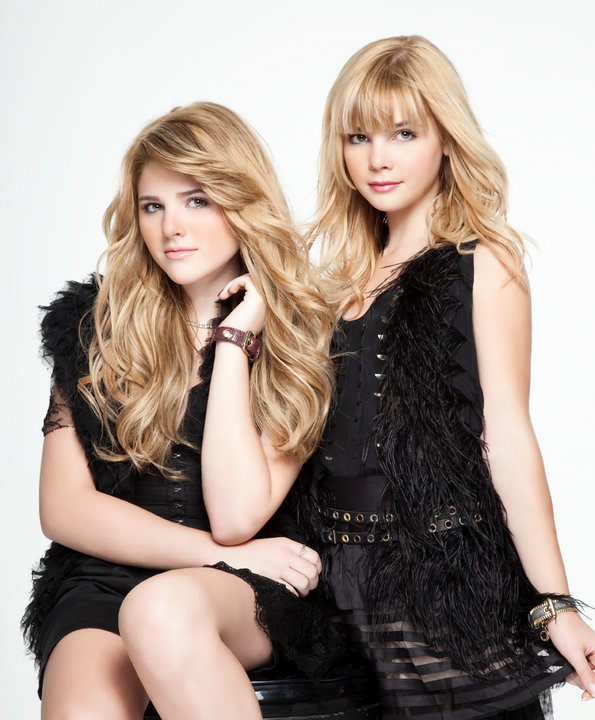
- Destinee (left) and Paris (right)

Background information
- Origin: Egg Harbor Township, New Jersey, U.S.
- Genre: Pop
- Years active: 2009–2012
- Labels: Interscope, Universal Music Group
- Spinoff of: Clique Girlz
- Past members: Destinee Monroe; Paris Monroe
- Website: www.destineeandparis.com

Destinee & Paris were an American pop music duo composed of singer-songwriter sisters Destinee and Paris Monroe, who are former members of the teen pop girl group Clique Girlz. They formed the group in 2009 and were signed to Interscope Records. Born and raised in Egg Harbor Township, New Jersey, now Los Angeles–based, the sisters cite their influences as Britney Spears, Michael Jackson, Christina Aguilera, Beyoncé, Katy Perry, Rihanna, and Gwen Stefani.

== Members ==
=== Destinee Monroe ===
Destinee Raé Monroe (born June 16, 1994) was referred to as the "rock girl" of the duo. Her icon was a star as when she was little she had something in her eye and her mom said it was a star. Her signature color was blue. She's the older sister. Destinee's hobbies include singing and playing guitar, violin and piano.

=== Paris Monroe ===
Paris Quinn Monroe (born January 9, 1996) was referred to as the "princess" of the duo, and her icon was a crown, which she said she loved as a fashion statement. Her signature color was pink. She's the younger sister. She also plays the piano.

== Career ==
Destinee & Paris were the backing vocalists for Season 10 of American Idol in 2011 and appeared on the Disney Channel's So Random in 2012. They were an opening act for the later U.S. dates and the entire European leg of Britney Spears' Femme Fatale Tour in 2011.

Destinee & Paris performed on American Idol-winner Scotty McCreery's first single "I Love You This Big" and contributed the song "I'm on a Roll" to the soundtrack of Despicable Me. Interscope released their first single, "True Love", in August 2011. The music video for "True Love" was directed by Steven Antin and has 2,025,202 views as of October 12, 2021. At the time they were said to be working on their first album, Heart of Mine, with producer RedOne, but there appears to have been no further developments in their career since 2012.

== Discography ==
=== Singles ===
==== As lead artist ====
| Title | Year | Album |
|---|---|---|
| "True Love" | 2011 | Heart of Mine |

=== Other appearances ===
| Title | Year | Album |
|---|---|---|
| "I'm On a Roll" | 2010 | Despicable Me: Original Motion Picture Soundtrack |
