= Peter Cincotti =

American singer-songwriter (born 1983)

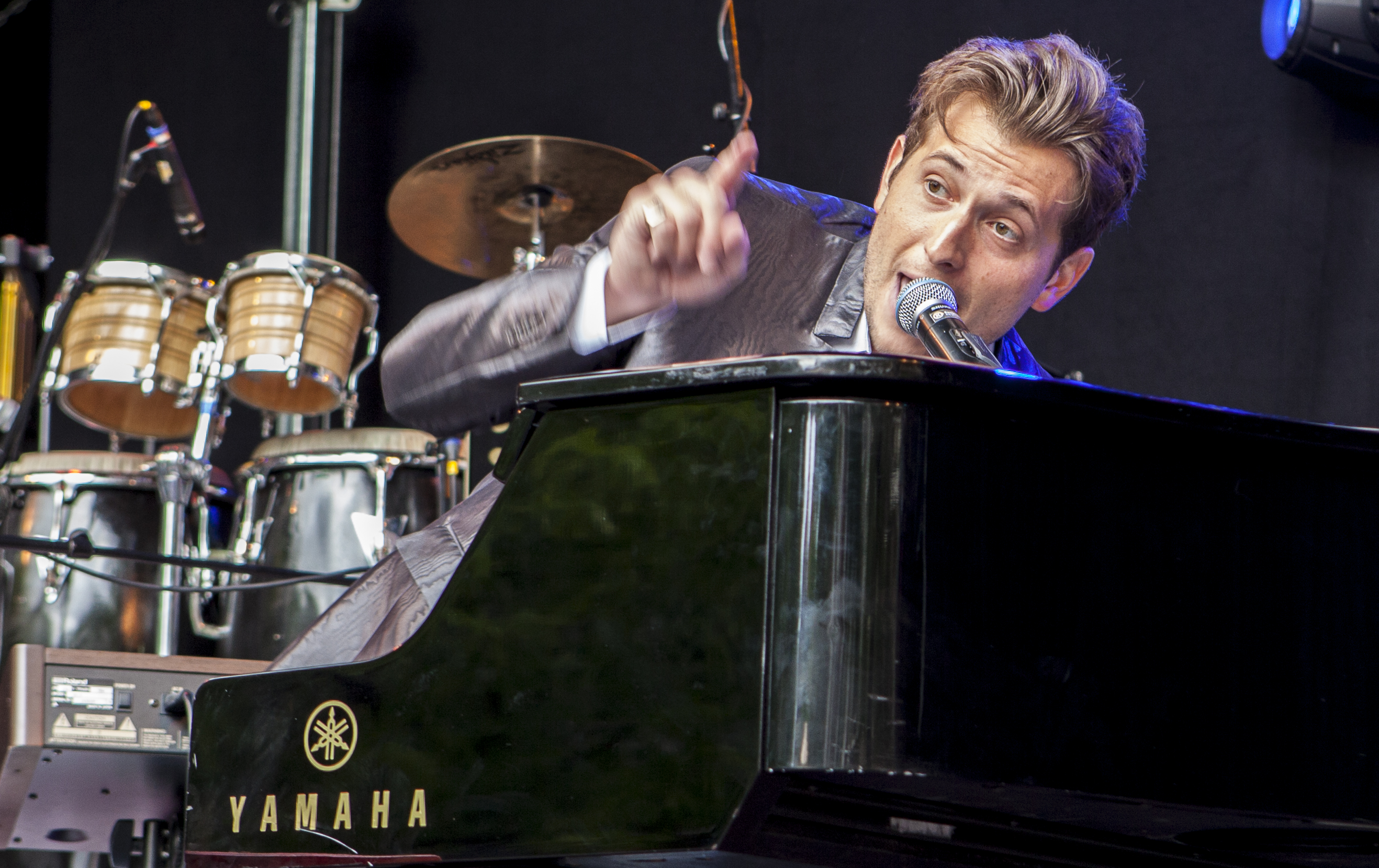

Background information
- Born: July 11, 1983 (age 43); New York City, U.S.
- Genres: Pop, rock, vocal jazz
- Occupation: Singer
- Instruments: Vocals, piano
- Years active: 2000–present
- Labels: Concord, 143 Records
- Website: petercincotti.com

Peter Cincotti (born July 11, 1983) is an American singer-songwriter. He began playing piano at the age of three. While in high school, he regularly performed in clubs throughout Manhattan. In 2003, Cincotti's debut album, produced by Phil Ramone, reached No. 1 on the Billboard jazz chart, making Cincotti the youngest musician to do so. This led to performances at Carnegie Hall, Lincoln Center, Radio City Music Hall, L'Olympia, Queen Elizabeth Hall, and the Montreux Jazz Festival where he won an award in the piano competition. Over the course of seven albums and international collaborations, Cincotti has distinguished himself as one of the most acclaimed singer-songwriters and pianists of his generation, building a sound that moves fluidly between pop, jazz, soul, and contemporary songwriting.

== Life and career ==
Cincotti was born and raised in New York City's Upper East Side. His father is of Italian descent, from Cervinara, a small town in the province of Avellino where he is an honorary citizen. His mother is Jewish. Cincotti started playing a toy piano at the age of three. While in high school, he regularly performed at clubs throughout Manhattan and performed at the White House. He graduated from Columbia University in 2005. At the 2000 Montreux Jazz Festival, he won an award for a rendition of Dizzy Gillespie's A Night in Tunisia.

His 2003 self-titled debut album is a compilation of traditional jazz songs, originals, and covers of classic songs ranging from the Rainbow Connection to Blood, Sweat and Tears's Spinning Wheel. His second album, On the Moon, featured more of the artist's own songs as well and new arrangements of American standards. Combining elements of pop, jazz, funk and, rock, his third studio album, East of Angel Town, features all original works and was released in 2007 in Europe and in January 2009 in the United States. This project began when Cincotti joined record producer David Foster (who signed him to a contract with 143 Records), producer Humberto Gatica, and producer Jochem van der Saag. He toured around the world, promoting the album with his single "Goodbye Philadelphia" and later joined Seal on tour in the U.S. In 2008, he collaborated with French DJ David Guetta and they appeared on the finale of Star Academy, performing Love Is Gone. Combining pop, jazz, rock and dance, Cincotti created his fourth studio album, Metropolis, produced by John Fields and released worldwide in the spring of 2012. In 2016, Cincotti released the EP Exit 105, followed by Long Way from Home on Oct. 13 2017, Cincotti's fifth studio album which he wrote, arranged and produced.

In July 2012, he and his sister Pia Cincotti wrote and produced the musical How Deep Is the Ocean? with music and lyrics by Peter Cincotti and book by Pia Cincotti. It debuted at the New York Musical Theatre Festival. In 2013 he participated in the Festival of Sanremo, singing the song La Felicità (The Happiness) with Simona Molinari. Later that year, Cincotti was named the first male ambassador for Italian luxury designer Tods and collaborated with the brand on the music video "Madeline", which was featured in the Italian edition of Vanity Fair magazine. In 2014 Cincotti wrote, arranged, and produced the soundtrack for the Italian film Le Leggi Del Desiderio (Laws of Desire) directed by Silvio Muccino.

Cincotti appeared in a small role in the 2004 film Beyond the Sea about Bobby Darin and contributed to the film's soundtrack. He had a small role as the piano player in the Hayden Planetarium in Spider-Man 2. His song December Boys is featured in the 2007 film December Boys starring Daniel Radcliffe. He appeared as himself in Season 3 (2015) of the Netflix series House of Cards, singing a duet with President Francis Underwood (played by Kevin Spacey). In April 2015 he performed with Sting and Annie Lennox at The Old Vic Gala.

He is a Dramatists Guild of America musical theater fellow and part of the Johnny Mercer Writing Colony at Goodspeed Musicals.

In 2017, he released the music video for his single, "Made for Me" which was debuted by People Magazine.

During the COVID-19 pandemic, Cincotti wrote and produced a song for New York called ‘Heart Of The City’, which was featured in Katie Couric’s ‘Get Inspired’ newsletter and TV shows such as Good Day New York.

His album Killer On The Keys was released in late 2023 and includes autobiographical originals as well as known songs honoring some of the most influential piano men and women of all time, ranging from Scott Joplin to Lady Gaga.

In December of 2023, Cincotti released an original Christmas song entitled 'Because It's Christmas' which reached #25 on the US AC Top 40 Billboard charts and #3 on the Billboard Independent Artists Chart.

Cincotti has sold out multiple residencies at the Cafe Carlyle in New York, and Town & Country magazine called him 'Already A New York Institution'. His 'Live at Cafe Carlyle' album was released in late 2024.

In May of 2026, Cincotti released the first installment of his latest album of original material In Color: Part One. In Color is an expansive collection of original music unfolding in three parts, featuring a wide range of collaborators—including Angélique Kidjo, Richard Marx, Marcus Miller, Chris Botti, and artists from around the world in multi-language duets. This body of work broadens Cincotti's musical palette while retaining the cinematic storytelling, piano playing, and melodic sensibility that have defined his career.

== Discography ==
- Peter Cincotti (Concord, 2003)
- On the Moon (Concord, 2004)
- East of Angel Town (143 Records/Warner Bros., 2007)
- Metropolis (Heads Up, 2012)
- Long Way from Home (Freddy Eggs, 2017)
- Killer on the Keys (2023)
- In Color: Part One (2026)

== DVD and video ==
- Peter Cincotti: Live in New York (2004)

== Chart history ==
=== Albums ===
List of albums, with selected peak chart positions
Year	Title	US Jazz	US	ITA	SWI	AUT	FRA	BEL (WA)
2003	Peter Cincotti	1	118	75	—	—	—	—
2004	On the Moon	—	128	35	—	—	21	—
2007	East of Angel Town	—	—	30	59	16	26	

=== Singles ===
List of singles, with selected peak chart positions
Year	Title	ITA	SWI	AUT	FRA	BEL (WA)	BEL (FL)	GER
2007	"Goodbye Philadelphia"	28	10	10	21	7	21	67
2011	"In cerca di te"	28	—	—	—	—	—	—
2013	"La felicità"	13	—	—	—	—	—	—
2013	"Dr. Jekyll Mr. Hide"	96	—	—	—	—	—	—
2016	"Le leggi del desiderio"	—	—	—	—	—	—	—
