= Gems (Patti LaBelle album) =

Album by Patti LaBelle

Studio album by Patti LaBelle
- Released: June 7, 1994
- Genre: R&B
- Length: 57:30
- Label: MCA
- Producer: Lisa Dalbello; James "Budd" Ellison; Jimmy Jam & Terry Lewis; Sami McKinney; K.C. Porter; Teddy Riley; Bunny Sigler; Nathaniel "Crockett" Wilkie; James Wright

Patti LaBelle chronology
Live! (1992)	Gems (1994)	Greatest Hits (1996)

Gems is the twelfth studio album by American singer Patti LaBelle. It was released by MCA Records on June 7, 1994, in the United States. The album features a hip-hop-esque remake of DeBarge's 1983 hit, "All This Love", produced by Teddy Riley. Gems peaked at number forty-eight on the US Billboard 200 and went gold with sales shipping past the 500,000 mark. The album is notable for the single "The Right Kinda Lover", which brought LaBelle a new legion of fans thanks to its production by Jimmy Jam and Terry Lewis and its video which had LaBelle performing a seductress who chooses "the right mate" through a machine and if one man rubbed her the wrong way, she'd use a button to get rid of them.

== Critical reception ==
Professional ratings
Review scores
Source	Rating
AllMusic	3/5 stars
Entertainment Weekly	B
Music Week	3/5 stars

AllMusic editor Jose F. Promis found that Gems "doesn't necessarily rank as one of the singer's crowning achievements, but as the title (and cliché) implies, this set certainly offers more than a few gems to unearth.Gems also features a couple of prolific productions courtesy of Jimmy Jam and Terry Lewis (on the set's up-tempo first single, "The Right Kinda Lover") and new jack swing maestro Teddy Riley (on LaBelle's mellow yet hypnotic cover of DeBarge's "All This Love"). The true standout, however, is "Stay in My Corner." That song, with its gospel undertones, features Labelle wailing as only she can, holding out her famous long notes and delivering a truly mesmerizing performance." Alan Jones from Music Week wrote, "Patti LaBelle shows rare and admirable restraint here [...] Those who love Ms Labelle, but not her excess, will enjoy this superb compromise; those discovering her for the first time are in for a treat."

== Track listing ==
Gems track listing
No.	Title	Writer(s)	Producer(s)	Length
1.	"I'm in Love"	Denise Rich; Patti LaBelle; Sami McKinney; Fred White	K.C. Porter; McKinney	4:16
2.	"All This Love"	El DeBarge; Teddy Riley; Rodney Jerkins	Riley	5:01
3.	"The Right Kinda Lover"	Ann Bennett-Nesby; James Harris III; Terry Lewis; Jimmy Wright	Jimmy Jam & Terry Lewis; Wright	4:52
4.	"This Word Is All"	Carol Duboc; LaBelle; McKinney; Wright	Riley	4:40
5.	"Too Good to Be Through"	Harris; Lewis	Jimmy Jam & Terry Lewis; Wright	4:19
6.	"I Never Stopped Loving You"	Alex Brown; McKinney; Kenny Moore	Porter; McKinney	5:00
7.	"Stay in My Corner"	Wade Flemons; Bobby Miller; Barrett Strong	James "Budd" Ellison	5:21
8.	"If I Didn't Have You"	Eugene "Lambchops" Curry; Bunny Sigler	Sigler	4:58
9.	"I Can't Tell My Heart What to Do"	McKinney; Steve Shockley; Aaron Smith	Porter; McKinney	4:47
10.	"Time Will Tell"	McKinney; Moore; Allee Willis	Porter; McKinney	4:59
11.	"Our World"	Ellison; LaBelle; McKinney; Nathaniel "Crockett" Wilkie	Ellison; Wilkie (ass.)	5:00
12.	"Come As You Are"	Lisa Dal Bello; McKinney	Porter; McKinney; Lisa Dalbello	4:17
Total length:				57:30

== Charts ==
=== Weekly charts ===
Weekly chart performance for Gems
Chart (1994)	Peak position
Australian Albums (ARIA)	132
US Billboard 200	48
US Top R&B/Hip-Hop Albums (Billboard)	7
US Top 75 R&B Albums (Cashbox)	5
US Top 200 Albums (Cashbox)	48

=== Year-end charts ===
Year-end chart performance for Gems
Chart (1994)	Position
US Top R&B/Hip-Hop Albums (Billboard)	45

== Certifications ==
Certifications for Gems
Region	Certification	Certified units/sales
United States (RIAA)	Gold	500,000^{^}
^{^} Shipments figures based on certification alone.
