= Maureen Steele =

American singer/songwriter (born 1958)

- Born: Maureen Sandstrom Steele; July 22, 1958 (age 68); Worcester, Massachusetts, U.S.
- Genres: Pop; dance-pop; post-disco
- Occupations: Singer; songwriter
- Instrument: Vocals
- Years active: 1977–1989
- Label: Motown

Maureen Sandstrom Steele (born July 22, 1958) is an American singer and songwriter.

After signing a recording contract with Motown, and notably becoming one of the very few white artists that were signed to the label at that time, Steele officially released her first song in 1984, "Boys Will Be Boys", which was featured as part of The Flamingo Kid film soundtrack, a romantic comedy starring Matt Dillon. It was subsequently released as a single, and peaked at No. 18 on Billboard's Hot Dance Music/Club Play chart in 1985. During that same year, Steele released her sole studio album, Nature of the Beast, which was produced by Steve Barri and her brother Bobby Sandstrom, the former of whom was the vice-president of A&R at Motown at that time, and oversaw big-selling releases by Lionel Richie and Rick James, among others. It peaked at No. 210 on the Billboard Bubbling Under the Top Pop Albums chart. Steele also contributed the track "She'll Burn You" to the post-apocalyptic science fiction-comedy film Radioactive Dreams (1985).

Steele's only single to chart on the Billboard Hot 100 was "Save the Night for Me", which peaked at No. 77. In 1986, she released her final single "One More Saturday Night", which was the theme song for the film of the same name, another comedy film, but it failed to chart.

After the failure of her career as a recording artist, Steele contributed backing vocals to albums by Smokey Robinson (Smoke Signals), Michael Lovesmith (Rhymes of Passion), Teen Dream (Let's Get Busy), Apollonia Kotero (Apollonia), and Michael Jeffries (Michael Jeffries).

== Personal life ==
In 1989, she married Mike Volante, and retired from the music industry in order to start a family. She then went under the name of Maureen Steele-Volante to work with her husband in the real estate business.

== Discography ==
Studio album

- Nature of the Beast (1985)

Singles

- "Boys Will Be Boys" (1985)
- "Save the Night for Me" (1985)
- "One More Saturday Night" (1986)
