= East of Angel Town =

Studio album by Peter Cincotti
- Released: 2007
- Genre: Pop; jazz; funk; rock
- Label: Sire Records

Peter Cincotti chronology
On the Moon (2004)	East of Angel Town (2007)	Metropolis (2012)

East of Angel Town is Peter Cincotti's third studio album, released on 29 October 2007.

== Track listing ==
All tracks are written by Peter Cincotti, John Bettis, except where noted.

No.	Title	Writer(s)	Length
1.	"Angel Town"	Cincotti, Bettis, Pia Cincotti	4:48
2.	"Goodbye Philadelphia"		4:30
3.	"Be Careful"		3:43
4.	"Cinderella Beautiful"		4:17
5.	"Make It Out Alive"	Cincotti	3:56
6.	"December Boys"		4:42
7.	"U B U"		4:35
8.	"Another Falling Star"		4:38
9.	"Broken Children"		4:13
10.	"Man on a Mission"		4:26
11.	"Always Watching You"	Cincotti	5:05
12.	"Witch's Brew"		5:12
13.	"The Country Life"	Cincotti	3:48

== Charts ==
=== Weekly charts ===
Chart (2007–09)	Peak position
Austrian Albums (Ö3 Austria)	59
Belgian Albums (Ultratop Wallonia)	26
French Albums (SNEP)	16
Italian Albums (FIMI)	30
Swiss Albums (Schweizer Hitparade)	22
US Heatseekers Albums (Billboard)	20
US Top Jazz Albums (Billboard)	5

=== Year-end charts ===
Chart (2007)	Position
French Albums (SNEP)	91
Chart (2008)	Position
Belgian Albums (Ultratop Wallonia)	98
French Albums (SNEP)	198

== Certifications ==
Region	Certification	Certified units/sales
France (SNEP)	Gold	75,000^{*}
^{*} Sales figures based on certification alone.
