= Susie Suh =

American singer

- Born: Los Angeles, California, U.S.
- Genres: Alternative; Folk rock
- Occupation: Singer-songwriter
- Years active: 2003–present
- Website: www.susiesuh.com

Susie Suh is an American singer and songwriter from Los Angeles, California.

== Early life and education ==
Born in Los Angeles, Susie Suh sang in a choir for the L.A.-based KTE TV station when she was a child, performing Korean folk songs and American pop and children's songs. She attended a boarding school in New England, where she self-released a six-track EP. As a college student, she continued performing and eventually drew the attention of Charles Koppelman and Don Rubin. She graduated from Brown University with a bachelor's degree in English Literature.

== Career ==
After auditioning for major label executives, she signed with Sony's Epic Records.

Her debut album, Susie Suh, was produced by Glen Ballard and released in 2005. Five songs from that album were used on the TV series One Tree Hill, among them "Recognition", "All I Want," and "Light on My Shoulder". "Shell", also from this self-titled release, co-written by Ballard, was featured on the soundtrack of the 2005 film Must Love Dogs. A one-minute crop of it was bundled with Sony Ericsson W800 mobile phones.

Following her debut, Suh released The Bakman Tapes – The Complete Edition in 2010 on her own label, Collective Records. The single “I Do” has received over 51 million streams on Spotify. In 2015, album track “Good Times” was featured on the final episode of the second season of NBC's The Night Shift and in Fox's Rosewood. Tracks from The Bakman Tapes also appeared in film and television, including Parenthood and Hart of Dixie.

Her single "Here with Me" is featured on season 1 of the television series The Blacklist, is played over the end credits of the 2017 film Oh Lucy!, and in 2019 in the film The Sun Is Also a Star. It received more than 51 million streams on Spotify.

In 2021 she released the album Invisible Love. Parade called the title track "a transcendent pop gem" and its video "hauntingly gorgeous." A special edition vinyl release was scheduled for 2022. As of May 2022 her songs had been streamed more than 125 million times on Spotify, and in 2021 she was added to more than 130,000 Spotify playlists.

Her music has been compared to that of Fiona Apple and Aimee Mann. She has cited Joni Mitchell and Beth Gibbons among her influences.

== Discography ==
=== Studio albums ===
- Susie Suh (2005)
- The Bakman Tapes – The Complete Edition (2010)
- Invisible Love (2021)

=== Extended plays ===
- Everywhere (2015)
- Evening Prayer (2019)
