= David Jordan (singer) =

English singer-songwriter (born 1985)

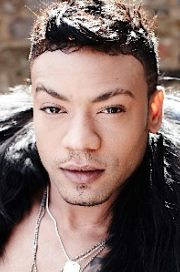
- Jordan in 2012

Background information
- Born: David Keith Arratoon; 13 September 1985 (age 41)
- Origin: Barnet, London, England
- Genres: Pop, Country, Rock, R&B
- Occupations: Singer, Songwriter, Adult Content Creator
- Years active: 2007–2014
- Label: ZTT / Mercury/

David Keith Arratoon (born 13 September 1985) in Barnet, London), known as David Jordan, is an English singer-songwriter. His debut album, Set the Mood, was released in October 2007, peaking at number 13 on the UK Albums Chart.

== Biography ==
Born to a mother from Montserrat and a father from Calcutta, Jordan has been writing pop-rock songs since he was 11 (after his parents split). Growing up, his music idol was Prince. After spending the first nine years of his life in North London, when his parents split up Jordan chose to live with his grandmother in Enfield until he moved into a council flat in Finchley aged 16. As a teenager, Jordan associated with a group of young hopefuls signed to Simon Fuller's 19 management company, including a young Amy Winehouse, with whom he remained friends. Jordan was obsessed with songwriting and gaining a record deal. He would study drama at college during the day, work at Starbucks in New Oxford Street in the evening and then work on songs with his producer friend Jack Freegard at Fortress Studios in Old Street.

== Career ==
=== 2007–08: Set the Mood ===
On 22 October 2007, he released "Place in My Heart" as the lead single from his debut studio album. He released his debut studio album, Set the Mood, on 29 October 2007, peaking to number 13 on the UK Albums Chart; the album also charted in France and Switzerland. On 4 February 2008, he released "Sun Goes Down" as the second single from the album, peaking to number 4 on the UK Singles Chart. He performed the song at the Royal Variety Performance. On 4 May 2008, he released "Move On" as the third single from the album, peaking to number 68 on the UK Singles Chart.

=== 2011–present ===
On 26 March 2011, Jordan uploaded a music video for "Don't Wanna (Hear You Say)" to YouTube. In July 2011, he featured on Kane Ricca's single "One Nation" with Defi'.

On 5 April 2012, he uploaded a music video for "Fallen Star" to YouTube. On 25 July 2012, he uploaded a music video for "Wild, Wasted & Wonderful" to YouTube and published 8 acoustic videos on YouTube made by Methodworks.

In spring of 2012, he applied for the lead dancer role as Michael Jackson in the Thriller Live musical at the West End, London. He got the role and debuted as Michael Jackson at the Lyric Theatre in the West End in July 2012.

In April 2021 David Jordan announced that new music would be coming soon.

== Discography ==
=== Albums ===
Title	Album details	Peak chart positions			
Title	Album details	UK	FRA	IRE	SWI
Set the Mood	Released: 29 October 2007; Labels: ZTT / Mercury; Formats: CD, digital download	13	159	93	60

=== Singles ===
==== As lead artist ====
Year	Single	Peak chart positions			Album
Year	Single	UK	IRE	SWI	Album
2007	"Place in My Heart"^{[A]}	–	—	—	Set the Mood
2008	"Sun Goes Down"	4	20	42	Set the Mood
2008	"Move On"	68	—	—	Set the Mood
"—" denotes single that did not chart or was not released

==== As featured artist ====
Year	Single	Album
2011	"One Nation" (Kane Ricca featuring David Jordan and Defi')	—N/a
2013	"Frequency"	—N/a

=== Music videos ===
Year	Song
2007	"Place in My Heart"
2007	"Sun Goes Down"
2008	"Move On"
2009	"Set The Mood"
2011	"Don't Wanna (Hear You Say)"
2012	"Fallen Star"
2012	"Wild, Wasted & Wonderful"
2012	"Like a Winner"
2014	"Sun Goes Down 2014"

== Notes ==
- A Place in My Heart was re-released in 2008.
