= Susie Suh (album) =

Studio album by Susie Suh
- Released: March 29, 2005
- Length: 40:35
- Label: Epic
- Producer: Glen Ballard

Susie Suh chronology
Susie Suh (2005)	The Bakman Tapes, Pt. 1 (2009)

Susie Suh is the debut album by American singer-songwriter Susie Suh. It was released on Epic Records in 2005. The CD is marked with the Copy Control logo.

== Critical reception ==
Professional ratings
Review scores
Source	Rating
AllMusic	4/5 stars

Alex Henderson of AllMusic concludes his review with, "The singer/songwriter field is amazingly crowded these days, but Suh is a cut above many of the female singer/songwriters who emerged in the early and mid-2000s and shows considerable promise on her first album."

Liane Hansen of NPR wrote, "Suh's lyrics are introspective. And though she shares a homonym with wailer Siouxsie Sioux of Banshees fame, her music is on the softer side."

== Track listing ==
All tracks are written by Susie Suh. "Shell" and "Lucille" were co-written by Glen Ballard

No.	Title	Length
1.	"Won't You Come Again"	3:45
2.	"Your Battlefield"	4:04
3.	"Shell"	4:24
4.	"Harmony"	3:52
5.	"Seasons Change"	5:02
6.	"Light on My Shoulder"	4:19
7.	"Lucille"	3:16
8.	"Petrified to Be God-Like"	4:10
9.	"Recognition"	3:23
10.	"All I Want"	4:20
Total length:		40:35

== Media appearances ==
"Recognition", "All I Want", "Seasons Change", and "Light on My Shoulder" have been played in the American drama series One Tree Hill. "Shell" was featured on the soundtrack to the film Must Love Dogs.

== Personnel ==
=== Musicians ===
- Susie Suh – guitar, piano, vocals
- Glen Ballard – keyboards, piano, string arrangements
- Matt Chamberlain – drums
- Jimmy Johnson – bass
- Michael Landau – guitar
- Tim Pierce – guitar
- Benmont Tench – organ (Hammond), piano, music contractor

=== Production ===
- Glen Ballard – producer
- Charles Koppelman – executive producer
- Don Rubin – executive producer
- Doug Sax – mastering
- Tom Sweeney – assistant engineer
- Kevin Mills – assistant engineer
- Scott Campbell – engineer, mixing
- Jez Colin – mixing
- Michelle Holme – art direction
- Sheri G. Lee – art direction
- Jolie Levine-Aller – music contractor, production coordination

Track information and credits adapted from the album's liner notes.
