= Incredible (Clique Girlz album) =

Studio album by Clique Girlz
- Released: August 27, 2008
- Recorded: 2007–2008
- Genres: Pop; pop rock; teen pop
- Length: 63:10
- Label: Interscope/Geffen

Clique Girlz chronology
Clique Girlz EP (2008)	Incredible (2008)	Smile EP (2008)

Singles from Incredible
- 1. "Then I Woke Up" Released: April 6, 2008; 2. "Incredible" Released: June 10, 2008; 3. "Smile" Released: October 21, 2008

Incredible is the first and only studio album by girl group Clique Girlz. In promotion of the upcoming album, an EP entitled Clique Girlz was released in April 2008. The band also released "Incredible," a single available for digital download on iTunes and other online music stores. They also released another EP entitled Smile to iTunes. Their last release was an EP called Incredible.

== Promotion ==
The album features the singles: "Then I Woke Up", "Incredible," and "Smile." "Then I Woke Up" and "Smile" both reached #2 on the US Hot Singles Sales chart. It also includes many other songs that have been released before by the Clique Girlz, such as "Smile" and "The Difference In Me" from their debut EP, Clique Girlz.

Incredible was supposed to come out in the summer of 2008, but the album was pushed back several times until its eventual cancellation.

The Clique Girlz have filmed music videos for "Then I Woke Up", "Incredible" and "You Think". The videos are all available on iTunes. The official Vevo however only has "Then I Woke Up" and "Incredible".

The group toured extensively throughout 2008, and performed "Incredible" on The Today Show on June 17, 2008. The Clique Girlz touring consisted of many other promotional appearances opening for artists such as: Demi Lovato, the Jonas Brothers, The Cheetah Girls and the Backstreet Boys.

== Track listing ==
No.	Title	Writer(s)	Length
1.	"Then I Woke Up"	Kara DioGuardi; Samantha Moore; John Shanks	3:49
2.	"Without You"	DioGuardi; Marti Frederiksen	3:19
3.	"Incredible"	Andrew Fromm; Eddie Galan; Andrew Lane; Adam Reily	4:34
4.	"Never Gonna Fly"	Lauren Christy; Graham Edwards; Scott Spock; Clique Girlz; Gary Clark; Paul Harris	3:02
5.	"You Think"	Lane; D. Steven Thomas; Douglas Shawe	3:29
6.	"How Do You Like Me So Far?"	Matthew Gerrard	3:00
7.	"Ordinary Girl"	Christy; Edwards; Spock; Clark	2:52
8.	"It's a Beautiful Thing"	Steve Booker; Gerrard; Bridget Benenate	3:12
9.	"My Time"	Jude Cole; Jason Wade	3:26
10.	"Shoot the Moon"	Christopher Faizi; Ken Hauptman; Jeannie Lurie	3:36
11.	"So Hard, So Far"	Corky James; Harvey Mason, Jr.; Steven Russell; Damon Thomas; James Fauntleroy II	3:29
12.	"What It's Like to Be Me"	Evan Rogers; Carl Sturken	3:20
13.	"Smile"	Christy; Edwards; Spock; Clark; Harris	3:09
14.	"Angels"	DioGuardi; Greg Wells	4:28
15.	"The Difference in Me"	DioGuardi; Moore; Shanks	3:48
16.	"Who Wouldn't Wanna"	Erik "Bluetooth" Griggs; James; Mason, Jr.; Thomas; Fauntleroy II; Russell	3:39
17.	"A Word for You"	Christy; Edwards; Spock; Clark	3:15
18.	"Heaven Is a Place on Earth"	Rick Nowels; Ellen Shipley	3:43
Total length:			63:10

== Release history ==
Region	Date	Label
Japan	August 27, 2008	Interscope/Geffen
