= Set the Mood =

Studio album by David Jordan
- Released: 29 October 2007
- Recorded: 2006–2007
- Genre: Pop, rock, soul
- Length: 39:12
- Label: ZTT / Mercury

David Jordan chronology
Set the Mood	TBA

Singles from Set the Mood
- 1. "Place in My Heart" Released: 22 October 2007; 2. "Sun Goes Down" Released: 4 February 2008; 3. "Move On" Released: 4 May 2008

Set the Mood is the debut studio album of British singer-songwriter David Jordan. Before the release of the album, Jordan had written between 60 and 100 songs. These songs were then whittled down to 11 for the final track listing of Set the Mood. The album was produced by Trevor Horn, who has also worked with Seal and the English dance-pop band Frankie Goes To Hollywood. "Place in My Heart" was released as Set the Mood's lead single on 22 October. The album was released simultaneously in the UK, France and Germany a week later. Set the Mood and Jordan received many positive reviews following the album's 29 October release. The singer was dubbed the British version of Justin Timberlake, and compared with artists such as Lenny Kravitz, Prince and Michael Jackson.

== Production ==
Prior to recording Set the Mood, Jordan had written between 60 and 100 songs, within a four-year time period. The singer's record company then chose the best 11 songs for the album. "Sun Goes Down" was written when the musician was 16 years old. Jordan stated that the song was about the parties he and his friends held at Old Street Studios in London, and what he would see there. "It's about when the sun goes down in London, all the madness starts." The album was produced by Trevor Horn, who has also produced for Seal and the English dance-pop band Frankie Goes To Hollywood. Horn assembled the album over 18 months before the final product was created. Jordan praised the producer, stating, "He's everything people say he is; he's a genius really and I'm having a great time working with him". Jordan discovered by Horn's wife, Jill Sinclair, co-founder of ZTT Records. Initially, Jordan was not aware of who Horn was. "My reaction was, 'Who?' I'd never heard of ABC, Seal or Frankie Goes To Hollywood. I wasn't aware of Trevor's amazing track record but when I discovered who he'd been involved with I felt honoured."

== Release and reception ==
"Sun Goes Down"
Audio sample of "Sun Goes Down"

"Place in My Heart" was released as Set the Mood's lead single on 22 October. The album was released simultaneously in the UK, France and Germany a week later. Set the Mood and Jordan received many positive reviews following the album's release. The singer was dubbed the British version of Justin Timberlake, and compared with artists such as Lenny Kravitz, Prince and Michael Jackson. The Times described the album as being "soft-rock nostalgia, with the odd nod to Justin Timberlake's crossover style". They noted that the "playground political" "Place in My Heart" was "pretty ace". Combined with the "naggingly catchy" "Move On" and the "positively Slavic" "Sun Goes Down", Set the Mood was summed up as being "enjoyably timewarped". "Love Song" was described by The Guardian as being "strikingly, struttingly Jacko-esque". Nigel Gould of The Belfast Telegraph compared the album's 1980s-style pop to Michael Jackson and the soul to British funk group Linx. The BBC declared that Set The Mood "works" as a soul pop album. They added that the singer "could possibly have been made in a laboratory, cloned from the DNA of Lenny Kravitz, Prince and Michael Jackson". Despite the positive reviews, Jordan insisted that his success hadn't changed him. "I still go home, make my own dinner and clean out the cat litter. I've yet to taste the trappings of pop stardom."

== Track listing ==
No.	Title	Length
1.	"On the Money"	3:33
2.	"Place in My Heart"	3:51
3.	"Sun Goes Down"	3:16
4.	"Set The Mood"	3:27
5.	"Love Song"	3:16
6.	"Move On"	4:00
7.	"Sweet Prince"	3:09
8.	"If I'm in Love"	3:15
9.	"Glorious Day"	3:33
10.	"Only Living Soul"	4:03
11.	"Fight The World"	3:40

== Charts ==
=== Weekly charts ===
Chart (2007–08)	Peak position
French Albums (SNEP)	159
Swiss Albums (Schweizer Hitparade)	60
UK Albums (OCC)	13

=== Year-end charts ===
Chart (2008)	Position
UK Albums (OCC)	148
