= Nikki Clan =

Mexican pop rock band

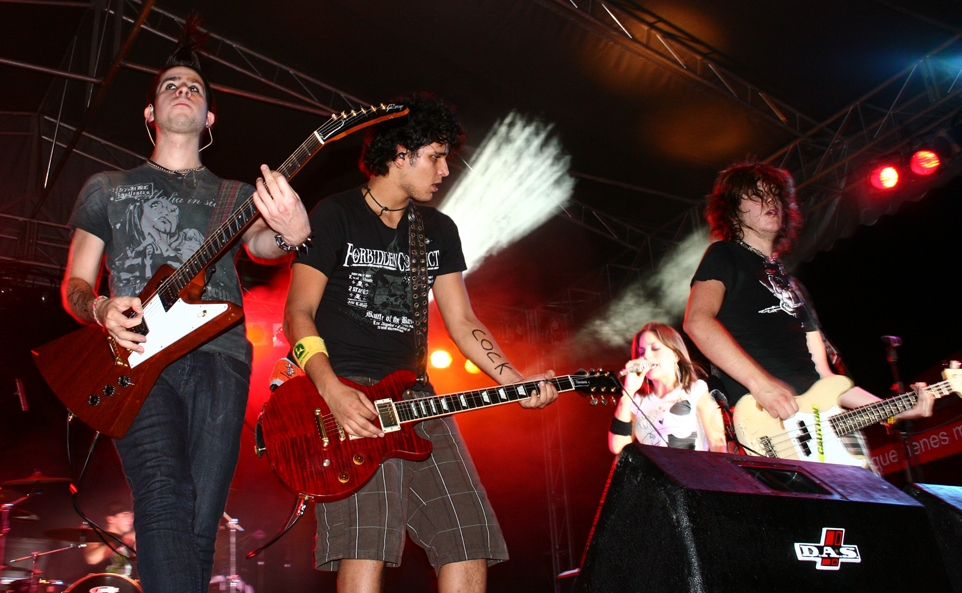

Background information
- Origin: Nogales, Mexico
- Genres: Pop rock; pop punk; latin pop; teen pop; power pop; skate punk
- Years active: 2005 - 2010, 2022
- Labels: Sony BMG
- Website: www.nikkiclan.com

Nikki Clan is a Mexican pop rock band from Nogales, Sonora and Mexicali, Baja California. It consists of Yadira Gianola, Alberto Espinosa, José Antonio Dabdoub, Ángel Yanez. It was created in 2005 by known producer Abelardo Vázquez (also producer of Reik), and released its first album in 2006. The self-titled album, Nikki Clan, is part of a five-album contract with Sony BMG. "Mirame" (Look at me) was released as the first single with tremendous success. Its name is in honor of Nikki Sixx, an idol for Gianola.

Nikki Clan disbanded in 2010, following Gianola's first pregnancy, but they reunited in 2022 as part of the 2000s Pop Tour.

== Discography ==
=== Nikki Clan (2006) ===
Charts: No. 20 (MEX), No. 10 (MEX POP)

Track listing

1. Mírame (Look at me)
2. Corazón abierto (Open heart)
3. No te amo (I don't love you)
4. Te siento (I feel you)
5. A mi lado (By my side)
6. No me digas que no (Don't tell me no)
7. Dame un día más (Give me one more day)
8. Dímelo a mí (Tell me)
9. Grita y llora (Scream and Cry)
10.Cómo me dejas así (How you leave me like this)
11.Celos (Jealous)
12.Qué más da (Whatever happens now)

Standard edition bonus tracks

13. No quiero verte (I don't want to see you)

Re-issue bonus tracks

13. No quiero verte (I don't want to see you)
14. Niñas mal (Bad girls)

=== No será igual (2008) ===
Track listing

1. No Será Igual (It Won't Be The Same)
2. Yo No Te Puedo Olvidar (I Can't Forget You)
3. Ya No Tengas Miedo (Don't Be Afraid)
4. Te Quiero Tanto (I Want You So Much)
5. Cuando (When)
6. Esta noche te voy a besar (This night i'm going to kiss you)
7. Pensando en ti (Thinking about you)
8. No Sabes Dar Amor (You Don't Know How to Give Love)
9. Las Curvas De Esa chica (This Chick's Curves)
10. Después De Todo (After Everything)
11. Solo para mí (Only mine)
12. Sin Ti (Without You)

== Films ==
The song "Niñas mal" (Bad girls) was used on the Mexican film "Niñas Mal".
