= Hope 7 =

Pop rock band

Hope 7 was a pop rock band that performed together from 2002 to 2006. The band members consisted of Kristi McClave (lead singer), Dave Noble (guitarist), Chevy Martinez (bassist), and Chase Duddy (drummer).

== Early years ==
Performing since the age of six, McClave was discovered by record producer Rodney Jerkins. McClave was then chosen by Antonina Armato and Tim James to be a featured vocalist for the pop group 3Gs. They later recorded the song "Crush" for The Princess Diaries soundtrack. However, finding the right mix of singers for the group proved difficult, and 3Gs eventually disbanded. McClave continued to work with some of the same producers, leading to a more rock-oriented sound. McClave provided the track, "Breakthrough", for the Legally Blonde 2: Red, White & Blonde soundtrack and The Cheetah Girls soundtrack. The artist for that particular track was Hope 7, even though the band's lineup was not final at the time. McClave was signed to Hollywood Records and toured with the MTV TRL tour.

== Performing years ==
In early 2004, Noble, Martinez and Duddy joined the band to fully form Hope 7. The song "Breakthrough" was also featured in The Cheetah Girls soundtrack, and the music video for the song was played on Disney Channel, increasing the band's popularity. The band toured with the ATV Pro Volleyball tournament and also released the song "I Want Everything", which was featured in the soundtrack for the 2004 film Sleepover and the 2005 Disney Channel film Go Figure.

The band released their self-titled album, Hope 7, on March 15, 2005 with Trauma Records. It was their only album release.

Hope 7 disbanded after the release of their first album. They are no longer performing together.

== Discography ==
=== Albums ===
- Hope 7 (2005)

=== Singles ===
- "Breakthrough" (2004)
