= Tim Pierce =

- Born: 1958 (age 67–68); Albuquerque, New Mexico, U.S.
- Genres: Alternative rock; pop; heavy metal
- Occupation: Session musician
- Instruments: Guitar; mandolin
- Label: PRA
- Website: timpierceguitar.com

Tim Pierce (born 1958) is an American session guitarist. He has worked for artists such as Joe Cocker, Crowded House, Goo Goo Dolls, Michael Jackson, Beth Hart, Roger Waters, Alice Cooper, Johnny Hallyday, Phil Collins, and the Cheetah Girls.

Pierce's parents were not musicians, although, unbeknownst to Pierce, his father used to play the trumpet in his youth. He first tasted mainstream success in the early 1980s, when he began recording with Rick Springfield, who was enjoying success with his hit "Jessie's Girl". In addition to playing on the studio recordings that followed, he also joined Springfield's touring band throughout the 1980s and appears in several of Springfield's music videos from the era. Pierce and his wife Patty have been married since 1984, and live in Los Angeles, California. Patty's son Nigel Lundemo is Tim's partner in his educational membership business for guitarists, called the "Masterclass".

He has played on many hit songs including contributing second-guitar parts on Crowded House's "Don't Dream It's Over", mandolins and slide guitar on Goo Goo Dolls' "Iris", a rhythm guitar part during the bridge of Michael Jackson's "Black or White", which was inspired by the work of Mötley Crüe, and almost all guitar parts on the original recording of "Runaway" by Bon Jovi.

In 1995, Pierce released a solo album, Guitarland, on PRA Records.

In 2014, Pierce started a YouTube channel, on which he offers guitar tips from his years in the music industry.

== Discography ==
- Tim Pierce discography
