= Clique Girlz =

American girl group

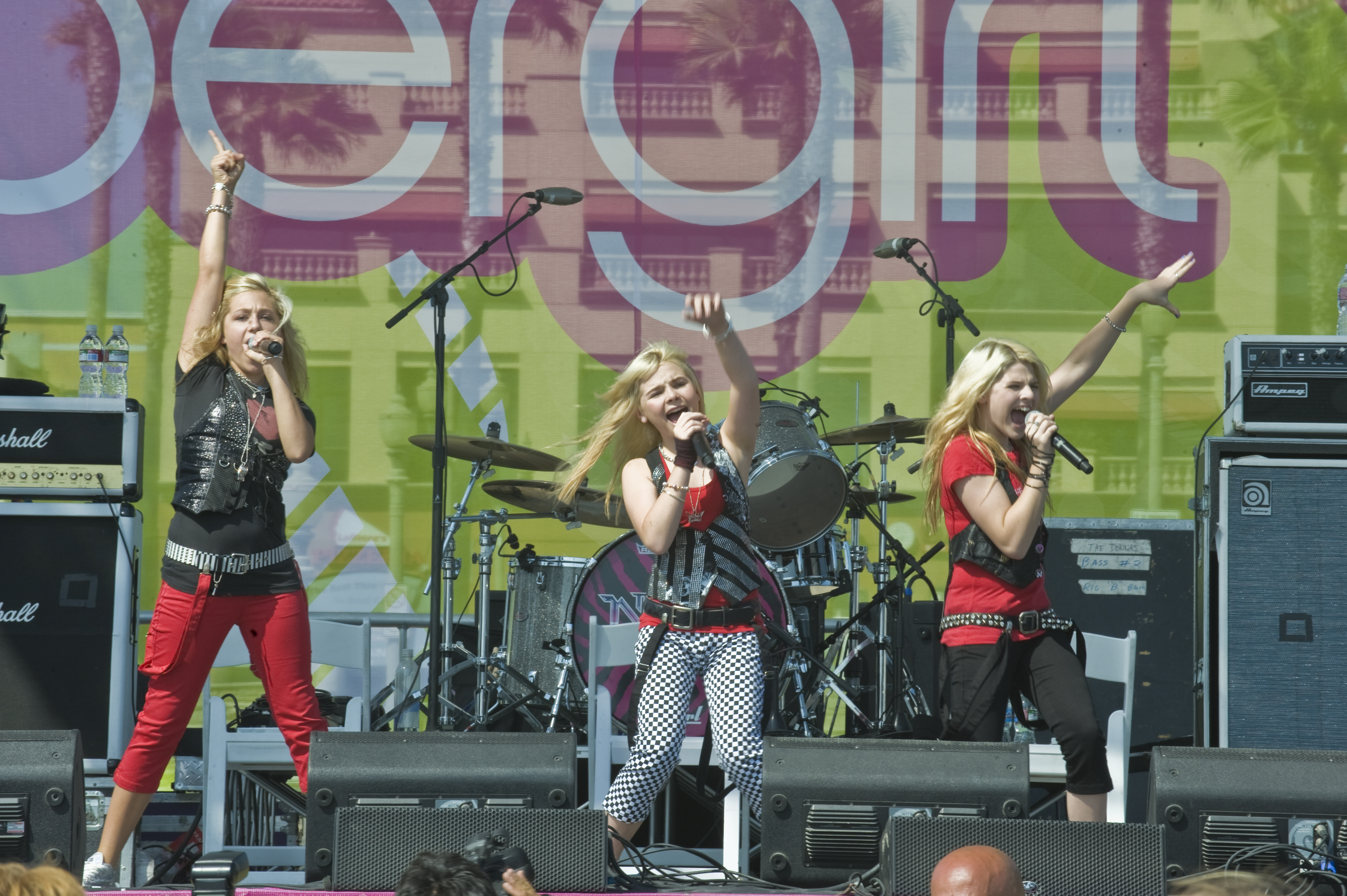
- The original lineup, Ariel, Paris, and Destinee, onstage in 2008

Background information
- Genre: Pop rock
- Years active: 2004–2009
- Labels: Interscope; Universal
- Spinoffs: Destinee & Paris
- Past members: Destinee Monroe; Paris Monroe; Ariel Moore; Sara Diamond
- Website: destineeandparis.com

Clique Girlz was an American girl group consisting of sisters Destinee and Paris Monroe, alongside their friend Ariel Moore and later, Sara Diamond. The original group consisted of Destinee, Paris, and Ariel. In 2009, Ariel Moore left the group for unnamed private reasons which resulted in Sara joining the group. The group split up in 2009 when Sara Diamond left the group.

== History ==
=== 2004–2007: As Clique ===
In 2004, Destinee and Paris Monroe formed a group with their childhood friend Ariel Moore whom they met at school. Then, the three started to perform together as a group, named Clique (before they were signed), with the Monroes' mother, Lenore, as their manager. The group recorded the song "Lemonade" for Alex's Lemonade with the label Rhino (a part of Warner Bros. Records).

At a Backstreet Boys concert, band member Howie D invited them to open a show. They opened for other artists including Billy Ray Cyrus, The Click Five, Kirk Franklin, and The Jonas Brothers.

=== 2007–2008: Incredible ===
At the beginning of 2007, they left their hometown to go to Hollywood for a meeting and never left. Jimmy Iovine signed them to his Interscope label. The name of the group was changed to Clique Girlz because there was already a group called "Clique". On March 28, 2008, they went to Tokyo, Japan to work on their first full-length album, Incredible. The following month, they released a three-song EP. That summer the girls did several shows at Six Flags and other venues opening for artists including Drake Bell and Demi Lovato, performing songs from the girls' upcoming album. They later traveled to Japan for the second time to promote their upcoming album. They appeared on several Japanese TV shows and performed at the MTV Vibrations 2008. Their first studio album, Incredible, was released August 27, 2008 in Japan. Around this time, they became the opening act for The Cheetah Girls' One World Tour.

They performed at the Fourth of July Philadelphia Fireworks Show and Macy's Thanksgiving Day Parade, and also participated in special events including the Grammys, Kids Choice Awards, Teen Choice Awards and MTV Movie Awards.

Music videos for the songs "Then I Woke Up", "Incredible", and "You Think" were filmed the same year and the girls did several TV appearances on shows like The Today Show, performing songs like "Incredible", "The Difference In Me" and "Then I Woke Up".

An acoustic version of their song "Incredible" was included in the AT&T Team USA Olympic Soundtrack 2008.

=== 2009: New lineup ===
On January 24, 2009, Tommy2.Net reported that Ariel Moore had left the group. On January 31, auditions were held at Center Staging in Burbank, CA to find a new member. That same day, Ariel Moore posted a video on YouTube announcing that she had left the group for personal reasons that she would like to keep private. In late February, pictures from a photo shoot for Baby Bottle Pop surfaced featuring the new member, Sara Diamond. On February 27, they confirmed on their website that Diamond joined the group and did their first ever interview with Tommy2.Net. Diamond was let go by the group in late April for unknown reasons.

=== 2010–2012: Destinee & Paris ===
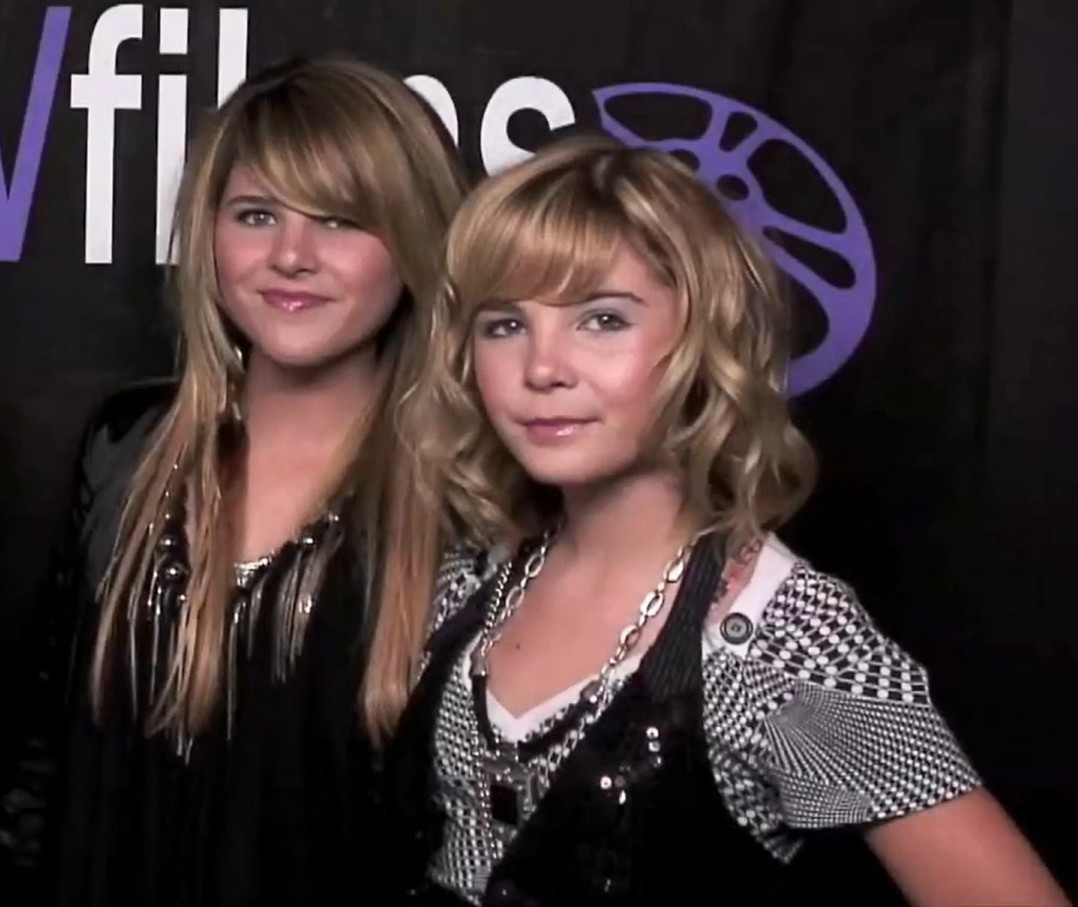
Destinee and Paris Monroe in 2009

The Clique Girlz disbanded in 2009. In 2010, Destinee and Paris Monroe formed their own group, simply titled Destinee & Paris. The girls posted on their official website that their debut album (as a duo) would come out in late 2010. Also on their website, they posted snippets of four new songs from their upcoming album: "Go Your Own Way" (Cover from Fleetwood Mac), "Sweet Sarah," "It's Over," and "Heart of Mine." The girls shot the music video for their then second single, "Pretend," on Saturday, June 5, 2010. The release date as of August 2011 has not been confirmed, leading many to believe the video will not be released. The girls released a song for the "Despicable Me" movie soundtrack, "I'm on a Roll." On their Facebook page they said their album would be called "Heart of Mine" and they were going to be touring again soon.

Via Twitter, Destinee and Paris announced new single, "True Love," and was released on August 9, 2011. They also toured with Britney Spears on her Femme Fatale Tour. "True Love" was released as scheduled on their MySpace page, then was released as a digital download on August 23, 2011. It was also performed in one of the episodes of the Disney Channel Original Series, So Random on March 25, 2012.

On June 28, 2012, the duo released "Pretend" on YouTube.

== Former members ==
=== Paris Monroe ===
Paris Quinn Monroe (2004–2009) (born January 9, 1996) from Egg Harbor Township, New Jersey was described as the "princess" of the group, and her symbol was a crown, which she said she loved as a fashion statement. Her signature color was pink. She was the youngest of the group. She also plays the piano. She was in a duo with her sister, Destinee. They were simply called Destinee & Paris. They have made new songs since they released their first song "True Love". They have done more since, including "Pretend", and "I'm On A Roll" and many more.

=== Destinee Monroe ===
Destinee Rae Monroe (2004–2009) (born June 16, 1994) from Egg Harbor Township, New Jersey was described as the "rock girl" of the group. Her symbol was a star because when she was little she had something in her eye and her mom said it was a star. Her signature color was blue. Destinee's hobbies include singing and playing guitar, violin and piano. She was in Destinee & Paris, a duo with her sister, Paris. Destinee & Paris was founded in 2010.

=== Ariel Moore ===
Ariel Alexis Moore (2004–2009) (born July 27, 1994) Ariel's group symbol was hearts "because she always wants to help others and has a big heart", and she has also said that she chose that symbol because she always liked to draw hearts. Her signature color was purple. Ariel's other hobbies are dancing and reading.

She went on to sing with a new girl group, No More Drama (NMD). She later released some solo songs, including "Living on the Edge", "Flip the Frequency", and "Don't Stop Believing".

=== Sara Diamond ===
Sara Maxine Diamond (2009) (born January 5, 1995) from Montreal, has been singing and performing since age five. She has also opened for singers Roberta Flack and Bonnie Tyler at Montreal's Bell Centre. She also acts, models and plays piano. Her symbol was a heart, because she loves to care for people, and her color was red. She was introduced as a member of the Clique Girlz in 2009, but has since left the group for unknown reasons.

== Discography ==
=== Albums ===
- 2008: Clique Girlz (EP)
- 2008: Incredible
- 2008: Smile (EP)
- 2009: Incredible (EP)

=== Singles ===
Title	Year	Charts	Album
Title	Year	US Sales	Album
"Then I Woke Up"	2008	2	Clique Girlz
"Incredible"	2008	–	Incredible
"Smile"	2008	2	Smile

=== Music videos ===
List of music videos, showing year released and director(s)
Title	Year	Director(s)	Ref.
"Then I Woke Up"	2008	Scott Speer	
"Incredible"	2008	None	
"Incredible" (Accoutic Version)	2008	None	
"You Think" (Accoutic Version)	2008	None	
"Here With Me Now"	2008	None	
