= Maybe California =

Single by Tori Amos

from the album Abnormally Attracted to Sin
- Released: May 19, 2009
- Recorded: December 2007
- Studio: Martian Engineering (Cornwall)
- Length: 4:25
- Label: Universal Republic
- Songwriter: Tori Amos
- Producer: Tori Amos

Tori Amos singles chronology
| "Welcome to England" (2009) | "Maybe California" (2009) | "A Silent Night with You" (2009) |

"Maybe California" is a song by American singer-songwriter and pianist Tori Amos from her tenth studio album Abnormally Attracted to Sin (2009). It was released as a promotional single May 19, 2009 by Universal Republic as a digital download only.

== Background and release ==
The song is a sparse ballad production featuring piano and vocals by Amos with light percussion and lush string arrangements. Thematically, the lyrics deals with a mother who has fallen into despair over the inability to care for her family's needs, and is contemplating suicide as a way out. Amos observed that women often quietly shoulder the burden of keeping a family intact, especially in times of emotional and financial strain, stating that Maybe California comes out of that kind of crisis:

The song is about the mother’s role in our new world, where so many men are losing their jobs and the women are not, because they’re cheaper. What is that doing to a home? If the mothers start breaking down then everything starts breaking down [...] We’ve all been in that place where you think "if i just take myself out of their life then it will be ok". It is an escape, but at the time when you don’t feel like there’s anything you can do, and maybe if you’re out of the way it could get bette, because there’s no solution. This is a political statement. In Maybe California it needs to be told from the personal.

Amos made the song, its video and ringtone available to download for free on Mother's Day as a gift, so that mothers everywhere could "know that they are seen and appreciated".

A new version of Maybe California was recorded with a full orchestra as an iTunes bonus track for inclusion on Amos' 2012 retrospective release Gold Dust.

== Music video ==
As with all the tracks on Abnormally Attracted to Sin, Maybe California has an accompanying "visualette" composed of material filmed during Amos' previous tour supporting American Doll Posse. The video clip features Amos driving a car and pensively moving around a park, sidewalks, along the seaside and cliffs while wearing Haute couture clothes. The video culminates in Amos standing on the edge of a cliff and reaching out her arms, as if to give a hand.

The music video was included on a DVD accompanying the deluxe edition of the album.

== Reception ==
The song was met with positive reviews by critics, who found the simple production and confessional content to be an enjoyable and touching return to the style of Amos' earlier recordings. Rolling Stone named Maybe California the standout track on the album. PopMatters also said the song was a highlight, stating that "Perhaps most satisfying of all of it is the realization that [it] is as wrenching a song as she’s ever written, so quiet in its despair, but so clear at the same time". BBC Music's review likewise stated that the simple ballad was archetypal Amos. All Music Guide's review finds it to be "beautifully composed and delivered". Slant Magazine's review called the song "a frankly stunning plea". The reviewer for Wears The Trousers felt the song has "some genuinely touching moments but lyrically is perhaps too direct". SPIN magazine, while negative in their review of the album, singled out Maybe California as the track to download.

== Charts and certifications ==
Although it did not chart anywhere else, Maybe California reached #1 in Portugal.

| Title | Chart | Position |
|---|---|---|
| "Maybe California" (2009) | Portugal | 1 |
