= Welcome to England =

Single by Tori Amos

from the album Abnormally Attracted to Sin
- Released: April 14, 2009
- Recorded: August 2007
- Studio: Martian Engineering (Cornwall)
- Genre: Alternative rock; baroque pop; electronica
- Length: 4:08
- Label: Universal Republic
- Songwriter: Tori Amos
- Producer: Tori Amos

Tori Amos singles chronology
"Bouncing Off Clouds" (2007)	"Welcome to England" (2009)	"Maybe California" (2009)

"Welcome to England" is a song by American singer-songwriter and pianist Tori Amos, appearing on her tenth solo studio album Abnormally Attracted to Sin (2009). It was released as the lead digital single from the studio album on April 14, 2009 by Universal Motown Republic Group, which also marks as her first single released from the label. Written and produced by Amos herself, just like the rest of the album, the song was recorded at her husband's studio in England, Martian Studios.

Musically, the song is a mid-tempo alternative rock song that features a variety of classical music, including influences of britpop, piano rock, baroque pop, ambient music and chamber pop music, along with modern electronica influences. The song's development discusses a woman who has left everything, including her family, friends and lifestyle, to start a new life with her lover. She has cited her husband as her inspiration towards the song, due to her constant move to England. Lyrical themes involve love, departure and family.

Contemporary critics were generally favorable towards the song, who commended the personal subject matter and production. However, some critics felt it lacked originality and did not live up to expectations. Commercially, the song did not live up to expectations; The song only managed to peak inside the top ten in countries including New Zealand and the United States, where it peaked at four and ten. It did chart in Belgium, but only managed to peak at twenty-four and managed to chart outside the top 100 in Russia. To date, this is Amos' last charting single in any mainstream charts, until her 2012 single "Flavor" was released. An accompanying music video was shot for the single, which featured Amos as two characters; herself and Isabel, a character that was previously featured in her studio album, American Doll Posse. The music video features her walking around iconic landmarks around London, England.

== Background ==
Before the production of the single and the studio album Abnormally Attracted to Sin, Abnormally Attracted to Sin was intended to be an audio-visual project including an abundance of synchronizing visuals, and filming these Visualettes was a significant catalyst for the development of the album itself. Then Christian Lamb was hired to by Amos to shoot footage of her 2007 world tour for an intended live/concert DVD. However, there were disagreements between her and her record label Epic Records, so she left the record label, leaving Visualettes to be postponed. She was with Epic since the release of her seventh studio album, Scarlet's Walk (2002). After her leaving of the label, Amos officially stated that from now on, she would be releasing her future studio albums and singles independently. However, the idea was then scrapped as Amos signed a new deal to Universal Republic Records, making "Welcome to England" and Abnormally Attracted to Sin her first releases under the label.

Along with the photography with her studio album, she enlisted fashion photographer Karen Collins. She stated "I love the way [Collins] shoots women, It's not vulgar or demeaning, but I find it just sexy. They look empowered to me, and I like her style." The setting for the album's artwork is a cream-colored hotel room. "Welcome to England" was eventually featured on her Chapter/Visualette Index DVD, which is an alternate version of her album, The Road Chronicles. The song was recorded at her husband's studio Martian Studios in Cornwall, with additional mixing in 2009.

== Composition ==
"Welcome to England" is a mid-tempo alternative rock song that features a trip hop style, with britpop, baroque pop and ambient music. Thom Jurek from Allmusic said "Welcome to England," whose 4/4 loop, drifting piano, and blend of guitars (electric and acoustic), strings, and ambient sounds is rudimentary Amos at best, and boring at worst." Mike Ragogna from The Huffington Post compared the song to the work of Kate Bush. According to Musicsheets.com, the voice range of Amos' vocals span between G3# to D5# notes, with the publishing key at G Minor. The song is in common time and has been set moderately paced in 100 beats per minute. In the song, Tori represents a "diosyncratic, staccato vocal style underpinned with Mac Aladdin’s razor-sharp guitar accents, but the song simply meanders, like a walk along the cliffs of Dover." Artistdirect said the song features "organic piano against studio-created synths. It’s a juxtaposition of the organic and the inorganic." Music Fix said the song was a "dreary sounding, works in the context of the album, lying snugly on its bed of electronica immediately after the disarming Give."

Amos, identifying the song as a "love song", stated that her husband Mark Hawley was an inspiration towards the song, who wanted her to move to England with her for more privacy in their personal relationship. She explained to Drowned in Sound that the "desired goal" of the song, was "to be positive about a man, and yet ambivalent about a place." Amos added: "I really wanted the story to be about a woman who left her life, and her family, and her job, to follow her love – to follow her heart." Amos commented on the song's structure; "The sounds [of "Welcome to England"] were created around the feelings and working around the song structure; the structures were demanding certain arrangements. It came out sexy and modern."

In a UK video interview with ITN, she explains the reasoning behind "Welcome To England":

"Welcome To England" is really about a woman who has gone to live in her lover's world and it could be from LA to New York, it could be from Manchester to London, and she has left her friends, her family, everything--her job--to go be with him and create a new life. And as she took on his friends, his life, his family, she lost.

== Critical reception ==
"Welcome to England" received favorable reviews from music critics. Ed Miller from Drowned in Sound stated that the song is "both a return to classic Tori and autobiographical songwriting, and an indicator that this record is free from the high concepts that mark most of her 21st century output." Jurek commented "The refrain creates a bit of a hook, at least enough to catch the ear, but that's all." He also highlighted the song as an album standout. Chris Mincher from The A.V. Club had commented that while he enjoyed the song, as an alternative musician, he said that it would've been "better from actual rock bands". Ivorytowerz.com said "The end result is pleasant, but a bit lightweight, despite its lyrical foundation about seduction." Andie Noonan from The Southern Star declared the song as "classic Amos" and said "[The song] wouldn’t be out of place as an English folk song."

Ian Wade from BBC Music said that the song was "Amos-by-numbers". Ben Urdang from MusicOMH gave the song a positive review, and also highlighted the song on the album saying "Welcome To England is an enjoyable romp through Tori's own back catalogue, as she seems to meld various snippets of her material together to make a new song that's both familiar and new." Zac from Sputnikmusic gave it an acclaimed review, saying "Welcome To England is a fine piece of music to say the least" and concluded "Welcome To England is another tick on the reviewers form." A mixed review came from Margaret Wappler from the Los Angeles Times, saying ""Welcome to England" is a silken glove with a few dropped stitches, specifically a guitar line that sounds borrowed from an '80s sitcom theme."

== Commercial response ==
"Welcome to England" was not successful on the charts, mostly because the song was released as a digital-only single, and did not serve a CD single, though a promotional CD was released. Another main reason why was because Amos announced she would release her singles independently through major record labels. The song didn't manage to chart inside the US Billboard Hot 100, however, it did debut at number twenty-nine on the US Adult Album Alternative chart, but it later rose to number seventeen, and eventually peaked at number ten. The song became Amos' fifth top ten single to enter that chart, and is currently her last single to chart in the United States or any of its component charts.

In Belgium (Flanders), the song debuted at number twenty-nine on the issue week of 16 May 2009. On the issue date of 23 May 2009, the song peaked at number twenty-six and stayed in the charts for two weeks. This was her first charting single since 1996, with her single "Hey Jupiter" and was also her last charting single in that country.

The song didn't chart on the official New Zealand Singles Chart, however, it did chart on the official New Zealand Airplay Singles Chart. The song debuted at number eight on the chart. The song rose to seven on the issue date of May 24, 2009. The song eventually peaked at number four on the chart, staying there for two consecutive weeks and making it her highest-charting single in New Zealand (airplay charts only). It stayed in the charts for six weeks in total, and was her first charting single since "Cornflake Girl".

The song debuted at 279 on the Russian Singles Chart in its first week. The song risen twenty-nine spaces to number 250. In its fourth week, the song rose to the remaining peaking position at 232, with a total of 424 airplay requests during that week. The song dropped five spaces in its fifth week, and fell out that same week, staying in the charts for five weeks, with 403 airplay requests that week. To date, "Welcome to England" is Amos' last single currently to have charted on any existing record charts, until her 2012 single "Flavor" reached number one on the US Hot Dance Club Songs.

== Music video and promotion ==
Tori Amos shown in the music video in London, England, briefly shows her jumpsuit which features the American Flag.

The music video had made its premiere debut on Yahoo! Music on April 3, 2009. The video was the same version released on the "Abnormally Attracted to Sin" deluxe edition—a vignette of the dolls from American Doll Posse. The song starts with Amos walking around a historical building in London. The video later changes where Amos is walking around bridges and shores of England, where she wears a jumpsuit with the whole costume embraced with the American flag on it. It finishes with Amos with a blonde wig, which is her character "Isabel" (which is known on her American Doll Posse album), taking pictures of London inside of the London Eye. It has iconic landmarks in England including Buckingham Palace, Big Ben and the London Eye. According to Anna Pickard, she said that the video for the single is not a "music video", and is a "visualette", which is one of a series of visualettes that accompany the songs on Tori Amos's album. And because of this ultimately, Amos has not released an official music video for either "Welcome to England" and "Maybe California". Along with portraying herself, Amos can be seen portraying “the dolls” from 2007's American Doll Posse, in an apparent attempt at deconstructing that album's concept. In the music video, Amos herself, however is not feature and instead, it features the dolls; Tori (Amos herself) and Isabel, who is featured at the end of the video.

The music video received generally favorable reviews from critics. Pitchfork Media compared the fashion imagery to Lady Guinevere and Lady Liberty by saying "Grainy film footage of London serves as the backdrop for this latest vid from Tori Amos, whose costume changes take her from Lady Guinevere to Lady Liberty in a few quick shots." Pinkisthenewblog.com gave it a positive review saying "The video features Tori lookin’ fierce as hell in various locales in England. I think this video is our first indication at what the visualettes that will accompany each song on the album will look like. Very cool."

The song was first performed on The Late Late Show with Craig Ferguson with a band and two pianos. Also, she performed the single in an intimate show called "Acoustically Attracted to Sin", in which many songs from her catalog were performed with her Bösendorfer. She also frequently played the song on her Sinful Attraction Tour. There have been fan covered recorded for the song as well.

== Track listing ==
- CD single/Digital Download
1. "Welcome to England" (album version) – 4:08
- Digital EP
1. "Welcome to England" (album version) - 4:08
2. "Maybe California" (album version) - 4:24
3. "Fire to Your Plain" (album version) - 3:02

== Personnel ==
- Bösendorfer, synths, and vocals: Tori Amos
- Loops and drums: Matt Chamberlain
- Bass: Jon Evans
- Acoustic and electric guitars: Mac Aladdin

== Charts ==
Chart (2009)	Peak position
Belgium (Ultratip Bubbling Under Wallonia)	26
New Zealand (RIANZ)	4
Russia (Digital Chart)	232
US Adult Alternative Charts (Billboard)	10

== Release history ==
Region	Date	Format	Label
Australia	24 April 2009	Digital download (EP)	Universal Republic
Belgium	24 April 2009	Digital download (EP)	Universal Republic
Italy	24 April 2009	Digital download (EP)	Universal Republic
Germany	24 April 2009	Digital download (EP)	Universal Republic
Spain	24 April 2009	Digital download (EP)	Universal Republic
South America	24 April 2009	Digital download (EP)	Universal Republic
New Zealand	24 April 2009	Digital download (EP)	Universal Republic
France	1 May 2009	Digital Download	Universal
United States	19 May 2009	Digital Download	Universal Republic Records
United Kingdom	21 May 2009	Digital Download	Universal/Island
Germany	21 May 2009	Digital Download	Universal
United States	21 May 2009	Promotional CD single	Universal
United Kingdom	21 May 2009	Promotional CD single	Universal
Europe	21 May 2009	Promotional CD single	Universal
Germany	21 May 2009	Promotional CD single	Universal
