= Night of Hunters Tour =

2011 concert tour by Tori Amos

- Tour by Tori Amos
- Associated album: Night of Hunters
- Start date: September 28, 2011
- End date: December 22, 2011
- Legs: 3
- No. of shows: 27 in Europe; 4 in Africa; 14 in North America; 45 in total

Tori Amos concert chronology
- Summer 2010 (2010); Night of Hunters Tour (2011); Gold Dust Orchestral Tour (2012)

The Night of Hunters Tour was the eleventh world concert tour by American singer-songwriter Tori Amos in support of her twelfth studio album Night of Hunters. During the tour Amos was supported by the Apollon Musagète Quartett, making this her first tour with a string quartet. As well as playing select songs from Night of Hunters, Amos played various songs from her back catalogue rearranged by her longtime collaborator, John Philip Shenale, to accommodate the string quartet.

Amos was accompanied by the string quartet on every leg of the tour except in South Africa, where she performed solo with her Bösendorfer piano.

== Songs ==
Amos is known for changing her setlist every time she performs. The following songs were performed more than 40% of the time.

- Baker Baker
- Big Wheel
- Carry
- Cloud on my Tongue
- Cruel
- Fearlessness
- Girl Disappearing
- Leather
- Mr. Zebra
- Nautical Twilight
- Precious Things
- Shattering Sea
- Siren
- Snow Cherries from France
- Spark
- Star Whisperer
- Suede
- Way Down
- Winter
- Your Ghost

== Tour dates ==
Date	City	Country	Venue
Europe
September 28, 2011	Helsinki	Finland	Ice Hall
September 30, 2011	Saint Petersburg	Russia	Oktyabrsky Hall
October 2, 2011	Moscow	Russia	Crocus Hall
October 4, 2011	Luxembourg	Luxembourg	Den Atelier
October 5, 2011	Paris	France	Le Grand Rex
October 7, 2011	Milan	Italy	Teatro Arcimboldi
October 8, 2011	Rome	Italy	Auditorium Parco della Musica
October 10, 2011	Hamburg	Germany	Laieszhalle
October 11, 2011	Berlin	Germany	Tempodrom
October 13, 2011	Warsaw	Poland	Sala Kongresowa
October 15, 2011	Eindhoven	Netherlands	Muziekgebouw
October 17, 2011	Amsterdam	Netherlands	Carre
October 18, 2011	Amsterdam	Netherlands	Carre
October 20, 2011	Oslo	Norway	Sentrum Scene
October 21, 2011	Copenhagen	Denmark	Royal Danish Theatre
October 22, 2011	Copenhagen	Denmark	Royal Danish Theatre
October 24, 2011	Lucerne	Switzerland	Lucerne Culture and Congress Centre
October 25, 2011	Vienna	Austria	Stadthalle F
October 26, 2011	Frankfurt	Germany	Alte Oper
October 28, 2011	Antwerp	Belgium	QEH
October 29, 2011	Brussels	Belgium	Bozar
October 31, 2011	Essen	Germany	Philharmonie
November 2, 2011	London	United Kingdom	Royal Albert Hall
November 3, 2011	London	United Kingdom	Hammersmith Apollo
November 4, 2011	Manchester	United Kingdom	Manchester Apollo
November 6, 2011	Glasgow	United Kingdom	Glasgow Royal Concert Hall
November 8, 2011	Belfast	United Kingdom	Waterfront Hall
November 9, 2011	Dublin	Ireland	Grand Canal Theatre
Africa
November 12, 2011	Johannesburg	South Africa	Theatre of Marcelius at Emperors Casino
November 13, 2011	Johannesburg	South Africa	Theatre of Marcelius at Emperors Casino
November 14, 2011	Johannesburg	South Africa	Theatre of Marcelius at Emperors Casino
November 17, 2011	Cape Town	South Africa	Grand Arena and Grand West Casino
North America
December 1, 2011	Philadelphia	United States	Academy of Music
December 2, 2011	New York City	United States	Beacon Theatre
December 3, 2011	New York City	United States	Beacon Theatre
December 5, 2011	Washington, D.C.	United States	Constitution Hall
December 6, 2011	Boston	United States	Orpheum Theatre
December 8, 2011	Toronto	Canada	Massey Hall
December 10, 2011	Chicago	United States	Chicago Theatre
December 13, 2011	Vancouver	Canada	Orpheum
December 14, 2011	Seattle	United States	Paramount Theatre
December 16, 2011	Oakland	United States	Paramount Theatre
December 17, 2011	Los Angeles	United States	Orpheum Theatre
December 18, 2011	Los Angeles	United States	Orpheum Theatre
December 21, 2011	Austin	United States	Bass Concert Hall
December 22, 2011	Grand Prairie	United States	Verizon Theatre at Grand Prairie
