= Carry (song) =

Single by Tori Amos

from the album Night of Hunters
- Released: August 18, 2011
- Studio: Martian Engineering (Cornwall)
- Genre: Classical; baroque pop
- Length: 4:07
- Label: Deutsche Grammophon
- Songwriters: Tori Amos; Claude Debussy
- Producer: Tori Amos

Tori Amos singles chronology
"A Silent Night with You" (2009)	"Carry" (2011)	"Flavor" (2012)

"Carry" is a song by American singer-songwriter and pianist Tori Amos, released as the main promotional single from her twelfth solo studio album Night of Hunters (2011). The track was released on August 18, 2011, as a digital download only with an accompanying music video.

== Background and release ==
Like the rest of the tracks on the album, Carry builds upon a classical composition, with musical variations, arrangement and added lyrics by Amos. Carry is a variation on La fille aux cheveux de lin (Girl with the Flaxen Hair), originally released in 1909 by French composer Claude Debussy. In addition to piano by Amos, the track features instrumentation by the Apollon Musagète Quartet.

Carry is the last track of the album and the final piece in the song cycle and narrative story that spans the entire album. After the tumultuous shattering of the protagonist's relationship to her lover early in the album, and the emotional processing and understanding that subsequently follows, Carry describes the protagonist having despite it all found an eternal place in her heart for her lover. The lyrics are about coming to terms with the fact that people can disappear from your life without being forgotten, and that they can still remain a part of you. In a track-by-track introduction of "Night of Hunters" for Amazon.com, Amos writes: "With the dawn comes Carry, and the sentiment: you will not ever be forgotten by me, in the procession of the mighty stars your name is sung and tattooed now on my heart, here I will carry, carry, carry you forever.".

The song was performed live regularly during the artist's Night of Hunters tour in support of the album.

An instrumental version of "Carry" appears on Sin Palabras, the instrumental companion album to Night of Hunters, released in December 2011.

== Critical reception ==
Rolling Stone found "Carry" to be one of the prettiest moments on the album, describing it as a lush closer. Slant Magazine complimented it as a captivating melody, but felt the album as a whole was without pop structure or notable hooks. Writing for All Music Guide, Thom Jurek describes "Carry" as the most powerful and accessible track on the album. Glide Magazine's reviewer felt "Carry" along with its preceding track "Seven Sisters" acted as an ideal couple to end the album.

== Music video ==
The accompanying music video features Amos playing the piano and singing the track in the studio, edited together with scenes from the Irish landscape and the Georgian style house owned by Amos, where the photoshoot for the album art took place. Amos' daughter acts the part of "Anabelle" from the album's narrative in the video clip.
