= Midwinter Graces =

Studio album by Tori Amos
- Released: November 10, 2009
- Studios: Martian Engineering (Cornwall); Conway Studios (Los Angeles); The Nut Ranch (Los Angeles); Chicago Recording Company (Chicago); Phase One Studios (Toronto); Avatar (New York City)
- Genres: Christmas; traditional
- Length: 48:03
- Label: Universal Republic
- Producer: Tori Amos

Tori Amos chronology
Abnormally Attracted to Sin (2009)	Midwinter Graces (2009)	Night of Hunters (2011)

Singles from Midwinter Graces
- 1. "A Silent Night with You" Released: November 29, 2009

Midwinter Graces is the eleventh solo studio album by American singer-songwriter and pianist Tori Amos, released on November 10, 2009 (November 16, 2009, in the UK), through Universal Republic Records. It is the first seasonal album by Amos and is also notable for marking her return to a more classical, stripped-down, baroque sound with various synths, string instruments, the harpsichord, and Amos's own signature Bösendorfer piano at center stage, once more. The album, like previous releases from Amos, is available in a single-form CD or a deluxe edition, which includes three bonus tracks, a twenty-page photo book, and a DVD containing an interview with Amos. The standard edition was not released in the US or Canada. Midwinter Graces became Amos's then-lowest-charting album on the Billboard 200, peaking at number 66.

An original song by Amos, "A Silent Night with You", was released as the promotional single from the album.

== Development ==
Midwinter Graces began as a suggestion by Doug Morris, chairman and chief executive officer of Universal Music Group, who, according to Amos, encouraged her to tackle and complete the project at a moment's notice, in March 2009. After a summer of writing original material and rearranging established hymns and carols for the album, Amos, while still on the road for her 2009 world tour, began recording. Portions of the album were recorded in her husband's recording studio, Martian Studios, in Cornwall, England, while other sessions were held in Studio City and Los Angeles, New York, Chicago and Toronto. During interviews for the album, Amos spoke at length about making this album for both her father, a Methodist Priest, and for Morris, a liberal man of the Jewish faith.

In early November 2009, Amos gave an interview for Pride Source Magazine, in which she disclosed the primary reasoning behind the album.

"[My father] wanted me to do this," said Amos. "I think the fact that I didn’t write 'She’s a Hussy, Merry Christmas' will make everybody really happy. There’s no mention of Satan or dancing with Satan or anything like that. There’s nothing disrespectful on this record; it’s really beautiful."

"Doug looked at me," continued Amos, "it was March – and he said, 'I'm 70, and I want you to do this. You can do this. You’ve been doing this your whole life.' He inspired me. He’s been able to have these conversations with me since the mid ’80s. He pushed me to start writing Little Earthquakes, so he’s been in my life for so long. (Before July of last year), I hadn’t seen him for 14 years. And even though he’s 70, he’s as sharp as he ever was.

"He challenges me, and he couldn’t accept that I couldn’t achieve it. He said, 'You can do this. If you don’t have something to do, you’ll lose your mind.' So I thought about it, and one thing led to another."

In another interview, Amos explained, "[He] said to me in March when I was visiting him in New York, 'I’ve always wanted to know what you would do with a seasonal album. You’re a minister’s daughter so you grew up with this stuff, but you’re also a feminist.' A lot of this music was written when things were really puritanical and women didn’t have any rights, and so there isn’t a lot of embracing of the feminine except with the Virgin Mary, if that makes any sense. Because he and I were talking about music that goes back, a more pagan style of music where there seems to be a place where goddesses were honoured if you go back into antiquity. And he said, 'I’d really like to see you have a perspective on the carols and write some of your own.'"

"I left him and ended up in Florida and it was 100 degrees and Tash came in running in a bikini saying, 'Are you playing Christmas music, mummy?' And I said, 'Yeah, I think I am.' (Laughs)."

== Composition ==
Following the personal struggles with sin, power, faith and "being a wife, mother and woman" Amos explored on Abnormally Attracted to Sin, she found comfort in immersing herself in the old carols and hymns she sang and played during her youth. When asked how she followed an album "about damnation" with an album embracing spirituality Amos replied, "“You think, let’s go to church.”

"I’ve been writing it since I was a little girl," exclaimed Amos during an interview with The Advocate in promotion for the album. "[A] little girl, in church."

Amos, who has struggled with and fought her religious upbringing, both through her music and with her own mosaic set of beliefs, approached the prospect of doing a holiday album, or seasonal record, from the perspective of someone who was struggling to gain a deep and enriching spirituality not necessarily tied to a set of dogmatic beliefs: "I felt that as a minister’s daughter I could open up the circle to all those people who might not want to embrace Christianity, but have a spiritual feeling about the time.

"The record contains a lot of story and beauty, and it does transcend some of the shame that gets attached to some of the music even during the season," noted Amos. There's a side to the record when you listen to it that talks about what is the gold – what really is that? It's valuing whom you have in your life, the relationships you've built. It's not just about success – or it just isn't all your material possessions anymore – it's how you live your life, and that's all included in the music."

When asked why she chose to have her daughter, Natashya Hawley, sing on the song "Holly, Ivy and Rose", Amos took the opportunity to draw attention to her whole family's involvement in the piece:

"It just sort of happened," said Amos. "It started with Kels, Tash’s older cousin. Kels has been singing for years and is in performing arts school in Boston. She has a really big instrument. I thought we had to do something together that works. ‘Candle: Coventry Carol’ in itself is an ancient song, and I thought it would lend itself to that. And then Tash was thinking she wanted to do a bawdy song. And I said no. She wanted to do a bawdy British schoolboy read on a carol. And I said, “no, we’re not doing that, we’re not shocking grandma”. I came up with this idea of ‘Holly, Ivy and Rose’ and she really took to that idea. So in the end both of them are there. And I thought that was important because we all sing together." "There’s a whole family representation going on. And in the artwork, my nephew [Casey Dobyns] is a model in New York, and he plays the angel [on the cover of the album]. So the next generation is represented."

Amos' brother died in a car crash in 2005 and it is widely believed that the song that closes the album, Our New Year, deals with her own thoughts and feelings behind his tragic demise. However, when asked, Amos chose to keep the meaning of the song private, "I think at this time of year you think of people that might not be in your life anymore or who’ve left the planet. I get really nostalgic at Christmas, and memories of other times with other people who you might not have heard from in a long time can cross your mind." Finally, when asked pointedly if she had anyone in mind when writing the song, Amos responded definitively, "I did. But, we’ll leave it there." "People get nostalgic and you have to acknowledge that there are people that aren’t with you anymore, so there’s a song that does that. But," Amos insisted, "for the most part, for a Tori record, it’s pretty upbeat."

In regards to the album as a whole, Amos surmised, "I would say that it embraces the rebirth of light, but light means knowledge, light means consciousness. Everybody can attain that and have that in their life. Consider the idea that it’s inner God. It’s in every child that’s born; every child carries this ability within them. And I like that sentiment."

== Recording ==
In an interview in which she discussed the process behind recording the album, Amos disclosed,"We ended up doing basic tracks at Martian which is my husband’s studio in England, and then we started realising that we needed to record on days off all through the States, and we would record almost every day we got off in America, and then came back to mix it in England at Martian."

Due to Doug Morris' request being on such short notice, Amos found herself writing and recording the album on the road while on her 2009 world tour in support of Abnormally Attracted to Sin. Recording sessions were held in Los Angeles, Chicago, New York City, Toronto and in Cornwall, England at various points during 2009.

== Critical reception ==
Professional ratings
Aggregate scores
Source	Rating
Metacritic	(68/100)
Review scores
Source	Rating
AllMusic	2.5/5 stars
American Songwriter	3.5/5 stars
Billboard	(78/100)
Drowned in Sound	(6/10)
The Guardian	4/5 stars
The Independent	3/5 stars
Paste	(4.9/10)
PopMatters	(8/10)
The Rolling Stone Album Guide	3/5 stars
Slant Magazine	3/5 stars

Upon its release, reviews of the album were mostly positive and enthusiastic. On Metacritic, it was given a score of 68 out of 100 based on 10 "generally favorable reviews".

Independent music magazine, American Songwriter, called the album "Dark, piano-driven [and] spectacularly unique", crediting Amos with offering up something "gothic, inspired and winter-y." Billboard noted, "Amos reaches deep into the world of carols for ancient and less obvious fare that she subsequently recasts on string-laden songs," praising the album, finally, as "a typically provocative-in the best possible way-entry in the yuletide canon." The New York Times noted, "Gorgeously recorded and impeccably produced, [it's an album that] dwells in hymn-like serenity and diaphonous wonder." The London Evening Standard also considered the album a success, stating, "[Amos] fills [this album] with harpsichord and subdued strings as well as her crisp, icicle voice. There's an ancient sound to [many of the] tracks...and again, a deliberate avoidance of anything cheery enough to be played over the Asda tannoy." The Guardian, which gave the album 4/5 stars, noted enthusiastically, "Centre stage is given to her voice and the simple arrangements," adding, "Amos sounds so tranquil she could almost be floating, but the stateliness of the orchestral backing keeps the songs grounded. You'd never know this was recorded [during one] summer, so vividly does it evoke crunching snow and frosty nights." They summarized, "Accordingly, it's her most touching album in years." BBC Music exclaimed, "'Midwinter Graces' has an appealing skip in its step... When it slows, it can do so with an understated elegance that Amos has only sporadically summoned during the 00s." The Digital Fix called it "perhaps the most straightforward album, both musically and lyrically that [Amos] has ever produced." England based internet-magazine P. Viktor rated the album 4.5/5, calling it a "brilliant addition to the Tori canon, and a shining example of what a Christmas album should be," stamping it, finally, as "one of her most accomplished albums this decade," while Mother Jones said, "Amos has crafted a collection of covers and originals filled with whimsy and melancholy—the musical equivalent of spiked eggnog."

London newspaper The Independent gave the album two differing reviews. The first review was mixed, giving the album 3/5 stars and criticizing some of the song arrangements and production choices, though it did say, "The pluses outweigh the minuses [on this album], with further highlights coming courtesy of Amos' own 'Winter's Carol' and 'A Silent Night with You' – the former blessed with stately, hypnotic grace, while the latter's undulating melody evokes the warmth of a reverie triggered by seasonal radio fare." The second review of the album, although unstarred, was positive, stating, "[This album] flits back and forth between traditional yuletide tunes and Amos' own compositions, but the former are riddled with her own lyrical addenda, and the latter are heavy with references to carols, invariably twisted to secular – and subtly sexual – ends." "Stylistically," they continued, "with all the tootling flutes, arpeggiating harpsichords and sonorous electric violins, it's reminiscent of folk-rock bands circa the cusp of the 1970s." They also noted, "Even when she is singing a "straight" rendition of a Christmas chestnut, there's always an underlying feeling that every syllable is laden with intrigue and layered with hidden meaning." They concluded, "For a festive album with a difference, it's time to vote Tori [Amos]."

Drowned in Sound observed, "Fans of her earlier work will delight in the more direct, piano-driven melodies and orchestral arrangements that dominate the album, as well as the welcomed return of the long neglected harpsichord on several tracks," A mixed review by The Skinny called the album "moderately successful," awarding it 3/5 stars. Slant Magazine gave the album 3/5 stars, citing Winter's Carol, a song from and preview of Amos' upcoming musical adaptation of George MacDonald's The Light Princess, as the standout track: "The song's strong melody and arrangement are reminiscent of something from Under the Pink, bolstering a pagan yarn about the passing of the seasons." On the album as a whole, Slant concluded, "it's an ironic, pleasantly competent oddity." Consequence of Sound gave it four stars out of five and called it "a pleasant and often gorgeous effort," and Internet magazine, PopMatters, cited the album as "Amos’ best work in years." AllMusic was not impressed, however, giving it two-and-a-half stars out of five and stating, "Thanks to some familiar melodies, it can sometimes seem seasonally appropriate, but it always seems purely Tori, who has somehow managed to deliver an easy listening version of all her signatures in one tidy, not so-Christmasy, package."

The Huffington Post concluded, "Tori Amos’ beautiful vocals and recordings range between visions of an orphan looking at delicacies through frosty restaurant windows to dark stories from a worldly soul who's seen too many mirthless seasons pass. In either case, whether she's turning around standard carols or adding her own titles to the secular Christmas catalog, Amos is so at home in this wintry environment, she may want to consider permanently keeping Spring at bay." Washington Square News gave the album three-and-a-half out of five stars and said that it "won't be your favorite Tori Amos album, but it will help rekindle the warmth of the excessively commercialized (and Barry Manilow-ified) holiday genre."

== Promotion ==
Promotion for the album began early. On November 6, 2009, the weekend before its release, Amos offered up an exclusive full-preview/download of the album via E! Online and IMEEM. On November 18, 2009, a video for the song "Pink and Glitter", with Amos performing solo, premiered on yahoo.com, while a video for the song "A Silent Night With You", also performed solo by Amos, premiered on Spinner.com on November 30, 2009. On December 9, 2009, Amos also offered up two more official videos of solo-performances - "Star of Wonder" and "Jeanette, Isabella" - via social-networking sites such as Facebook, Twitter and MySpace. On December 18, 2009, ABC's Nightline did a short piece on Amos, focusing on her musical inspirations and her unique relationship with the piano.

=== Singles ===
"A Silent Night With You" was the first officially released single for Midwinter Graces. The single was released for digital download in the UK on November 29, 2009. Along with the aforementioned track, the single-release contains acoustic versions of the songs "Pink and Glitter" and "Jeanette, Isabella". To date, it has not been released in the US.

=== Live performances ===
During promotion for the album Amos made a string of public and private appearances. She was usually accompanied by her Bösendorfer and a keyboard, switching to various settings throughout her performances.

Amos started off with a special one-off show at The Jazz Cafe in London on December 2, 2009, in promotion for the album. Entry to the concert required a wristband handed out at the HMV store at 150 Oxford Street starting at 8:00 AM on the day of the performance. An estimated 400 people waited outside in the rain for a chance to see Amos perform. The free show was solo-based, with Amos accompanied only by her piano. On December 8, 2009, Amos held a private invitation-only set in which a hundred or so music insiders and personnel gathered at Spin Magazine's office headquarters as part of their SPINHouse Live series. On December 9, 2009 WNYC, due to popular demand, moved their show to the Jerome L. Greene Performance Space and dedicated its one-hour show to a special concert by Amos, followed by an interview. On December 11, 2009, at 3:00pm Amos gave a free live concert via Livestream, followed by an interview, both of which were watched by over 4,000 visitors.

== Track listing ==
No.	Title	Writer(s)	Length
1.	"What Child, Nowell" (arrangement, additional lyrics and music: Tori Amos)	traditional	3:45
2.	"Star of Wonder" (arrangement, additional lyrics and music: Amos)	John Henry Hopkins Jr.	3:50
3.	"A Silent Night with You"	Tori Amos	3:22
4.	"Candle: Coventry Carol" (arrangement, additional lyrics and music: Amos)	traditional	3:18
5.	"Holly, Ivy, and Rose" (arrangement, additional lyrics and music: Amos)	traditional	4:44
6.	"Harps of Gold" (arrangement, additional lyrics and music: Amos)	traditional	3:10
7.	"Snow Angel"	Amos	3:43
8.	"Jeanette, Isabella" (arrangement, additional lyrics and music: Amos)	traditional	4:28
9.	"Pink and Glitter"	Amos	4:57
10.	"Emmanuel" (arrangement, additional lyrics and music: Amos)	traditional	3:00
11.	"Winter's Carol"	Amos	5:19
12.	"Our New Year"	Amos	4:13

=== Additional tracks ===
Deluxe edition bonus tracks (US and Canada standard tracks):

- "Comfort and Joy" (traditional — arrangement, additional lyrics and music: Amos) — 3:56
- "Stille Nacht, Heilige Nacht (Silent Night, Holy Night)" — (lyrics: Josef Mohr, music: Franz Xaver Gruber, English lyrics: John Freeman Young) — 3:39

iTunes bonus track:

- "Good King Wenceslas" (traditional — arrangement, additional lyrics and music: Amos) — 5:33

== Personnel ==
- Tori Amos – vocals, Bösendorfer piano, Harpsichord, Wurlitzer
- John Philip Shenale – Strings, Synths, Samplers, string & brass conduction and arrangements
- Matt Chamberlain - drums, percussion, bells
- Jon Evans – bass
- Mac Aladdin – guitars
- Kelsey Dobyns – guest vocals, "Candle: Coventry Carol"
- Natashya Hawley – answer vocal, "Holly, Ivy and Rose"
- Bruce Burchmore - lute
- Tony Kadleck, Bob Millikan, Brian Pareshi - flugelhorn
- Tom Malone, Keith O'Quinn, Dan Levine - trombone
- Lon Price - orchestration
- Tony Kadleck, Bob Millikan, Brian Pareshi, James De la Garza - trumpet
- Ronnie Cuber - baritone saxophone
- Lawrence Feldman - alto saxophone
- Bob Malach, Lawrence Feldman - clarinet
- Sam Bortka, Bob Malach - tenor saxophone
- Sam Bortka - bass clarinet
- Dave Taylor - bass trombone
- Bob Peterson, Norm Hughes, Charles Everett, Benedikt Brydern, John Wittenberg, Halm Shtrum, Francine Nadeau Walsh, Calabria McChesney-Foti, Phillip Vaiman, Razdan Kuyumjian, Mark Cargill, Margaret Wooten, Armen Garabedian, Gil Romero, Shari Zippert - violin
- Jimbo Ross, Evan Wilson, Dan Neufeld, Denise Buffum, Harry Shirinian - viola
- Nancy Ross, Armen Ksajikian, Timothy Loo, Giovanna Moraga Clayton, Ernie Ehrhardt - cello

== Charts ==
=== Album ===
Chart (2009)	Peak position
Australian Albums (ARIA)	152
Dutch Albums (Album Top 100)	99
French Albums (SNEP)	133
Polish Albums (ZPAV)	40
UK Albums (Official Charts)	97
US Billboard 200	66
US Top Alternative Albums (Billboard)	16
US Top Holiday Albums (Billboard)	9
US Top Rock Albums (Billboard)	23
