= A Silent Night with You =

Single by Tori Amos

from the album Midwinter Graces
- Released: November 29, 2009
- Studio: Martian Engineering (Cornwall); Conway Studios (Los Angeles); The Nut Ranch (Los Angeles); Chicago Recording Company (Chicago); Phase One Studios (Toronto); Avatar (New York City)
- Genre: Christmas
- Length: 3:23
- Label: Universal Republic
- Songwriter: Tori Amos
- Producer: Tori Amos

Tori Amos singles chronology
"Maybe California" (2009)	"A Silent Night with You" (2009)	"Carry" (2011)

"A Silent Night with You" is a song written and performed by American singer-songwriter and pianist Tori Amos. It was released November 29, 2009 as the only promotional single from the seasonal album Midwinter Graces (2009).

== Background and release ==
While most of the songs on recorded for Midwinter Graces are interpretations of traditional carols, Amos penned five original songs for the album, one of them being A Silent Night with You. Amos is expressly against organised religion, and did not want the album to be associated explicitly with Christianity's celebration of holidays, so she wanted her own songs to evoke positive associations with Christmas that were more inclusive, such as feelings of nostalgia, love and family:

It is a love song. Doug really encouraged me to do this. He talked to me a lot about feelings he had when he would listen to the carols, and he said that sometimes they wouldn't bring him to a religious place; they'd bring him to a nostalgic place. We talked about this particular idea, and I went away thinking, My mother is going to lose her mind if I do anything to 'Silent Night!'

== Promotion and live performances ==
The official video clip accompanying the single release features Amos playing the piano and singing the track in the recording studio.

The song was performed live on UK television programme The Alan Titchmarsh Show broadcast Dec 3, 2009, as well as in intimate concert settings for SPIN magazine and Last.fm that were broadcast online. A Silent Night with You was featured in concerts during the Midwinter Graces Tour of December 2009.

== Critical reception ==
A Silent Night with You was met with mixed reviews, but the five original compositions on the album as a whole were met with enthusiasm by critics, who felt that they were a welcome addition to the traditional material, and that the quality and production made for a seamless experience. Drowned In Sound's review stated that "once you get past the cringe-worthy opening ... the song itself is a romantic account of second chances at the holidays". The review from PopMatters deemed A Silent Night with You to be the weaker of the five original compositions, but went on to say that the others "more than make up for it", calling special attention to the track Winter's Carol as a masterpiece, a sentiment Consequence of Sound's reviewer agreed upon. Paste Magazine's review called the track a seasonal cliché.

== Tracklist ==
Digital Single

1. "A Silent Night With You" - 3:22
2. "Pink and Glitter" (Acoustic Version) - 3:11
3. "Jeanette, Isabella" (Acoustic Version) - 4:28
