= Bouncing Off Clouds =

Single by Tori Amos

from the album American Doll Posse
- Released: 2007
- Recorded: 2006
- Studio: Martian Engineering (Cornwall)
- Genre: Art pop; alternative rock
- Length: 4:08
- Label: Epic; Sony BMG
- Songwriter: Tori Amos

Tori Amos singles chronology
"Big Wheel" (2007)	"Bouncing Off Clouds" (2007)	"Welcome to England" (2009)

"Bouncing Off Clouds" is a song written and recorded by American singer-songwriter and pianist Tori Amos. It was the first European and second American single from her ninth studio album American Doll Posse (2007). The song was released in the U.S. to Triple A Radio in early August.

== Music video ==
The music video for "Bouncing off Clouds" is a variation of the music video for "Big Wheel", a slide show of photographs taken by Blaise Reutersward for Amos' album, American Doll Posse. This music video uses slightly different images of Amos, interspersed with images of clouds. The music video was released to Yahoo! music on October 3, 2007. As with "Big Wheel", a contest was held for a fan-made video of "Bouncing Off Clouds" with Epic/Sony providing green screen footage of Amos playing on a Rhodes piano and a Wurlitzer.

== Charts ==
The sole ranking for "Bouncing off Clouds" was placing at #50 on the Italian Top 50 Downloads chart. It had no physical release.

== Performances ==
In support of this second US single from American Doll Posse, Amos performed "Bouncing Off Clouds" on a variety of television programs:

- The Graham Norton Show on May 10, 2007
- The Tonight Show with Jay Leno on October 1, 2007
- The Late Late Show with Craig Ferguson on October 11, 2007
