= Abnormally Attracted to Sin =

Studio album by Tori Amos
- Released: May 19, 2009
- Recorded: July 2007 – May 2008
- Studios: Martian Engineering Studios (Cornwall, UK); Avast! Recording Co. (Seattle, WA)
- Length: 72:18
- Label: Universal Republic
- Producer: Tori Amos

Tori Amos chronology
American Doll Posse (2007)	Abnormally Attracted to Sin (2009)	Midwinter Graces (2009)

Singles from Abnormally Attracted to Sin
- 1. "Welcome to England" Released: April 14, 2009; 2. "Maybe California" Released: May 18, 2009; 3. "500 Miles" Released: 2009

Abnormally Attracted to Sin is the tenth solo studio album by American singer-songwriter and pianist Tori Amos, released 19 May 2009, in standard and limited CD/DVD edition. The album debuted on Billboard 200 at no. 9, giving Amos her seventh Top 10 album in the U.S.

The album's lead single is "Welcome to England". The song was a moderate hit on Triple A radio in the US. The release was supported by the Sinful Attraction Tour in the US, Europe, and Australia.

== Background ==
Amos lifted Abnormally Attracted to Sin's title from a line spoken by one of the main characters in the 1955 film Guys and Dolls.

The album itself was written and conceived in two stages: first during Amos' 2007 world tour, while promoting American Doll Posse, followed by a creative spurt of writing and composing the following year, in July 2008, when Amos reconnected with her former music industry mentor Doug Morris while she was visiting California to promote her graphic-novel anthology, Comic Book Tattoo.

During her stay in California that year, Amos revisited some of the old homes and haunts she had frequented as a twenty-something struggling artist in LA during the late '80s. She made a point of visiting the old church behind her old apartment. In past interviews, Amos has stated how songs such as "Crucify" and "Precious Things" were written while living behind this church, listening to endless sermons and worship-songs for hours at a time, alone, hurt and depressed following her failure as a musician (1988's Y Kant Tori Read), and her role as a victim and survivor of physical and sexual assault. It was a threshold moment for Amos, providing her a time of respite, solace and a bit of reflection regarding her life and past. Memories of this time and these places, coupled with some of her own reflections and conclusions as a wife, mother and maturing woman, led to a spontaneous creative spell for the new album. This provided a catalyst for "a second batch of songs", as Amos puts it, which would end up fleshing out the rest of the album.

"Things were black and that’s before a whole second part of the record got written and developed when I came back to the states for Comic-Con [in July 2008]. And I was on my home ground where I wrote Little Earthquakes and there was a metamorphosis that happened. I passed by that little house where I wrote it and I thought, I took on a lot back then — I can take this on. I can fight. But I had lost how to fight. I had to change everything to fight — all kinds of people had to change. The one thing that kept me going was the love that Tash and Mark had for me. I just saw that I was becoming totally devastated and beaten."

=== Themes and content ===
While Amos's four previous albums were highly influenced by conceptual frameworks and overarching narratives, Abnormally Attracted to Sin marks a return to a more personal album. The songs serve as loosely veiled confessions, stark and, at times, exuberant disclosures through which Amos explores her own experiences, and how she has both defined and been defined by them throughout her life and career. Amos stated about the record: "it is not a concept album. It is a red-headed woman singing songs."

During an interview with Out magazine, Amos used the song "Maybe California", a track from the album in which a mother ruminates on leaving her husband and child(ren) "better off" as she contemplates suicide, to explain just how personal writing and composing both the song and the record as a whole were for her: "I wouldn't have written this record if I hadn't been pushed – for all kinds of reasons. I don't want to go into all of it but "Maybe California" doesn't come from nowhere. You're not able to write that by having a drink with somebody who's had the experience and you haven't. You have to be pushed to that place." She speaks of the mother figure in the song: "there's nothing that she can give to stop this terrible emotional cancer that has taken over her family – her life – everything around her." Adding credence to the notion that the song is deeply autobiographical, Amos chose to highlight the despair older, more mature women, such as herself, face: "I began to realize how serious this quiet, tragic problem was and that it's not okay to talk about it, whereas teen suicide – it gets discussed and it's almost something where there are [forums] for it. But mothers contemplating this – my God – they're just going to put you in a nuthouse."

On another album track, "Ophelia", Amos addresses her own moments of insecurity and self-loathing as a "mature woman". She observed:

"The self-harming mind tries to gain [the] control that [it] feels has been taken from [it]. It's this very strange paradox where, by doing the wounding on yourself, you're in the power position. Although, the idea that you've become your own abuser – it's not necessarily being grasped. And so, you can step into that "Ophelia" state of mind – however old you are – where you start that downward spiral and you're not on the 'front-foot' anymore in life, you're on the 'back foot', and there's a victimization-energy around you."

During an interview, Amos commented: "I guess the girl that released Little Earthquakes was not a mother, and she was in her 20s, and there were a lot of things that she really did discover. She found her voice...and then nine records later, the woman who is putting out Abnormally Attracted to Sin knows what she did with her voice."

== Art direction ==
Cover art of "Welcome to England"

For the album's artwork and promotional images, Amos enlisted fashion photographer Karen Collins. "I love the way [Collins] shoots women," Amos stated about the photographer's work. "It's not vulgar or demeaning, but I find it just sexy. They look empowered to me, and I like her style." The setting for the album's artwork is a cream-colored hotel room, with various photos of Amos depicting different ideas of sensuality through images such as voyeurism and sadomasochism, both of which tie into the ideas of power explored throughout the album. Collins' images was used for the cover artwork on both single releases from the album.

=== Visualettes/The Road Chronicles ===
16 video clips, one for each song except "Mary Jane", was released as "The Road Chronicles" on a bonus DVD for the deluxe edition of the album. From the very beginning, Abnormally Attracted to Sin was intended to be an audio-visual project including visuals linked to the music. Filming these so-called visualettes became a significant catalyst for the development of the music of the album itself.

Screenshot from "Maybe California" visualette, an example of the symbolism and grainy 8mm, indie footage style found in all the video clips.

Christian Lamb, who has worked with artists such as Madonna, Incubus, and Ozzy Osbourne, was initially hired by Amos to shoot footage of her 2007 American Doll Posse World Tour for an intended concert DVD release. However, after disagreements with her label over creative issues and financing the release, Amos left Epic Records, and the concert DVD was never released.

As a result of this sudden bit of inspiration when working on her next album, Amos requested that Lamb shoot additional footage for this project instead, forming the idea for a complementary "road chronicle" that would accompany Abnormally Attracted to Sin. Amos also stated that viewing the 2007 footage directly inspired her to write some of the songs. That the original footage dates back to the previous album period can observed in the video clips as Amos' fashion, styling and appearance is the same as the artwork and promotion during the release and tour supporting American Doll Posse. The footage was shot in HD and Super 8. Seemingly inspired more by fashion, scenery and art, rather than by silent films or typical music videos, The Road Chronicles is composed of 16 vignettes in which Amos can be seen in dream-sequences infused with myriad metaphors, symbols, images, locations and haute couture fashion-pieces, meant to evoke and open up the themes and experiences tackled on each of the corresponding album songs. Commenting on not pursuing a more traditional form of music videos, Amos stated: "I began to really think about the idea of a story being told through the visuals and yet the song itself giving us all the information – that’s our dialogue. I didn’t want any lip-syncing." About the look of the visualettes, Amos has said: "We wanted to do pretty much 8mm and more of a late ‘60’s, indie kind of feeling and that began the visualette world."

The visuals are described by Lamb as "an intimate portrait of Tori travelling through arresting cityscapes such as London, New Orleans, LA and San Francisco". While the production value of the footage is notably low-budget, and the clips do not pass themselves off as contemporary music videos, the style and consistency of the clips was complimented as a nice addition and deciphering of Amos's typically convoluted and high concept lyrics. As one commenter observed: "They work because they are a jumping off point to understanding the songs better and allow us to see how Tori works creatively, something the audience is rarely allowed to glimpse."

The tracklist for The Road Chronicles visualette DVD is very different from the LP release. Amos stated: "I think the visualettes connect [the songs] as well. The order is different though, which was very intentional. The order of the visual side of things is different than if you're just putting the sonic thing on headphones and taking a walk. I felt like you had to experience it very, very differently."

== Critical reception ==
Professional ratings
Aggregate scores
Source	Rating
Metacritic	62/100
Review scores
Source	Rating
AllMusic	3/5 stars
The A.V. Club	B−
Drowned in Sound	(7/10)
Entertainment Weekly	B
Los Angeles Times	3/4 stars
musicOMH	3/5 stars
PopMatters	(8/10)
Rolling Stone	2.5/5 stars
Slant Magazine	3.5/5 stars
Spin	(5/10)

The album received modest to generally positive reviews from critics, with most negative comments aimed at the album's extensive running time rather than its musical content, a criticism that has been laid on Amos for her previous albums since 2000 as well. According to Metacritic, it has an aggregate score of 62/100, based on 17 reviews, indicating "generally favourable reviews".

"[Amos's 10th] studio release finds her in full command of her expanded arsenal, creating an overall sound that's as psychedelic as it is classic," wrote Billboard, adding, "the sounds coupled with [the] lyrical content [found on the album] — metaphors rendered through literary heroines, religious imagery, exotic food, cities as characters, triple entendres — make for a singular tapestry that, as the artist matures, requires less and less prior knowledge of her catalog to enjoy." Slant Magazine gave the album a mixed, yet mostly positive, review, exclaiming unapologetically, "It's a genuine relief that [this album] lacks the cumbersome structural conceit of Scarlet's Walk or the dissociative identity disorder of American Doll Posse. Rather than suffocating her songs under a pretentious broad construct, here Amos allows them to stand on their own merits and, in turn, demonstrates the superior craft upon which she first made her name." Slug Magazine called it "one of 2009’s finest albums," while the Los Angeles Times praised the album's "canny balance between Victorian-inspired decadence, mythical pathos and arch camp." Entertainment Weekly magazine noted, "Sometimes her brains get a little too big for her Bible. But when she's banging on her piano over layers of lush electronics, she's got the rapture part down."

Reviews in Rolling Stone, Mojo and Q were less favorable, although, while criticizing it as a "long haul", the latter did admit that the album contained "some of the best [songs] Amos has written." Spin noted, "Amos writes no less penetratingly than she did on her first album about the way women navigate the intersection between sex and power," while PopMatters lauded the album for its experimental sound, calling it an "exploration of the journey from that dark, quiet beginning to that beautifully indulgent conclusion," praising the album's "twists and turns along the way." musicOMH added that the album "turns out to be a collection of tracks that simply doesn't work as a whole because it can't properly be listened to in one go. Pity, for somewhere in amongst it all Tori proves that she's still capable of producing a storming album."

The music website, Drowned in Sound, concluded, "Occasionally vague, sometimes incohesive and a little self-indulgent it may be, but ultimately Abnormally Attracted to Sin is an abnormally attractive piece of work, and another fine example of the shining talent that is Tori Amos."

== Commercial performance ==
Abnormally Attracted to Sin sold 41,000 copies during its first week of release in the US, and peaked at no. 9 on the Billboard 200. This was a weaker performance than her previous album American Doll Posse, but still continues Amos's album success in the Top 10.

== Track listing ==
All tracks are written by Tori Amos.

No.	Title	Length
1.	"Give"	4:13
2.	"Welcome to England"	4:08
3.	"Strong Black Vine"	3:27
4.	"Flavor"	4:05
5.	"Not Dying Today"	4:01
6.	"Maybe California"	4:24
7.	"Curtain Call"	4:52
8.	"Fire to Your Plain"	3:01
9.	"Police Me"	3:53
10.	"That Guy"	4:02
11.	"Abnormally Attracted to Sin"	5:33
12.	"500 Miles"	4:05
13.	"Mary Jane"	2:42
14.	"Starling"	4:02
15.	"Fast Horse"	3:52
16.	"Ophelia"	4:42
17.	"Lady in Blue"	7:10
Total length:		72:18

Limited edition UK and Australasian bonus track (and iTunes standard)
No.	Title	Length
18.	"Oscar's Theme"	3:39
Total length:		75:55

== Personnel ==
- Tori Amos – vocals, Bösendorfer piano, Rhodes, organ, synths, producer
- Matt Chamberlain – drums, percussion
- Jon Evans – bass
- Mac Aladdin – electric guitar, acoustic guitar, 12-string, mandolin
- John Philip Shenale – string arrangements, synths, B3 Organ

Technical

- Mark Hawley – mixer
- Marcel van Limbeek – mixer
- Christian Lamb – videography
- Karen Collins – photography

== Production and release history ==
Amos finished writing and composing Abnormally Attracted to Sin during the spring and summer of 2008. Recording commenced with Amos accompanied by long-time collaborators Matt Chamberlain, Jon Evans, Mark Hawley/"Mac Aladdin" (Amos's husband), and John Philip Shenale, at Amos's husband's studio, Martian Studios, in Cornwall, with final mixing and mastering extending into the initial months of 2009.

Musically, the album production features a dark and intricately "detailed sonic landscape", as Amos put it. Of the trip-hop and electronic influences on the album, the artist stated: "I want to make audio mescaline", referring to the hallucinogenic, LSD-like drug. PopMatters reflected that the album's sound "is like the electronic experiments of From the Choirgirl Hotel crossed with film noir". On developing the sound of one of the songs and of the album in general, Amos declared, "It became much more of a technology experiment [with] the piano being there but in this strange world."

"I've been working with the new keyboards and ultimately developing one sound. So, in a way, this record reminded me of the experience that I had [working on] From the Choirgirl Hotel, where technology and keyboards and the Bösendorfer were working together in an advanced way.

"I think that that there are a lot of different styles on the record," continued Amos in another interview. "I've been composing now for over 40 years, and each song in a way takes you to this different place. Maybe some of them are dark, rich caves. Hopefully there's a nice piano player sitting there taking your request in the cave."

Abnormally Attracted to Sin was recorded in Amos's home studio, Martian Engineering Studios in Cornwall, with longtime collaborators Matt Chamberlain on drums, Jon Evans on bass, Mac Aladdin on guitar, and John Philip Shenale arranging the strings. Amos served as record producer. The album is the first for Amos with Universal Republic, a "joint venture" that developed unexpectedly soon after her departure from her previous label.

Like all of Amos's post-Atlantic releases, Abnormally Attracted to Sin is offered in both standard and limited edition versions, the latter including a DVD containing "The Road Chronicles" visualettes for each album track, albeit in a different running order. The album was also issued as a double vinyl LP album.

Release history:

Country	Date	Label	Format	Catalogue number(s)
Australia	15 May 2009	Universal Republic	CD	060252703435
Belgium	15 May 2009	Universal Republic	CD	060252703435
Netherlands	15 May 2009	Universal Republic	CD	060252703435
Poland	15 May 2009	Universal Music Group	CD	
United Kingdom	18 May 2009	Island	CD	2704664
Canada	19 May 2009	Republic	CD	
United States	19 May 2009	Universal Republic	CD	001287302 (standard)
United States	19 May 2009	Universal Republic	CD	001290110 (deluxe)
United States	19 May 2009	Universal Republic	LP	001290601

== Charts ==
Chart (2009)	Peak position
Australian Albums (ARIA)	28
Austrian Albums (Ö3 Austria)	12
Belgian Albums (Ultratop Flanders)	23
Belgian Albums (Ultratop Wallonia)	49
Canadian Albums (Billboard)	15
Danish Albums (Hitlisten)	40
Dutch Albums (Album Top 100)	22
Finnish Albums (Suomen virallinen lista)	20
French Albums (SNEP)	61
German Albums (Offizielle Top 100)	16
Irish Albums (IRMA)	31
Italian Albums (FIMI)	30
New Zealand Albums (RMNZ)	39
Norwegian Albums (VG-lista)	37
Polish Albums (ZPAV)	7
Scottish Albums (Official Charts)	35
Spanish Albums (PROMUSICAE)	84
Swiss Albums (Schweizer Hitparade)	14
Taiwan Albums	16
UK Albums (OCC)	20
US Billboard 200	9
US Top Digital Albums (Billboard)	6
US Top Internet Albums (Billboard)	4

Additionally, the album debuted at #2 on the following two genre-specific Billboard charts: the Top Modern Rock/Alternative Albums chart and the Top Rock Albums chart.

== Certifications ==
Region	Certification	Certified units/sales
Poland (ZPAV)	Gold	10,000^{*}
^{*} Sales figures based on certification alone.

=== Singles chart ===
"Welcome To England" served as the lead single from Abnormally Attracted to Sin. The single was released for digital download on April 14, 2009, in the US, and on May 25, 2009 in the UK, a week after the release of the album. Like most of Amos's singles released this decade, "Welcome to England" was released only as a digital single. The single entered the Billboard Triple A chart in May 2009, and in June ascended into the chart's top 10, making it Amos's fifth single to reach the Triple A top 10.

"Maybe California" reached #1 in Portugal.

The album track "Flavor" was later re-worked as both an orchestral and an electronic remix for Amos' Gold Dust retrospective compilation, reaching the no. 1 spot on Billboard's Dance/Club Play Songs.

Title	Chart	Position
"Welcome to England" (2009)	US AAA	10
"Welcome to England " (2009)	Belgian Singles Chart “Tip” (Wallonia)	26
"Maybe California" (2009)	Portugal	1
