= Night of Hunters =

Studio album by Tori Amos
- Released: September 16, 2011
- Studios: Martian Engineering; Cornwall
- Genre: Classical crossover
- Length: 71:38
- Label: Deutsche Grammophon
- Producer: Tori Amos

Tori Amos chronology
| Midwinter Graces (2009) | Night of Hunters (2011) | Gold Dust (2012) |

Singles from Night of Hunters
- 1. "Carry" Released: August 18, 2011

Night of Hunters is the twelfth solo studio album by American singer-songwriter and pianist Tori Amos, released on September 20, 2011, in the United States through Deutsche Grammophon. It is a concept album that Amos has described as "a 21st century song cycle inspired by classical music themes spanning over 400 years." She pays tribute to classical composers such as Alkan, Bach, Chopin, Debussy, Granados, Satie and Schubert, taking inspiration from their original compositions to create new, independent songs. Regarding the album's concept, she has described it as the exploration of "the hunter and the hunted and how both exist within us" through the story of "a woman who finds herself in the dying embers of a relationship."

Night of Hunters is Amos's first studio album recorded using only acoustic instruments, relying solely on her vocals and classically trained piano skills, along with a variety of accompanying string and woodwind instruments, to create its classical sound. Additionally, to record this album Amos broke a nearly 15-year-long collaboration with her studio and touring bandmates, choosing to work with a variety of new musicians, including the Berlin Philharmonic's principal clarinetist, Andreas Ottensamer, and the award-winning string quartet, Apollon Musagète, while enlisting her daughter, Natashya Hawley, and niece, Kelsey Dobyns, as guest vocalists. Night of Hunters also marks the twentieth anniversary of her long-time collaboration with John Philip Shenale, who has contributed arrangements to most of her albums, beginning with her solo debut, Little Earthquakes (1992).

The album is Amos's first release on a classical music label. Like her previous releases, it is available in both standard and deluxe CD formats, digital format, as well as limited edition vinyl. Amos also released an entirely instrumental version of the album entitled Night of Hunters – Sin Palabras (without words) available only to download.

The main promotional single released from the album is "Carry", a variation on La fille aux cheveux de lin by Debussy.

== Background ==
In an interview with Out magazine, Amos revealed that work on Night of Hunters began after Deutsche Grammophon approached her to write a 21st Century song cycle under the condition that it be centered around classical music themes. She also suggested that her work on the upcoming musical, The Light Princess, sharpened her narrative skills for the project. In the official electronic press kit released for the album, Amos spoke of listening to and being inspired by the music of Stravinsky and of how she was "taken by the idea of an octet" for this project, stating that she found it appealing that other instruments could serve as the voices of various characters throughout the story while not overpowering the piano as the central instrument of the piece. In an interview with Marcel Anders, journalist for The Interview People, Amos credited Dr. Alexander Buhr, executive producer for Deutsche Grammophon, with providing her with a wealth of knowledge on the great composers of the last four-hundred years and with recordings of some of their best compositions. Amos pointed out that it was Dr. Buhr who initially approached and offered her the opportunity to headline this project. During this interview, Amos also cited Schubert's Winterreise as "a mentor in many ways" while composing Night of Hunters.

=== Concept ===
According to Amos, the concept centers on a woman who is left alone on the eve of her relationship's demise in an old Georgian house near the River Bandon, located on the outskirts of Kinsale, County Cork in Ireland. As dusk turns to night, the woman is confronted by Anabelle, a shapeshifting "childlike creature" who "emerges from nature", played by Amos's daughter. The mythical creature, representing "duality", as well as the ancient forces of "the hunter" and "the hunted", coaxes the woman to follow her into the night, transporting them both approximately three-thousand years into the past to witness a previous incarnation of the woman's relationship. It was a time of great chaos and violence in ancient Ireland as a war of beliefs raged on, and the woman and her lover fought side-by-side as bards, using the ancient tree alphabet as their only weapon. Once the war was lost, however, the woman and her lover crossed the Atlantic on his sailboat, abandoning her world, the New World, in favor of his world, the Old World. It was during this time that forces, both within and outside of their control, drew the couple apart. After their sojourn into the past, Anabelle inducts the woman in an ancient peyote ritual which is meant to further expand her consciousness through both hallucinogenic and meditative means. During the ritual, Anabelle helps the woman realize how she abandoned her own fire and inner-strength when she left her world in favor of her lover's. The woman also sees how both she and her former lover interchangeably misused the ancient forces of "the hunter" and "the hunted" against one another throughout the course of their union. This self-destructive dynamic, in turn, also plagued the present-day incarnation of their relationship. Once the ritual and woman's self-examination are complete, Anabelle reminds her of the perils and benefits found in using and misusing the ancient energies of "the hunter" and "the hunted". The creature also advises the woman that there are "forces" at work that must be dealt with and that she must leave her so that she alone may face the Fire Muse, played by Amos's niece Kelsey Dobyns. In meeting the mythical goddess, the woman is allowed to recapture the fire and inner-strength she had abandoned, both in her past and present incarnations, and is taught about the "light" and "dark" forces of the world at large. The Fire Muse reminds the woman that more than just her own mortal pains and desires are of concern and, together, as the fiery goddess calls upon the woman to see the world from a higher perspective, they weave a spell to protect the light of the world from the forces of darkness. The woman ends her journey at dawn, renewed and grateful for her place in the world and for all of the people that have inhabited her life, including her former lover.

In an interview with Instinct, Amos spoke of relating "to both the male and female in this story," while during her interview with The Interview People, she stressed that the themes tackled on the record are dualistic in nature for her, whereby they are somewhat telling of both "intimate conflict[s]" within her own marriage along with the "greater problem[s]" of the world today. Amos revealed that the album is "a compilation of experiences Mark and I have had for over sixteen years. We're still together, knock on wood. And we work together and we play together. And we're trying to be parents together. And it's difficult sometimes when you have to be the grown-ups." "I understand the man and the woman [on this album] very well," she continued. "It's not a play by play of me and husband, but there is a bit of us in there." In regards to the universal aspect of the record, Amos concluded, "As the story progresses, the protagonist begins to see that there [are] greater problem[s] in the world. And they have to deal with their world. Not just another person in their world, but their relationship to the world itself."

== Promotion and touring ==
Promotion for Night of Hunters kicked off on August 18, 2011, when Amos and Deutsche Grammophon debuted a video for the song Carry along with an audio stream of the song "Shattering Sea" on Facebook. On September 12, 2011, NPR featured the first authorized full audio stream of Night of Hunters, accompanied by a review of the album by music journalist Ann Powers, co-author of Amos's biography, Piece by Piece (2005).

To promote the album, Amos embarked on the Night of Hunters Tour supported by the Apollon Musagète, making it her first tour with a string quartet. Amos launched the tour in Europe on September 28, 2011, in Helsinki, finishing in Dublin on November 9, 2011. This was followed by a tour in North America that began on November 29, 2011, in Atlanta, Georgia, and ended on December 22, 2011, in Grand Prairie, Texas. Prior to the tour, Amos has revealed that John Philip Shenale was rearranging various songs from her catalogue to accommodate the string quartet.

== Critical reception ==
Professional ratings
Aggregate scores
| Source | Rating |
|---|---|
| Metacritic | (70/100) |
Review scores
| Source | Rating |
| AllMusic | 4/5 stars |
| The A.V. Club | B+ |
| Daily Express | 5/5 stars |
| Drowned in Sound | (7/10) |
| Entertainment Weekly | B |
| Los Angeles Times | 3/4 stars |
| Metromix | 4/5 stars |
| MusicOMH | 4/5 stars |
| Uncut | 4/5 stars |
| Spin | (7/10) |

Although some critics took issue with the extensive concept of Night of Hunters, reviews were mostly positive, with many also citing it as Amos's strongest release in nearly a decade. Additionally, a number of critics took note of the vocal contributions by Amos's daughter and of Amos's own skills as a pianist, citing both as major highlights of the record.

AllMusic gave the album a glowing review, stating, "[Amos] employs her finest vocal and piano-playing skills [here]," resulting in an album of "sophistication, elegance, and poetry" that "contains the power, dynamics and splendor of her very best material," while the Associated Press observed, "There are clear classical, even operatic influences, from sweeping strings and reedy woodwinds, [to] Amos's gripping piano" on this "beautifully composed album which highlights Amos's[s] classical training and fierce intensity as a musician and songwriter." The A.V. Club praised Amos for "[getting] back to the basics", calling the record a "sprawling [...] thesis on the enduring beauty of classical music" and "[Amos's] most enjoyable album in years," while Blurt magazine insisted, "There's so much more to Amos's latest music," stating, "The one-time child prodigy is a celebrated virtuoso for a reason. Doubters need only listen to her ever-masterful piano playing intertwined with orchestral movements [here] and her as-distinctive-as-Stevie Nicks' voice to confirm that", declaring the album "a rare musical vision you'd be foolish to pass up." The Daily Express also hailed the album, calling it "complex, accomplished and [Amos's] finest work in a decade." Glide Magazine was taken by the "power, immediacy and splendor" of the album, stating, "Amos has delivered her most absorbing, forceful and captivating record since 2002’s Scarlet's Walk," declaring it, finally, "a venerable tour de force." Drowned in Sound gave a positive review, praising Amos for the sparse production of the album and noting "as a whole [it] showcases the best of [Amos's] piano work." The Guardian criticized the album for its "overthought concept" and focus on "resolution rather than build-up", but praised Amos for her craftmanship as a musician, stating, "[The fact] that Amos can weave her own songs so deftly into variations on classical pieces is testament to her talent, and the piano, string and woodwind arrangements frequently sound as lovely as her earlier orchestral experiments." The Harvard Crimson praised Amos for "composing an album that effectively uses chamber music as a tool relevant to the times," declaring it "the work of an accomplished musical architect" and describing it as "an inimitable blend of vocal arrangements, orchestral scoring, and a spiritual homage to nature" with "moments of impeccable instrumentation" that "play more like the score of a dramatic film than the work of a singer-songwriter," all of it culminating in "an intricate, swirling triumph."

Holy Moly! called it "a sumptuous sounding work, with the piano to the fore," also noting "While this is a new approach for [Amos] (abandoning her usual musicians in favour of [a] clarinettist and string quartet), she sounds completely at home with what is essentially an intellectual take on the Broadway musical." The Los Angeles Times called the album "a beautiful kaleidoscope of remembering and letting go", comparing it to the works of Kate Bush and stating, "[Amos's] voice is a crystal bell with only the ivory [of her piano] guiding her" as we witness "an artist maturing and growing with her music, [and] making sense of her past in a wholly original, intelligent way." The London Evening Standard praised Amos for handling the classical proceedings "triumphantly", stating, "From the reassuringly bleak opening to the breathy piano and scratched strings of the [album's centerpiece], these graceful, imaginative, all-acoustic songs threaten to give classical crossover a good name. Amos, meanwhile, deserves a reappraisal." Metromix called the record "one of the most gorgeous and challenging albums of Amos's career," pointing out her "stunning acoustic piano skills," and labeling it, finally, "a master class in Amos's artistic power." The Digital Fix gave the album a positive review, distinguishing it for its "rich sonic tapestry, with strings and woodwinds swelling underneath [Amos's] always virtuoso piano performances," and NPR declared it "the album [Amos] was destined, by early apprenticeship and spiritual affinity, to record." The Observer, in turn, criticized the album for its "florid excesses", stating, "it plays out like an intermittently absorbing, if overly demanding, night at the theatre [...] but Amos's[s] voice possesses enough conviction and personality to breathe life into what could have been an orchestral folly," while Ology also cited it as "[Amos's] best album in more than a decade," calling it "an overpoweringly lush rumination on her classical influences that’s both sprawling and intimate, powerful and delicate."

PopMatters criticized the album for its "elliptical" narrative but noted, "Nevertheless, the album does contain its share of gripping drama, undeniable poignancy, and iridescent beauty" and "it is hard not to applaud, even marvel at its intense focus, meticulous craftsmanship, and bravura performances, not to mention its sheer artistic ambition." The Salt Lake Tribune commended Amos for "[skipping] the gimmicks that have marred her later works and [returning] to the raw emotion and power of her earlier songs," while The Scotsman hailed the album, also comparing it to the works of Kate Bush and calling it "piano rich", "intensely personal", "bonkers, mesmeric and charged with a pristine eroticism," declaring, finally, "This is a real record by a real artist, a rare thing in this age of disposable culture." The Scottish magazine, The Skinny, praised the album for its "focus on delicate symphonies and baroque drama," comparing it to "the stark and candid nature of Under the Pink," and citing it as both "a breathtaking return" and Amos's "strongest album in over a decade," while Slant criticized the album for its uniform sound and tempo, but noted, "The more direct songs are genuinely beautiful and transcend the trappings of the album's rigid construct," also stating, "every [string and] woodwind instrument rings with the purest of tones in support of Amos's typically stunning piano work" resulting in a "beautiful, smart record." Spin praised Amos for creating "a wildly imaginative ride full of orchestral fireworks and fairy-tale melodrama," while Uncut Magazine declared, "If the aim was to out-bonkers Joanna Newsom and Kate Bush while creating a compelling album, Amos has more than succeeded." The UK-based women in music compendium, Wears The Trousers Magazine, continued with the praise, also crediting the album with being Amos's "most cohesive and consistent" in nearly a decade, lauding her for "[building] on the work of past masters to develop an utterly distinctive vision of her own," resulting in "a rich, immersive record of beauty, danger and grace."

The album was awarded the Echo Klassik-ohne-Grenzen-Preis (Classics without Borders Prize) in 2012.

== Track listing ==
All lyrics are written by Tori Amos.

Night of Hunters
| No. | Title | Music | Variation on: | Length |
|---|---|---|---|---|
| 1. | "Shattering Sea" | Charles-Valentin Alkan | Song of the Madwoman on the Sea-Shore, Prelude Op. 31, No. 8 | 5:38 |
| 2. | "SnowBlind" (featuring Natashya Hawley) | Enrique Granados | Añoranza from 6 Pieces on Spanish Folksongs | 3:14 |
| 3. | "Battle of Trees" | Erik Satie | Gnossienne no. 1 | 8:42 |
| 4. | "Fearlessness" | Granados | Orientale from 12 Spanish Dances | 6:31 |
| 5. | "Cactus Practice" (featuring Natashya Hawley) | Frédéric Chopin | Nocturne Op. 9, No. 1 | 4:27 |
| 6. | "Star Whisperer" | Franz Schubert | Andantino from Piano Sonata in A major, D 959 | 9:53 |
| 7. | "Job's Coffin" (featuring Natashya Hawley) | Amos | Inspired by Nautical Twilight | 3:32 |
| 8. | "Nautical Twilight" | Felix Mendelssohn | Venetian Boat Song from Songs Without Words, Op. 30 | 3:16 |
| 9. | "Your Ghost" | Robert Schumann | Theme and Variations in E-flat major, WoO 24 from Ghost Variations | 5:38 |
| 10. | "Edge of the Moon" | Johann Sebastian Bach | Siciliana from Flute Sonata, BWV 1031 | 4:51 |
| 11. | "The Chase" (featuring Natashya Hawley) | Modest Mussorgsky | The Old Castle from Pictures at an Exhibition | 3:02 |
| 12. | "Night of Hunters" (featuring Kelsey Dobyns) | Domenico Scarlatti; Gregorian chant | Sonata in F minor, K. 466, Salve Regina | 5:32 |
| 13. | "Seven Sisters" | Amos | Inspired by Prelude in C minor | 2:44 |
| 14. | "Carry" | Claude Debussy | The Girl with the Flaxen Hair from Préludes I | 4:07 |
| Total length: | | | | 71:38 |

Bonus content: The deluxe edition includes a bonus DVD containing a documentary on the album and music videos for "Carry" and "Nautical Twilight".

== Personnel ==
Musicians

- Tori Amos – vocals, Bösendorfer (piano)
- John Philip Shenale – arrangements

String quartet (Apollon Musagète)

- Piotr Skweres – cello
- Piotr Szumieł – viola
- Paweł Zalejski – violin
- Bartosz Zachłod – violin

Woodwind instruments

- Laura Lucas – flute
- Andreas Ottensamer – clarinet
- Nigel Shore – oboe, English horn
- Peter Whelan – bassoon
- Luke Whitehead – contrabassoon

Additional vocalists

- Kelsey Dobyns – The Fire Muse guest vocals on "Night of Hunters"
- Natashya Hawley – Annabelle guest vocals on "SnowBlind", "Cactus Practice", "Job's Coffin" and "The Chase"

Production

- Tori Amos – record producer
- Mark Hawley – mixer
- Marcel van Limbeek – mixer
- Jon Astley – mastering
- Dr. Alexander Buhr – executive producer
- Victor de Mello – photography

== Charts ==
The chart below lists the album's peak positions on various music charts around the world. While the album's debut at No. 24 on the Billboard 200 did not chart particularly well compared to some of her earlier albums, many of which debuted in the top 10 in the US, Amos did make Billboard history by being the first female artist to have an album place in the top 10 of the Classical, Alternative, and Rock charts simultaneously.

| Chart (2011) | Peak position |
|---|---|
| Australian Albums (ARIA) | 42 |
| Austrian Albums (Ö3 Austria) | 22 |
| Belgian Albums (Ultratop Flanders) | 25 |
| Belgian Albums (Ultratop Wallonia) | 36 |
| Danish Albums (Hitlisten) | 29 |
| Dutch Albums Chart | 34 |
| Finnish Albums (Suomen virallinen lista) | 8 |
| French Albums (SNEP) | 70 |
| German Albums (Offizielle Top 100) | 12 |
| Italian Albums (FIMI) | 47 |
| Norwegian Albums (VG-lista) | 31 |
| Polish Albums (ZPAV) | 13 |
| Scottish Albums (Official Charts) | 29 |
| Spanish Albums (Promusicae) | 86 |
| Swiss Albums (Schweizer Hitparade) | 33 |
| UK Albums (OCC) | 27 |
| US Billboard 200 | 24 |
| US Top Alternative Albums (Billboard) | 5 |
| US Top Classical Albums (Billboard) | 1 |
| US Top Rock Albums (Billboard) | 7 |
| US Indie Store Album Sales (Billboard) | 8 |

== Certifications ==
| Region | Certification | Certified units/sales |
|---|---|---|
| Poland (ZPAV) | Gold | 15,000^{‡} |
^{‡} Sales+streaming figures based on certification alone.
