= Big Wheel (song) =

Single by Tori Amos

from the album American Doll Posse
- B-side: "Drive All Night"
- Released: April 10, 2007
- Recorded: 2006
- Studio: Martian Engineering (Cornwall)
- Genre: Alternative rock
- Length: 3:16
- Label: Epic; Sony-BMG
- Songwriter: Tori Amos

Tori Amos singles chronology
| "Sweet the Sting" (2005) | "Big Wheel" (2007) | "Bouncing Off Clouds" (2007) |

"Big Wheel" is a song written and recorded by American singer-songwriter and pianist Tori Amos. It was chosen as the first single from her album American Doll Posse. However, multiple radio stations rejected "Big Wheel" because the acronym MILF is repeated in the bridge of the song. An edited version was played on some radio stations that eliminated the MILF acronym, changing it to "M-I-M-I".

== Music video ==
The music video for "Big Wheel", based on the concept of still photographs coming to life, is a slide show of pictures from Blaise Reutersward's photo shoot for Amos's album. The music video, for which Amos is credited as the director, premiered on Yahoo! Music on April 18, 2007.

== Tracklist ==
Digital Single

1. "Big Wheel" - 3:18
2. "Drive All Night" - 4:06

== Charts ==
For the week ending April 6, 2007, the single was the most-added to Triple A radio stations across the United States. The song peaked at No.6 on the Triple A charts, No.115 on Hot Digital Songs, and No.12 on the Billboard Bubbling Under Hot 100 Singles chart.

| Chart (2007) | Position |
|---|---|
| US Bubbling Under Hot 100 (Billboard) | 12 |
| US Adult Alternative Airplay (Billboard) | 6 |
