= American Doll Posse =

Studio album by Tori Amos
- Released: May 1, 2007
- Recorded: June 2006 – February 2007
- Studios: Martian Engineering, Cornwall, UK
- Length: 78:42
- Label: Epic
- Producer: Tori Amos

Tori Amos chronology
A Piano: The Collection (2006)	American Doll Posse (2007)	Abnormally Attracted to Sin (2009)

Back cover
- Final two of the five "dolls" in the posse

Singles from American Doll Posse
- 1. "Big Wheel" Released: April 10, 2007; 2. "Bouncing off Clouds" Released: April 10, 2007; 3. "Almost Rosey" Released: November 1, 2007

American Doll Posse is the ninth studio album by American singer-songwriter and pianist Tori Amos, released in 2007 by Epic Records. A concept album, American Doll Posse sees Amos assuming the identity of five different female personalities inspired by Greek mythology in order to narrate stories of life in modern America. Themes include opposition to the Iraq War, recording industry misogyny, disillusionment, sexuality, personal loss, and female empowerment in general. Musically, the record is more rock-oriented than other studio works by Amos, notably featuring more guitar and drums than previous albums The Beekeeper (2005) and Scarlet's Walk (2002).

The album peaked at number five on the Billboard 200, marking Amos' sixth top-ten album. The lead single in the US, "Big Wheel", was a hit on Triple-A radio. In Europe, "Bouncing Off Clouds" was released as the lead single.

== Background and release ==
Following songwriting during and after Amos' 2005 solo tour, recording sessions for American Doll Posse began in June 2006, with longtime collaborators Matt Chamberlain on percussion, Jon Evans on bass, and Mac Aladdin on guitars, in Amos' Martian Engineering home studio in Cornwall, where all of Amos' albums since From the Choirgirl Hotel (1998) were recorded. As the album's musical direction was more focused around a full band than previous Amos recordings, all principal musicians were present in the studio from the very beginning of the recording sessions. After a month of tracking work, Amos continued editing and recording for the remainder of the year, at the same time working on the promotion of her career-spanning box set, A Piano: The Collection. Mixing work was completed by February 2007, and the album title was announced through a press release on February 20.

Prior to its release, Amos revealed that the nature of the album's lyrics are political and confrontational:

The main message of my new album is: the political is personal. This as opposed to the feminist statement from years ago that the personal is political. I know it has been said that it goes both ways, but we have to turn it around. We have to think like that. I'm now taking on subjects that I could not have been able to take on in my twenties. With Little Earthquakes I took on more personal things. But if you are going to be an American woman in 2007, with a real view on what is going on, you need to be brave, and you need to know that some people won't want to look at it.

While early press indicated that Amos may bring back both the harpsichord (last used on Boys for Pele) and the Wurlitzer (used on Strange Little Girls and Scarlet's Walk), only the latter appeared on the album, on the track "Dark Side of the Sun". Before the album's release, Amos made several comments about bringing a "warrior woman" out, as well as stating that the record would be a very different chapter from what had come before.

As with Amos' previous releases under the Epic Records label, American Doll Posse was offered in a limited deluxe edition as well as the standard edition. The deluxe edition includes two videos (a behind-the-scenes of her photo shoot and a slideshow-style bonus track titled "My Posse Can Do"), an expanded booklet, and five postcards, one of each "doll". In addition, bonus tracks were available on the editions sold by certain retailers, such as iTunes and Target.

American Doll Posse serves as Amos's third and final album under her contract with Epic Records. After completing promotion of the record, Amos announced that she would henceforth be operating independently of major record labels, expressing increased frustration in the industry putting boundaries and limitations on artists.

=== The Doll Posse ===
Artwork in the album booklet depicts Amos as all five of the titular "dolls". From left: Clyde, Isabel, Tori, Santa, Pip.

The album title, American Doll Posse, refers to five different female characters developed by Amos, each inspired by deities in Greek mythology, interpreted and used on the record to represent different aspects of Amos' own personality, including the aforementioned "warrior woman".

What I'm trying to tell other women is they have their own version of the compartmentalised feminine which may have been repressed in each one of them. For many years I have been an image; that isn’t necessarily who I am completely. I have made certain choices and that doesn’t mean that those choices are the whole story. I think these women are showing me that I have not explored honest extensions of the self who are now as real as the redhead.

As part of the marketing campaign for the album, a series of blogs written from the point of view of each "doll" could be found online, with Amos inviting fans to "hunt" for the blogs, as their locations were originally secret. The blogs were updated intermittently during the American Doll Posse World Tour through the end of 2007, after which they were discontinued.

Amos offered detailed descriptions on the five personalities, explaining the attributes that each represented, which Greek goddess was the inspiration, and what songs on the album each "doll" provided the narrative for. In concerts during her 2007 world tour, Amos would start the set list performing as one of the characters and would include that particular character's rendition of songs from her back catalogue. The fifth "doll" is Amos herself, narrating the most personal songs on the album and featuring as the main character in each concert.

Doll	Mythological inspiration	Attributes	Album songs	Covers in concert
Isabel (HisTORIcal)	Greek goddess of the hunt Artemis	A photographer, a chronicler, an observer. The most outwardly political in the posse.	"Yo George", "Mr. Bad Man", "Devils and Gods", "Almost Rosey", "Dark Side of the Sun",	"Sweet Dreams", "In the Springtime of His Voodoo", "Tombigbee", "Virginia", "Scarlet's Walk", "Sweet Sangria", "Mountain", The Exorcist theme "Part One", the Velvet Underground song "New Age", which Amos had previously covered under her own name in 2001
Clyde (CliTORIdes)	Greek goddess of the underworld Persephone	"Wears her emotional wounds on her sleeve, but remains idealistic. She is looking at the effects of not being a whole person. She is trying to figure out what she believes in and she is dealing with having been disappointed in her life".	"Bouncing Off Clouds", "Girl Disappearing", "Roosterspur Bridge", "Beauty of Speed", "Miracle" (with Tori)	"Little Amsterdam", "Black-Dove (January)", "Juarez", "Little Earthquakes", "Upside Down", "Mary", and the Lloyd Cole track "Rattlesnakes", which Amos had previously covered under her own name in 2001
Pip (ExpiraTORIal)	Greek goddess of war, wisdom, and strategy Athena	Confrontational "warrior woman", unafraid and aggressive.	"Teenage Hustling", "Fat Slut", "Body and Soul" (with Santa), "Velvet Revolution", "Smokey Joe"	"Bliss", "Cruel", "The Waitress", "Blood Roses", "Me and a Gun," "Professional Widow", "Suede", the Neil Young song "Heart of Gold," which Amos had previously covered in 2001
Santa (SanaTORIum)	Greek goddess Aphrodite	Sensual and passionate, seductive and embracing sexuality	"You Can Bring Your Dog", "Secret Spell", "Body and Soul" (with Pip), "Programmable Soda", "Dragon", "My Posse Can Do", "Drive All Night"	"Cruel", "God", "Sugar", "She's Your Cocaine", "Hoochie Woman", "Raspberry Swirl", "Bug A Martini", "Sweet the Sting", the Brazilian traditional song "Carnival"
Tori (TerraTORIes)	Greek goddess Demeter and god Dionysus	Stylised version of the artist herself. Promotional images depict Tori holding sage and with a bible in one hand and the word "shame" scrawled across the other.	"Big Wheel", "Digital Ghost", "Father's Son", "Code Red", "Posse Bonus", "Miracle" (with Clyde)	—

=== Bonus songs ===
"Posse Bonus", "Smokey Joe", and "Dragon" were originally to be featured as bonus tracks on the limited-edition version only but were added to the full track listing of both versions prior to the album's release.

"My Posse Can Do" is included on the DVD accompanying limited-edition versions of the album, while the tracks "Miracle" and "Drive All Night" were available exclusively through the iTunes Store and Borders, respectively, as digital downloads for a limited time. "Drive All Night" was also released as a digital B-side of "Big Wheel".

In 2010, part of a demo disc for 1998's From the Choirgirl Hotel leaked online, including a previously unreleased track entitled "Violet's Eyes". The chorus of "Miracle" comes directly from this never-completed demo. Elements of the song are also used in "Almost Rosey"; "Violet" is also mentioned in the lyrics of the song. During her virtual book tour on May 7, 2020, Tori revealed that additional songs written for the album, some of which were demoed, include: "Christmas in July [Santa]", "Inhale", "The Lucy" (part of which became the bridge in "Edge of the Moon" on 2011's Night of Hunters), "Femme Fatale", "Shoot That Arrow" (which dated back fifteen years then), "Shame About Kate" (previously known as "Inside Job"), "Crystalline" (which later became "Reindeer King" on 2017's Native Invader), "Hi Ho Silver", and "Mermaids".

== Promotion ==
The first live performance of the new material took place on April 10, 2007, for Radio Eins in Berlin, Germany, where Amos played six songs solo on piano—"Silent All These Years" and "Leather" from 1992's Little Earthquakes as well as four songs from the new album—"Velvet Revolution", "Father's Son", "Beauty of Speed", and "Almost Rosey".

The American Doll Posse World Tour, with Amos backed by a full band as opposed to her previous solo piano tour, commenced on May 28, 2007, in Rome, Italy. The European leg of the tour ended with a show in Ra'anana, Israel, on July 21, 2007. The Australian leg, which commenced on September 10 and lasted the rest of the month, was followed by the North American segment, which began on October 9. The tour ended on December 16, 2007, in Los Angeles, California. Amos, using a Bosendorfer piano, Yamaha synth, and Hammond organ, was backed by Matt Chamberlain (drums), Jon Evans (bass), and Dan Phelps (guitar).

Amos brought the "Doll Posse" concept from the album into the concerts as well, channeling the different personalities in live performances. As hinted before the tour began, one of the four alter egos, complete in her own unique wardrobe, opened each show, performing as many as up to seven songs, followed by a musical interlude and a costume change, with Amos taking over as herself and playing without gimmick for the remaining two-thirds of the show. Three exceptions were the San Diego and Los Angeles shows, where two dolls opened, and the Anaheim performance, where two dolls opened and one of them returned for the encore.

== Singles ==
"Big Wheel" was released as the first radio single in the United States, prior to the album's release. Multiple radio stations refused to give the song any airtime because the acronym "MILF" is repeated in the bridge. Despite this hiccup, the single was successful on Triple A radio. The record label re-issued the single with the "MILF" bridge replaced with Amos singing "MI-MI". "Big Wheel" charted at no. 12 on Billboard's Bubbling Under Hot 100 chart as well as reaching no. 12 on the Triple-A charts.

"Bouncing off Clouds" served as the first single in Europe and as the second single in the United States. "Almost Rosey" was issued as the third single as an internet-only release through MySpace. Neither of the two singles charted in the US. Following the trend set by her previous releases with Epic, all three singles released from American Doll Posse were promo-only, and no commercial singles were produced.

For the first time in Amos's career, no official music videos were produced by the artist for any of the singles from the album, although a clip featuring still images from the record's promotional shoot was issued as an accompaniment to "Big Wheel". For "Bouncing Off Clouds", clips of Amos singing and playing the piano against a neutral background were released and encouraged fans to edit their own music videos as a competition. The winning contribution featured animation but did not qualify for release, as the contestant was not American. The single release of "Almost Rosey" was accompanied by studio footage of Amos performing the song live on piano.

== Critical reception ==
Professional ratings
Aggregate scores
Source	Rating
Metacritic	69/100
Review scores
Source	Rating
AllMusic	4/5 stars
Blender	4/5 stars
Entertainment Weekly	C+
The Guardian	4/5 stars
Los Angeles Times	3.5/4 stars
musicOMH	4/5 stars
PopMatters	8/10 stars
Rolling Stone	3/5 stars
Slant Magazine	3.5/5 stars
Spin	9/10

American Doll Posse was met with generally favourable reviews, with most criticism being directed not at the musical content but towards the extensive concept as a potential turn-off for casual listeners. Another point of critique for some reviewers was the album's 23 tracks and long running time. Most reviewers were pleased that both the lyrics and the musical production was noticeably more edgy and confrontational than the preceding The Beekeeper (2005). Most reviewers found American Doll Posse to contain some of Amos' best material since the mid-1990s.

Rolling Stone's reviewer gave the album 3 of 5 stars and found that it was best without the extensive concept surrounding much of the music, stating that "there's way too much conceptual malarkey surrounding the songs, but if you can ignore her fake posse, you'll find this is Amos' best album in many years". Sputnikmusic gave a 3-star review, calling it a "return to form – sort of". The review from PopMatters was very positive, with an 8/10 score, praising Amos' assured vocals as "top form" and finding "moments of jaw-dropping virtuosity", but also criticising the length of the album and lack of editing. Spin gave a glowing review, giving the record a 9/10 score, calling it "arguably the singer/pianist's greatest, and undeniably sexiest, album" and "instantly memorable". Entertainment Weekly gave the album a C+ review, calling it a "conceptual wreck" but appreciating the freshness of Amos engaging in glam rock territory. Mojo, Billboard, and Now Magazine likewise advised Amos to avoid heavy-handed concepts, giving the album average reviews. Slant Magazine gave American Doll Posse 3.5 of 5 stars, criticising the structure as alienating but finding the music itself to be Amos' best since From the Choirgirl Hotel (1998), especially favoring the lead single "Big Wheel" as a straightforward and lively song. MusicOMH gave a 4-star review, calling it a coherent and intriguing record, albeit a bit inaccessible conceptually. The Boston Globe was very positive, hailing the record as "a lush sprawl of an album that works with or without the feminist playbook".

== Commercial performance ==
Upon its US release, the album entered the Billboard 200 at no. 5, selling 54.000 copies, making it Amos' sixth album to debut in the US Top 10 Albums chart, a feat shared by very few other female artists Twenty-five percent of the first week's sales were digital, an increasing figure as per general market trends. In 2008, the album was reported to have sold 152,000 copies in the US, according to Nielsen SoundScan.

The album's debut at no. 5 is the same debut position as The Beekeeper, although American Doll Posse sold fewer units in its week of release. This decrease is partially explained by the overall decline of sales in the music industry. At the time of the album's release, overall music sales for 2007 were down over 16% from the previous year's.

In the United Kingdom, limited-edition copies of the album were ruled to be ineligible for the UK Top 40 chart due to the inclusion of free art cards depicting each of the Posse members. Such promotional items were seen as giving "too much" of an additional sales incentive compared to normal releases, and thus giving unfair advantage. Faced with this, Amos deliberately chose not to issue a reduced packaging version of the special edition (as had been done with Scarlet's Walk), opting to keep the artwork intact.

== Track listing ==
All tracks are written by Tori Amos.

American Doll Posse
No.	Title	Doll(s)	Length
1.	"Yo George"	Isabel	1:25
2.	"Big Wheel"	Tori	3:15
3.	"Bouncing off Clouds"	Clyde, with Santa on background vocals	4:06
4.	"Teenage Hustling"	Pip	4:02
5.	"Digital Ghost"	Tori, with Clyde on background vocals	3:50
6.	"You Can Bring Your Dog"	Santa	4:04
7.	"Mr. Bad Man"	Isabel	3:18
8.	"Fat Slut"	Pip	0:41
9.	"Girl Disappearing"	Clyde	4:00
10.	"Secret Spell"	Santa	4:04
11.	"Devils and Gods"	Isabel	0:53
12.	"Body and Soul"	Pip and Santa	3:56
13.	"Father's Son"	Tori	3:59
14.	"Programmable Soda"	Santa	1:25
15.	"Code Red"	Tori, with Pip on background vocals	5:27
16.	"Roosterspur Bridge"	Clyde	4:01
17.	"Beauty of Speed"	Clyde	4:06
18.	"Almost Rosey"	Isabel	5:26
19.	"Velvet Revolution"	Pip	1:19
20.	"Dark Side of the Sun"	Isabel, with Tori on background vocals	4:16
21.	"Posse Bonus"	Tori	1:45
22.	"Smokey Joe"	Pip	4:19
23.	"Dragon"	Santa	5:03
Total length:			78:42

== Personnel ==
Adapted from the album's liner notes.

- Isabel – vocals on tracks 1, 7, 11, 18, 20
- Clyde – vocals on tracks 3, 9, 16, 17, background vocals on track 5
- Pip – vocals on tracks 4, 8, 12, 19, 22, background vocals on track 15
- Santa – vocals on tracks 6, 10, 12, 14, 23, background vocals on track 3
- Tori Amos – vocals on tracks 2, 5, 13, 15, 21, background vocals on track 20, Bösendorfer piano on tracks 1–7, 9–10, 12–23, electric piano on track 3, Fender-Rhodes on tracks 7, 13, 23, upright piano on track 17, Wurlitzer on track 20, clavichord on track 22, Mellotron on track 23
- Matt Chamberlain – drums & percussion on tracks 2–7, 9–10, 12–13, 15–18, 20–23
- Jon Evans – bass on tracks 2–7, 9–10, 12–13, 15–18, 20–23
- Mac Aladdin – electric guitar on tracks 2–8, 10, 12–13, 15–18, 20, 22–23, ukulele on tracks 7, 11, electric 6- and 12-string guitars on tracks 10, 13, 18, 20, mandolin on tracks 11, 19, acoustic guitar on tracks 11–12, 15–16, 20, ebow guitar on 22
- Edward Bale, Matthew Elston, Holly Butler, Rosmary Bank – string quartet on tracks 9, 14
- John Philip Shenale– string arrangement on tracks 9, 14, brass arrangement on track 14
- Nick Hitchens – tuba, euphonium on track 14

== Charts ==
Chart (2007)	Peak position
Australian Albums (ARIA)	20
Austrian Albums (Ö3 Austria)	14
Belgian Albums (Ultratop Flanders)	22
Belgian Albums (Ultratop Wallonia)	38
Canadian Albums (Billboard)	15
Danish Albums (Hitlisten)	22
Dutch Albums (Album Top 100)	5
European Albums	7
Finnish Albums (Suomen virallinen lista)	7
French Albums (SNEP)	48
German Albums (Offizielle Top 100)	10
Irish Albums (IRMA)	28
Italian Albums (FIMI)	18
Norwegian Albums (VG-lista)	11
Polish Albums (ZPAV)	26
Scottish Albums (Official Charts)	56
Swedish Albums (Sverigetopplistan)	24
Swiss Albums (Schweizer Hitparade)	15
Taiwan Albums	13
UK Albums (OCC)	50
US Billboard 200	5
US Top Digital Albums (Billboard)	2
US Top Internet Albums (Billboard)	3
US Top Rock Albums (Billboard)	2

== Sales ==
Region	Certification	Certified units/sales
United States	—	152,000

== Release history ==
Release history for American Doll Posse
Region	Date	Label	Format(s)	Ref.
United Kingdom	April 30, 2007	Columbia	CD	

== See also ==
- Legs and Boots
- List of anti-war songs
