= Jason Castro discography =

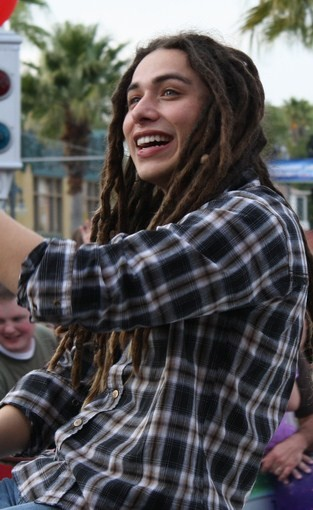
- Studio albums: 3
- EPs: 4
- Soundtrack albums: 1
- Compilation albums: 1
- Singles: 6
- Music videos: 1

The discography of Jason Castro.

== Albums ==
=== Studio albums ===
List of studio albums, with selected chart positions and certifications
Title	Album details	Peak chart positions		Sales
Title	Album details	US	US Christ.	Sales
Jason Castro	Released: April 13, 2010; Label: Atlantic Records; Format: CD, digital download	18	—	US: 54,000
Who I Am	Released: November 9, 2010; Label: Atlantic Records/Word; Format: CD, digital download	198	—	US: 18,000
Only a Mountain	Released: January 15, 2013; Label: Word; Format: CD, digital download	— (Note: Only a Mountain did not enter the Billboard 200, but did peak at number 183 on the Top Current Albums chart.)	14	US: 20,000
"—" denotes releases that did not chart or was not released in that territory

== EPs ==
Year	Album details	Peak positions	Sales
Year	Album details	US	Sales
2010	The Love Uncompromised EP: Released: January 2010; Label: Atlantic; Format: Extended play, digital download	94	US sales: 13,000
2010	Who I Am EP: Released: November 9, 2010; Label: Word; Format: Extended play, digital download	—	
2010	Changing Colors: Live From Studio 1290: Released: November 9, 2010; Label: Atlantic; Format: Extended play, digital download	—	
2012	Starting Line: Released: August 28, 2012; Label: Word; Format: Extended play, digital download	—	US sales: 2,000

== Singles ==
Year	Single	Peak						Album
Year	Single	US Bub.	US Pop	US Heat.	US AC	US Christ.	US Christ. Airplay	Album
2008	"White Christmas"	—	—	—	—	—	—	Non-album single
2009	"Let's Just Fall in Love Again"	1	94	15	—	—	—	The Love Uncompromised EP
2010	"That's What I'm Here For"	23	—	17	—	—	—	Jason Castro
2010	"Over the Rainbow"	—	—	—	—	—	—	Jason Castro
2010	"You Are"	—	—	—	84	11	14	Who I Am
2012	"Only a Mountain"	—	—	—	—	19	13	Only a Mountain
"—" denotes releases that did not chart

== Other releases ==
iTunes Exclusive "American Idol Live Performances"

1. "Daydream"
2. "I Just Want To Be Your Everything"
3. "Hallelujah"

iTunes Exclusive "American Idol Studio Performances"^{1}

1. "If I Fell"
2. "Michelle"
3. "Fragile"
4. "Travelin' Thru"
5. "Over The Rainbow"
6. "I Don't Wanna Cry"
7. "Memory"
8. "Forever In Blue Jeans"
9. "Mr. Tambourine Man"

Demos and live recordings (pre-Idol songs)

1. "The Other Side"
2. "Someday" (with Jackie Castro)
3. "A Song About Stars"
4. "So Fast"
5. "I'm Not Who I Was"
6. "Crazy" (live)
7. "Santeria" (live)
8. "Clumsy" (live)

Soundtracks

- "Hallelujah", Amar a Morir soundtrack
- "Memory", Titanic soundtrack

=== Releases with Michael and Jackie Castro ===
Jason Castro has released covers on iTunes with his two younger siblings, both of whom are also singer-songwriters. He has released covers of other popular songs with them and they have been released as singles; with his younger brother, Michael, he has released three and as a family trio named Castro (Jason, Michael and younger sister Jackie), they have released four covers as singles. The Castro siblings released their first music video for their original song "Rock and Roll" on YouTube on May 10, 2015.

==== Covers ====
- "Best Song Ever" – Michael Castro (featuring Jason Castro)
- "I'll Be Home for Christmas" (duet with Michael Castro)
- "Hey Brother" (duet with Michael Castro)
- "White Christmas" – Castro
- "Still Into You" – Castro
- "Roar" – Castro
- "Chocolate" – Castro

==== Original songs ====
- "Rock and Roll" (2015)
