= Eric Rosse =

American songwriter and producer

- Born: Eric Ivan Rosse; Chicago, Illinois, U.S.
- Origin: San Francisco, California
- Genres: Pop; rock; television film
- Occupations: Record producer; composer; songwriter; musician; mixer
- Instruments: Keyboards; piano
- Years active: 1989–present
- Label: Capitol
- Website: ericrosse.com

Eric Ivan Rosse is an American composer, songwriter, record producer, and mixer.

Rosse started playing piano at age 8, eventually studying orchestration and arranging with Joe Rotundi, Sr. His style is influenced by soul, rock, art pop, and classical music.

After playing in numerous bands as a keyboard player and singer, he expanded on his career by scoring TV and commercials; he then produced Tori Amos' albums Little Earthquakes and Under the Pink.

Since then, he has been instrumental in projects as diverse as Sara Bareilles' album Little Voice, Maroon 5, Birdy, Gavin DeGraw, Andra Day, Mary Lambert, and Benny Cassette.

Rosse has also worked with Pablo Alborán and Vanesa Martín Mata. He produced and composed Alborán's Terral, which received a Latin Grammy and Grammy nominations.

Rosse co-wrote with Steve Aoki and Louis Tomlinson, penning the latter's solo debut single. The song is certified Gold and Platinum in several countries, including reaching #1 on the US Dance/Electronic Sales Singles Billboard chart.

== Life and career ==
Rosse was born in Chicago and began studying music at a young age, starting with piano lessons. Through his training with Joe Rotundi Sr., he came to score an award-winning short film at the age of 17, Day's Last Rainbow, which was directed by James Herring. His first professional recording gig was at The Sound Factory in Hollywood, California, in 1980. Rosse was hired there to play electric piano on various R&B recordings and continued gigging with various bands and musicians around Los Angeles until 1989, when he co-founded EMBR Music with his brother, Michael Carey. They operated for five years under the name EMBR, producing music spots for well-known media entities such as Coca-Cola, TDK, Anacin, Sega, Asics, NY AIDS Awareness, NBC, and CBS.

In 1994, Rosse began to focus heavily on album production, setting up his studio in unusual locations such as Taos and Santa Fe, New Mexico (where he produced Tori Amos' records), as well as AIR Studios in London, where he produced projects for EMI-UK and Sony Music.

From 2002–2003, Rosse began working as an A&R consultant for Capitol Records.

Currently, Rosse resides in Los Angeles and continues to produce, compose, and mix.

== Discography ==
Year	Artist	Album	Song	Credit	Record Company
1992	Tori Amos	Little Earthquakes	Girl	Produced	Atlantic Records
1992	Tori Amos	Little Earthquakes	Precious Things	Produced	Atlantic Records
1992	Tori Amos	Little Earthquakes	Tear in Your Hand	Produced	Atlantic Records
1992	Tori Amos	Little Earthquakes	Little Earthquakes	Produced	Atlantic Records
1994	Tori Amos	Under the Pink	God	Produced	Atlantic Records
1994	Tori Amos	Under the Pink	Cornflake Girl	Produced	Atlantic Records
1994	Tori Amos	Under the Pink	Past the Mission ft. Trent Reznor	Produced	Atlantic Records
1994	Tori Amos	Under the Pink	Pretty Good Year	Produced	Atlantic Records
1996	Gus	Gus	Tomorrow Man	Produced/Engineered/Keyboards/Programming/Arrangements	Almo Sounds
1996	Gus	Gus	A Day's Pay	Produced/Engineered/Keyboards/Programming/Arrangements	Almo Sounds
1997	Critters Buggin	Host	Mullet Head	Produced/Engineered/Mixed/Keyboards/Programming	Loosegroove Records
1998	Tuatara	Trading with the Enemy	Negotiation	Mixed	Epic Records
1998	Critters Buggin	Bumpa	Trucker Beak	Produced/Engineered/Mixed/Keyboards/Programming	Loosegroove Records
2000	Nash Kato	Debutante	Queen of the Gangsters	Produced/Engineered/Mixed/Keyboards/Programming	Loosegroove Records
2000	Nash Kato	Debutante	Debutante	Produced/Engineered/Mixed/Keyboards/Programming	Loosegroove Records
2000	Nash Kato	Debutante	Zooey Suicide	Produced/Engineered/Mixed/Keyboards/Programming	Loosegroove Records
2002	Aja Daashuur	Before the Beginning		Produced/Engineered/Keyboards/Programming	Extasy/Warner Bros. Records
2002	Two Loons for Tea	Looking for Landmarks	Looking for Landmarks	Produced/Engineered/Mixed/Keyboards/Programming	Sarathan Records
2002	Two Loons for Tea	Looking for Landmarks	Emily	Produced/Engineered/Mixed/Keyboards/Programming	Sarathan Records
2002	Two Loons for Tea	Looking for Landmarks	Blue Suit	Produced/Engineered/Mixed/Keyboards/Programming	Sarathan Records
2003	Lisa Marie Presley	To Whom It May Concern	Lights Out	Produced/Co-Wrote/Engineered/Keyboards/Programming/String Arrangements	Capitol Records
2003	Lisa Marie Presley	To Whom It May Concern	SOB	Produced/Co-Wrote/Engineered/Keyboards/Programming/String Arrangements	Capitol Records
2003	Lisa Marie Presley	To Whom It May Concern	The Road Between	Produced/Co-Wrote/Engineered/Keyboards/Programming/String Arrangements	Capitol Records
2003	Lisa Marie Presley	To Whom It May Concern	Indifferent	Produced/Co-Wrote/Engineered/Keyboards/Programming/String Arrangements	Capitol Records
2003	Lisa Marie Presley	To Whom It May Concern	Better Beware	Produced/Co-Wrote/Engineered/Keyboards/Programming/String Arrangements	Capitol Records
2003	Kristy Thirsk	Souvenir	Run Away	Produced	Pretty Noise
2003	Kristy Thirsk	Souvenir	Home for Angels	Produced	Pretty Noise
2005	Anna Nalick	Wreck of the Day	Breathe	Produced/Co-Wrote/Engineered/Mixed/Keyboards/Programming/String Arrangements	Columbia Records
2005	Anna Nalick	Wreck of the Day	Satellite	Produced/Co-Wrote/Engineered/Mixed/Keyboards/Programming/String Arrangements	Columbia Records
2005	Anna Nalick	Wreck of the Day	Wreck of the Day	Produced/Co-Wrote/Engineered/Mixed/Keyboards/Programming/String Arrangements	Columbia Records
2005	Anna Nalick	Wreck of the Day	Paper Bag	Produced/Co-Wrote/Engineered/Mixed/Keyboards/Programming/String Arrangements	Columbia Records
2005	Lisa Marie Presley	Now What	Turned To Black	Produced/Co-Wrote/Engineered/Keyboards/Programming	Capitol Records
2005	Lisa Marie Presley	Now What	Dirty Laundry	Produced/Co-Wrote/Engineered/Keyboards/Programming	Capitol Records
2005	Lisa Marie Presley	Now What	When You Go	Produced/Co-Wrote/Engineered/Keyboards/Programming	Capitol Records
2005	Lisa Marie Presley	Now What	Yellow to Blue	Produced/Co-Wrote/Engineered/Keyboards/Programming	Capitol Records
2005	Nerina Pallot	Fires	Learning to Breathe	Produced/Engineered/Keyboards/Programming	Idaho Records/14th Floor Records
2005	Nerina Pallot	Fires	Heart Attack	Produced/Engineered/Keyboards/Programming	Idaho Records/14th Floor Records
2006	Joanna Pacitti	This Crazy Life	This Crazy Life	Co-Wrote	UMG/Geffen Records
2006	Chris Isaak	Best of Chris Isaak	King Without A Castle	Produced/Engineered/Programming/Arrangements	Warner Bros. Records/Reprise Records
2006	Chris Isaak	Best of Chris Isaak	Want You to Want Me	Produced/Engineered/Programming/Arrangements	Warner Bros. Records/Reprise Records
2006	Chris Isaak	Best of Chris Isaak	Let's Have a Party	Produced/Engineered/Programming/Arrangements	Warner Bros. Records/Reprise Records
2007	A Fine Frenzy	One Cell in the Sea	Almost Lover	Re-mixed	Virgin Records
2007	Sara Bareilles	Little Voice	Love Song	Produced/Engineered/Mixed/Keyboards/Programming/String Arrangements	Sony Records/Epic Records
2007	Sara Bareilles	Little Voice	Vegas	Produced/Engineered/Mixed/Keyboards/Programming/String Arrangements	Sony Records/Epic Records
2007	Sara Bareilles	Little Voice	Between the Lines	Produced/Engineered/Mixed/Keyboards/Programming/String Arrangements	Sony Records/Epic Records
2007	Sara Bareilles	Little Voice	Bottle It Up	Produced/Engineered/Mixed/Keyboards/Programming/String Arrangements	Sony Records/Epic Records
2007	Sara Bareilles	Little Voice	City	Produced/Engineered/Mixed/Keyboards/Programming/String Arrangements	Sony Records/Epic Records
2008	Marc Broussard	Keep Coming Back	Man for Life	Co-Wrote	Atlantic Records
2008	David Archuleta	David Archuleta	Let Me Go	Produced/Engineered/Mixed/Keyboards/Programming/String Arrangements	Jive Records/Sony Records
2008	David Archuleta	David Archuleta	Angels	Produced/Engineered/Mixed/Keyboards/Programming/String Arrangements	Jive Records/Sony Records
2008	The White Tie Affair	Walk This Way	Candle	Mixed/Programming	Sony Records
2008	The White Tie Affair	Walk This Way	Price of Company	Mixed/Programming	Sony Records
2008	The White Tie Affair	Walk This Way	The Way Down	Mixed/Programming	Sony Records
2008	The White Tie Affair	Walk This Way	If I Fall	Mixed/Programming	Sony Records
2008	Anna Nalick	Shine EP		Produced	Epic
2008	George Stanford	Big Drop		Produced	Mercury Records
2008	Matt Hires	Live from the Hotel Café	You Are The One	Produced	Atlantic Records
2009	Chris Isaak	Mr. Lucky	Cheaters Town	Produced/Engineered/Mixed	Warner Bros. Records/Wicked Game/Reprise Records
2009	Chris Isaak	Mr. Lucky	We Let her Down	Produced/Engineered/Mixed	Warner Bros. Records/Wicked Game/Reprise Records
2009	Chris Isaak	Mr. Lucky	Breakin Apart	Produced/Engineered/Mixed	Warner Bros. Records/Wicked Game/Reprise Records
2009	Chris Isaak	Mr. Lucky	Baby Baby	Produced/Engineered/Mixed	Warner Bros. Records/Wicked Game/Reprise Records
2009	Landon Pigg	The Boy Who Never	Coffee Shop	Produced/Engineered/Mixed/Keyboards	RCA Records
2009	Landon Pigg	The Boy Who Never	Take a Chance	Produced/Engineered/Mixed/Keyboards	RCA Records
2009	Matt Hires	Take Us to the Start	Honey, Let Me Sing You a Song	Produced/Co-Wrote/Engineered/Mixed/Keyboards/String Arrangements	F Stop/Atlantic Records/Warner Music Group
2009	Matt Hires	Take Us to the Start	A Perfect Day	Produced/Co-Wrote/Engineered/Mixed/Keyboards/String Arrangements	F Stop/Atlantic Records/Warner Music Group
2009	Matt Hires	Take Us to the Start	State Lines	Produced/Co-Wrote/Engineered/Mixed/Keyboards/String Arrangements	F Stop/Atlantic Records/Warner Music Group
2009	Matt Hires	Take Us to the Start	You in the End	Produced/Co-Wrote/Engineered/Mixed/Keyboards/String Arrangements	F Stop/Atlantic Records/Warner Music Group
2009	Matt Hires	Take Us to the Start	Out of the Dark	Produced/Co-Wrote/Engineered/Mixed/Keyboards/String Arrangements	F Stop/Atlantic Records/Warner Music Group
2009	Matt Hires	Take Us to the Start	Listen to Me Now	Produced/Co-Wrote/Engineered/Mixed/Keyboards/String Arrangements	F Stop/Atlantic Records/Warner Music Group
2009	Matt Hires	Take Us to the Start	Pick Me Up	Produced/Co-Wrote/Engineered/Mixed/Keyboards/String Arrangements	F Stop/Atlantic Records/Warner Music Group
2009	Matt Hires	Take Us to the Start	"O Sunrise	Produced/Co-Wrote/Engineered/Mixed/Keyboards/String Arrangements	F Stop/Atlantic Records/Warner Music Group
2010	Jason Castro	Jason Castro	You Can Always Come Home	Produced/Engineered/Mixed/Keyboards	Atlantic Records
2010	Jason Castro	Jason Castro	That's What I'm Here For	Produced/Engineered/Mixed/Keyboards	Atlantic Records
2010	Brendan James	Brendan James	Anything For You	Co-Wrote	UMG/Decca Records
2010	Matt Hires	A to B EP	Honey (cello version)	Produced/Co-Wrote/Engineered/Mixed/Keyboards/String Arrangements	Atlantic Records
2010	Maroon 5	Hands All Over		Produced	A&M/Octone Records
2011	Gin Wigmore	Gravel & Wine	The Devil In Me	Produced/Co-Wrote	UMG/Motown Records/Mercury Records
2011	Gin Wigmore	Gravel & Wine	Saturday Smile	Produced/Co-Wrote	UMG/Motown Records/Mercury Records
2011	Kevin Hammond	Kevin Hammon EP	The Way You Move	Produced/Recorded/Mixed/Keyboards/Programming	A&M/Octone Records
2011	Kevin Hammond	Kevin Hammon EP	Broken Down	Produced/Recorded/Mixed/Keyboards/Programming	A&M/Octone Records
2011	Kevin Hammond	Kevin Hammon EP	Just As I Thought	Produced/Recorded/Mixed/Keyboards/Programming	A&M/Octone Records
2011	Gavin DeGraw	Sweeter	Run Every Time	Produced/Recorded/Keyboards/Programming	RCA Records
2011	Gavin DeGraw	Sweeter	Where You Are	Produced/Recorded/Keyboards/Programming	RCA Records
2011	Graham Colton	Pacific Coast Eyes	A Day Too Late	Co-Wrote	Universal Republic
2012	Delta Goodrem	Child of the Universe	The Hunters and The Wolves	Co-Wrote	Sony Records
2012	Lily Kershaw	Midnight in the Garden		Produced	Nettwerk Records
2013	Matt Hires	The World Won't last Forever, But Tonight We Can Pretend	All That's Left Is You	Produced/Co-Wrote/Engineered/Mixed/Keyboards/String Arrangements	Atlantic Records/Warner Music Group
2013	Matt Hires	The World Won't last Forever, But Tonight We Can Pretend	Wishing On Dead Stars	Produced/Co-Wrote/Engineered/Mixed/Keyboards/String Arrangements	Atlantic Records/Warner Music Group
2013	Matt Hires	The World Won't last Forever, But Tonight We Can Pretend	Over You	Produced/Co-Wrote/Engineered/Mixed/Keyboards/String Arrangements	Atlantic Records/Warner Music Group
2013	Matt Hires	The World Won't last Forever, But Tonight We Can Pretend	A to B	Produced/Co-Wrote/Engineered/Mixed/Keyboards/String Arrangements	Atlantic Records/Warner Music Group
2013	Matt Hires	The World Won't last Forever, But Tonight We Can Pretend	I Am Not Here	Produced/Co-Wrote/Engineered/Mixed/Keyboards/String Arrangements	Atlantic Records/Warner Music Group
2013	Birdy	Fire Within	Heart of Gold	Musical Director/String Arrangements/Programming/Keyboards	Warner Music Group UK/14th Floor Records/Atlantic Records
2013	Mary Lambert	Welcome to the Age of My Body EP	She Keeps Me Warm	Produced/Engineered/Mixed/Keyboards/Programming/String Arrangements	Capitol Records
2013	Mary Lambert	Welcome to the Age of My Body EP	Body Love Part One	Produced/Engineered/Mixed/Keyboards/Programming/String Arrangements	Capitol Records
2013	Christian Burns	Simple Modern Answers	We Are Tonight ft. Paul van Dyk	Co-Wrote	Armada Music
2014	Mary Lambert	Heart on My Sleeve		Produced/Co-Wrote	Capitol Records
2014	Pablo Alborán	Terral		Produced/Mixed/Keyboards/Programming/String & Horn Arrangements	Warner Music
2016	Idina Menzel	idina.		Produced/Mixed/Co-Wrote	Warner Bros. Records
2017	Idina Menzel	Beaches (Soundtrack from the Lifetime Original Movie)		Produced/Arranged/Co-Wrote	Warner Bros. Records

== Singles ==
- 1991 Tori Amos – "Me and a Gun"
- 1992 Tori Amos – "Silent All These Years", "China", "Winter", "Crucify"
- 1994 Tori Amos – "God", "Pretty Good Year", "Cornflake Girl", "Past the Mission"
- 2003 Lisa Marie Presley – "Lights Out"
- 2004 & 2006 Anna Nalick – "Breathe (2 AM)"
- 2005 Lisa Marie Presley – "Dirty Laundry"
- 2007 Sara Bareilles – "Love Song"
- 2007 A Fine Frenzy – "Almost Lover" (Remix)
- 2008 Sara Bareilles – "Bottle It Up"
- 2008 George Stanford – "My Own Worst Enemy"
- 2008 The White Tie Affair – "Candle (Sick and Tired)"
- 2009 Sara Bareilles – "Gravity"
- 2009 Matt Hires – "Honey, Let Me Sing You a Song"
- 2009 Landon Pigg – "Falling in Love at a Coffee Shop"
- 2010 Jason Castro – "That's What I'm Here For"
- 2014 Mary Lambert – "Secrets"
- 2016 Louis Tomlinson – "Just Hold On"

== TV Placements ==
- 2009 "A Perfect Day" by Matt Hires (Private Practice) Season 2: Episode 15 – Acceptance
- 2009 "Out of the Dark" by Matt Hires (Grey's Anatomy) Season 6: Episode 6 – I Saw What I Saw
- 2010 "Honey, Let Me Sing You a Song" by Matt Hires (Life Unexpected) Pilot Episode
- 2010 "O Sunrise" by Matt Hires (Life Unexpected) Season 1: Episode 6 – Truth Unrevealed
- 2010 "Honey, Let Me Sing You a Song" by Matt Hires (Cougar Town) Season 1: Episode 12 – Scare Easy
- 2010 "The Way It Ends" by Landon Pigg (Grey's Anatomy) Season 6: Episode 24 Season Finale – Death and All His Friends
- 2011 "Breathe" by Anna Nalick (Grey's Anatomy) Season 7: Episode 18 –
- 2012 "As It Seems" by Lily Kershaw (Criminal Minds) Season 7: Episode 24 Season Finale – Run Part Two
- 2013 "Forever" by Matt Hires (Grey's Anatomy) Season 9: Episode 12 – Walking on a Dream
- 2017 "I'll Stand By You" by Idina Menzel for the TV movie remake of the film Beaches
- 2017 "I Can Hear the Music" by Idina Menzel for the TV movie remake of the film Beaches
