= Pretty Good Year =

1994 single by Tori Amos

Single by Tori Amos

from the album Under the Pink
- B-side: "Honey"
- Released: March 7, 1994
- Studio: The Fishhouse (Taos, New Mexico)
- Length: 3:25
- Label: EastWest
- Songwriter: Tori Amos
- Producers: Tori Amos; Eric Rosse

Tori Amos singles chronology
"God" (1994)	"Pretty Good Year" (1994)	"Past the Mission" (1994)

Music video
- "Pretty Good Year" on YouTube

"Pretty Good Year" is a song by American singer-songwriter and pianist Tori Amos, taken from her second studio album, Under the Pink (1994). It was released by East West Records as the second single from the album in the United Kingdom on March 7, 1994, and as the fourth single in Australia on November 7, 1994. It was not released in the United States. "Pretty Good Year" became Amos's second single to reach the top 10 on the UK singles chart, peaking at number seven.

== Critical reception ==
Alan Jones from Music Week gave the song three out of five, saying, "The second single from Amos's chart-topping Under the Pink album is an alluring, lyricai and lilting slab of introspection. With less appeal than 'Cornflake Girl', it offers a quartet of exclusive songs spread over two CDs by way of compensation." Pan-European magazine Music & Media wrote, "Never boring, Tori refuses to follow up the relatively "easy" single 'Cornflake Girl' with another one in the same vein. A sensitive piano ballad is her answer to such expectations."

== Track listings ==
- UK 7-inch single

A. "Pretty Good Year"
B. "Honey"

- UK CD1
1. "Pretty Good Year" – 3:26
2. "Home on the Range" (with Cherokee addition) – 5:24
3. "Daisy Dead Petals" – 3:02
- UK CD2 and Australian CD single
1. "Pretty Good Year" – 3:25
2. "Honey" – 3:47
3. "Black Swan" – 4:04

== Credits and personnel ==
Credits are adapted from the Under the Pink album booklet.

Studios

- Recorded at The Fishhouse (Taos, New Mexico)
- Strings recorded at Westlake Studios (Los Angeles)
- Mixed at Olympic Studios (London, England)
- Mastered at Gateway Mastering (Portland, Maine, US)

Personnel

- Tori Amos – writing, vocals, piano, production
- John Philip Shenale – string arrangement
- Scott Smalley – conducting
- Ezra Kliger – violin
- Nancy Roth – violin
- John Wittenberg – violin
- Francine Walsh – violin
- Michael Harrison – violin
- Chris Reutinger – violin
- Jimbo Ross – viola
- Cynthia Morrow – viola
- John Acevedo – viola
- Nancy Stein-Ross – cello
- Dane Little – cello
- Melissa Hasin – cello
- Dominic Genova – double bass
- George Porter Jr. – "hanging out"
- Carlo Nuccio – "hanging out"
- Eric Rosse – production, programming
- John Beverly Jones – recording
- Kevin Killen – mixing
- Bob Ludwig – mastering

== Charts ==
Chart (1994)	Peak position
Australia (ARIA)	85
Canada Adult Contemporary (RPM)	32
Europe (Eurochart Hot 100)	23
Ireland (IRMA)	26
Scottish Singles Sales (Official Charts)	5
UK Singles (Official Charts)	7

== Release history ==
Region	Date	Format(s)	Label(s)	Ref.
United Kingdom	March 7, 1994	7-inch vinyl; CD; cassette	EastWest	
Australia	November 7, 1994	CD; cassette	EastWest	
