= Shine (Anna Nalick EP) =

EP by Anna Nalick
- Released: March 25, 2008
- Genre: Pop
- Length: 20:21
- Label: Epic
- Producer: Eric Ivan Rosse

Anna Nalick chronology
Wreck of the Day (2005)	Shine (2008)	Broken Doll & Odds & Ends (2011)

Shine is a five-song extended play by American singer-songwriter Anna Nalick, released on March 25, 2008. It is composed of the album version of "Shine", two acoustic versions of songs from her debut album ("Breathe (2 AM)" and "Wreck of the Day"), a cover version of Red Hot Chili Peppers' song "Breaking the Girl", and an acoustic version of the title track. The EP was recorded at NRG Recording in North Hollywood, California, and at SquawkBox Studio in Los Angeles, and mastered at Bernie Grundman Mastering in Hollywood.

The EP was intended to be an intro to her second album, but the album was cancelled due to a dispute with her label, Sony Music.

== Track listing ==
All tracks are written by Anna Nalick, except where noted

No.	Title	Writer(s)	Length
1.	"Shine" (album version)		3:32
2.	"Breathe (2 AM)" (acoustic version)		4:17
3.	"Wreck of the Day" (acoustic version)		3:57
4.	"Breaking the Girl" (album version)	Flea, John Frusciante, Anthony Kiedis, Chad Smith	4:54
5.	"Shine" (acoustic version)		3:41
Total length:			20:21

== Personnel ==
Musicians

- Anna Nalick: acoustic guitar, vocals
- Bruce Watson: electric guitar, acoustic guitar
- Chris Chaney bass
- Eric Ivan Rosse: keyboards, programming
- Brian MacLeod: drums

Production

- Eric Ivan Rosse: producer, arranger, audio production, mixing, overdub engineer, vocal engineer
- Brian "Big Bass" Gardner: mastering
- Howard Christopher Willing: engineer, recording
- Eric Taylor: assistant engineer
