= Under the Pink =

Studio album by Tori Amos
- Released: January 31, 1994
- Recorded: February–October 1993
- Studios: The Fishhouse (Taos, New Mexico); Westlake (Los Angeles, California)
- Length: 56:50
- Labels: Atlantic (US); East West (Europe)
- Producers: Tori Amos; Eric Rosse

Tori Amos chronology
Little Earthquakes (1992)	Under the Pink (1994)	Boys for Pele (1996)

Singles from Under the Pink
- 1. "Cornflake Girl" Released: January 10, 1994; 2. "God" Released: February 3, 1994; 3. "Pretty Good Year" Released: March 7, 1994; 4. "Past the Mission" Released: May 16, 1994

Under the Pink is the second studio album by American singer-songwriter and pianist Tori Amos. Upon its release in January 1994, the album debuted atop the UK Albums Chart on the back of the hit single "Cornflake Girl", and peaked at number 12 in the US.

The album was certified double Platinum in the US by the RIAA in October 1999, for sales exceeding 2 million copies. It was the 61st highest-selling album of 1994 in the UK and was certified platinum by the BPI in February 2007, for sales exceeding 300,000 copies.

Under the Pink was included in Blender magazine's list of 500 CDs You Must Own, and was voted among the greatest albums of the 1990s by Rolling Stone magazine some years later. A special double-disc tour edition was released exclusively in Australia and New Zealand in November 1994, titled More Pink: The B-Sides.

== Background ==
On Tori Amos' second solo album, the singer-songwriter continued to offer piano-driven rock songs dealing with religion, gender, and sexuality. In addition to featuring more cryptic lyrics and experimental song structures, Amos invited in reggae influences on the single "Cornflake Girl", prepared piano on "Bells for Her" by John Philip Shenale, and Debussy-inspired piano lines on "Yes, Anastasia".

Amos performed the Under the Pink tour from February through November 1994, encompassing many of the same stops as on the previous world tour. A limited edition release of the album commemorating the Australian tour included a second disc entitled More Pink, a collection of rare B-sides like "Little Drummer Boy" and a cover version of Joni Mitchell's "A Case of You", was issued in November 1994. During this period, she also contributed the song "Butterfly" to the soundtrack for the 1994 movie Higher Learning, as well as a cover of the R.E.M. song "Losing My Religion".

The original track listing included the B-side "Honey", which was left off the album at the last minute. Amos has since voiced great regret for this:

"There were certain songs that were supposed to be on the record that got kicked off. 'Honey' was supposed to be on the record and, in retrospect, I wish it had been. I kicked it off for 'The Wrong Band'. Under the Pink wept when 'Honey' wasn't on, and she still is angry with me about it."

Amos made a similar reference to the song "Here. In My Head" which was originally featured as a B-side to the UK single of "Crucify".

The album was recorded in Taos, New Mexico in a hacienda. The album artwork features several Native American and New Mexican references in the photography. The album is also notable as the last Amos album to feature the production of Eric Rosse as they split that year.

== Singles ==
Under the Pink produced four singles. "Cornflake Girl" was released as the first single from the album in Europe and Australia and as the second single in North America. It became Amos's biggest international hit at the time, peaking at number four in the UK. "God" was released as the first single in the United States in February 1994, becoming her first Billboard Hot 100 chart entry, peaking at number 72. "God" was released as the second single from the album in Australia and as the fourth single in Europe. "Pretty Good Year" was released as the second single in Europe and the fourth single in Australia but was not released as a single in the United States. "Past the Mission", featuring backing vocals from Trent Reznor of Nine Inch Nails, was the third single from the album in all territories.

== B-sides ==
European pressings of the "Cornflake Girl" CD single, and the US pressing of the "God" CD single, contained the B-sides "All the Girls Hate Her" and "Over It". "Sister Janet" appeared on both the European and US pressing of the "Cornflake Girl" single, and a B-side of the US cassette single for "God", while the US CD single of "God" also contained "Home on the Range – Cherokee Edition". The US "Cornflake Girl" CD single, which had different artwork to international pressings, contained a radio edit of the title track, plus the songs "Daisy Dead Petals" and "Honey". A limited edition second CD single for "Cornflake Girl" was issued in the UK, containing cover versions of Joni Mitchell's "A Case of You", Jimi Hendrix's "If 6 Was 9", and Billie Holiday's "Strange Fruit".

Part one of the UK CD single "Pretty Good Year" contained the B-sides "Home on the Range – Cherokee Edition" and "Daisy Dead Petals". The latter track was used as a B-side on the US pressing of "Cornflake Girl". "Honey" and "Black Swan" appeared as B-sides on part two of the UK "Pretty Good Year" CD single.

Seven live tracks were spread across a two-part CD single release for "Past the Mission" in the UK. Live versions of "Upside Down", "Past the Mission", "Icicle" and "Flying Dutchman" appeared on the limited edition part one disc, and live versions of "Winter", "The Waitress" and "Here. In My Head" appeared on part two.

The UK release of "God" contained several remixes of the title track.

== Critical reception ==
Professional ratings
Review scores
Source	Rating
AllMusic	4.5/5 stars
Chicago Tribune	3.5/4 stars
Entertainment Weekly	B
Los Angeles Times	2/4 stars
NME	6/10
Pitchfork	8.1/10
Record Collector	5/5 stars
Rolling Stone	3.5/5 stars
The Rolling Stone Album Guide	4/5 stars
USA Today	3/4 stars

Reviewing Under the Pink for Rolling Stone, Marie Elsie St. Léger opined that the album "doesn't match Amos' riveting, piano-only live performances, but it sure comes close", calling it an "honest reporting of a life fraught with turmoil and disappointment." Chicago Tribune critic Brad Webber noted "the latent feminism" throughout Under the Pink and highlighted Amos's "tough veneer" and "genuine" emotion, while USA Today's Edna Gundersen said that Amos had made "big strides" with an album that "finds her blasting patriarchy and breaking free of religious repression, victimhood and sexual guilt." Jean Rosenbluth of the Los Angeles Times, however, found Amos's lyrics "so obtuse—in an overreaching stab at profundity—that they're almost meaningless", a sentiment echoed by John Harris of NME, who likened listening to the album to being "locked in a semantic castle".

Retrospectively, AllMusic's Ned Raggett stated that Under the Pink "has often been considered a transitional album" and thus tends to be "unfairly neglected when in fact it has as good a claim as any to be one of the strongest, and maybe even the strongest, record she has put out." Writing for Record Collector, Nicola Rayner said that the album, like its 1992 predecessor Little Earthquakes, explored "weighty subjects in raw, confessional songs that reimagined the piano as a sensual and provocative instrument." Barry Walters of Pitchfork observed that Amos, allowed more creative freedom by her label following the commercial success of Little Earthquakes, "accentuated the orchestral pomp on some tracks while shrewdly deviating from it on others", while also noting that "Pink's extroverted arrangements worked as hard as Earthquakes' lyrics and melodies."

== Reissues ==
A double-disc version of Under the Pink was released on November 14, 1994 by East West to coincide with Amos's tour of Australia and New Zealand. The second disc, titled More Pink: The B-Sides was never released separately, and is a rarity amongst Tori Amos collectibles. Amos would not release another collection of B-sides until 2006's A Piano: The Collection. The packaging simply inserted the normal Australian release of Under the Pink in a double jewel case, and altered the back insert artwork so that instead of being blank it featured the track listing of the second disc as well as production information for the songs. The title More Pink may be misleading, as many of the B-sides on the disc did not come from Under the Pink singles but in fact from Little Earthquakes, and in one case, from a Christmas compilation.

The double-disc set entered the Australian ARIA Charts Top 100 Albums chart on the week ending December 11, 1994, peaking at number 44 and spending 6 weeks on the chart. However, it was listed on the chart as a re-entry of Under the Pink, with its weeks spent charting added to the 21-week tally achieved earlier by the album.

A 2-disc deluxe edition of the album was released on April 14, 2015 by Rhino Records. This bonus disc included seven b-sides, one remix and seven live performances from the various singles released from the album in 1994. Three b-sides were missing from this release; a cover of "A Case of You" by Joni Mitchell, a cover of "If 6 Was 9" by The Jimi Hendrix Experience and a cover of "Strange Fruit" by Billie Holiday, all of which were exclusively released in the United Kingdom on a limited edition CD single of "Cornflake Girl".

== Track listing ==
All songs written by Tori Amos. All songs produced by Eric Rosse and Tori Amos.

Under the Pink track listing
No.	Title	Length
1.	"Pretty Good Year"	3:25
2.	"God"	3:58
3.	"Bells for Her"	5:20
4.	"Past the Mission"	4:05
5.	"Baker Baker"	3:20
6.	"The Wrong Band"	3:03
7.	"The Waitress"	3:09
8.	"Cornflake Girl"	5:06
9.	"Icicle"	5:47
10.	"Cloud on My Tongue"	4:44
11.	"Space Dog"	5:10
12.	"Yes, Anastasia"	9:33
Total length:		56:50

More Pink: The B-Sides
No.	Title	Original release	Length
1.	"A Case of You"	"Cornflake Girl" single	4:38
2.	"Honey"	"Pretty Good Year" single	3:47
3.	"Daisy Dead Petals"	"Pretty Good Year" single	3:02
4.	"Sister Janet"	"Cornflake Girl" single	4:02
5.	"Sugar"	"China" single	4:27
6.	"Take to the Sky"	"Winter" single	4:20
7.	"Upside Down"	"Silent All These Years" single	4:22
8.	"Flying Dutchman"	"China" single	6:31
9.	"Here in My Head" (live)	"Past the Mission" single	6:05
10.	"Black Swan"	"Pretty Good Year" single	4:04
11.	"Little Drummer Boy" (live)	Kevin & Bean: We've Got Your Yule Logs Hangin'	3:20
Total length:			48:49

2015 deluxe edition bonus disc
No.	Title	Original release	Length
1.	"Sister Janet"	"Cornflake Girl" single	4:00
2.	"Honey"	"Pretty Good Year" single	3:44
3.	"Daisy Dead Petals"	"Pretty Good Year" single	3:02
4.	"Over It"	"Cornflake Girl" single	2:09
5.	"Black Swan"	"Pretty Good Year" single	4:01
6.	"Home on the Range"	"Pretty Good Year" single	5:20
7.	"All the Girls Hate Her"	"Cornflake Girl" single	2:22
8.	"God" (CJ Bolland remix)	"God" single	5:58
9.	"Here in My Head" (live 1994)	"Past the Mission" single	6:00
10.	"Upside Down" (live (Note: The liner notes of the physical release state this is a live performance from 1994 originally released on the "Past the Mission" single. However digital releases do not provide a date like the other live tracks. This is because a 1998 live performance from the "Bliss" single was included by mistake instead of the intended 1994 track.))	"Bliss" single	4:57
11.	"Past the Mission" (live 1994)	"Past the Mission" single	4:14
12.	"Icicle" (live 1994)	"Past the Mission" single	4:47
13.	"Flying Dutchman" (live 1994)	"Past the Mission" single	6:15
14.	"Winter" (live 1994)	"Past the Mission" single	6:19
15.	"The Waitress" (live 1994)	"Past the Mission" single	3:23

== Personnel ==
=== Band ===
- Tori Amos – Bösendorfer piano, Vox Continental on "Past the Mission", vocals, producer
- Steve Caton – guitar
- John Philip Shenale – ARP String Ensemble, Hammond organ
- George Porter Jr. – bass guitar
- Paulinho da Costa – percussion
- Carlo Nuccio – drums
- Trent Reznor – backing vocals

=== String section ===
- John Acevedo – viola
- Michael Allen Harrison – violin
- Melissa "Missy" Hasin – cello
- Ezra Killinger – violin
- Dane Little – cello
- Cynthia Morrow – viola
- Chris Reutinger – violin
- Jimbo Ross – viola
- Nancy Roth – violin
- Nancy Stein-Ross – cello
- Francine Walsh – violin
- John Wittenberg – violin

=== Production & art ===
- Paul McKenna – producer, engineer
- Eric Rosse – producer, engineer
- Ross Cullum – mixing
- Shaun DeFeo – assistant engineer
- John Fundi – assistant engineer
- John Beverly Jones – engineer
- Kevin Killen – mixing
- Julie Larson – production coordination
- Bob Ludwig – mastering
- Avril McIntosh – mixing assistant
- Cindy Palmano – art direction, photography
- Alan Reinl – design

== Charts ==
=== Weekly charts ===
Weekly chart performance for Under the Pink
Chart (1994)	Peak position
Australian Albums (ARIA)	5
Austrian Albums (Ö3 Austria)	6
Canada Top Albums/CDs (RPM)	11
Dutch Albums (Album Top 100)	10
European Albums (Music & Media)	6
Finland Albums (Suomen virallinen lista)	16
German Albums (Offizielle Top 100)	15
Irish Albums (IFPI)	5
Italian Albums (Musica e dischi)	16
New Zealand Albums (RMNZ)	15
Scottish Albums (Official Charts)	13
Swedish Albums (Sverigetopplistan)	15
Swiss Albums (Schweizer Hitparade)	11
UK Albums (Official Charts)	1
US Billboard 200	12
US Cash Box Top 200 Albums	5

Chart performance for Under the Pink (2015 deluxe edition)
Chart (2015)	Peak position
Belgian Albums (Ultratop Flanders)	162
Dutch Albums (Album Top 100)	96
UK Album Sales (OCC)	100
UK Physical Albums (OCC)	75

Chart performance for Under the Pink (2021 reissue)
Chart (2021)	Peak position
Scottish Albums (OCC)	98
UK Album Sales (OCC)	97
UK Physical Albums (OCC)	90

=== Year-end charts ===
Year-end chart performance for Under the Pink
Chart (1994)	Position
Austrian Albums (Ö3 Austria)	38
Canada Top Albums/CDs (RPM)	57
Dutch Albums (Album Top 100)	99
European Albums (Music & Media)	38
German Albums (Offizielle Top 100)	64
Swiss Albums (Schweizer Hitparade)	37
UK Albums (OCC)	48
US Billboard 200	89

== Certifications ==
Region	Certification	Certified units/sales
Australia (ARIA)	Platinum	70,000^{^}
Canada (Music Canada)	Gold	50,000^{^}
Germany	—	120,000
Netherlands (NVPI)	Gold	50,000^{^}
United Kingdom (BPI)	Platinum	300,000^{^}
United States (RIAA)	2× Platinum	2,000,000^{^}
^{^} Shipments figures based on certification alone.

== Songs included in TV series ==
In 2015, "Pretty Good Year" was featured in television series Casual (Season 3, Episode 12).

In 2022, "Cornflake Girl" featured in the Irish drama television series Conversations with Friends (Season 1, Episode 10).

In 2023, "Cornflake Girl" was featured in the drama television series Yellowjackets (Season 2, Episode 1: "Friends, Romans, Coyntrymen") and the Netflix dramedy Beef (Season 1, Episode 2: "The Rapture of Being Alive").

"Bells For Her" was featured in Yellowjackets (Season 2, Episode 3: "Digestif").
