= Live Sessions (Matt Hires EP) =

EP by Matt Hires
- Released: March 8, 2011
- Recorded: 2009–2010 at the State Lines Tour
- Genre: Rock, pop
- Length: 16:12
- Label: Atlantic

Matt Hires chronology
| A to B (EP) (2010) | Live Sessions (2011) | 'Forever (EP)' (2013) |

Live Sessions is the third EP by American pop-rock singer-songwriter Matt Hires, released on March 8, 2011. This new release is a compilation of five live tracks, recorded with a full band at various times during Hires' 2009–2010 State Lines Tour. Upon its release, the EP broke into the top 10 on the iTunes Singer-Songwriter chart.

The EP featured three previously released material, as well as a new track "I Always Lose", and a cover of the American rock band MGMT's hit song "Kids".

== Background ==
=== Cover artwork ===
The EP's cover art was design and made by C1 Design & Photography. The original photo was taken by Rebecca Siegrist, the Creative Director and Founder of C1 Design, at the State Lines Tour.

=== Concept ===
The band and I just went into a studio and all sat around in a circle and played the songs and tried to approach them in little, different ways. Some of them are a little more stripped down than playing them live and some of them, there's a little more instrumentation. There will be different sounds, even on the songs people have heard before.

— Matt Hires on an interview with GlobalGrind Staff,

== Track listing ==
Live Sessions

| # | Title |
|---|---|
| 1. | "Out of the Dark (Live Sessions Version)" – 3:47 |
| 2. | "I Always Lose (Live Sessions Version)" – 2:14 |
| 3. | "Honey, Let Me Sing You a Song (Live Sessions Version)" – 4:02 |
| 4. | "Kids (Live Sessions Version)" – 2:51 |
| 5. | "A to B (Live Sessions Version)" – 3:15 |
