= Wreck of the Day =

Studio album by Anna Nalick
- Released: April 19, 2005
- Studio: Studio Wishbone (North Hollywood, California)
- Genre: Pop rock
- Length: 43:44
- Label: Columbia
- Producer: Eric Rosse; Christopher Thorn; Brad Smith

Anna Nalick chronology
Wreck of the Day (2005)	Shine (2008)

Alternative cover
- 2006 reissue cover

Singles from Wreck of the Day
- 1. "Breathe (2 AM)" Released: November 1, 2004; 2. "In the Rough" Released: October 10, 2005; 3. "Wreck of the Day" Released: 2006

Wreck of the Day is the debut studio album by American singer-songwriter Anna Nalick. It was released on April 19, 2005 by Columbia Records. The album was produced by Blind Melon member Brad Smith and former member Christopher Thorn at their own Studio Wishbone.

In 2006, an expanded edition of Wreck of the Day was released to stores. This expanded version included a rearranged version of the title track, three added demo songs, and new cover art.

== Critical reception ==
Professional ratings
Review scores
Source	Rating
AllMusic	3.5/5 stars
Rolling Stone	3/5 stars

Upon release, Wreck of the Day was met with positive critical acclaim by music critics, earning a 3/5 star rating from Rolling Stone.

== Chart performance ==
Wreck of the Day debuted at number 20 on the Billboard 200. The album charted for 27 weeks and was certified Gold by the RIAA on September 9, 2005. The album recharted for two weeks in March 2006 and then again for three weeks in July and August, bringing its chart run to 33 weeks.

== Track listing ==
All tracks are written by Anna Nalick

Standard edition
No.	Title	Length
1.	"Breathe (2 AM)"	4:40
2.	"Citadel"	2:46
3.	"Paper Bag"	3:27
4.	"Wreck of the Day"	4:06
5.	"Satellite"	4:00
6.	"Forever Love (Digame)"	3:16
7.	"In the Rough"	4:09
8.	"In My Head"	4:07
9.	"Bleed"	3:56
10.	"Catalyst"	3:39
11.	"Consider This"	3:35
Total length:		41:44

2006 re-release bonus tracks
No.	Title	Length
12.	"Wreck of the Day" ('06)	4:09
13.	"Drink Me" (acoustic version)	3:02
14.	"Soldier" (demo version)	5:18
15.	"More Than Melody" (demo version)	2:36
Total length:		56:46

Japan bonus tracks
No.	Title	Length
12.	"Drink Me" (acoustic version)	3:02
13.	"Catalyst" (acoustic version)	3:31
Total length:		48:17

== Personnel ==
Credits adapted from the liner notes of Wreck of the Day.

=== Musicians ===
- Anna Nalick – vocals, acoustic guitar
- Christopher Thorn – guitar
- Stuart Mathis – guitar
- Lyle Workman – guitar
- Brad Smith – bass, percussion
- Zak Rae – keyboards, piano, organ, harmonium
- Eric Rosse – keyboards, piano, organ, harmonium, string arrangements
- Joey Waronker – drums
- Matt Chamberlain – drums
- Cameron Stone – cello, string arrangements
- Christopher Nalick – percussion

=== Technical ===
- Eric Rosse – production
- Christopher Thorn – production
- Brad Smith – production
- Mark Endert – mixing
- Steve Marcussen – audio mastering

== Charts ==
=== Weekly charts ===
Chart (2005)	Peak position
New Zealand Albums (RMNZ)	14
US Billboard 200	20

=== Year-end charts ===
Chart (2005)	Position
US Billboard 200	148

== Certifications ==
Region	Certification	Certified units/sales
United States (RIAA)	Gold	500,000^{^}
^{^} Shipments figures based on certification alone.
