= Take Us to the Start =

Studio album by Matt Hires
- Released: July 15, 2009
- Genre: Pop rock
- Length: 41:57
- Label: Atlantic
- Producer: Eric Rosse

Matt Hires chronology
Live From the Hotel Café EP'' (2009)	Take Us to the Start (2009)	A to B EP'' (2010)

Alternative cover
- Deluxe Edition

Singles from Take Us to the Start
- 1. "Honey, Let Me Sing You a Song" Released: June 30, 2009

Take Us to the Start is the first full-length studio album by American pop-rock singer-songwriter Matt Hires, released exclusively through iTunes on July 15, 2009 and then released August 25, 2009 on Atlantic Records.

The digital-only release hit the top 10 on iTunes' "Top Albums" chart, despite only being available in a digital format, the album debuted at No. 96 on the Billboard 200 albums chart and No. 16 on the digital downloads chart.

All songs were written or co-written by Matt Hires and his long-time producer Eric Rosse (Sara Bareilles, Tori Amos). Matt has also collaborated with some noted songwriters, including Emmy Award nominated songwriter and novelist Harry Shannon, Indie singer-songwriter Gus Black, Gregg Wattenberg – who co-produced Train's quadruple platinum hit "Hey, Soul Sister" and Daughtry's platinum single "It's Not Over", he also co-wrote the song "You in the End" with Sara Bareilles.

An exclusive iTunes deluxe version of the album includes additional three bonus demo tracks, music video of "Honey, Let Me Sing You a Song", and a digital booklet.

== Background ==
=== Reading before songwriting ===
I try to read as much as I can, and I find that reading good books and poetry always helps put my mind in the right place to write lyrics. Listening to other great songs helps too. Bob Dylan is one of my favorite artists. His lyrics are incredible to me. They're very poetic and descriptive. I find that filling my mind with that type of stuff helps me write that way as well. Lately, I've been reading a lot of F. Scott Fitzgerald. One of my favorite books of all time is Lord of the Flies. I like Charles Dickens too. They're some of my favorites.

— Matt Hires,

=== Recording Process ===
For pretty much all the songs for the record, when we were recording, would start with an acoustic demo where we would just play the song, and we would build on that and change stuff around. We would use that as the skeleton of the song.

— Matt Hires,

=== Song co-writing ===
The whole co-writing thing was kind of hard for me to get used to at first, because my song writing process before was a very personal thing, just by myself, in my room, and it was hard to get used to opening up that thing to somebody else. But it was really cool to work with these folks- I feel like I learned a lot.

— Matt Hires,

== Notable song information ==
=== Honey, Let Me Sing You a Song ===
I started writing songs after my first real girlfriend broke up with me. I wrote one song that maybe wasn't necessarily the nicest, this song about a girl I was dating at the time who I had been friends with for a long time, but had a slow attraction that blossomed through that. That's what the song is about.

— Matt Hires

It was actually the first song that I wrote for her (his wife Rachel). We'd been friends for a while, and that's what the song's about. I never really saw the things that I started to see in her until I started becoming attracted to her.

— Matt Hires

=== State Lines ===
I always have a hard time describing songs and saying what they're about because a lot of them are about a lot of different things at the same time. I wrote that song right after the first nationwide tour I went on. I just recorded the album, we were getting ready to release it, and so it's kind of about getting my career going. It's about being on tour and being away from home at the same time, and about starting this new thing.

— Matt Hires

=== Turn The Page ===
That's the oldest song on the record. I wrote it probably four-and-a-half or five years ago, and it was right after a break-up, right when it kind of sank in for me. I remember sitting in my bedroom at my house, and I picked up my guitar and just kind of wrote whatever came out. You know, some songs, they kind of take a while. You have to work at them to try to get 'em right, and it can take up to a month or more. But this is one of those ones that just came, and I wrote it in probably about half-an-hour to an hour. I tried to not really think about the words I was saying as much as the feeling I was trying to get across.

— Matt Hires

=== O Sunrise ===
Yeah, that's what we were trying to go for there, and then with the bridge, bring it up, like the sun is rising, like we're coming out of the dark, that was what we were going for when recording that. That's a song that I like a lot.

— Matt Hires

=== You in the End ===
I wrote it with Sara Bareilles, she has that hit "I'm Not Gonna Write You A Love Song." My producer also produced her album, so he had her come into the studio one day for us to play together and see what would happen. We ended up writing "You In The End," and she's a really cool songwriter, I just love the way she writes. Things flow from her in a cool way, very naturally.

— Matt Hires

=== Out of the Dark ===
It's kind of about older relationships, yeah. Before I did the solo thing, I was in a band here in Tampa and we played here for a couple of years. And then I decided to go solo and got signed to the label. There's a certain amount of drama that goes along with that, you know. Being in a band is hard, and breaking up a band is hard because it's like breaking up a relationship. So some of "Out Of The Dark" is about what I was going through in relation to that.

— Matt Hires

=== Hurricane (Demo) ===
We have about five songs that we recorded demos of that didn't make it on to the album. One of these songs that we released on iTunes a month or so ago is called "Hurricane" and it's on that. It's a really cool song, I love it a lot. It may make its way onto an album with a full band version of it somewhere along the way.

— Matt Hires

== Track listing ==
All tracks are written by Matt Hires and Eric Rosse except as noted.

No.	Title	Writer(s)	Length
1.	"Honey, Let Me Sing You a Song"	Hires, Rosse, Gregg Wattenberg	4:08
2.	"State Lines"		2:49
3.	"A Perfect Day"		3:42
4.	"Listen To Me Now"		3:00
5.	"You in the End"	Hires, Rosse, Sara Bareilles	3:59
6.	"Turn The Page"	Hires	3:54
7.	"O Sunrise"		4:08
8.	"Pick Me Up"	Hires, Rosse, Harry Shannon	3:47
9.	"You Are The One"		3:26
10.	"Out of the Dark"	Hires, Rosse, Gus Black	4:07
11.	"Tangled Web"	Hires	4:57
Total length:			41:57

iTunes Deluxe Edition
No.	Title	Writer(s)	Length
12.	"Out of the Dark (Demo)" (iTunes Bonus Track)	Hires, Rosse, Black	3:56
13.	"Hurricane (Demo)" (iTunes Bonus Track)		4:15
14.	"Pick Me Up (Demo)" (iTunes Bonus Track)	Hires, Rosse, Shannon	3:42
15.	"Honey, Let Me Sing You A Song" (Music Video)		4:07
Total length:			53:50

== Reception ==
=== Critical response ===
The album has earned advance critical praise and received generally favorable reviews from most music critics.
People Magazine hailed the collection, noting "on the opening cut of his debut, Hires requests, 'Honey, Let Me Sing You a Song'. With his folky pop and aching croon, how could you deny him?"

Creative Loafing commended the album as "cleverly-crafted and interesting, full of sincerity and catchy melodies highlighted by (Hires') enveloping, gravelly tenor."

On Andrew Leahey's review: "'Take Us to the Start' sounds best at its most brisk, when Hires trades the coffeehouse aspirations of his slower songs for something more akin to driving, mainstream pop/rock. The bulk of this debut album is filled with semi-ballads, though, whose leisurely pace allows Hires more room to indulge a bit too heavily in the influence of his Hotel Café contemporaries."

This Is Modern said: "His debut album is so fully awesome that you will be hard pressed to find a track that you don't enjoy, ...Hires has put together one of the best debut albums by any singer/songwriter and will be rewarded by well deserved recognition and success."

=== Chart performance ===
Take Us to the Start debuted at No. 96 on Billboard 200 albums chart based on only digital download, also charted No. 16 on Billboard Digital Albums.

Chart (2009–2010)	Peak position
U.S. Billboard 200	96
U.S. Digital Albums	16
U.S. Rock Albums	38

== Uses in media ==
Songs from the album have appeared on several TV series and in films. The series Grey's Anatomy used "Out Of The Dark" in the season 6 episode "I Saw What I Saw"; "Turn The Page" appeared in the season five episode "An Honest Mistake", and "O Sunrise" turned up in another episode. NBC's Cougar Town has included the songs "Honey, Let Me Sing You a Song" and "Turn The Page". "Honey" also appeared in the pilot episode of Life Unexpected on The CW, and "O Sunrise" played during the episode "Truth Unrevealed". "A Perfect Day" is heard in the season two episode "Acceptance" of Private Practice, and is used in the trailer for the 2010 film When in Rome. The demo version of "Honey" is featured on the When in Rome's soundtrack album. "Turn The Page" also shows up in the trailer for the 2009 film The Boys Are Back.

== Album credits ==
Performance credits

- Matt Hires – Vocals; Acoustic Guitar; Background Vocals; Crowd Noise; Human Whistle
- Sara Bareilles – Background Vocals
- Matt Chamberlain – Drums
- Chris Chaney – Bass
- Aaron Sterling – Drums
- Chris Reynolds – Percussion

Technical credits

- Stephen Marcussen – Mastering
- Chris Reynolds – Engineer, Digital Editing
- Carolyn Tracey – Package Production
- Kristie Borgmann – Art Manager
- Chris Stang – Marketing

Additional credits

- Reid Rolls – Photography
- Zachariah Mattheus – Art Direction; Design
