= Anna Nalick =

American singer and songwriter

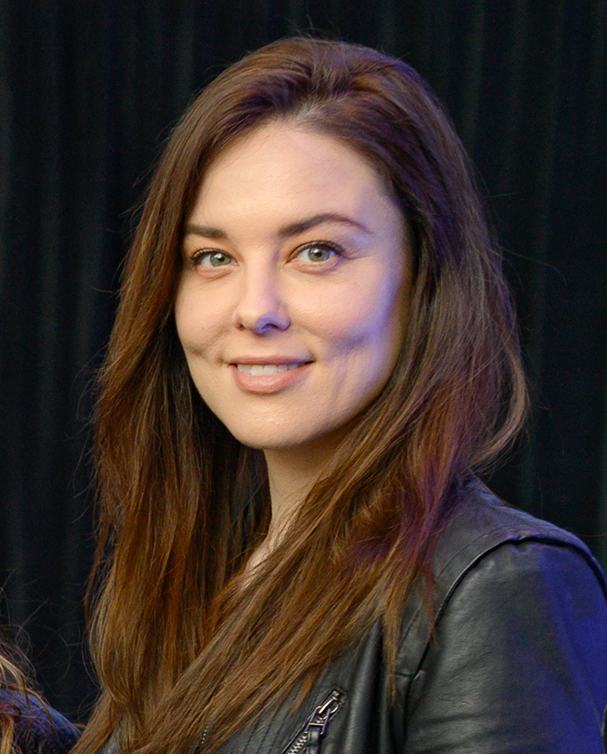
- Nalick in 2020

Background information
- Born: Anna Christine Nalick; March 30, 1984 (age 42); Temple City, California, U.S.
- Origin: Glendora, California, U.S.
- Genres: Pop rock
- Occupation: Singer-songwriter
- Instruments: Vocals; guitar; piano
- Years active: 2003–present
- Labels: Chesky; Columbia; Epic
- Website: Official website

Anna Christine Nalick (/ˈnælɪk/ NAL-ik; born March 30, 1984) is an American singer-songwriter. Her debut album, Wreck of the Day, featuring her first radio hit, "Breathe (2 AM)", was released on April 19, 2005. Nalick left her label under Sony in 2009 after a falling-out surrounding the release of her second album. Nalick's second album, Broken Doll & Odds & Ends, was released on June 5, 2011. On October 19, 2017, Nalick released her third full-length album, At Now. Nalick's fourth album, The Blackest Crow, was released December 6, 2019.

== Early life ==
Nalick was born and raised in Temple City, California, and attended Holy Angels Grammar School in Arcadia before moving to Glendora with her parents at age 14. Nalick's Jewish paternal grandfather and his family came from Kyiv, Ukraine, then part of the Russian Empire, emigrating to the United States to escape the ongoing antisemitic pogroms.

A key memory of her childhood is the fifth grade math class where she would stop paying attention to the teacher, and instead rewrite the lyrics to a Cranberries song. She grew up in a family where two of the grandparents had performed on Broadway, and where her parents exposed her to a number of different artists, including Elvis Presley and Led Zeppelin. Nalick says she draws more inspiration from poetry, literature, psychology, human behavior, and history than anything else. Her musical influences range from ragtime to folk to trip-hop and everything in between.

In another interview, Nalick recalls showing off her talents to her third grade teacher, who then remarked that she'd end up "one day on The Tonight Show with Jay Leno." Nalick did perform in 2005 on The Tonight Show, making sure to invite the teacher to the audience.

Nalick initially decided to go to college before pursuing her dream of music, continuing to record her songs on a Rainbow Brite cassette recorder. But she soon met a photography professor, who had a student with parents in the music business. Nalick agreed to pass along a low-fidelity six-song demo tape, and soon enough, was introduced to Christopher Thorn and Brad Smith, the founding members of Blind Melon now turned production team, as well as Eric Rosse, best known for his production work for Tori Amos. In October 2003, putting her college plans on hold, she signed on with Columbia Records. Nalick went into the studio with Thorn, Smith, and Rosse as producers, together with mix-engineer Mark Endert (Fiona Apple, Maroon 5, and Gavin DeGraw). She recorded with a group of musicians that included Smith on bass, Thorn on guitar, Rosse and Zak Rae on keyboards, Lyle Workman and Stuart Mathis on guitar, and Joey Waronker and Matt Chamberlain on drums. The result was her album Wreck of the Day, released two years later.

== Career ==
=== 2004–2006: Wreck of the Day ===
Nalick's first single from her Wreck of the Day album was "Breathe (2 AM)", which peaked at No. 45 U.S. and went 3× Platinum on the Billboard Hot 100, and went huge on Adult Contemporary and Adult Top 40. It was heavily played on AAA and Hot AC stations across the U.S., along with light airplay on Pop stations, and Nalick became one of 2005's biggest newcomers. Her video for the track got very heavy airplay on VH1 and some MTV airplay as well. At the time of the writing, Wreck of the Day has sold over 615,000 copies with a gold certification from the RIAA, and a No. 20 peak on the Billboard 200. In New Zealand, Wreck of the Day reached the Top 15 albums on the Top 40 Albums Chart.

In November 2005, Nalick released "In the Rough". The single was moderately successful, charting on the Billboard Hot Adult Top 40 Tracks at No. 15. Her album sales only slightly increased after the release of "In the Rough".

Her lead single from Wreck of the Day, "Breathe (2 AM)", experienced a resurgence on worldwide charts following a highly prominent appearance in a Grey's Anatomy episode (As We Know It), aired February 12, 2006. Other episodes of the show have featured the acoustic songs "Catalyst" and "Wreck of the Day" from the same album. The title track has also been featured on the show One Tree Hill.

In 2006, the album was re-released with three new songs and re-recording of the title track. With little promotion, the song only managed to chart on the Adult Top 40 spending two weeks at number 39 and one week at number 40 before falling off the chart.

In a September 2006 Q magazine interview, Britney Spears said she wished she had written Nalick's "Breathe (2 AM)". Two months later, Nalick took honors as "AC Female Artist of the Year" at the New Music Awards, beating out Sheryl Crow. According to her official website, Nalick was so convinced that Crow would win the award that she kicked back and relaxed, removing her shoes. When her name was called, she ran to the stage shoeless to make sure that she was able to have enough time for her acceptance speech.

A clip from the single, "Satellite" from Wreck of the Day is often played on the Satellite Sisters radio show. Wreck of the Day was also featured during Season 2, Episode 20 of the television show Joan of Arcadia.

=== 2007–2009: Separation from Sony ===
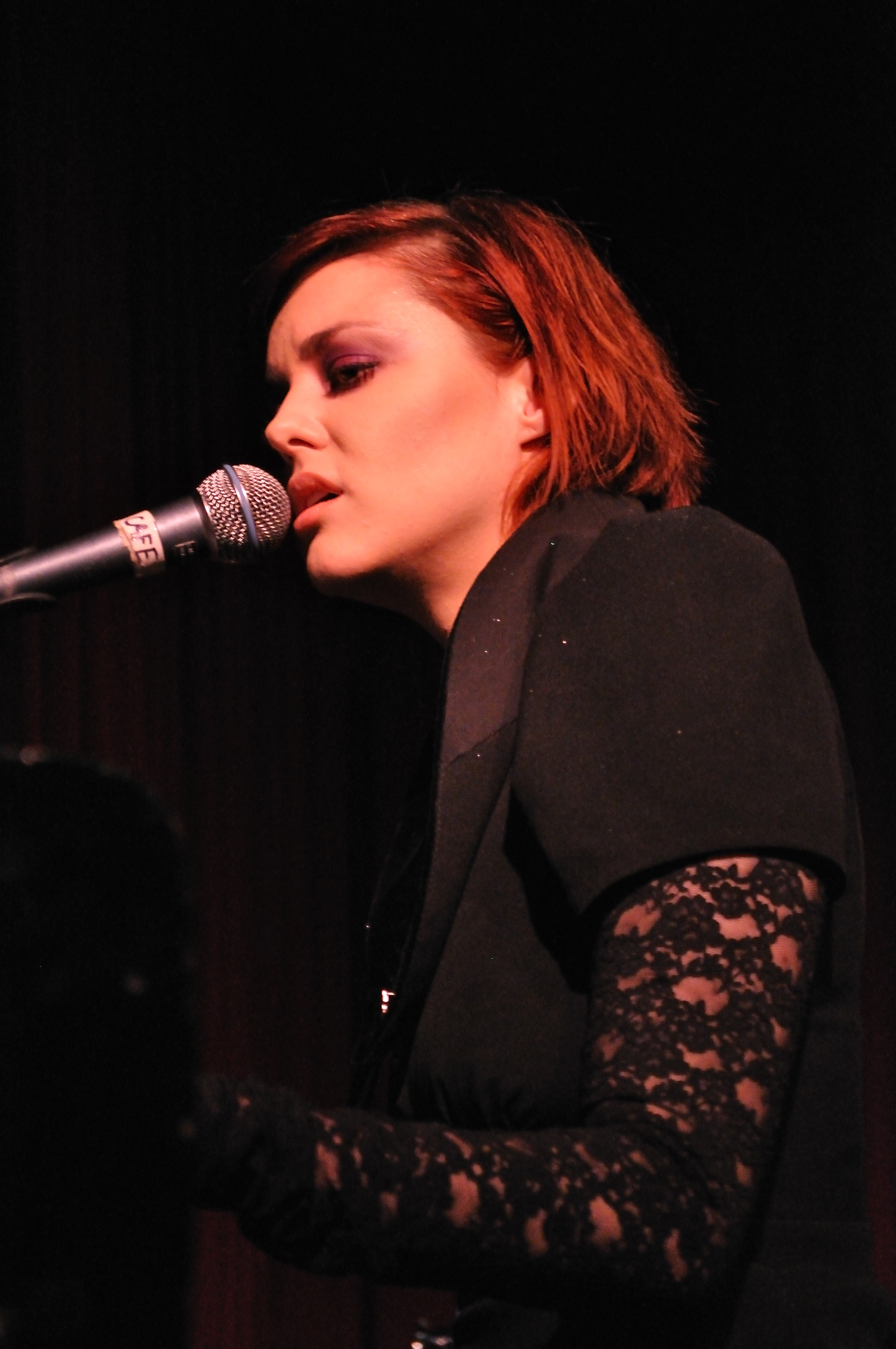
Anna Nalick performing at Hotel Cafe, Hollywood, California, USA on October 5, 2010

On May 11, 2007, the first indication of Nalick writing her second album appeared on her website. Few updates were given after that. The only other song to be released during this "era" was a cover of the song "Band of Gold" on the Desperate Housewives compilation CD.

On January 28, 2008, Nalick premiered her first single off the new EP, Shine, on AOL music's page. The EP "Shine" was released March 25, 2008. It featured the title single, a cover of Red Hot Chili Peppers's song "Breaking the Girl", and acoustic renditions of Nalick's best-known tracks.

On July 12, 2008, it was reported that Broken Doll was to be the title of Nalick's second album. The album was originally scheduled for release in the summer of 2008; however, a falling-out with Epic Records resulted in the album being scrapped. Little was heard from Nalick until the summer of 2010.

=== 2010–2018: Independent artist ===
In August 2010, Nalick made a comeback announcement on her Facebook profile, accompanied by new photographs revealing a bold new look; it was revealed that she had left Sony in 2009 to be a free agent. At the time, she was making a record with producer Nathan Chapman (Taylor Swift, Jewel), with an expected release date in 2011. On August 25, 2010, Nalick premiered a new song, "The Lullaby Singer", on her official website. Nalick held five live performances—Hotel Café in Hollywood, California, for August 31, September 21, September 28, and October 5, 2010, and 3rd & Lindsley in Nashville, Tennessee, for September 9, 2010—to accompany the comeback announcement.

On March 2, 2011, Nalick announced on her Facebook page the official name for the first upcoming album: Broken Doll & Odds & Ends, a little variation from the one she announced before. It had been set for release in May 2011, but several unforeseen difficulties resulted in delays. Broken Doll & Odds & Ends was released on iTunes on June 5, 2011, with physical CD release available from her website, and sold at shows.

Nalick performed on Good Day Sacramento, singing "Walk Away" in honor of the people who died in the September 11 attacks.

In 2011 Nalick began studying acting and creative writing at UCLA. She attempted co-writing for other artists in 2012, an experience she has stated gave her "devil horns and PTSD". She has been touring since 2013. In between she has been writing and arranging new material. She began producing a new album in 2014 and is looking for a record label to help publish it, although she is also considering an independent release.

In October 2015, Nalick started to solicit contributions on PledgeMusic to release her new album. On October 18, 2017, Nalick released her third full-length album At Now to her PledgeMusic supporters as an early release. The official release date for this album was October 19, 2017, the same day she began a two-week tour to promote her new album. During 2018, Nalick collaborated with Justin Levinson on a new single titled "A Part of Me".

=== 2019–present: The Blackest Crow ===
In 2019, Nalick signed with Chesky Records, and released The Blackest Crow on December 6. The album is a collection of covers spanning works from the 1940s to the 1990s, recorded in a single day in a decommissioned church in Brooklyn, New York.

== Discography ==
=== Studio albums ===
| Title | Album details | Peak chart positions | | Certifications (sales threshold) |
| Title | Album details | US | NZ | Certifications (sales threshold) |
|---|---|---|---|---|
| Wreck of the Day | Released: April 19, 2005; Label: Columbia | 20 | 14 | RIAA: Gold |
| Broken Doll & Odds & Ends | Released: June 5, 2011; Label: Nyctograph | — | — | |
| At Now | Released: October 19, 2017; Label: Nyctograph | — | — | |
| The Blackest Crow | Released: December 6, 2019; Label: Chesky | — | — | |

=== EPs ===
| Title | EP details |
|---|---|
| Shine | Released: March 25, 2008; Label: Epic |

=== Singles ===
| Year | Single | Peak chart positions | | | | | | Certifications | Album |
| Year | Single | US | US Pop | US AC | US Adult Pop | AUS | NZ | Certifications | Album |
|---|---|---|---|---|---|---|---|---|---|
| 2004 | "Breathe (2 AM)" | 45 | 22 | 4 | 6 | 79 | 37 | RIAA: Gold; MC: Gold; RMNZ: Gold | Wreck of the Day |
| 2005 | "In the Rough" | — | — | — | 15 | — | — | | Wreck of the Day |
| 2006 | "Wreck of the Day" | — | — | — | 39 | — | — | | Wreck of the Day |
| 2008 | "Shine" | — | — | — | 30 | — | — | | Shine |
| 2017 | "Till the End of the Year (Bye Buy By)" | — | — | — | — | — | — | | Non-album single |
| 2015 | "Aura" | — | — | — | — | — | — | | At Now |
| 2017 | "At Now" | — | — | — | — | — | — | | At Now |
"—" denotes releases that did not chart

== Awards and nominations ==
| Year | Awards | Work | Category | Result |
|---|---|---|---|---|
| 2006 | Teen Choice Awards | Herself | Choice Music: Breakout Artist - Female | Nominated |
| 2006 | New Music Awards | Herself | AC Female Artist of the Year | Won |
| 2007 | ASCAP Pop Music Awards | "Breathe (2 AM)" | Most Performed Song | Won |
| 2007 | Groovevolt Music and Fashion Awards | "Breathe (2 AM)" | Best Pop Song Performance - Female | Nominated |
