= F-Stop Music =

- Parent company: Atlantic Records
- Genre: Indie, rock, soul, folk
- Country of origin: United States
- Location: New York City
- Official website: http://www.fstopmusic.com/

F-Stop Music is a subsidiary of Atlantic Records. Singer-songwriter and Tampa native, Matt Hires, was the first artist to sign with F-Stop. Soon after, Jonathan Tyler and the Northern Lights joined F-Stop, bringing their soul-infused rock to the label.

== Artists ==
- Jonathan Tyler and the Northern Lights
- Matt Hires
- Brett Dennen
