= A to B (EP) =

EP by Matt Hires
- Released: August 17, 2010
- Recorded: 2009–2010
- Genres: Rock, pop
- Length: 15:16
- Label: Atlantic
- Producer: Eric Rosse

Matt Hires chronology
Take Us to the Start (2009)	A to B (2010)	Live Sessions EP

A to B is a 4-track EP by American pop-rock singer-songwriter Matt Hires, released on August 17, 2010. The Ep includes the original album version of "Honey Let Me Sing You a Song" – first found on the Tampa-based tunesmith's acclaimed 2009 debut, "Take Us to the Start", it also features 2 new songs "A To B", "Rock N' Roll Heart" and a new recording of "Honey, Let Me Sing You a Song (Alternate Version)". The EP was released exclusively through digital service.

== Background ==
The Ep was recorded during the State Lines Tour 2009–2010.

=== Concept ===
I’m trying to figure out what I want my next record to sound like. I’m a fan of bands that create each of their records with a sound or feel that is specific to each one, while the heart of the records remains the same or similar. If that makes any sense… In other words, I want to make a record that doesn't sound the same as Take Us to the Start, while the heart of it still sounds like Matt Hires.

— Matt Hires,

The EP is a little more stripped down. The next album will be more full band stuff. "A to B" and "Rock N' Roll Heart" are the new songs on the EP. Those will be on the next record for sure, but different versions. We just took couple days in the studio for the EP and we approached the songs a little differently. We started "A to B" with an acoustic track and we didn't put too much on it. I'm really happy with how that one turned out. It may be one of my favorite songs that I've ever recorded. I feel like the sound really helps the song come across well.

— Matt Hires,

=== Song rework ===
It was my producer's idea to do the driving cello and the acoustic on the song. We released an acoustic version of the song last year, and this take is similar to that with strings on it. The guitars are a little more driving on the new version. It's cool! I think this is actually the fourth version of this song that I've released [Laughs]. It may be my favorite version though. I think there's something about it that really captures what the song is saying.

— Matt Hires,

== Reception ==
=== Critical response ===
The EP has received positive review from music critics.

The Album Project "Matt Hires knows how to throw down a catchy tune and more new songs are always good. The new songs have a similar feel to his recent debut album, though this time it’s pretty much just Matt with an acoustic guitar going for it. I like the 2 new songs, but if you’re only looking to spend a buck, I’d spend it on "A to B"

"A To B is an EP that's fun as it is deep, and Hires manages to say a lot with just a few tracks. Isn't that the best way to do it though?" -Artist Direct

== Track listing ==
A to B

#	Title
1.	"Honey, Let Me Sing You A Song (Alternate Version)" – 4:03
2.	"A To B" – 3:17
3.	"Rock N' Roll Heart" – 3:48
4.	"Honey, Let Me Sing You A Song (Album Version)" – 4:08
