= Broken Doll & Odds & Ends =

Studio album by Anna Nalick
- Released: June 5, 2011
- Genre: Pop rock, acoustic
- Length: 38:23
- Label: Nyctograph Records
- Producer: Chris Rondinella, Anna Nalick

Anna Nalick chronology
Shine (2008)	Broken Doll & Odds & Ends (2011)	At Now (2017)

Broken Doll & Odds & Ends is the second studio album by singer-songwriter Anna Nalick, released on June 5, 2011. The original version of "Shine" was released three years earlier on her EP Shine, although it has been re-worked for this album. It was intended to be the lead for her initially planned second album, but the plans fell through after a dispute with her label. After Nalick separated from her label, she got married and took a two year break from the music industry. In 2010, Nalick announced her return to the music business on her Facebook page. She formed her own independent label, Nyctograph, and released Broken Doll & Odds & Ends. The title track of the album, "Broken Doll", was developed after she found her old Barbie dolls discarded and broken. The song develops this as a theme of once feeling special, but then being left behind. The song was written early in the process, when Nalick was still under contract with Sony Music. One of the themes the album explores is the discomfort Nalick felt at being asked to be somebody different than herself. Initially, the album was intended to be an acoustic album, but Nalick's friends who performed on the album had talent with many instruments, so that she gave them the opportunity to explore a variety of sounds to put on the album, so that various instruments like the sitar, the mandocello, and the glockenspiel ended up on the album.

== Track listing ==
All tracks are written by Anna Nalick except where noted

No.	Title	Writer(s)	Length
1.	"Broken Doll"		3:28
2.	"Car Crash"		3:46
3.	"Kiss Them for Me"	Susan Ballion, Peter Edward Clarke, Martin McCarrick, Steven Severin	4:05
4.	"Walk Away"		4:33
5.	"Sort of Delilah"		3:36
6.	"Scars"		3:49
7.	"These Old Wings"		4:11
8.	"Shine"		3:31
9.	"The Fairest of the Seasons"	Jackson Browne, Gregory Copeland	4:05
10.	"All on My Own"		3:19
Total length:			38:23

== Personnel ==
Musicians

- Anna Nalick – vocals
- Luis Maldonado – electric guitar, acoustic guitar, sitar
- William Gramling – keyboard, piano, Wurlitzer, glockenspiel, toy piano, string arrangement for "Shine"
- Ben Peeler – lap steel, oud, bouzouki, mandolin, mandocello, electric guitar
- Jonathan Byram – string arrangement for "Sort of Delilah"
- Ian Walker – electric bass, upright bass
- Alexander Granger – violin
- Ana Lenchantin – cello, cello arrangement for "Kiss Them for Me"
- Luke Fisher – percussion
- Aaron Redfield – drums
- Andrew Perusi – bass
- Phillip Glenn – violin
- Larry Briner – cello
- Tyler Chester – bass
- Alex Wen – viola

Production

- Diane Birch – producer
- Chris Rondinella – producer, engineer (at Heritage Recording Co.), mixing for "Broken Doll"
- Darrell Thorp – mixing
- Gavin Lurssen – mastering
