= God (Tori Amos song) =

1994 single by Tori Amos

- US CD maxi-single

Single by Tori Amos

from the album Under the Pink
- B-side: "Home on the Range" (Cherokee edition); Piano Suite: "All the Girls Hate Her" / "Over It"; "Sister Janet"
- Released: February 3, 1994
- Studio: The Fishhouse (Taos, New Mexico)
- Genre: Pop
- Length: 3:58
- Label: Atlantic; EastWest
- Songwriter: Tori Amos
- Producers: Tori Amos; Eric Rosse

Tori Amos singles chronology
"Cornflake Girl" (1994)	"God" (1994)	"Pretty Good Year" (1994)

Music video
- "God" on YouTube

"God" is a song by American singer-songwriter and pianist Tori Amos, released by Atlantic and East West Records as a single from her second studio album, Under the Pink (1994). It was issued as the album's lead single in the United States on February 3, 1994, as the second single in Australia on May 2, and as the fourth single in the United Kingdom on October 3. The song reached number 44 on the UK singles chart as well as number one on the US Billboard Modern Rock Tracks chart. It became Amos's first single to chart on the Billboard Hot 100, peaking at number 72. Its music video was directed by Melodie McDaniel, featuring scenes of Amos dancing with a plethora of brown rats.

== Releases ==
The B-sides to the American release include Tori Amos' reworking of "Home on the Range" with new lyrics as well as a two-song instrumental piano suite. An American cassette single includes the B-side "Sister Janet". A different single was released in Europe on CD, 12 in (300 mm) vinyl, 7 in (180 mm) vinyl, and cassette. The 7 in (180 mm) single is a glossy, dual-sided picture disc. The various formats include ambient and jungle house remixes of the track by CJ Bolland, Carl Craig, and the Joy.

== Critical reception ==
Upon the release, Larry Flick from Billboard magazine wrote, "First single from the upcoming Under the Pink lays her distinctive soprano, which will likely continue to draw comparisons to Kate Bush, over a textured pop shuffle beat. Easily Amos' most radio-friendly single to date, look for initial activity at alternative and open-minded album rock radio stations. Given the right amount of promotional TLC, track could make the big cross into top 40 territory." Alan Jones from Music Week commented, "This delight from Tori's second album is fine in its original version, but is transformed into a dance track. The Joy's mix is minimal, CJ Bolland's is deliciously ambient, while Carl Craig wins the prize for a nervy, almost tribally percussive mix." In 2014 and 2023, Stereogum and The Guardian both named "God" as Amos's third-greatest song.

== Music video ==
The accompanying music video for "God" directed by American photographer and film director Melodie McDaniel features Amos in a variety of religiously-themed situations, such as a scene visually comparing a tefillin used by a rabbi with a basketball player using a belt while injecting drugs. The video is often remembered for scenes of Amos singing in front of a lit candle, dancing with a plethora of brown rats (possibly at the Rat temple); this was commented on in an episode of the television show Beavis and Butt-head, and parodying a snake cult.

== Track listings ==
- US maxi-CD single; Australian CD and cassette single
1. "God" (LP version) – 3:55
2. "Home on the Range" (Cherokee edition) – 5:25
3. Piano Suite: "All the Girls Hate Her" – 2:23
4. Piano Suite: "Over It" – 2:11
- US cassette single
1. "God" (LP version) – 3:55
2. "Sister Janet" – 4:01
- UK and European CD single
1. "God" – 3:55
2. "God" (The Dharma Kayã mix) – 12:34
3. "God" (The Rainforest Resort mix) – 10:32
4. "God" (The Thinking mix 2) – 9:50
- UK 12-inch single
1. "God" (The Thinking mix 2) – 12:34
2. "God" (a cappella vocal and Rain mix) – 4:50
3. "God" (The Rainforest Resort mix) – 10:32
4. "God" (The CJ Bolland mix) – 5:54
- UK 7-inch picture disc and cassette single
1. "God" – 3:55
2. "God" (a cappella vocal and Rain mix) – 4:50

== Credits and personnel ==
Credits are adapted from the Under the Pink album booklet.

Studios

- Recorded at The Fishhouse (Taos, New Mexico)
- Mixed at Olympic Studios (London, England)
- Mastered at Gateway Mastering (Portland, Maine, US)

Personnel

- Tori Amos – writing, vocals, piano, production
- Steve Caton – guitars
- George Porter Jr. – bass
- Carlo Nuccio – drums
- Paulinho da Costa – percussion
- Eric Rosse – production, recording (guitars, other instruments), programming
- John Beverly Jones – recording (vocals, piano, percussion)
- Paul McKenna – recording (bass, drums)
- Kevin Killen – mixing
- Bob Ludwig – mastering

== Charts ==
=== Weekly charts ===
Chart (1994)	Peak position
Australia (ARIA)	65
Canada Top Singles (RPM)	87
Scottish Singles Sales (Official Charts)	41
UK Singles (Official Charts)	44
UK Airplay (Music Week)	28
UK Club Chart (Music Week)	43
US Billboard Hot 100	72
US Alternative Airplay (Billboard)	1

=== Year-end charts ===
Chart (1994)	Position
US Modern Rock Tracks (Billboard)	15

== Release history ==
Region	Date	Format(s)	Label(s)	Ref(s).
United States	January 10–11, 1994	Alternative; college; album alternative; adult contemporary; pop radio	Atlantic	
United States	February 3, 1994	CD; cassette	Atlantic	
Australia	May 2, 1994	CD; cassette	EastWest	
United Kingdom	October 3, 1994	12-inch vinyl; CD; cassette	EastWest	
