= Jason Castro (album) =

Studio album by Jason Castro
- Released: April 13, 2010
- Recorded: 2009–2010
- Genre: Pop; reggae
- Label: Atlantic
- Producer: Gregg Wattenberg; Eric Rosse

Jason Castro chronology
The Love Uncompromised EP (2010)	Jason Castro (2010)	Who I Am (2010)

Singles from Jason Castro
- 1. "Let's Just Fall in Love Again" Released: August 18, 2009; 2. "That's What I'm Here For" Released: January 2010

Jason Castro is the self-titled debut studio album recorded by Jason Castro. The album was released on April 13, 2010.

== Background ==
On April 12, 2009, Jason signed to Atlantic Records, and released his first official single, "Let's Just Fall in Love Again," which peaked at number 113 on Billboard Hot 100 and number 94 on the Pop 100 chart. "Hallelujah" and "Over the Rainbow" were chosen because he sang them on American Idol.

To promote the album, he toured through the Philippines, Malaysia, and Singapore with Matt Hires and Caitlin Crosby. He also toured with Camera Can't Lie and his younger brother Michael. Jason also used two of his singles, "Over the Rainbow" and "That's What I'm Here For," for the wedding of The Bachelor stars Jason Mesnick and Molly Malaney, which aired on February 27, 2010.

In the eighth season of Idol, Castro's younger brother Michael auditioned for the show and passed through to the Hollywood Round. However, he failed to advance to the Top 36.

== Reception ==
Professional ratings
Review scores
Source	Rating
Allmusic	3/5 stars
About.com	3.5/5 stars
Entertainment Weekly	B+
Dallas News	B

=== Critical reception ===
Andrew Leahey of Allmusic gave the album 3 stars out of 5, pointing out his "spaced out goofiness." Michael Slezak of Entertainment Weekly gave the album a B+, calling the album "worth springing for."

=== Commercial performance ===
The album debuted at number eighteen on the Billboard 200 albums chart with a first week sales of 20,000, and also peaked at number nine on the Top Digital Albums chart. The album has sold over 34,000 copies as of May 12, 2010.

== Track listing ==
=== Standard edition ===
1. "Let's Just Fall in Love Again" (Sean McConnell)
2. "This Heart of Mine" (Jason Castro, Jason Rene, Roberge, Marc Andrew, Wattenberg, Gregg Steven, Manigly, Shawn)
3. "That's What I'm Here For" (Castro, Amund Bjoerklund, Espen Lind, Zachary, David Maloy)
4. "Love Uncompromised"
5. "Closer"
6. "You Can Always Come Home"(featuring Serena Ryder) (Steven Fiore)
7. "It Matters to Me" (Castro, Kenney)
8. "Hallelujah" (Leonard Cohen)

=== Amazon.com deluxe track listing ===
1. "Let's Just Fall in Love Again" (Sean McConnell)
2. "This Heart of Mine" (Jason Castro, Jason Rene, Roberge, Marc Andrew, Wattenberg, Gregg Steven, Manigly, Shawn)
3. "That's What I'm Here For" (Castro, Amund Bjoerklund, Espen Lind, Zachary, David Maloy)
4. "Heart of Stone" (Castro, Bjorlund, Bobby Huff, Lind)
5. "If I Were You"
6. "You Can Always Come Home" (Featuring Serena Ryder) (Steven Fiore)
7. "Love Uncompromised"
8. "Closer"
9. "All Wrapped Up"
10. "It Matters to Me" (Castro, Kenney)
11. "Hallelujah"
12. "Let's Just Fall in Love Again" (Acoustic Version) (Sean McConnell)
13. "Sweet Medicine" (Castro)
14. "Over the Rainbow" (E.Y. "Yip" Harburg, Harold Arlen)

== Charts ==
=== Weekly charts ===
Chart (2010)	Peak position
US Billboard 200	18
US Digital Albums (Billboard)	7

=== Singles ===
Year	Single	Peak	
Year	Single	US Bub.	US Heat
2009	"Let's Just Fall in Love Again"	1	15
2010	"That's What I'm Here For"	21	17
2010	"Over the Rainbow"	—	—
"—" denotes releases that did not chart

== Certifications ==
Region	Certification	Certified units/sales
United States	—	34,000
