= Jonathan Tyler and the Northern Lights =

American rock band

Jonathan Tyler
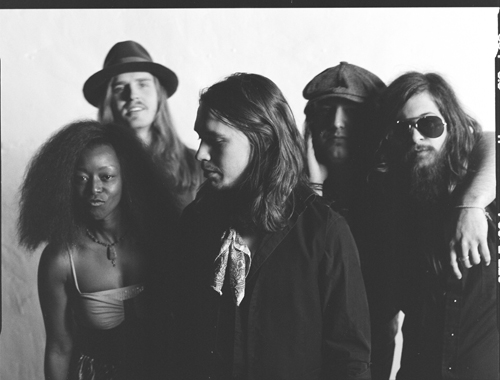
- The band in June 2009

Background information
- Origin: Dallas, Texas, United States
- Genres: Hard rock, blues rock
- Years active: 2007–present
- Labels: F-Stop Music, Atlantic
- Members: Jonathan Tyler; Brandon Pinckard; Jordan Cain; Emotion Brown; Chase McGillis
- Past members: Nick Jay
- Website: jonathantylermusic.com

Jonathan Tyler is an American rock band from Dallas, Texas.

== History ==
The band was formed in January 2007 in Dallas, Texas by Jonathan Tyler, Brandon Pinckard, along with Oklahoma natives Nick Jay, and Jordan Cain. The band immediately went into the studio with local producer Chris Bell to record their first independent record Hot Trottin'. After playing nearly every venue in Deep Ellum the band began to venture outside of Dallas into Austin, Houston, and other surrounding cities. Emotion Brown joined the band in May 2007.

By 2008, the band began garnering regional and national attention by supporting major national acts including Erykah Badu, Leon Russell, Deep Purple, The Black Crowes, Kool & the Gang, Chicago, Heart, Cross Canadian Ragweed, among others. The band was discovered at SXSW 2008 by an A&R representative from Atlantic Records, and was soon signed to F-Stop Music/Atlantic Records. The band was awarded "Best Blues Act" by the 2008 Dallas Observer Music Awards.

In 2009, JTNL continued touring extensively across the United States, most notably alongside Lynyrd Skynyrd, Kid Rock, O.A.R., & AC/DC. The band also played the Austin City Limits Music Festival, Forecastle Festival, Summerfest, Wakarusa, and SXSW. In August, JTNL recorded their first album Pardon Me for F-Stop Music/Atlantic Records. Jay Joyce was selected by the band to produce the record from his Nashville studio. The band was awarded "Best Group", "Best Male Vocalist", and "Best Blues Act" by the 2009 Dallas Observer Music Awards. Rave reviews from outlets across the country began pouring in for the band and their live show, including praise from critics in USA Today, American Songwriter, Chicago Sun Times, Orlando Weekly, Austin American Statesman, Arizona Daily Star, Urban Tulsa Weekly, and Nuvo Weekly (Indianapolis) among numerous others.

On April 27, 2010, Pardon Me was released nationwide. It was awarded "Reader's Pick Best Local CD Release" in the Dallas Observer, the "fourth best release of 2010" by the Dallas Morning News, and received favorable reviews nationwide.

In 2010, JTNL most notably toured alongside ZZ Top, JJ Grey & MOFRO, American Bang, Robert Randolph and the Family Band, and others. They played Bonnaroo Music Festival, Voodoo Fest, Summerfest, BamaJam, and SXSW.

Blender Magazine exclusively debuted the video for "Gypsy Woman" November 15, 2010 on Blender.com.

The band was named "Top Artist of 2010" by Pegasus News.

Jonathan Tyler was named "Best Male Vocalist" by the 2010 Dallas Observer Music Awards.

JTNL was named "Pick of the Week" in USA Today on May 5, 2010.

== Television and film appearances ==
- "Devil's Basement" was featured on the trailer for the HBO series Boardwalk Empire.
- "Hot Sake" was featured in episode 11 of the Fox television series The Good Guys.
- "Pardon Me" was featured on the premier of the NBC series Friday Night Lights.
- "Young & Free" was used throughout the 2010 ESPN College Football season, and throughout 2010 on the Fox Sports channel.
- The band performed "Pardon Me" on the ABC television program Jimmy Kimmel Live! on April 8, 2010. They also performed it during an appearance on The Gordon Keith Show in Dallas.
- The band performed "Gypsy Woman" on the WGN Midday News on WGN-TV Chicago and WGN America on December 14, 2010.
- The group's version of "Sugar, Sugar" was picked up in Fall 2011 as the theme to the TLC series Cake Boss, replacing a prior version of the song sung by The Nerds.

== Discography ==
=== Studio albums ===
- Hot Trottin' (2007) – Independent release
- Pardon Me (2010) – F-Stop Music/Atlantic Records
- Holy Smokes (2015) – Timeless Echo/Thirty Tigers

=== Singles ===
| Year | Single | Peak positions | | Album |
| Year | Single | US Main. | US Rock | Album |
|---|---|---|---|---|
| 2010 | "Pardon Me" | — | — | Pardon Me |
| 2010 | "Gypsy Woman" | 27 | 49 | Pardon Me |
