= Honey, Let Me Sing You a Song =

Single by Matt Hires

from the album Take Us to the Start
- Released: June 30, 2009
- Genre: Pop
- Length: 4:08 (album version); 3:57 (demo version); 4:03 (alternate version); 4:02 (live sessions version)
- Label: Atlantic
- Songwriter(s): Matt Hires, Eric Rosse, Gregg Wattenberg
- Producer(s): Eric Rosse

Matt Hires singles chronology
"Honey, Let Me Sing You a Song" (2009)	"A to B" (2010)

"Honey, Let Me Sing You a Song" is a song by American pop-rock singer-songwriter Matt Hires from his first full-length studio album Take Us to the Start, the song featured in many uses in media, including ABC's hit show Cougar Town and Life Unexpected on The CW.

The demo version featured in the soundtrack album of 2010 Touchstone Pictures release, When in Rome and 2008 release Live From the Hotel Café EP.

Matt has recorded an alternate version of "Honey, Let Me Sing You a Song", which featured on his 2010 release A to B EP.

A live version of "Honey, Let Me Sing You a Song" features on his 2011 release Live Sessions EP.

== Background ==
According to an interview with Mike Ragogna, Matt said the song was written for his wife Rachel.

It was actually the first song that I wrote for her (his wife Rachel). We'd been friends for a while, and that's what the song's about. I never really saw the things that I started to see in her until I started becoming attracted to her.

— Matt Hires,

I started writing songs after my first real girlfriend broke up with me. I wrote one song that maybe wasn't necessarily the nicest, this song about a girl I was dating at the time who I had been friends with for a long time, but had a slow attraction that blossomed through that. That's what the song is about.

— Matt Hires,

== Music video concept ==
Matt singing in a music instruments store in the video "Honey, Let Me Sing You a Song"

I had a day off in New York City, and we went down to the coast of New Jersey and just filmed the video in like half-a-day. I'm really happy with how it turned out. I'm very picky about music videos. I don't like most music videos. "Honey" is actually the only one I've done so far. It wasn't a concept I'd come up with but for the next videos, I'll try to come up with cool concepts. Some of my favorite music videos are really simple. The video for Coldplay's "Yellow" is just Chris Martin walking along the beach singing the song, and the sun rises. To me, there's something really cool about that video even though it's extremely simple. I'd like to try some stuff like that for future videos

— Matt Hires,

== Reception ==
=== Critical response ===
The song has received generally favorable reviews from music critics.
"The album’s song, “Honey, Let Me Sing You A Song," begins quietly then bursts into the chorus as Hires begs his lady not to run away, to listen to his words (as they come out wrong). It's sweeping and expressive, but – as cute as Hires is – watching the completely unrelated music video kinda warps the experience." —Creative Loafing

"The lead off track is “Honey, Let Me Sing You A Song," which Hires gave us a little taste of in the form of an acoustic demo on his "Live From The Hotel Cafe" EP. This is the song that will make him a household name, and should be all over the radio and at the top of the charts in no time at all." —This Is Modern

"...Hires requests, “Honey, Let Me Sing You a Song". With his folky pop and aching croon, how could you deny him?" —People Magazine

== Versions ==
from "Take Us to the Start"

#	Title
1.	"Honey, Let Me Sing You a Song (Album Version)" 4:08

from "Live From the Hotel Café EP" / "When In Rome OST"

#	Title
1.	"Honey, Let Me Sing You a Song (Demo Version)" 3:57

from "A to B EP"

#	Title
1.	"Honey, Let Me Sing You a Song (Alternate Version)" 4:03

from "Live Sessions EP"

#	Title
1.	"Honey, Let Me Sing You a Song (Live Sessions Version)" 4:02
