= Past the Mission =

1994 single by Tori Amos

- Standard cover art for most editions

Single by Tori Amos

from the album Under the Pink
- B-side: "Black Swan"
- Released: May 16, 1994
- Studio: The Fishhouse (Taos, New Mexico)
- Genre: Pop
- Length: 4:05
- Label: Atlantic; EastWest
- Songwriter: Tori Amos
- Producer: Tori Amos

Tori Amos singles chronology
"Pretty Good Year" (1994)	"Past the Mission" (1994)	"Caught a Lite Sneeze" (1996)

Music video
- "Past the Mission" on YouTube

"Past the Mission" is a song by American singer-songwriter and pianist Tori Amos. It was released as the third single from her second studio album, Under the Pink (1994), in Europe, Australia, the United Kingdom, and the United States. "Past the Mission" was issued in May 1994 by EastWest Records in the UK, in July 1994 in Australia, and in September 1994 by Atlantic Records in the U.S. Two different CD singles containing live B-sides were released in the UK, and the second of these was released in continental Europe and Australia. In the US, the single was only released commercially on cassette, although a promotional CD single was produced.

== Background ==
Regarding the origins of the song, Amos commented:

"Past the Mission" refers to a personal experience with sexual violence, which I had a song about on Little Earthquakes also. So, the remark 'I once knew a hot girl' is painful. Where’s she gone? On this record there are songs about the healing from that experience, like "Baker Baker" ('Make me whole again'), "Past the Mission", "Yes, Anastasia". The idea is to rescue myself from the role of a victim. That I have a choice left. Though I can't change what has happened, I can choose how to react. And I don't want to spend the rest of my life being bitter and locked up. That’s also the thought behind the phrase 'past the mission/I smell the roses'.

Trent Reznor, founder of the industrial rock group Nine Inch Nails, sings background vocals on this track. An alternate mix of "Past the Mission" appears on Amos's compilation box set A Piano: The Collection (2006).

== Critical reception ==
Larry Flick from Billboard magazine wrote, "Amos is an acquired taste that many are wisely beginning to indulge in. This haunting, piano-rooted tune gives her plenty of room to stretch her unique vocal style. Pleasing chord progressions have a sort of country-pop quality, which fits her piercing soprano quite nicely. Far more sophisticated than standard top 40 fare, but well worth the programming effort."

== Chart performance ==
"Past the Mission" reached the top 40 in both the UK and Ireland, but it failed to chart on the US Hot 100 and peaked outside the top 100 in Australia.

== Music video ==
The accompanying music video for "Past the Mission" begins with Amos holding hands with two young women, walking along a dirt road. As the three begin walking through a town named Arcos de la Frontera, Spain, other women join them in their march until there is a large parade as the men look on. The women are eventually confronted by a male priest, who blocks their pathway. One by one the women move to the ground, laying flat as the priest walks around and steps over them. The priest is then joined by the rest of the men, who all walk away as the women stand up and continue their march, eventually finding themselves in the open field seen at the beginning of the video. The video ends with a young boy running to catch up with the ever advancing parade of women.

== Track listings ==
The UK CD single set was sold in two parts. The non-limited part (CD 2) comes in a slim jewel case and the disc features a photo-negative image of Amos playing a piano. The limited edition (CD 1) comes in a triple gatefold digipak case with two slots to house each CD in the set. In place of the second disc there is a cardboard cutout that looks like the CD. The owner can replace the cutout with the actual CD from the other half of the set. The second CD was also released in Germany and looks nearly identical excepting that the image on the disc is a positive image, not photo-negative.

- UK 7-inch single – EastWest A7257
- UK cassette single / Australian cassette single – EastWest A7257C
1. "Past the Mission" (Album version) – 4:05
2. "Past the Mission" (Live) – 4:21
- UK CD 1 (Limited Edition) – EastWest A7257CDX
1. "Upside Down" (Live) – 5:57
2. "Past the Mission" (Live) – 4:21
3. "Icicle" (Live) – 7:50
4. "Flying Dutchman" (Live) – 6:31
- UK CD 2 / European CD / Australian CD – EastWest A7257CD
1. "Past the Mission" (Album version) – 4:05
2. "Winter" (Live) – 6:37
3. "The Waitress" (Live) – 3:29
4. "Here. In My Head" (Live) – 6:05
- US cassette single – Atlantic 4-87206
1. "Past the Mission" (Album version) – 4:05
2. "Black Swan" – 4:04

== Charts ==
Chart (1994)	Peak position
Australia (ARIA)	116
Europe (Eurochart Hot 100)	68
Ireland (IRMA)	25
UK Singles (Official Charts)	31

== Release history ==
Region	Date	Format(s)	Label(s)	Ref.
United Kingdom	May 16, 1994	7-inch vinyl; CD1; cassette	EastWest	
United Kingdom	May 23, 1994	CD2	EastWest	
Australia	July 4, 1994	CD; cassette	EastWest	
United States	September 27, 1994	Cassette	Atlantic	
