= Jason Castro (singer) =

American singer

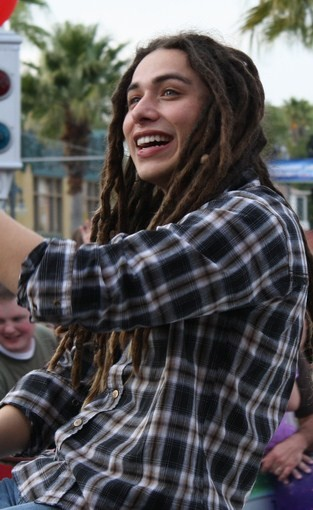
- Castro in the American Idol Experience motorcade at Walt Disney World

Background information
- Born: Jason René Castro; March 25, 1987 (age 39); Dallas, Texas, United States
- Origin: Rowlett, Texas
- Genres: Acoustic, pop
- Occupations: Singer, songwriter, real estate agent
- Instruments: Vocals, guitar
- Years active: 2007–present
- Labels: Atlantic, Word
- Formerly of: Keeping Lions/Charlemagne, The Heavy Steadies, Castro

Jason René Castro (born March 25, 1987) is an American acoustic/folk-pop singer, songwriter, and real estate agent. He was the fourth place finalist on season seven of American Idol. After Idol, he signed a recording contract with Atlantic Records, and his self-titled debut album was released on April 13, 2010.

== Early years ==
Castro was born in Dallas, Texas, and raised in Rowlett, Texas. His parents, René and Betsy Castro, are Colombian and also had two other children, Michael and Jackie. Their father, René, is an architectural swimming pool designer.

He attended Rowlett High School where he was a left winger on his school's soccer team and an honor student. He received a 1340 out of 1600 on his SAT. Castro was a junior majoring in Construction Science at Texas A&M University in College Station on a full academic scholarship when he auditioned for American Idol.

Castro has sported dreadlocks since his senior year of high school. In 2014, symbolic of a spiritual reawakening, he cut his dreadlocks and has since worn his hair much shorter.

Castro performed as a drummer with the rock band Charlemagne, which later became Keeping Lions. He has stated that his musical influences include Ray LaMontagne, Ben Harper, Bob Marley, Carlos Vives and Kirk Baxley.

== American Idol ==
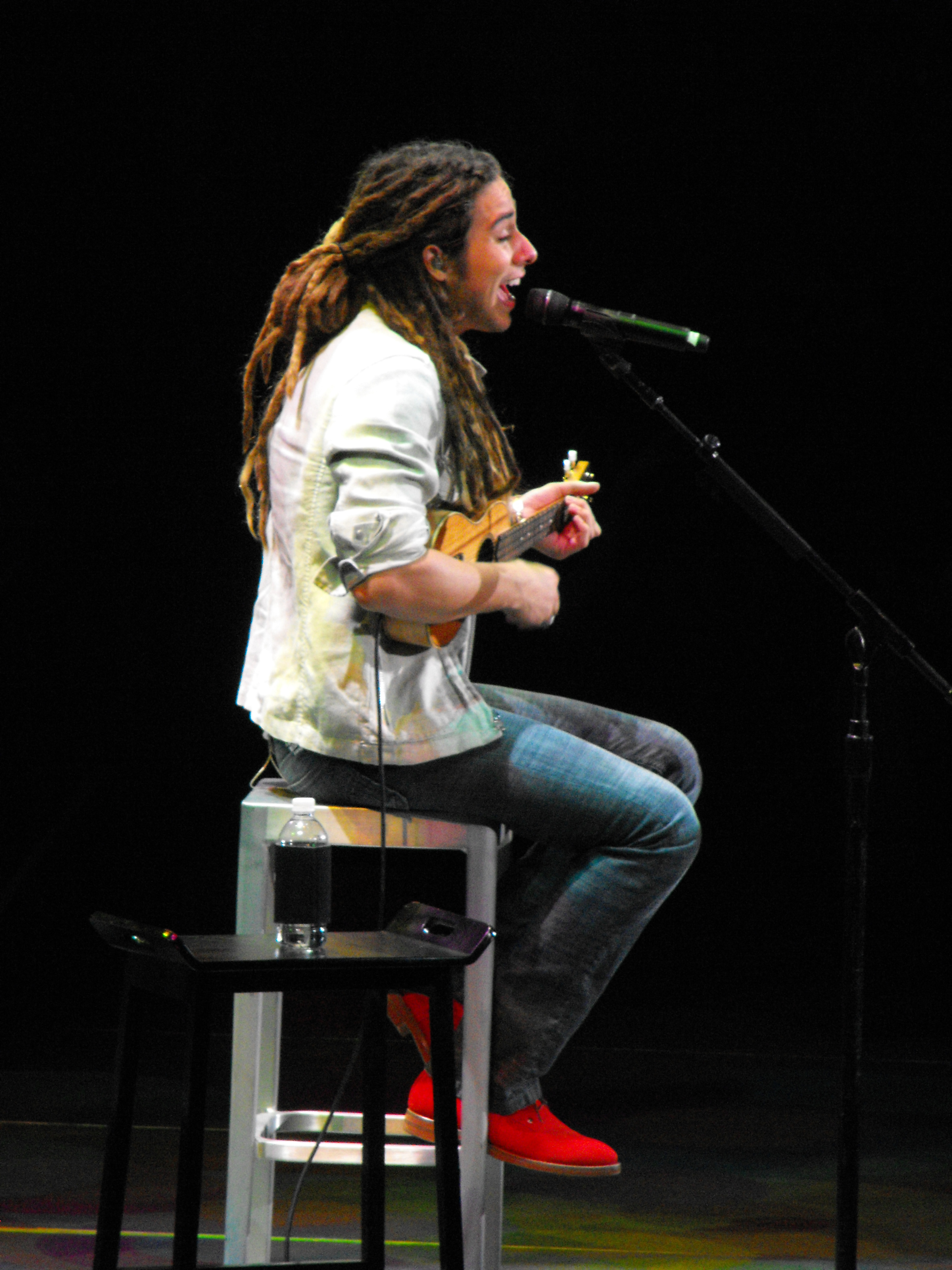
Castro during the American Idols Live! Tour, 2008

=== Overview ===
Castro auditioned for American Idol in Dallas, Texas, singing the Ray LaMontagne version of the song "Crazy". During a March 17, 2008 appearance on The Oprah Winfrey Show, judge Simon Cowell chose Castro as one of his four favorites in the competition, along with David Cook, David Archuleta, and Brooke White. On April 12, Ryan Seacrest and the three judges appeared in Larry King Live, Larry King revealed the results of his website poll which asked "Whom do you want to win American Idol?" and said that Castro was in the lead.

Castro played the guitar during the Top 24 performance night when he sang "Daydream". He was also the first contestant to play the ukulele on the show, playing the instrument while singing "Over the Rainbow". Castro also sang in Spanish in a combination of Sting's "Fragile" and "Fragilidad" on March 25, 2008. He was voted off the competition on May 7, 2008.

=== Hallelujah ===
Castro's rendition of the song "Hallelujah", which he performed on American Idol, led to a surge of popularity for the Jeff Buckley cover of the Leonard Cohen song from the iTunes Store. Buckley's version of the song sold 178,000 digital downloads in the week following Castro's performance, to debut at number one on Billboard's Hot Digital Songs chart. According to the March 22, 2008, issue of Billboard, this was the highest boost in digital sales a song had ever received after being performed by a contestant on American Idol. It was the first time Buckley's version of the song charted on a Billboard chart, as well as the first U.S. number-one song on any chart for Buckley. Jason Castro's rendition of the song propelled Jeff Buckley's version to be certified gold and platinum as a single on April 22, 2008.

=== Performances ===
Week #	Theme	Song choice	Original artist	Order #	Result
Top 24 (12 Men)	1960s	"Daydream"	The Lovin' Spoonful	11	Safe
Top 20 (10 Men)	1970s	"I Just Want to Be Your Everything"	Andy Gibb	2	Safe
Top 16 (8 Men)	1980s	"Hallelujah"	Leonard Cohen	7	Safe
Top 12	Lennon–McCartney	"If I Fell"	The Beatles	4	Safe
Top 11	The Beatles	"Michelle"	The Beatles	8	Safe
Top 10	Year They Were Born	"Fragile"	Sting	2	Bottom 3^{1}
Top 9	Dolly Parton	"Travelin' Thru"	Dolly Parton	4	Safe
Top 8	Inspirational Music	"Over the Rainbow"	Judy Garland	3	Safe
Top 7	Mariah Carey	"I Don't Wanna Cry"	Mariah Carey	7	Safe
Top 6	Andrew Lloyd Webber	"Memory"	Elaine Paige	2	Safe
Top 5	Neil Diamond	"Forever in Blue Jeans" "September Morn"	Neil Diamond	1; 6	Safe
Top 4	Rock and Roll Hall of Fame	"I Shot the Sheriff" "Mr. Tambourine Man"	Bob Marley; Bob Dylan	3; 7	Eliminated

- ^1 Castro was the first person declared to be safe on this elimination night.

== Post-Idol ==
After his elimination Castro went on to appear on The Tonight Show with Jay Leno and The Ellen DeGeneres Show.

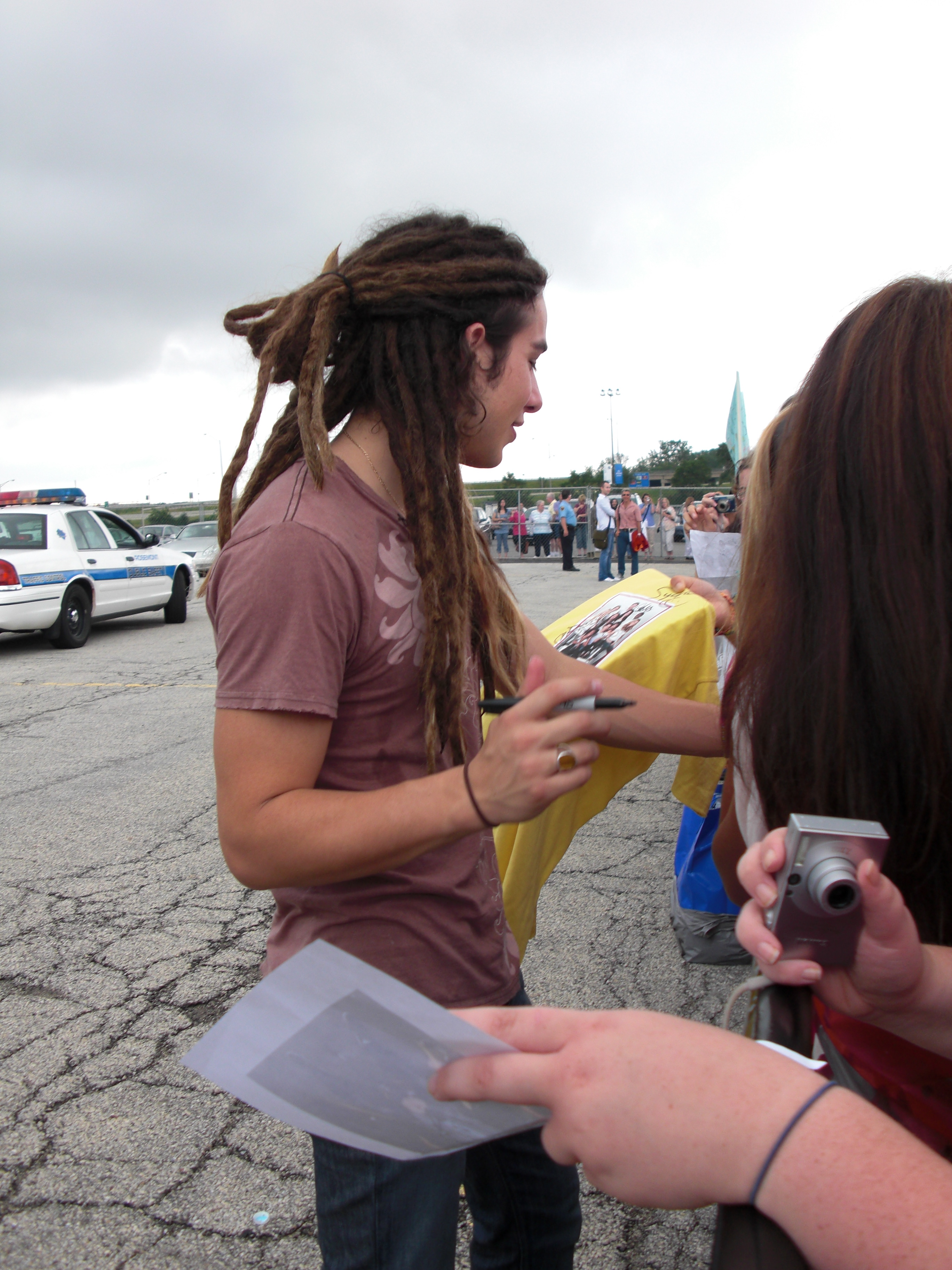
Castro signing autographs during the American Idols Live! Tour, 2008

Castro returned to the Idol stage for the seventh-season finale as the only top-12 finalist to perform a solo. He sang "Hallelujah".

When he returned to his hometown of Rockwall, Texas, Thursday, May 29, 2008, the day was declared "Jason Castro Day". Castro was honored with a parade and a ceremony/concert, one of the largest events in the city's history. Castro completed the American Idols LIVE! Tour 2008 with his fellow contestants over the summer from July 1, 2008, to September 13, 2008.

He recorded "Hallelujah" in Toronto, Canada, for an indie film, Amar a morir, which premiered in the spring of 2009. In 2008 he also took part in the "I Am Second" campaign, openly discussing his Christian faith. Castro signed a management deal with Hard8Mgt.

On November 29, 2008, Castro performed a live concert with his band, The Heavy Steadies, at the Flytrap Music Hall in Tulsa, Oklahoma; the concert included new songs from his album. On December 15, Castro released the Christmas song, "White Christmas" as a free download through Amazon.com as a gift for his fans. On December 24, 2008, Castro performed "White Christmas" at Lake Pointe Church's Christmas program. Castro performed the full version of "Hallelujah" at the world premiere of Amar A Morir on January 23 at the Santa Barbara International Film Festival.

On April 12, 2010, on Atlantic Records he released his self-titled album Jason Castro. He worked with songwriter, producer, and Idol judge, Kara DioGuardi and producer John Fields. Fellow Atlantic Records artist Serena Ryder appears with Castro on a duet titled "You Can Always Come Home". Castro sang "Over the Rainbow" and his second single "That's What I'm Here For" at the wedding of The Bachelor stars Jason Mesnick and Molly Malaney on February 27, 2010, for ABC's taping of The Bachelor: Jason and Molly’s Wedding.

In July 2010, Castro appeared in two episodes of The Bold and the Beautiful as himself.

Castro appeared in a small role in the GMC television movie The Perfect Summer in 2012.

=== 2009–2010: Debut album, EP, singles and promotion ===
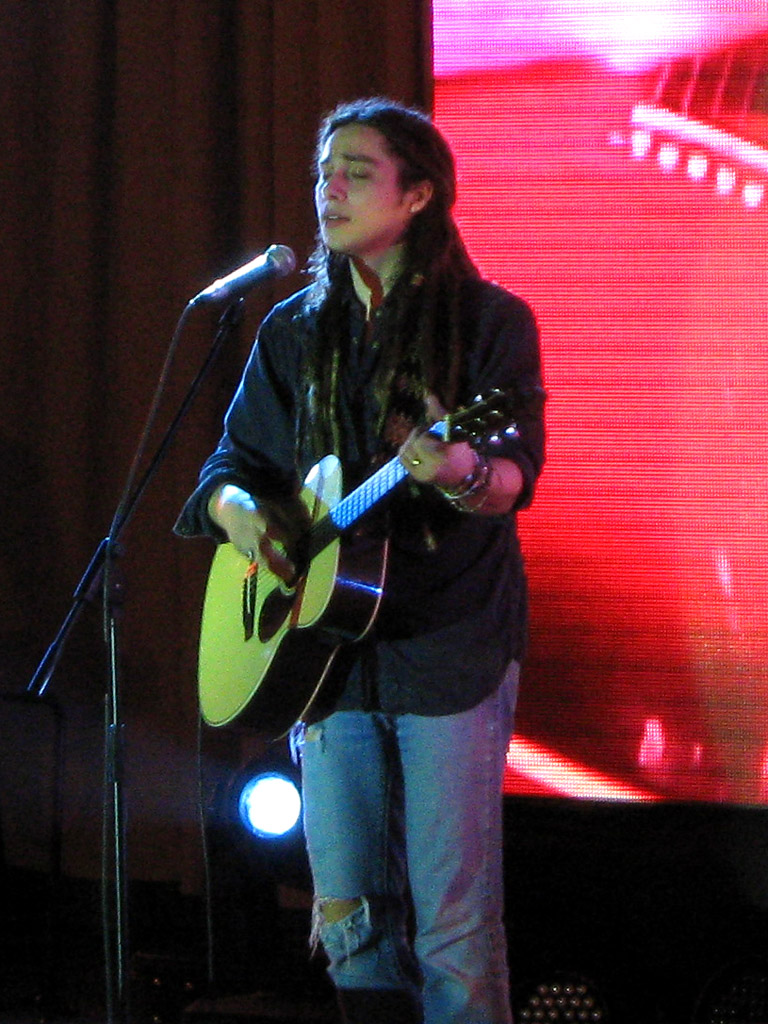
Castro in the Philippines to promote his EP and album

On August 18, 2009, Castro performed his new single "Let's Just Fall in Love Again" on a live video webchat from his website, as well another song titled "It Matters to Me". Castro's label, Atlantic Records, released presales of the album and offered the single as a free download to buyers. Castro's album was to be released in November 2009 but was pushed to an early 2010 release date. "Let'sJust Fall in Love Again" entered Billboard Heatseekers Songs chart at No. 15 and Hot Digital Songs at No. 57. "Let's Just Fall in Love Again" was used by Overstock.com for a television commercial. A music video for the single premiered on October 14, 2009. Castro released a debut EP in January 2010 titled The Love Uncompromised. Castro completed a tour with Matt Hires and Caitlin Crosby and traveled to Malaysia, Singapore and the Philippines to promote his EP and album. He then toured a second time with band Camera Can't Lie and his younger brother Michael as his opening acts to promote his album.

=== 2012–2013: Only a Mountain ===
Castro released a five-song EP on August 28, 2012. His third album, Only a Mountain, was released on January 15, 2013. Castro also toured on the Christian tour, Winterjam, in connection with this album.

=== Music with younger siblings and transition into real estate ===
Castro has released covers on iTunes with his two younger siblings, Michael and Jackie, both of whom are also singer-songwriters. The three siblings formed a group called Castro, and in May 2015 they released their first music video for the original song "Rock and Roll". The band released their first album Diamond Dreams with Fervent Records in 2016. Jackie left Castro in mid-2018 to pursue a solo career in Nashville, Tennessee. After the band broke up, Castro returned to Dallas and began work as real estate agent with Coldwell Banker Residential Brokerage. Two years later, he formed Castro Property Group with his brother.

== Personal life ==
Castro was the love interest of Cheyenne Kimball on her MTV reality show, Cheyenne and was also featured in her music video for "Hanging On".

On October 31, 2009, Castro proposed to Mandy Mayhall, his girlfriend of a year and a half. They were friends in high school and began dating in 2008. Mayhall made a cameo in Castro's music video for "Let's Just Fall in Love Again".

Castro and Mayhall were married on January 2, 2010, in his hometown and now reside in Dallas. The couple has five children.

=== Charity ===
When a former Castro fansite erroneously claimed that Castro's charity was GLOW Ministries, the organization based in Zeeland, Michigan received a lot of donations and attention to their cause.

Castro's father, Rene Castro, had been instrumental in starting a soccer ministry at Lake Pointe Church to reach out to the community. Jason played soccer in high school and has been to Russia three times with Higher Goal Soccer Ministry.

On December 13, 2008, Castro performed alongside Patti LaBelle for a Christmas concert in Garland, Texas, benefiting the Best Education Foundation, an organization that supports the city's school district. He also auctioned himself off for charity courtesy of the Grammy Foundation and MusiCares.

== Discography ==
- Jason Castro (2010)
- Who I Am (2010)
- Only a Mountain (2013)

== Filmography ==
- The Perfect Summer (2013)
- Jason Castro The Perfect Tour (2015)
