= Breathe (2 AM) =

2004 single by Anna Nalick

Single by Anna Nalick

from the album Wreck of the Day
- B-side: "Home" (acoustic version); "Catalyst" (acoustic version)
- Released: November 1, 2004
- Studio: Studio Wishbone (North Hollywood, California)
- Genre: Pop
- Length: 4:39 (album version); 4:09 (radio edit)
- Label: Columbia
- Songwriter: Anna Nalick
- Producers: Eric Rosse; Brad Smith; Christopher Thorn

Anna Nalick singles chronology
"Breathe (2 AM)" (2004)	"In the Rough" (2005)

"Breathe (2 AM)" is a song by American singer-songwriter Anna Nalick, released in November 2004 as her debut single. It was re-released in 2005, when it charted at number 45 on the US Billboard Hot 100 and number four on the Billboard Adult Contemporary chart. In New Zealand, it entered the top 40, peaking at number 37. "Breathe (2 AM)" has been certified gold by the Recording Industry Association of America (RIAA).

== Content ==
The verses of "Breathe (2 AM)" tell the stories of three characters: a friend of the narrator's who has fallen into an unhappy relationship, an alcoholic soldier at Fort Bliss, and the narrator's experience of writing and performing a song. Chuck Taylor describes it as "an introspective yet confessional tale about learning to handle everyday challenges — and remembering to take time to breathe".

== Composition ==
The song is composed in a key of A major, the time signature is 6/8 compound, and the tempo is "moderately slow, in 2" of 55 bpm, with the vocal range of F♯3–A4, according to Musicnotes.com.

== Release ==
In the United States, only a promotional disc of "Breathe (2 AM)" was released. In Australia, a proper CD single was issued, backed with acoustic versions of non-album track "Home" and Wreck of the Day album track "Catalyst".

== Credits and personnel ==
Credits are lifted from the US promo CD liner notes.

Studios

- Produced and recorded at Studio Wishbone (North Hollywood, California)
- Mixed at Image Recording Studios (Hollywood, California)
- Mastered at The Lodge (New York City)

Personnel

- Anna Nalick – words, music, vocals
- Christopher Thorn – guitars, production, recording
- Brad Smith – bass, production, recording
- Joey Waronker – drums
- Zac Rae – piano
- Cameron Stone – cello
- Eric Rosse – string arrangement, production, recording
- Chris Lord-Alge – mixing
- Emily Lazar – mastering
- Sarah Register – mastering assistant

== Charts ==
=== Weekly charts ===
Chart (2005–2006)	Peak position
Australia (ARIA)	79
Canada AC (Billboard)	29
Canada AC Top 30 (Radio & Records)	2
Canada Hot AC Top 30 (Radio & Records)	11
New Zealand (Recorded Music NZ)	37
US Billboard Hot 100	45
US Adult Contemporary (Billboard)	4
US Adult Top 40 (Billboard)	6
US Mainstream Top 40 (Billboard)	22
US Triple-A (Billboard)	16

=== Year-end charts ===
Chart (2005)	Position
US Adult Contemporary (Billboard)	14
US Adult Top 40 (Billboard)	9

== Certifications ==
Region	Certification	Certified units/sales
Canada (Music Canada)	Gold	10,000^{*}
United States (RIAA)	Gold	500,000^{*}
^{*} Sales figures based on certification alone.

== Release history ==
Region	Date	Format(s)	Label(s)	Ref.
United States	November 1, 2004	Hot adult contemporary radio	Columbia	
United States	February 14, 2005	Adult contemporary radio	Columbia	
United States	April 11, 2005	Contemporary hit radio	Columbia	
Australia	August 8, 2005	CD	Columbia	
