= Who I Am (Jason Castro album) =

Studio album by Jason Castro
- Released: November 9, 2010
- Recorded: 2009–10
- Genres: Contemporary Christian music, acoustic, pop
- Length: 36:36
- Label: Atlantic/Word

Jason Castro chronology
Jason Castro (2010)	Who I Am (2010)	Only a Mountain (2013)

Who I Am is the second studio album by contemporary Christian music singer and songwriter Jason Castro. It was released on November 9, 2010 via Atlantic Records and Word Records, and was the first record with Word and the last with Atlantic. The album has garnered mixed reviews from the critics and has already achieved success from the lead single "You Are".

== Critical reception ==
Professional ratings
Review scores
Source	Rating
CCM Magazine	3/5 stars
Cross Rhythms	8/10 stars
Jesus Freak Hideout	2.5/5 stars

CCM Magazine's Matt Conner gave the album a three-out-of-five-stars, noting that the album contains "Melodic arrangements", which "remain simple and catchy". Cross Rhythms' Stella Redburn gave the album an eight-out-of-ten-stars, praised the album as being one that is "acoustic - relaxed and understated, but with a sincere charm with a style that is not unlike Jason Mraz." Jesus Freak Hideout's Samantha Schuamberg gave the album a two-and-a-half-out-of-five-stars, was negative in writing that "Who I Am ends up seeming like a version of Castro's sound specifically tailored for the Christian market. This is not necessarily a bad thing, but the worshipful additions do not quite add a sense of originality to the album's overall sound. With less than stunning vocal challenges attempted, there is little to recognize as truly impressive with this release."

== Track listing ==
Revival
No.	Title	Writer(s)	Length
1.	"What If I Fall"	Jason Castro, Jamie Kenney & Phillip LaRue	3:42
2.	"You Are"	Castro & Jason Ingram	3:43
3.	"That's What I'm Here For"	Amund Bjoerklund, Castro, Espen Lind & Zachary David Maloy	3:22
4.	"Changing Colors"	Bjoerklund, Castro, Lind & Maloy	3:01
5.	"Who I Really Am"	Castro & Derek Walsh Webb	4:29
6.	"Wait (For a Miracle)"	Jason Castro, Ben Glover, LaRue	3:17
7.	"It Matters to Me"	Castro & Kenney	4:16
8.	"Let's Just Fall in Love Again"	Sean McConnell	3:31
9.	"This Heart of Mine"	Castro, Shawn Manigly, Marc Andrew Roberge & Gregg Steven Wattenburg	3:24
10.	"Hallelujah"		3:55
Total length:			36:36
