= Live from the Hotel Café =

EP by Matt Hires
- Released: October 7, 2008
- Recorded: At Hotel Cafe in Los Angeles
- Genre: Rock, pop
- Length: 15:17
- Label: Atlantic

Matt Hires chronology
| Live from the Hotel Café (2008) | Take Us to the Start (2009) |

Live from the Hotel Café is a 4-track EP by American pop-rock singer-songwriter Matt Hires released on October 7, 2008. It reached the top 10 on iTunes' Top Singer-Songwriters Albums chart upon its release. The EP contained three live performances and one demo track which selected performances at the Hotel Café in Los Angeles.

== Reception ==
=== Critical response ===
Live from the Hotel Café has received positive reviews from music critics.

Andrew Leahey from AllMusic said: "Hires sings, sounding like a younger Dave Matthews. His craft may not be up to par with that songwriting giant, but Live from the Hotel Cafe shows that Hires' influences are in the right place."

"His talent level is enough that even in four songs you know what a Matt Hires’ song sounds like. He’s etched his sonic mark in a very short time." -Awmusic

== Comparison ==
Upon his first release, Hires was often compared to John Mayer, Dave Matthews, Mat Kearney and Jack Johnson.

"Looking at Hires you can’t help but think of Jack Johnson, whose laidback eco-friendly personality figures heavily in both his appearance and his music. Johnson embodies the oceanside, surfing troubadour and Hires, with his trademark sandals and curly blonde locks, is aesthetically a Jack Johnson disciple." "There are times when you firmly believe you may have slid a Dave Matthews CD in by mistake. His songs, his rhythm and even his voice are so Dave Matthews you wonder openly wonder about the frailties of intellectual property." – Awmusic

Andrew Leahey said: "Open your mind and let your beauty flow like wine" Hires sings, sounding like a younger Dave Matthews. His craft may not be up to par with that songwriting giant, but Live from the Hotel Cafe shows that Hires' influences are in the right place."

Hires responded: "I like those artists. I don’t necessarily listen to a lot of their stuff so I don’t think my music sounds like them. I didn’t feel any pressure from that."

== Track listing ==
Live from the Hotel Café

| # | Title |
|---|---|
| 1. | "You Are the One (Live from the Hotel Café)" – 3:26 |
| 2. | "Oh, Sunrise (Live from the Hotel Café)" – 4:00 |
| 3. | "Tangled Web (Live from the Hotel Café)" – 3:54 |
| 4. | "Honey, Let Me Sing You a Song (Demo)" – 3:57 |

== Credits ==
Performance credits

- Matt Hires – Primary Artist, Acoustic Guitar, Vocals

Technical credits

- David Harrigan – Art Direction
- John Barnes Wellss – Engineer
