= Cornflake Girl =

1994 single by Tori Amos

- Standard US artwork (CD edition pictured)

Single by Tori Amos

from the album Under the Pink
- B-side: "Sister Janet"; "Daisy Dead Petals"; "Honey"; "A Case of You"; "If 6 Was 9"; "Strange Fruit"; "All the Girls Hate Her/Over It (Piano Suite)"
- Released: January 10, 1994
- Studio: The Fishhouse (Taos, New Mexico)
- Genre: Pop
- Length: 5:06 (album version); 3:54 (edit)
- Label: Atlantic; EastWest
- Songwriter: Tori Amos
- Producers: Tori Amos; Eric Rosse

Tori Amos singles chronology
"Crucify" (1992)	"Cornflake Girl" (1994)	"God" (1994)

Music video
- US version on YouTube
- UK version on YouTube

"Cornflake Girl" is a song by American singer-songwriter and pianist Tori Amos. It was released on January 10, 1994, by Atlantic and East West Records as the first single from her second studio album, Under the Pink (1994), in the United Kingdom. In the United States, it served as the album's second single, after "God". It was written by Amos and produced by her with Eric Rosse. Singer Merry Clayton provided backing vocals and sings the "man with the golden gun" bridge.

Peaking at number seven on the US Billboard Bubbling Under Hot 100, "Cornflake Girl" also experienced commercial success worldwide. It reached number four on the UK singles chart, number nine on the Irish Singles Chart, and number two in Iceland. In Australia, Belgium, Canada, Israel and the Netherlands, it reached the top 40. Two different music videos were produced for "Cornflake Girl".

== Inspiration and meaning ==
Amos' inspiration for "Cornflake Girl" came from the book Possessing the Secret of Joy (1992) by Alice Walker, which is about female genital mutilation in Africa, specifically how a close female family member would betray the victim by performing the procedure. Amos has said that growing up, the name they gave to girls who would hurt you despite close friendship was "cornflake girls".

== Release ==
Two separate "Cornflake Girl" CD singles were released in the UK. The first, released on January 10, 1994, contains three original B-sides: "Sister Janet", "All the Girls Hate Her" and "Over It"; the latter two being part of a Piano Suite. The second, released on January 17, 1994, was a limited edition picture CD housed in a digipak, containing cover versions of the songs "A Case of You" by Joni Mitchell, "If 6 Was 9" by Jimi Hendrix and "Strange Fruit" by Billie Holiday. The first CD single was replicated for the German and Australasian release, and its B-sides were re-used for the US "God" and "Cornflake Girl" releases. Other than "A Case of You" appearing on a US promotional CD compilation and a limited two-CD Australian tour edition of "Under the Pink", the three cover versions on the limited UK "Cornflake Girl" CD single have not been released on any other title to date, and are not available to purchase through digital retailers. As such, this CD remains a collectible item.

== Reception ==
Ned Raggett from AllMusic described the song as "a waltz-paced number with an unnerving whistle and stuttering vocal hook." Larry Flick from Billboard magazine noted it as a "bouncy, piano-driven single". He added, "As always, Amos weaves lyrics that push you to think as well as hum" and "this could be the big hit Amos has been waiting for." Troy J. Augusto from Cash Box wrote, "More painful confessional from Amos, a gifted singer-songwriter with a knack for making childhood pain perfect top-40 fodder. Reminiscent of early Kate Bush, this track will look to alternative and college radio for acceptance first, with rock outlets hopefully responding as well. Thematically, a bit depressing for hits stations, but an affecting, important release nonetheless." Peter Paphides from Melody Maker said, "'Cornflake Girl' is a seductive mordant piano and guitar duel that resolves itself only when everything stops and Tori does this really scary Kate Bush-like squeal on the chorus." Another Melody Maker editor, Chris Roberts, remarked the "sedulous swing" of the song.

A reviewer from Music & Media stated, "Amos is no musical Tory; she's as progressive and challenging as can be. But then again, this cornflake girl wouldn't have been what she is without having eaten from Kate Bush's cereal." John Kilgo from The Network Forty called it "trademark Tori Amos from the lyrics to the grassroots cadence." Mark Frith from Smash Hits gave it a score of two out of five, describing it as a "melancholy tune that doesn't go anywhere." Keeley Bolger commented in the 2010 book, 1001 Songs You Must Hear Before You Die, that it "could sound depressing in the wrong hands, but Amos's charm conjures up a song that is as otherworldly as its subject. The piano cascades, soft percussion, and ghostly chorus set it apart from the plod of Britpop and post-grunge dominating transatlantic charts at the time." In 2014, Stereogum ranked the song number one on their list of the 10 greatest Tori Amos songs, and in 2023, The Guardian ranked the song number seven on their list of the 20 greatest Tori Amos songs.

The song reached number four on the UK Singles Chart and was Amos' most successful international hit at the time. The single peaked within the top 10 in Ireland and Iceland, and within the top 20 in Australia. It was placed at number 35 on the Australian radio station Triple J's 1994 Hottest 100 poll, and ranked in Blender magazine's The 500 Greatest Songs Since You Were Born at number 433.

== Music video ==
There were produced two different music videos for "Cornflake Girl". The UK version was directed by Big TV!, two directors from the UK. Amos said that is based on The Wizard of Oz, except that Dorothy goes to Hell instead. Amos stated that she wanted there to be "two different visual expressions" of the song. The US video, directed by Amos and Nancy Bennett, features Amos driving a truck full of women around a typical American desert.

== Track listings ==
- US CD single
1. "Cornflake Girl" (edit) – 3:53
2. "Sister Janet" – 4:01
3. "Daisy Dead Petals" – 3:02
4. "Honey" – 3:47
- US cassette single
1. "Cornflake Girl" (edit) – 3:53
2. "Honey" – 3:47
- Canadian and Australian CD single, UK CD1
1. "Cornflake Girl" – 5:05
2. "Sister Janet" – 4:02
3. Piano Suite

1. "All the Girls Hate Her" – 2:23
2. "Over It" – 2:11

- UK CD2
1. "Cornflake Girl" – 5:05
2. "A Case of You" – 4:38
3. "If 6 Was 9" – 3:59
4. "Strange Fruit" – 4:00
- UK 7-inch and cassette single
1. "Cornflake Girl" – 5:05
2. "Sister Janet" – 4:01

== Credits and personnel ==
Credits are adapted from the Under the Pink album booklet.

Studios

- Recorded at The Fishhouse (Taos, New Mexico)
- Mixed at Olympic Studios (London, England)
- Mastered at Gateway Mastering (Portland, Maine, US)

Personnel

- Tori Amos – writing, vocals, piano, production
- Merry Clayton – guest vocals
- Steve Clayton – guitar, mandolin
- George Porter Jr. – bass
- Carlo Nuccio – drums
- Paulinho da Costa – percussion
- Eric Rosse – production, recording (guitars, other instruments), programming
- John Beverly Jones – recording (vocals, piano, percussion)
- Paul McKenna – recording (bass, drums)
- Kevin Killen – mixing
- Bob Ludwig – mastering

== Charts ==
=== Weekly charts ===
Weekly chart performance for "Cornflake Girl"
Chart (1994)	Peak position
Australia (ARIA)	19
Belgium (Ultratop 50 Flanders)	38
Canada Top Singles (RPM)	30
Canada Adult Contemporary (RPM)	24
Europe (Eurochart Hot 100)	16
Europe (European AC Radio)	8
Europe (European Hit Radio)	5
Finland (Suomen virallinen lista)	18
Germany (GfK)	73
Iceland (Íslenski Listinn Topp 40)	2
Ireland (IRMA)	9
Israel (Israeli Singles Chart)	16
Italy (Musica e dischi)	13
Netherlands (Dutch Top 40)	30
Netherlands (Single Top 100)	26
New Zealand (Recorded Music NZ)	41
UK Singles (Official Charts)	4
UK Airplay (Music Week)	6
US Bubbling Under Hot 100 (Billboard)	7
US Alternative Airplay (Billboard)	12

=== Year-end charts ===
Year-end chart performance for "Cornflake Girl"
Chart (1994)	Position
Australia (ARIA)	97
Iceland (Íslenski Listinn Topp 40)	65
UK Singles (OCC)	101

== Certifications ==
Region	Certification	Certified units/sales
United Kingdom (BPI)	Silver	200,000^{‡}
^{‡} Sales+streaming figures based on certification alone.

== Release history ==
Release dates and formats for "Cornflake Girl"
Region	Date	Format(s)	Label(s)	Ref.
United Kingdom	January 10, 1994	7-inch vinyl; CD1; CD2; cassette	Atlantic; EastWest	
Australia	February 14, 1994	CD; cassette	EastWest	

== Cover versions and other uses ==
The song was covered by post-hardcore band Jawbox as a hidden track on their self-titled 1996 album, as well as by the band Tapping the Vein on the Tori Amos tribute album, Songs of a Goddess. In 2007, after Amos had to pull out of an appearance on the Australian comedy program The Sideshow, musical comedy trio Tripod performed the song in her place.

On March 25, 2010, British electronic musician Imogen Heap covered the song live in Australia. The performance was done per request by the winner of an online charity auction who paid about US$4000 to win the item "VIP Experience Meet Imogen Heap + A Song Just For You".

On September 19, 2018, the British band Florence + The Machine released their version of this song, exclusively for Spotify.

A cover version performed by Jeff Russo and Noah Hawley was used for the soundtrack to season 2 of the TV series Legion.

In 2023, the song was featured in the drama television series Yellowjackets (Season 2, Episode 1, "Friends, Romans, Countrymen") and the Netflix dramedy series Beef (Season 1, Episode 2, "The Rapture of Being Alive").
