= Only a Mountain =

Studio album by Jason Castro
- Released: January 15, 2013
- Recorded: 2012
- Genre: CCM; acoustic; pop
- Length: 40:19
- Label: Word
- Producer: Matt Bronleewe; David Garcia; Ben Glover

Jason Castro chronology
| Who I Am (2010) | Only a Mountain (2013) |

Only a Mountain is the third studio album from American contemporary Christian singer Jason Castro. It was released on January 15, 2013, by Word Records, and was the first record with that label alone without co-label partner Atlantic Records in tow. The album has already garnered acclaim from the critics and has already achieved success from the lead single "Only a Mountain" on the charts.

== Critical response ==
Professional ratings
Review scores
| Source | Rating |
|---|---|
| AllMusic | 3.5/5 stars |
| CCM Magazine | 3/5 stars |
| Christian Music Review | 4/5 stars |
| Cross Rhythms | 6/10 squares |
| Indie Vision Music | 4/5 stars |
| Jesus Freak Hideout | 3.5/5 stars |
| New Release Tuesday | 4.5/5 stars |
| Worship Leader | 3.5/5 stars |

AllMusic's Matt Collar gave the album a three-and-a-half-out-of-five-stars, exclaiming that "Only a Mountain is a solid album that leaves you with the impression that Castro is more directly in command of his life, his career, and his music." At CCM Magazine, Grace S. Aspinwall gave the album a three-out-of-five-stars, calling this "a good project with many cheerful moments." April Covington of Christian Music Review gave the album a four-star-out-of-five, and found that "Jason Castro’s Only a Mountain album has you reminiscing over the time you truly fell in love with Christ, and the refreshing feeling of your worries and burdens being lifted. He carries a strong message with his folk-pop, coffee house style that made him famous on American Idol." Plus, Covington wrote that "his music will invoke powerful emotions in his listeners. You almost feel like he is speaking to you in an intimate way. At the same time, his poppy songs will have you signing and humming his lyrics all day." Cross Rhythms' Stephen Curry affirmed that "All the songs here show a positive faith in God who can tackle any problem", which he rated the album six-stars-out-of-ten, and called the effort "a thoughtful and well produced pop album though in places it struggles to show sufficient distinctiveness to rise above the welter of pop releases."

Jonathan Andre of Indie Vision Music gave the album a four-out-of-five-stars, praising Only A Mountain as "one of the most lyrically rich and musically relevant releases". Jesus Freak Hideout's Tincan Caldwell gave the album a three-and-a-half-out-of-five-stars, noting that "Only A Mountain fits sonically with other Idol alumnus' albums (that is to say, the music is mostly 'safe' pop and designed to appeal to the widest possible audience), but still shines brightly in spots and points to Castro having a long career ahead of him." New Release Tuesday's Dawn Teresa gave the album a four-and-a-half-out-of-five-stars, proclaiming that "Jason Castro has always had a strong, original voice. Up until now, his records haven’t had the strength of material to match it. However, with Only A Mountain, he has come into his own. His songwriting has matured, his music has grown more robust and varied, and his performance is consistently passionate and energetic. If listeners embrace it, Only A Mountain could be a breakthrough album for a bright new talent." At Worship Leader, Lindsay Young gave the album a three-and-a-half-out-of-five-stars, surmising that "This album is solid from beginning to end. Though slightly predictable and not too thought provoking lyrically, Only A Mountain is enjoyable and well produced", but stating that at the same time "What you see is what you get, and a pop album is a pop album. If you’re looking for content with deep theological truths, you won’t find that here."

== Track listing ==
Track listing
| No. | Title | Writer(s) | Length |
|---|---|---|---|
| 1. | "Only a Mountain" | Jason Castro; Mia Fieldes; Seth Mosley | 3:02 |
| 2. | "I Believe" | Castro; Ben Rector | 3:36 |
| 3. | "If It's Love" | Castro; David Garcia; Ben Glover | 3:35 |
| 4. | "Starting Line" | Castro; Mosley; Phillip LaRue | 3:32 |
| 5. | "Stay This Way" | Castro; Garcia; Glover | 3:49 |
| 6. | "Same Kind of Broken" (featuring Moriah Peters) | Castro; Hillary McBride; Parker Welling | 3:48 |
| 7. | "Safehouse" | Castro; Aaron Rice; Rusty Varenkamp | 4:39 |
| 8. | "Runaway" | Castro; Mosley; Micah Kuiper | 3:59 |
| 9. | "Enough" | Castro; Garcia; Glover | 3:29 |
| 10. | "Rise to You" | Castro; Matt Bronleewe | 3:45 |
| 11. | "Good Love" | Castro; Welling; Jillian Edwards | 3:05 |
| Total length: | | | 40:19 |

iTunes Deluxe Edition Bonus Tracks
| No. | Title | Writer(s) | Length |
|---|---|---|---|
| 12. | "Life Is Beautiful" | Castro; LaRue; Mosley | 3:00 |
| 13. | "Something New" | Castro; Brownleewe | 3:46 |
| 14. | "Only a Mountain (Acoustic)" | Castro; Fieldes; Mosley | 2:53 |
| 15. | "Only a Mountain" (Music Video) | | 3:03 |

== Charts ==
=== Weekly charts ===
Weekly chart performance for Only a Mountain
| Chart (2013) | Peak position |
|---|---|
| US Top Christian Albums (Billboard) | 14 |
| US Top Current Albums (Billboard) | 183 |

=== Singles ===
Singles chart performance for Only a Mountain
| Year | Single | Peak chart positions |
| Year | Single | US Christ. |
|---|---|---|
| 2012 | "Only a Mountain" | 19 |
