= Matt Hires =

American singer-songwriter

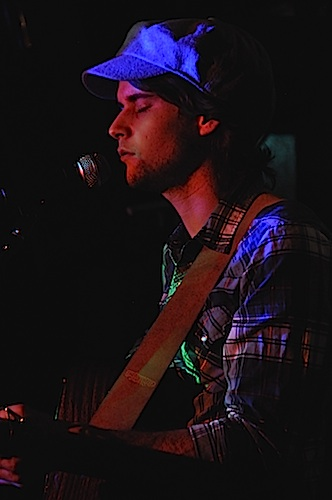

Background information
- Born: August 5, 1985 (age 40)
- Origin: Tampa, Florida
- Genres: Pop rock
- Occupations: Singer, songwriter
- Instruments: Guitar, vocals, melodica, bass, harmonica
- Years active: 2005–present
- Labels: F-Stop, Atlantic

Matt Hires (born August 5, 1985) is an American singer-songwriter from Tampa, Florida. Drawing inspiration from influences as disparate as The Band, Sufjan Stevens, Wilco and Ryan Adams, Hires became the first artist to sign with F-Stop Music, an imprint of Atlantic Records.

== Biography ==
As a cabinet store worker by day and a musician by night, Hires always had a heroic passion for music. Hires' father, also a musician, introduced him to music at a young age, giving him the handmade guitar that he continues to play. Initially drawn to the punk, Post-hardcore, and Emo scenes, Hires later developed an interest in artists like Tom Petty and Bob Dylan, which explains the uniqueness of his vocal and instrumental harmonies that dabble in both traditional and contemporary musical realms.

Hires began his music career as frontman for Tampa, Florida–based band Brer. The band's debut record, Microwavable, was produced by Will Denton, longtime drummer for Steven Curtis Chapman. Atlantic Records A&R executive, Gregg Nadel, fell in love with his sound. Soon Hires began working with producer Eric Rosse (Sara Bareilles, Tori Amos, David Archuleta), and together they recorded his first full-length record.

== Live From the Hotel Café, EP ==
Hires released his debut EP, Live From the Hotel Cafe, under F-Stop Music/Atlantic Records, on October 7, 2008. Although only four songs in length, the EP gained him solid exposure, with critics comparing him to the likes of Jack Johnson, John Mayer, Matt Costa, Mat Kearney, and Bright Eyes. But still, critics conceded that Hires has a sincerity and authenticity of his own.

Building his fan base in preparation for his debut album, Hires appeared at the SXSW Music Festival and on the 2009 Mayercraft Carrier. He has also opened for Dave Matthews, Marc Broussard, OAR, and Paolo Nutini.

== Take Us to the Start ==
On July 28, 2009, Hires released his debut full-length album, Take Us to the Start, featuring his first single, "Honey Let Me Sing You A Song." The album also features "You in The End", co-written by Sara Bareilles. Tracks from Take Us to the Start have appeared on Grey's Anatomy, Private Practice, Cougar Town on ABC and Life Unexpected on The CW.

== Discography ==
=== Albums ===
Year	Album	Peak chart positions	Certifications (sales thresholds)
Year	Album	US	Certifications (sales thresholds)
2009	Take Us to the Start: Released on August 25, 2009 (CD) July 15, 2009 (Digital download); Label: Atlantic; Formats: CD, digital download	96	—
2013	This World Won't Last Forever, But Tonight We Can Pretend: Released on August 13, 2013; Label: Atlantic; Formats: CD, digital download	—	—
2016	American Wilderness: Released on October 16, 2016; Label: Rock Ridge Music; Formats: CD, digital download	—	—

=== EPs ===
Year	Album	Peak chart positions	Certifications (sales thresholds)
Year	Album	US	Certifications (sales thresholds)
2008	Live From the Hotel Café EP: Released on October 7, 2008 (CD, Digital Download); Label: Atlantic; Formats: CD, digital download	—	—
2010	A to B EP: Released on August 17, 2010 (Digital Download); Label: Atlantic; Formats: digital download	—	—
2011	Live Sessions EP: Released on March 8, 2011 (Digital Download); Label: Atlantic; Formats: digital download	—	—
2013	Forever EP: Released on February 11, 2013 (Digital Download); Label: Atlantic; Formats: digital download	—	—

=== Singles ===
Year	Single	Chart positions		Album
Year	Single	US Hot 100	US Rock	Album
2009	"Honey, Let Me Sing You a Song"	—	—	Take Us to the Start
2013	"Restless Heart"	—	—	This World Won't Last Forever, But Tonight We Can Pretend
