= Melissa Hasin =

American cellist (born 1954)

- Born: November 3, 1954 (age 71); Hollywood, California, U.S.
- Genres: Jazz, rock
- Instruments: Cello, violin, strings
- Label: Cexton

Melissa "Missy" Hasin (born November 3, 1954) is an American cellist who was raised in Newport Beach, California.

== Biography ==
Although her parents wanted her to stick with classical music, she played the electric bass in various blues and rock bands as a teenager but later concentrated mainly on the cello. She earned a BA in music from California State University Long Beach in 1978. Hasin considers Jaco Pastorius and John Patitucci as primary influences.

== Discography ==
- Cellistic Visions, Cexton Records
- How My Heart Sings (1997), Cexton Records
