= The Original Bootlegs =

2005 live album series by Tori Amos

Live album by Tori Amos
- Released: August 30, 2005 – December 6, 2005
- Recorded: April 15, 2005 – August 21, 2005
- Venues: Auditorium Theatre (Chicago, Illinois); Royce Hall Auditorium (Los Angeles, California); Paramount Theatre (Denver, Colorado); Manchester Apollo (Manchester, England); Hammersmith Apollo (London, England); Bank of America Pavilion (Boston, Massachusetts)
- Genre: Alternative rock
- Length: 117:55; 108:41; 105:51; 109:28; 112:42; 119:48
- Label: Epic

Tori Amos live chronology
| To Venus and Back (1999) | The Original Bootlegs (2005) | Legs and Boots (2007) |

The Original Bootlegs is a series of six live albums by American singer-songwriter and pianist Tori Amos, recorded during the Original Sinsuality and Summer of Sin tours, both of which were in support of her eighth studio album, The Beekeeper (2005). Two-disc sets were released for each complete show, which were released in three waves of two albums each. On December 6, 2005, a cardboard-housed compilation of all six concerts was released, titled The Original Bootlegs. The albums' cover art is minimal, with artwork featuring animal silhouettes, following the theme of The Beekeeper, which places songs into different metaphorical gardens.

Amos later released a similar series of recordings from her subsequent American Doll Posse Tour, titled Legs and Boots.

== Track listings ==
=== Auditorium Theatre, Chicago, IL 4/15/05 ===

- Recorded: Auditorium Theatre, Chicago, Illinois, April 15, 2005
- Released: August 30, 2005
- Catalog number: 96442

All tracks are written by Tori Amos, except where noted.

Disc 1
| No. | Title | Writer(s) | Length |
|---|---|---|---|
| 1. | "Original Sinsuality" | | 3:53 |
| 2. | "Father Lucifer" | | 5:34 |
| 3. | "Mother Revolution" | | 5:26 |
| 4. | "Yes, Anastasia" | | 7:12 |
| 5. | "Apollo's Frock" | | 5:47 |
| 6. | "Parasol" | | 4:48 |
| 7. | "Mother" | | 7:28 |
| 8. | "Operator" | Jim Croce | 6:19 |
| 9. | "The Circle Game" | Joni Mitchell | 6:39 |
| 10. | "Cars & Guitars" | | 4:37 |
| Total length: | | | 57:45 |

Disc 2
| No. | Title | Writer(s) | Length |
|---|---|---|---|
| 1. | "Space Dog" | | 7:41 |
| 2. | "Marianne" | | 5:18 |
| 3. | "Barons of Suburbia" | | 6:07 |
| 4. | "Cool on Your Island" | Amos, Kim Bullard | 5:45 |
| 5. | "The Beekeeper" | | 10:19 |
| 6. | "Honey" | | 4:44 |
| 7. | "Sweet the Sting" | | 5:56 |
| 8. | "Cloud on My Tongue" | | 6:56 |
| 9. | "Ribbons Undone" | | 7:22 |
| Total length: | | | 60:10 |

=== Royce Hall Auditorium, Los Angeles, CA 4/25/05 ===

- Recorded: Royce Hall Auditorium, Los Angeles, California, April 25, 2005
- Released: August 30, 2005
- Catalog number: 96443

All tracks are written by Tori Amos, except where noted.

Disc 1
| No. | Title | Writer(s) | Length |
|---|---|---|---|
| 1. | "Original Sinsuality" | | 3:55 |
| 2. | "Silent All These Years" | | 5:47 |
| 3. | "Parasol" | | 5:35 |
| 4. | "Doughnut Song" | | 7:00 |
| 5. | "Yes, Anastasia" | | 5:55 |
| 6. | "Jamaica Inn" | | 6:34 |
| 7. | "Cool on Your Island" | Amos, Kim Bullard | 5:21 |
| 8. | "Livin' on a Prayer" | Jon Bon Jovi, Richie Sambora, Desmond Child | 5:53 |
| 9. | "All Through the Night" | Jules Shear | 4:31 |
| Total length: | | | 50:32 |

Disc 2
| No. | Title | Length |
|---|---|---|
| 1. | "Barons of Suburbia" | 6:18 |
| 2. | "Take to the Sky" | 6:19 |
| 3. | "Cloud on My Tongue" | 6:33 |
| 4. | "Ruby Through the Looking-Glass" | 6:45 |
| 5. | "The Beekeeper" | 10:56 |
| 6. | "Tear in Your Hand" | 6:26 |
| 7. | "Toast" | 5:12 |
| 8. | "Sweet the Sting" | 5:31 |
| 9. | "Twinkle" | 4:05 |
| Total length: | | 58:09 |

=== Paramount Theatre, Denver, CO 4/19/05 ===

- Recorded: Paramount Theatre, Denver, Colorado, April 19, 2005
- Released: October 4, 2005
- Catalog number: 97634

All tracks are written by Tori Amos, except where noted.

Disc 1
| No. | Title | Writer(s) | Length |
|---|---|---|---|
| 1. | "Original Sinsuality" | | 3:31 |
| 2. | "Little Amsterdam" | | 6:58 |
| 3. | "Icicle" | | 6:36 |
| 4. | "Your Cloud" | | 5:58 |
| 5. | "Jamaica Inn" | | 6:23 |
| 6. | "Father Lucifer" | | 5:07 |
| 7. | "Cool on Your Island" | Amos, Kim Bullard | 5:31 |
| 8. | "I Ran" | Mike Score, Ali Score, Frank Maudsley, Paul Reynolds | 5:32 |
| 9. | "Suzanne" | Leonard Cohen | 6:49 |
| Total length: | | | 52:28 |

Disc 2
| No. | Title | Length |
|---|---|---|
| 1. | "The Power of Orange Knickers" | 4:21 |
| 2. | "Cloud on My Tongue" | 6:45 |
| 3. | "Space Dog" | 8:08 |
| 4. | "Parasol" | 4:50 |
| 5. | "Carbon" | 6:18 |
| 6. | "The Beekeeper" | 11:11 |
| 7. | "Leather" | 5:06 |
| 8. | "Putting the Damage On" | 6:42 |
| Total length: | | 53:23 |

=== Manchester Apollo, Manchester, UK 6/5/05 ===

- Recorded: Manchester Apollo, Manchester, England, June 5, 2005
- Released: October 4, 2005
- Catalog number: 97635

All tracks are written by Tori Amos, except where noted.

Disc 1
| No. | Title | Writer(s) | Length |
|---|---|---|---|
| 1. | "Original Sinsuality" | | 4:05 |
| 2. | "Little Amsterdam" | | 7:33 |
| 3. | "Leather" | | 4:40 |
| 4. | "Beauty Queen" | | 1:42 |
| 5. | "Horses" | | 4:46 |
| 6. | "Liquid Diamonds" | | 8:43 |
| 7. | "Suede" | | 7:59 |
| 8. | "Strange" | | 4:36 |
| 9. | "Don't Look Back in Anger" | Noel Gallagher | 6:13 |
| 10. | "My Favorite Things" | Rodgers and Hammerstein | 3:26 |
| Total length: | | | 53:44 |

Disc two
| No. | Title | Length |
|---|---|---|
| 1. | "Winter" | 7:25 |
| 2. | "Carbon" | 5:32 |
| 3. | "Ribbons Undone" | 7:07 |
| 4. | "Spring Haze" | 8:26 |
| 5. | "The Beekeeper" | 10:33 |
| 6. | "Not the Red Baron" | 3:39 |
| 7. | "Never Seen Blue" | 7:02 |
| 8. | "Sweet the Sting" | 5:57 |
| Total length: | | 55:44 |

=== Hammersmith Apollo, London, UK 6/4/05 ===

- Recorded: Hammersmith Apollo, London, England, June 4, 2005
- Released: November 15, 2005
- Catalog number: 97790

All tracks are written by Tori Amos, except where noted.

Disc 1
| No. | Title | Writer(s) | Length |
|---|---|---|---|
| 1. | "Original Sinsuality" | | 4:17 |
| 2. | "Father Lucifer" | | 5:15 |
| 3. | "Icicle" | | 5:42 |
| 4. | "Mother Revolution" | | 7:32 |
| 5. | "Take to the Sky" | | 5:33 |
| 6. | "Yes, Anastasia" | | 5:36 |
| 7. | "Bells for Her" | | 6:44 |
| 8. | "Father Figure" | George Michael | 6:20 |
| 9. | "Like a Prayer" | Madonna, Patrick Leonard | 5:08 |
| Total length: | | | 52:11 |

Disc 2
| No. | Title | Writer(s) | Length |
|---|---|---|---|
| 1. | "Winter" | | 7:25 |
| 2. | "Cooling" | | 5:26 |
| 3. | "Jamaica Inn" | | 6:44 |
| 4. | "Witness" | | 6:55 |
| 5. | "The Beekeeper" | | 10:50 |
| 6. | "Sweet the Sting" | | 6:21 |
| 7. | "Rattlesnakes" | Neil Clark, Lloyd Cole | 5:56 |
| 8. | "Hoochie Woman" | | 3:39 |
| 9. | "Hey Jupiter" | | 7:12 |
| Total length: | | | 60:31 |

=== B of A Pavilion, Boston, MA 8/21/05 ===

- Recorded: Bank of America Pavilion, Boston, Massachusetts, August 21, 2005
- Released: December 6, 2005
- Catalog number: 97791

All tracks are written by Tori Amos, except where noted.

Disc 1
| No. | Title | Writer(s) | Length |
|---|---|---|---|
| 1. | "Original Sinsuality" | | 4:29 |
| 2. | "Caught a Lite Sneeze" | | 7:14 |
| 3. | "Amber Waves" | | 6:27 |
| 4. | "Martha's Foolish Ginger" | | 5:14 |
| 5. | "Winter" | | 7:27 |
| 6. | "Pancake" | | 5:27 |
| 7. | "Cool on Your Island" | Amos, Kim Bullard | 5:31 |
| 8. | "Total Eclipse of the Heart" | Jim Steinman | 7:58 |
| 9. | "Angie" | Jagger–Richards | 6:24 |
| Total length: | | | 63:36 |

Disc 2
| No. | Title | Writer(s) | Length |
|---|---|---|---|
| 1. | "Barons of Suburbia" | | 8:32 |
| 2. | "Garlands" | | 8:44 |
| 3. | "Tear in Your Hand" | | 9:03 |
| 4. | "The Beekeeper" | | 13:00 |
| 5. | "Dream On" | Steven Tyler | 6:36 |
| 6. | "Pretty Good Year" | | 5:24 |
| 7. | "Playboy Mommy" | | 5:29 |
| 8. | "1,000 Oceans" | | 6:47 |
| Total length: | | | 56:12 |

== Sales and chart performance ==
| Album | Peak position |
|---|---|
| Auditorium Theatre, Chicago, IL 4/15/05 | — |
| Royce Hall Auditorium, Los Angeles, CA 4/25/05 | — |
| Paramount Theatre, Denver, CO 4/19/05 | 18 |
| Manchester Apollo, Manchester, UK 6/5/05 | 17 |
| Hammersmith Apollo, London, UK 6/04/05 | 21 |
| B of A Pavilion, Boston, MA 8/21/05 | — |

The chart above shows the peak positions for the individual The Original Bootlegs releases on the Billboard Top Internet Albums chart. The Paramount Theatre and Manchester Apollo releases charted the week of 29 October 2005 and the Hammersmith Apollo release charted the week of 3 December 2005. Each release placed on the Top Internet Albums chart for a single week.

As of May 2008, the Auditorium Theater and Royce Hall Auditorium releases have sold 7,000 copies each; the Paramount Theater, Manchester Apollo and Hammersmith Apollo releases have sold 5,000 copies each; and the B of A Pavilion release has sold 3,000 copies. The compilation The Original Bootlegs, which includes all six shows, has sold 6,000 copies, according to Nielsen SoundScan.

== See also ==
- The Beekeeper
- Legs and Boots
