= Piece by Piece (book) =

2005 autobiography by Tori Amos

- Cover art of Piece by Piece
- Author: Tori Amos, Ann Powers
- Cover artist: Marysarah Quinn
- Language: English
- Genre: Autobiography
- Publisher: Broadway
- Publication date: February 8, 2005
- Publication place: United States
- Media type: Hardcover
- Pages: 348
- ISBN: 0-7679-1676-X

Piece by Piece is an autobiographical book by singer/songwriter Tori Amos and co-authored by rock music journalist Ann Powers. It was published in the U.S. on February 8, 2005 and in the U.K. in June 2005.

== Synopsis ==
The book is told in a conversational style with questions posed by Ann and responded to by Tori. They compiled the material for the book through phone calls, e-mail conversations and in-person interviews. Along with details about Amos' career, music and personal life it also delves into mythology and religion in a fashion often associated with Amos. The lyrics "piece by piece" feature in the song "Datura" on the 1999 album To Venus and Back.

== Commercial and critical success ==
The book received mixed reviews from critics, who generally agreed that Amos' writing on the music industry and recording process was the stellar part of the book. Blender magazine cited the work as "no mere star memoir ... it's more like a soul-map of Amos' stride from pop tart to poet provocateur." Regardless of reviews, the book was more successful than expected and was published in conjunction with Amos' solo album The Beekeeper (2005). The book peaked on the New York Times bestseller list at #12.

== Content ==
The work consists of eight chapters, each of which includes "song canvases" explaining Amos' inspiration and process for developing particular songs.

- Introduction: The Soul's Dance
- Chapter 1: Corn Mother: Genealogies

Song canvases: "Ireland", "The Beekeeper", "Mother Revolution"

- Chapter 2: Mary Magdalene: The Erotic Muse

Song canvases: "The Power of Orange Knickers", "God", "Marys of the Sea", "Lust", "I'm Not in Love"

- Chapter 3: Saraswati: The Art of Composition

Song canvases: "Garlands", "Parasol", "Sweet the Sting", "Sleeps with Butterflies", "Cars and Guitars"

- Chapter 4: Demeter: The Journey into Motherhood

Song canvases: "Pandora's Aquarium", "Muhammad, My Friend", and "Ribbons Undone"

- Chapter 5: Dionysus: Bringing the Music Forth

Song canvases: "Wampum Prayer" and "Winter"

- Chapter 6: Sane Satyrs and Balanced Bacchantes: The Touring Life's Gypsy Caravan

Song canvas: "Martha's Foolish Ginger"

- Chapter 7: Venus: Creating a Public Self

Song canvas: "Goodbye Pisces"

- Chapter 8: The Lioness: Surviving the Music Business

Song canvases: "Take to the Sky", "Hoochie Woman", "Witness", and "Barons of Suburbia"

- Conclusion: Quan Yin: The Art of Compassion

Song canvas: "Jamaica Inn"
