= Datura (disambiguation) =

Datura is a genus of flowering plants.

Datura may also refer to:

- Datura (band), an Italian dance group
- "Datura (song)", a Tori Amos song
- 1270 Datura, an asteroid
- Datura (video game), a video game.
