= Royce Hall =

Building on the campus of the University of California, Los Angeles

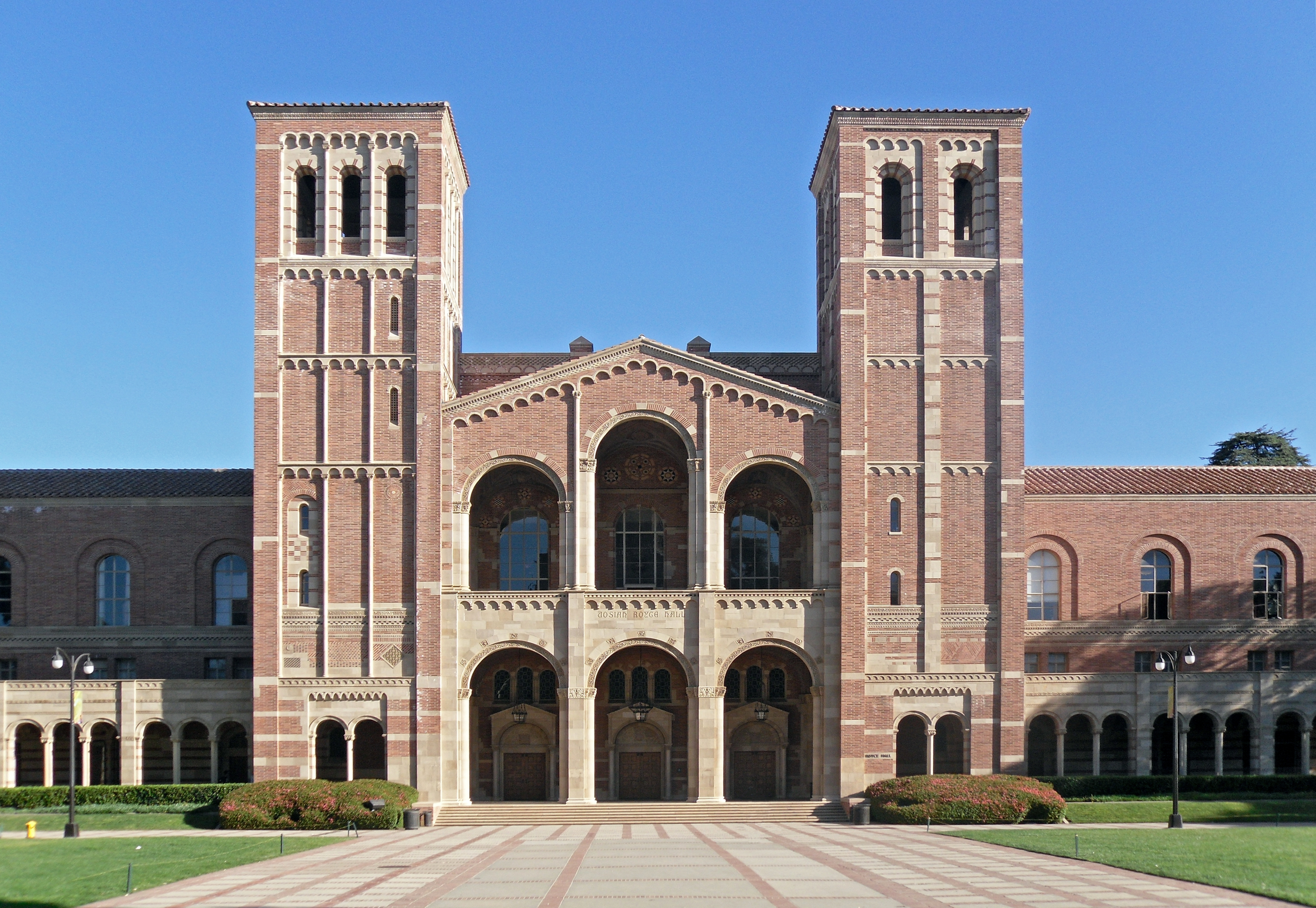
- Main façade of Royce Hall, inspired by the Basilica of Sant'Ambrogio in Milan, Italy
- Interactive map of Royce Hall
- Address: 340 Royce Drive; Los Angeles, California; United States
- Coordinates: 34°4′22″N 118°26′31″W
- Owner: University of California, Los Angeles
- Operator: University of California, Los Angeles
- Capacity: 1,800
- Type: Performing arts center

Construction
- Opened: 1929
- Architect: Allison & Allison

Website
- www.roycehall.org

Royce Hall is a building on the campus of the University of California, Los Angeles (UCLA). Designed by the Los Angeles firm of Allison & Allison (James Edward Allison, 1870–1955, and his brother David Clark Allison, 1881–1962) and completed in 1929, it is one of the four original buildings on UCLA's Westwood campus and has come to be the defining image of the university. The brick and tile building is in the Lombard Romanesque style, and once functioned as the main classroom facility of the university and symbolized its academic and cultural aspirations. Today, the twin-towered front remains the best known UCLA landmark. The 1800-seat auditorium was designed for speech acoustics and not for music; by 1982 it emerged from successive remodelings as a regionally important concert hall and main performing arts facility of the university.

Named after Josiah Royce, a California-born philosopher who received his bachelor's degree from UC Berkeley in 1875, the building's exterior is composed of elements borrowed from numerous northern Italian sources. While very different in their composition and near-symmetry, the two towers of Royce make an abstract reference to those of the famous Abbey Church of Sant'Ambrogio in Milan. A building of very similar form on a much smaller scale was a centerpiece of the College of California campus in Oakland in 1860, the predecessor of the University of California.

== Renovation ==
Severely damaged in the 1994 Northridge earthquake, Royce Hall underwent a $70.5 million seismic renovation. Designed by architects Barton Phelps & Associates and Anshen + Allen Los Angeles and completed in 1998, the project combined structural strengthening and functional improvements with extensive interior updating. The iconic towers were strengthened and restored on an emergency basis. The project for the 200,000 square foot building itself inserted a new, six-story structural system of concrete panels located in the auditorium walls and connected by concrete beams to the building's historic exterior brickwork. Eligibility for National Register listing prompted FEMA earthquake resistance requirements well beyond normal safety levels and triggered close design scrutiny by preservation officers. The new "soft" structure is designed to respond in unison with original masonry infill to provide maximum earthquake resistance and protect the building's historic fabric from damage.

=== Auditorium ===
The sidewalls of the auditorium were reconfigured to incorporate foot-thick concrete shear panels, the volume of which may have reduced its reverberant character. New wall openings, cut into previously unused rooftop areaways, were enclosed with new structures to create operable acoustic galleries that allow for adjustable acoustic responses.

Together with new ceiling coves, these galleries increase the hall’s volume by 40,000 cubic feet and extend its reverberation time by more than one second at maximum setting. Skylights within the galleries restore natural light to the coffered ceiling, which is now illuminated for the first time.

Unlike the former plaster interior, the new walls are clad in brick and terra cotta matching the building’s original exterior. The uneven texture of the projecting blocks enhances sound diffusion, with patterns inspired by Lombard Romanesque motifs found in Lucca and other cities of the Po River valley in northern Italy.

The hall, post renovation, covered 191,547 square feet (17,795.3 m^{2}).

The hall contains a 6,600-pipe E.M. Skinner pipe organ, renovated and expanded in 1999 by Robert Turner. During the 1930s, Salt Lake Tabernacle organist Alexander Schreiner gave public recitals three times a week on the instrument. The organ was later featured in several recording sessions of the Los Angeles Philharmonic under Zubin Mehta. It serves as one of the home venues for the Los Angeles Chamber Orchestra. Luminaries who have appeared on its stage include musicians George Gershwin, Leonard Bernstein, and Ella Fitzgerald, and speakers Albert Einstein and John F. Kennedy.

In 2012, the hall installed a new $128,000 Steinway concert grand piano. Nicknamed "Sapphire" by the staff, the piano has already been used as the centerpiece of a $25,000-per-plate fundraising dinner to support emerging artists.

Royce Hall Auditorium

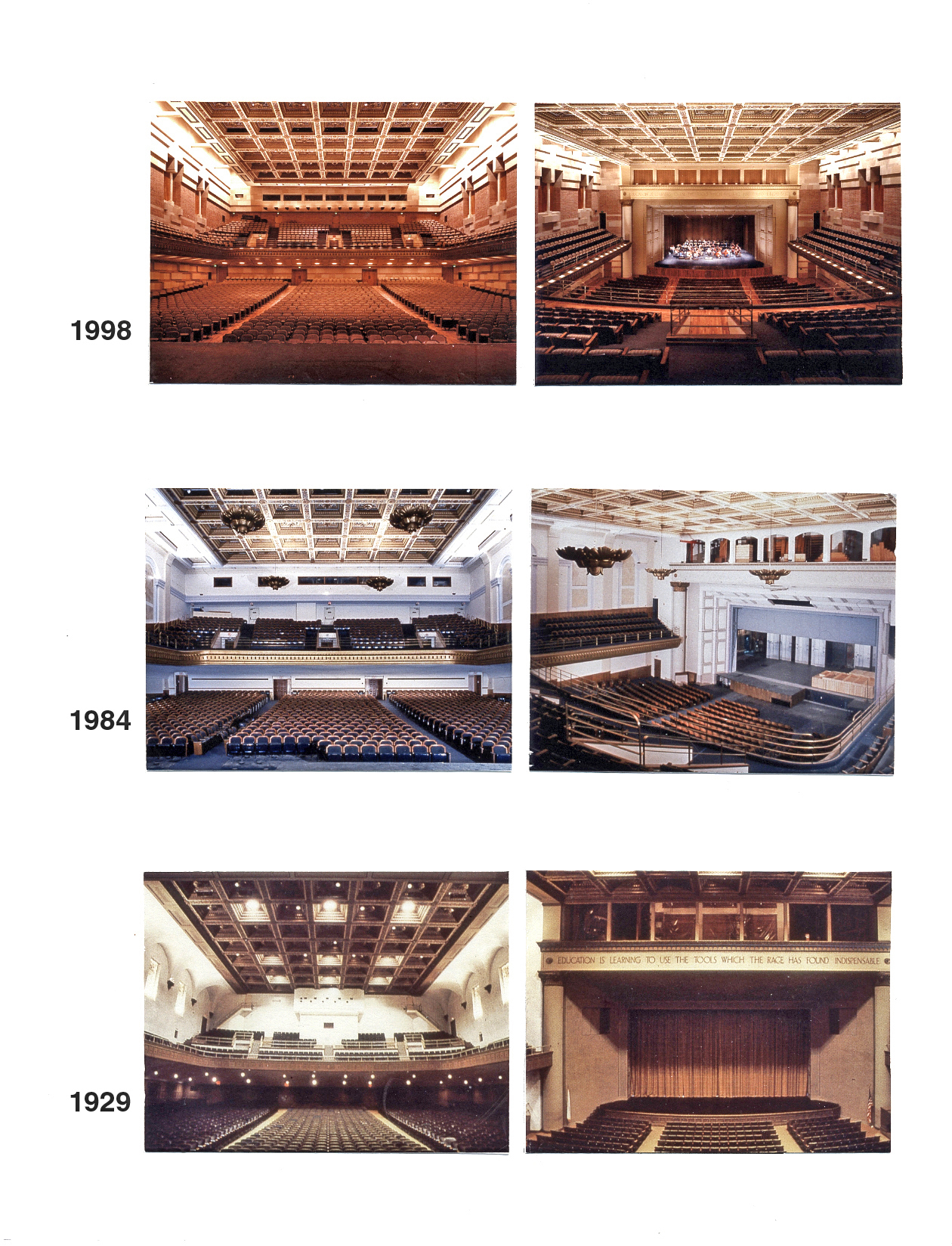
Auditorium: 1929, 1984 and 1998

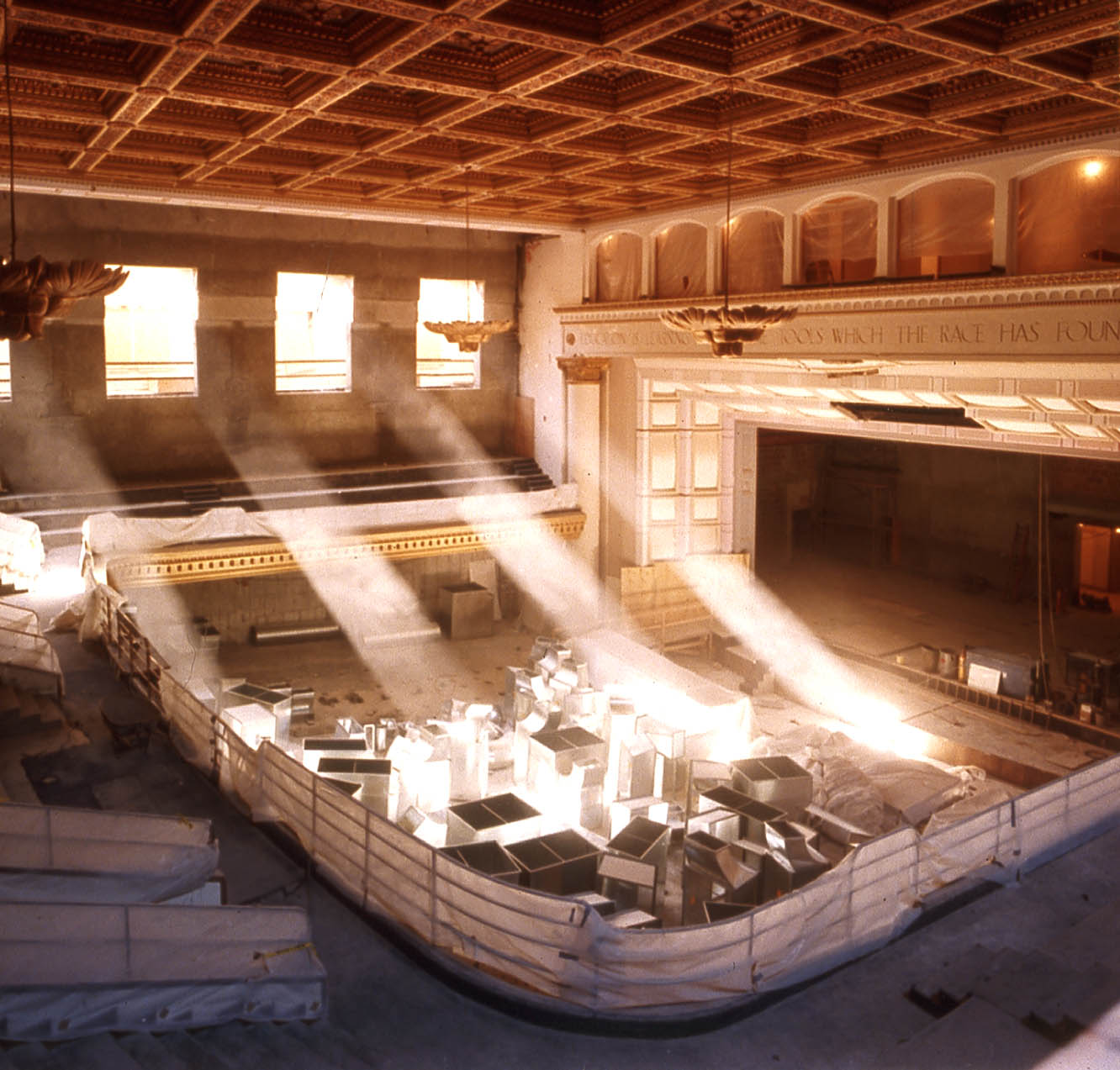
Auditorium during the Seismic Renovation, 1995

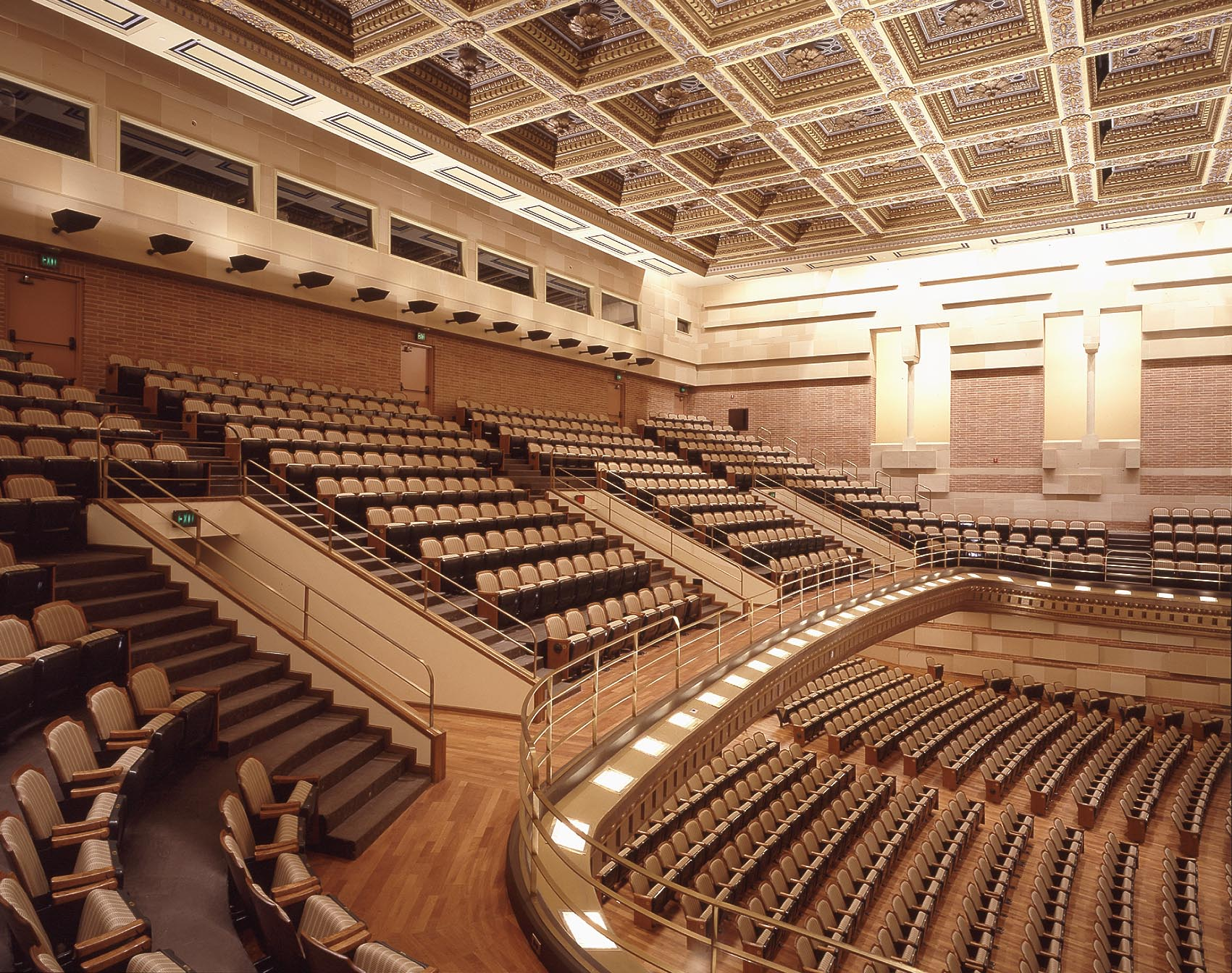
Auditorium, 1998

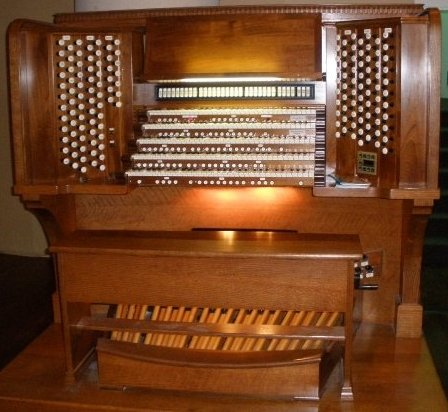
The console of the Royce Hall pipe organ

== Exterior and interior ==
Royce hall is a large seven-story brick building, excluding the basement and sub basement. Only the basement and the first three floors are open to the public, the large towers have seven floors. The main facade of the building consists of two wings and a central part.

The main part of the building also contains several technical levels above the third floor which contain theater equipment.

Above the stage is the inscription "Education is learning to use the tools which the race has found indispensable."

== Programs ==
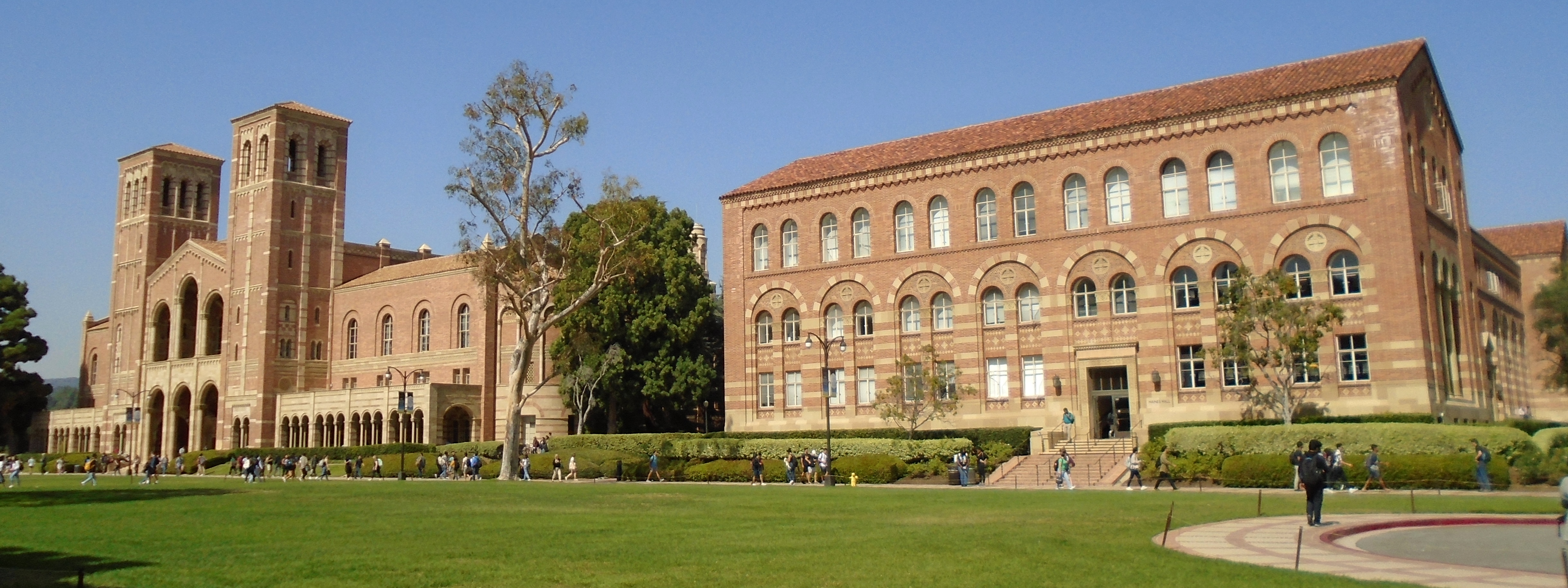
Royce Hall (left) and Haines Hall (right)

In 1936, University of California President Robert Gordon Sproul appointed a committee to oversee programming and in 1937, Royce Hall's first performing arts season was born. The first subscription series included the great contralto Marian Anderson, the Budapest String Quartet, and the Los Angeles Philharmonic. In addition to its world-renowned acoustics, the monument is a must-see for anyone who visits UCLA, especially because of its asymmetrical features.

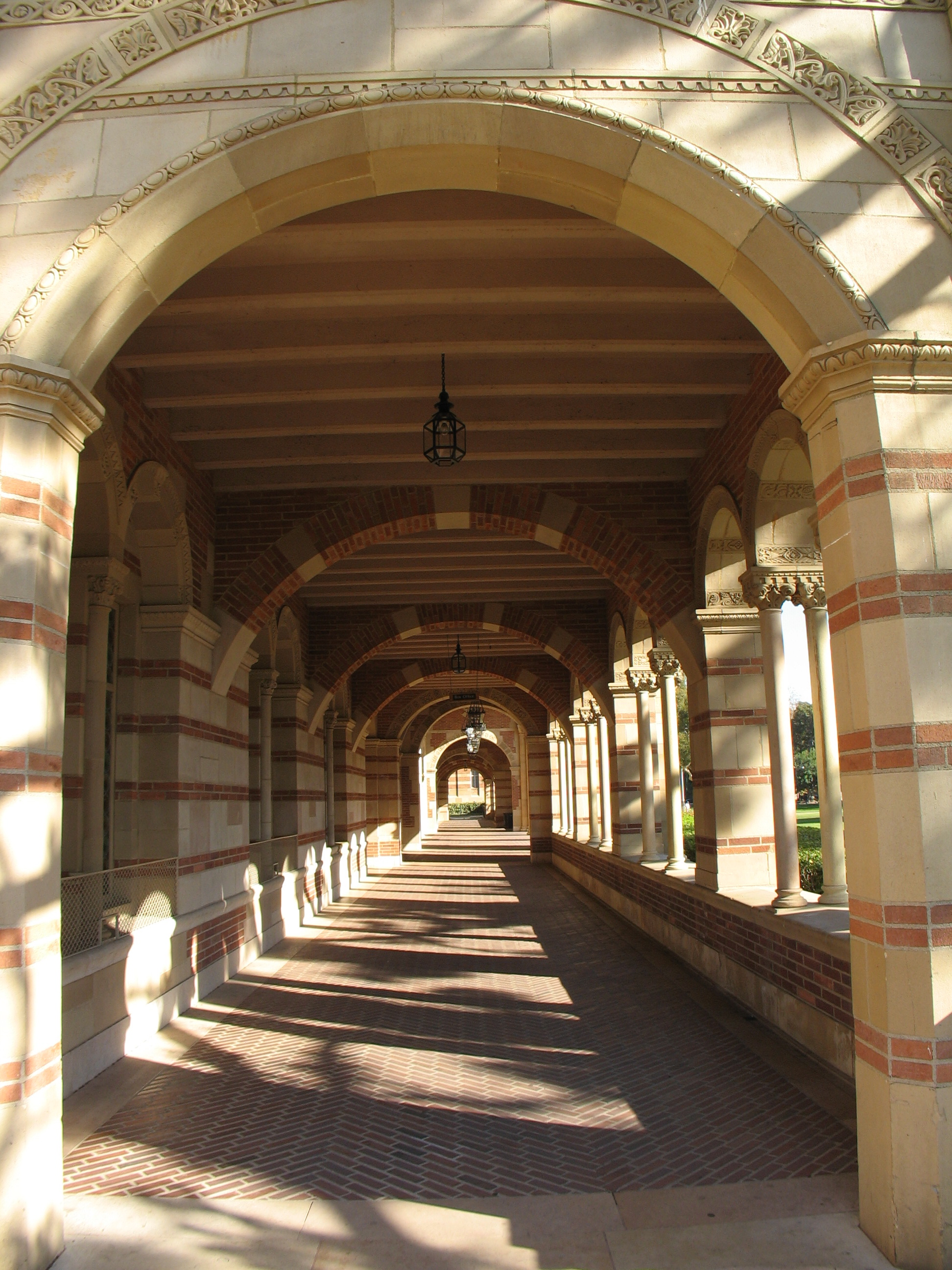
One of the Royce Hall's arcades

In 1960, Henri Temianka founded and conducted his "Let's Talk Music" series at Royce Hall; this orchestra became the California Chamber Symphony (CCS), which gave more than 100 concerts over the ensuing 23 years, including premieres of major works by such composers as Aaron Copland, Dmitri Shostakovich, Darius Milhaud, Alberto Ginastera, Gian Carlo Menotti and Malcolm Arnold. Soloists who performed with the CCS under Temianka's direction included David Oistrakh, Jean-Pierre Rampal and Benny Goodman. A "Concerts for Youth" series included participation by children from the audience.

Presentation of the annual Los Angeles Times book prizes were made during the Los Angeles Times Festival of Books in association with UCLA in Royce Hall from 1996-2010.

For many years, Royce Hall has been the venue of choice for various culture nights produced by cultural student organizations on campus, including Vietnamese Culture Night (VCN), Samahang Pilipino Cultural Night (SPCN), Chinese American Culture Night (CACN), and Korean Culture Night (KCN), among others.

In 2014, former Secretary of State Hillary Clinton delivered the Luskin Lecture for Thought Leadership at Royce Hall.

== Recording venue ==
Although not known for its acoustics prior to renovations in the 1980s, Royce Hall was the venue for a number of landmark recordings of the Los Angeles Philharmonic under the direction of Zubin Mehta. The recordings, made from 1967 through 1978 and recorded by the Decca label, were intended as hi-fi showpieces and contributed to the LA Phil's reputation for dazzle and glitz. Decca's engineers, initially under the supervision of John Culshaw, utilized two and a half tons of recording equipment in their efforts. To counter Royce Hall's disadvantageous acoustic profile, the engineers had a temporary stage platform constructed, which extended onto the floor of the hall to move the orchestra forward and to the center of the room; the platform was removed between recordings and reassembled as needed. The focal point of the Royce Hall recordings under Mehta were showpieces of the 19th and 20th centuries, including noteworthy recordings of Stravinsky's Petrushka (recorded in 1967) and The Rite of Spring (recorded in 1969), Tchaikovsky's Symphony No. 4 (recorded twice, in 1967 and 1976), Copland's Lincoln Portrait (recorded in 1968 with narrator Gregory Peck), Strauss's Also sprach Zarathustra (recorded in 1969) and An Alpine Symphony (recorded in 1976), Holst's The Planets (recorded in 1971), Dvořák's Symphony No. 8 and Symphony No. 9 (both recorded in 1975), and Mahler's Symphony No. 3 (recorded 1978; Mehta's final recording with the orchestra as music director). Although initially dismissed by classical music sophisticates, including contemporary reviewers in the Los Angeles Times, the Royce Hall recordings have subsequently become regarded as classics, with particular acclaim focusing on the later recordings. Subsequent to Mehta's tenure, the Philharmonic would return to Royce Hall for recordings with other labels, including Prokofiev's Symphony No. 1 and Symphony No. 5 (recorded in 1986; conducted by André Previn and released by Philips Classics), and Stravinsky's Violin Concerto (recorded in 1992; conducted by Esa-Pekka Salonen and released by Sony Classical).

Royce Hall has occasionally been used for the recording of film scores. Portions of John Williams' scores for A.I. Artificial Intelligence (2001) and Memoirs of a Geisha (2005) were recorded at the hall. Maurice Jarre recorded his score for the Japanese film The Setting Sun (1992) at the venue.

Starting in the 1960s and continuing to the present day, Royce Hall has also been utilized for the recording of contemporary popular music, specifically for live concert recordings. Ravi Shankar's early live album India's Most Distinguished Musician in Concert was recorded at the venue on November 19, 1961. Jazz bassist Charles Mingus recorded his live album Music Written for Monterey 1965 (1965) at UCLA after his planned session at the Monterey Jazz Festival that year was cut short. Neil Young's song "The Needle and the Damage Done", featured on the album Harvest, was recorded during a live performance on January 30, 1971. Frank Zappa recorded his live album Orchestral Favorites at the hall on September 19, 1975, although the album itself was not released until 1979. Portions of Earth, Wind & Fire's album Faces (1980) were recorded at the hall. Tori Amos recorded a live album, performed as part of her Original Sinsuality Tour and released as part of the set The Original Bootlegs (2005), at Royce Hall.

== In popular culture ==
- Some scenes from the film The Nutty Professor (1996) were filmed in the Royce Quad.
- In 1985, Patrick Stewart performed a demonstration of various plays at Royce Hall to aid a friend who was a member of the faculty. During this performance, television producer Robert Justman sat in attendance. Watching Stewart convinced him immediately that he was the right actor to portray Captain Jean-Luc Picard in Star Trek: The Next Generation.
- A Nightmare on Elm Street 3: Dream Warriors used the building for the exteriors of the Westin Hills Psychiatric Hospital.
- In Noah Hawley's 2012 novel The Good Father, a Presidential candidate is assassinated during a speech in Royce Hall.
