= Concertina (song) =

Single by Tori Amos

from the album To Venus and Back
- Released: February 8, 2000
- Recorded: March 1999
- Studio: Martian Engineering (Cornwall)
- Genre: Art pop; trip hop
- Length: 3:57
- Label: Atlantic
- Songwriter: Tori Amos
- Producer: Tori Amos

Tori Amos singles chronology
"Glory of the 80's" (1999)	"Concertina" (2000)	"Strange Little Girl" (2001)

"Concertina" is a song written and performed by American singer-songwriter and pianist Tori Amos, released as the fourth and last single from her fifth studio album To Venus and Back (1999). The commercial CD single was released in February 2000.

== Background and release ==
The title of the song refers to the musical instrument concertina. The lyrics use it as a metaphor to describe the experience of discomfort and unease in a social setting, likening it to being a squeezebox. When recording the song, Amos wanted to combine the acoustic piano with electronic drums, as she felt the dichotomy complimented the themes of the lyrics, which describe sensory discomfort in a "fierce calm" and being changed "particle by particle".

In the interview for her cover story in Alternative Press in October 1999, Amos commented on the content of the song:

Do you ever feel like you walk in a room, and you don't know why, but you're just so uncomfortable you're crawling out of your skin, even though nobody's touched you, physically? That's in "Concertina", when you feel like you haven't excavated enough of your different personalities that when one pops up, you're not sure where it came from, and you try to hack it out of yourself. It shocks you that you could have this kind of fault, or that other people could bring it out in you.

Since 1999, the song has been featured in all of Amos' world tours, except the 2005 Original Sinsuality Tour in support of The Beekeeper.

"Concertina" was included on the setlist for the DVD release of Amos' concert for Live from the Artists Den in 2010.

== Track listing ==
Enhanced CD single, February 8, 2000:

1. Concertina (The single mix) 3:58
2. Famous Blue Raincoat (Live) 5:24
3. Twinkle (Live) 2:49
4. Music video for "Glory of the 80s"

Promotional CD single, February 8, 2000:

1. Concertina (The single mix) 3:57
2. Concertina (The album mix) 3:57

== Promotion and chart performance ==
No music video was filmed for the song. A promo CD single featuring both the single and album mix of the song was released to radio stations. Concertina was performed live on the television show Later... with Jools Holland. The song was featured in setlists during Amos' 1999 concert tour in support of the album.

Title	Chart	Position
"Concertina" (2000)	US AAA	18
"Concertina" (2000)	Billboard Hot 100 Singles Sales (U.S.)	48
