= Legs and Boots =

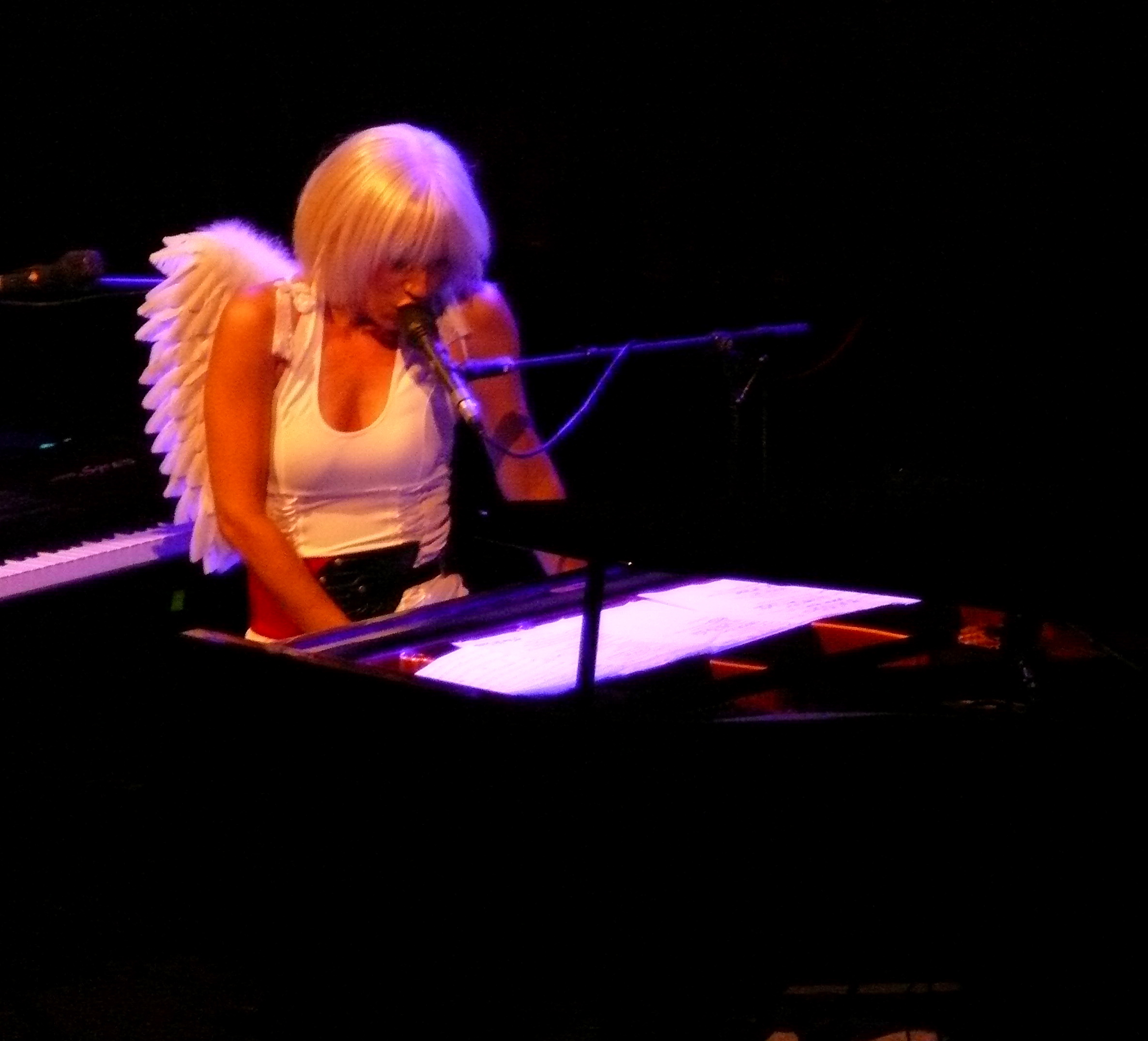
- Amos performing as the Santa persona in Pittsburgh, Pennsylvania on October 30, 2007.

Live album by Tori Amos
- Released: 2007, 2008
- Recorded: October 13, 2007 – December 12, 2007
- Genre: Alternative rock
- Labels: Epic; Sony BMG

Tori Amos live chronology
The Original Bootlegs (2005)	Legs and Boots (2007)	Live at Montreux 1991/1992 (2008)

Legs and Boots is a series of Tori Amos live albums recorded during the North American leg of the American Doll Posse Tour. Amos announced the launch of the series on October 16, 2007, stating that each show in the series would be available via digital download in MP3 format within a few hours after each show, and in CD-quality FLAC format within a week. Some sets contained photos from backstage or onstage from the concert, some also contained soundcheck recordings as extras. A total of 27 shows were recorded from October 13 to December 12, 2007. All 27 shows were made available on iTunes USA on July 22, 2008, and on iTunes international, Rhapsody, Napster, and other online vendors on August 5.

== Shows ==
Syracuse, NY Oct 13 07
No.	Title	Length
1.	"Bouncing off Clouds"	6:16
2.	"Little Earthquakes"	7:33
3.	"Juárez"	4:24
4.	"Beauty of Speed"	5:01
5.	"Roosterspur Bridge"	4:28
6.	"Professional Widow"	4:46
7.	"Big Wheel"	4:16
8.	"Parasol"	4:33
9.	"Spark"	4:56
10.	"Improv - Spank That Ass"	3:44
11.	"Cornflake Girl"	6:41
12.	"Northern Lad"	5:32
13.	"Caught a Lite Sneeze"	6:58
14.	"Improv"	3:15
15.	"Yes, Anastasia"	6:08
16.	"Never Seen Blue"	5:04
17.	"1000 Oceans"	4:52
18.	"Taxi Ride"	6:16
19.	"Code Red"	7:21
20.	"Precious Things"	7:18
21.	"Tear in Your Hand"	6:07
22.	"Hey Jupiter"	7:42
Total length:		123:11

Philadelphia, PA Oct 15 07
No.	Title	Length
1.	"Body and Soul"	5:47
2.	"Sugar"	5:18
3.	"Hoochie Woman"	5:30
4.	"Dragon"	5:42
5.	"You Can Bring Your Dog"	4:43
6.	"Secret Spell"	4:22
7.	"Professional Widow"	4:28
8.	"Big Wheel"	4:09
9.	"Crucify"	7:20
10.	"Spark"	5:04
11.	"Cornflake Girl"	8:12
12.	"Purple People"	5:49
13.	"Liquid Diamonds"	7:13
14.	"Improv"	3:31
15.	"Leather"	4:09
16.	"Cloud on My Tongue"	6:46
17.	"1000 Oceans"	4:50
18.	"Hotel"	6:36
19.	"Code Red"	7:18
20.	"Precious Things"	6:56
21.	"Pancake"	5:30
22.	"Bouncing off Clouds"	5:57
23.	"Hey Jupiter"	6:57
24.	"Tear in Your Hand - From Sound Check"	5:34
Total length:		137:41

Boston, MA Oct 18 07
No.	Title	Length
1.	"Cruel"	7:39
2.	"Bliss"	4:01
3.	"Fat Slut"	0:43
4.	"Smokey Joe"	7:20
5.	"Teenage Hustling"	4:10
6.	"Waitress"	7:53
7.	"Professional Widow"	6:11
8.	"Big Wheel"	4:24
9.	"Crucify"	7:47
10.	"Concertina"	5:17
11.	"Cornflake Girl"	7:24
12.	"Putting the Damage On"	6:03
13.	"Take to the Sky"	7:28
14.	"Improv - Miss Massachusetts"	6:13
15.	"Jackie's Strength"	5:53
16.	"Etienne"	5:32
17.	"Virginia"	4:52
18.	"Hotel"	6:22
19.	"Code Red"	7:27
20.	"Precious Things"	7:44
21.	"Digital Ghost"	5:09
22.	"Bouncing off Clouds"	6:11
23.	"Hey Jupiter"	7:23
24.	"Seaside - From Sound Check"	5:04
Total length:		148:09

Boston, MA Oct 19 07
No.	Title	Length
1.	"Bouncing off Clouds"	6:33
2.	"Little Earthquakes"	7:40
3.	"Juárez"	4:42
4.	"Little Amsterdam"	5:53
5.	"Beauty of Speed"	5:08
6.	"Girl Disappearing"	4:54
7.	"Professional Widow"	6:36
8.	"Big Wheel"	4:16
9.	"Space Dog"	7:21
10.	"Sugar"	5:20
11.	"Cornflake Girl"	8:03
12.	"Bells for Her"	9:26
13.	"Improv - He Has a Well, You Have an Ocean"	4:16
14.	"Spring Haze"	5:56
15.	"Improv - I Like My Bus"	3:55
16.	"China"	6:05
17.	"Merman"	5:09
18.	"Northern Lad"	5:36
19.	"A Sorta Fairytale"	6:18
20.	"Code Red"	7:54
21.	"Precious Things"	8:15
22.	"Parasol"	5:21
23.	"God"	5:45
24.	"Hey Jupiter"	7:47
Total length:		148:09

Montreal, QC Oct 21 07
No.	Title	Length
1.	"Yo George"	2:49
2.	"Sweet Dreams"	4:18
3.	"In the Springtime of His Voodoo"	5:24
4.	"Almost Rosey"	5:40
5.	"Devils and Gods"	3:50
6.	"Tombigbee"	5:05
7.	"Scarlet's Walk"	5:51
8.	"Professional Widow"	5:31
9.	"Big Wheel"	4:01
10.	"Crucify"	7:35
11.	"Sugar"	5:06
12.	"Cornflake Girl"	7:23
13.	"Playboy Mommy"	4:29
14.	"Caught a Lite Sneeze"	5:58
15.	"Improv - C'est Bon"	2:59
16.	"Baker Baker"	4:12
17.	"Garlands"	8:28
18.	"Digital Ghost"	4:23
19.	"Spark"	4:54
20.	"Code Red"	7:49
21.	"Precious Things"	6:49
22.	"Tear in Your Hand"	5:56
23.	"Hey Jupiter"	7:42
Total length:		126:12

Toronto, ON Oct 23 07
No.	Title	Length
1.	"Cruel"	7:01
2.	"Bliss"	3:51
3.	"Fat Slut"	0:48
4.	"Smokey Joe"	6:47
5.	"Teenage Hustling"	4:10
6.	"Waitress"	7:40
7.	"Professional Widow"	5:35
8.	"Big Wheel"	4:02
9.	"Space Dog"	6:52
10.	"Spark"	4:54
11.	"Cornflake Girl"	7:01
12.	"Liquid Diamonds"	7:40
13.	"Glory of the 80s"	5:11
14.	"Improv - When Your Kid is Smarter than You"	2:29
15.	"Take Me With You"	5:23
16.	"Winter"	8:45
17.	"Horses"	4:27
18.	"A Sorta Fairytale"	6:20
19.	"Code Red"	6:57
20.	"Precious Things"	7:40
21.	"Bouncing off Clouds"	5:24
22.	"Hey Jupiter"	7:11
Total length:		126:08

Buffalo, NY Oct 24 07
No.	Title	Length
1.	"Bouncing off Clouds"	6:07
2.	"Little Earthquakes"	7:41
3.	"Juárez"	4:31
4.	"Upside Down"	4:51
5.	"Beauty of Speed"	5:00
6.	"Girl Disappearing"	4:50
7.	"Professional Widow"	4:43
8.	"Big Wheel"	4:26
9.	"Sugar"	5:09
10.	"A Sorta Fairytale"	6:20
11.	"Cornflake Girl"	7:32
12.	"Improv - Matty What Did You Have for Dinner"	2:07
13.	"Your Cloud"	6:31
14.	"Take to the Sky"	7:18
15.	"Cloud on My Tongue"	8:11
16.	"Here in My Head"	5:27
17.	"Virginia"	5:01
18.	"Concertina"	5:02
19.	"Code Red"	7:46
20.	"Precious Things"	6:46
21.	"Taxi Ride"	5:01
22.	"Hey Jupiter"	7:30
Total length:		127:50

Washington, DC Oct 26 07
No.	Title	Length
1.	"Yo George"	2:57
2.	"In the Springtime of His Voodoo"	5:53
3.	"Devils and Gods"	4:01
4.	"Almost Rosey"	5:46
5.	"Tombigbee"	5:12
6.	"Scarlet's Walk"	5:48
7.	"Professional Widow"	7:22
8.	"Big Wheel"	3:58
9.	"Parasol"	4:49
10.	"Hotel"	6:31
11.	"Cornflake Girl"	7:14
12.	"Improv - Divided"	2:35
13.	"Bells for Her"	8:07
14.	"Spring Haze"	6:37
15.	"Leather"	4:33
16.	"Jackie's Strength"	5:39
17.	"1000 Oceans"	4:46
18.	"Concertina"	5:22
19.	"Code Red"	7:28
20.	"Precious Things"	7:59
21.	"Pancake"	5:32
22.	"Bouncing off Clouds"	5:38
23.	"Hey Jupiter"	7:02
Total length:		130:49

Detroit, MI Oct 27 07
No.	Title	Length
1.	"Body and Soul"	5:36
2.	"My Posse Can Do"	4:52
3.	"She's Your Cocaine"	4:01
4.	"Dragon"	5:59
5.	"Secret Spell"	4:22
6.	"You Can Bring Your Dog"	4:19
7.	"Professional Widow"	4:56
8.	"Big Wheel"	4:26
9.	"A Sorta Fairytale"	6:08
10.	"Black Dove (January)"	4:45
11.	"Crucify"	7:38
12.	"Cornflake Girl"	7:21
13.	"Honey"	6:24
14.	"Siren"	7:16
15.	"Baker Baker"	4:41
16.	"Cloud on My Tongue"	6:17
17.	"Carbon"	5:50
18.	"Horses"	4:44
19.	"Spark"	5:03
20.	"Code Red"	7:25
21.	"Precious Things"	7:29
22.	"Hey Jupiter"	6:51
Total length:		126:23

Pittsburgh, PA Oct 30 07
No.	Title	Length
1.	"Body and Soul"	6:07
2.	"Hoochie Woman"	5:27
3.	"Dragon"	5:45
4.	"Secret Spell"	4:27
5.	"She's Your Cocaine"	3:59
6.	"You Can Bring Your Dog"	4:24
7.	"Professional Widow"	5:09
8.	"Big Wheel"	4:43
9.	"Father Lucifer"	6:36
10.	"Sugar"	4:51
11.	"Cornflake Girl"	7:42
12.	"Putting the Damage On"	6:03
13.	"Caught a Lite Sneeze"	5:56
14.	"Mr. Zebra"	4:13
15.	"Silent All These Years"	6:21
16.	"Sister Janet"	4:52
17.	"Digital Ghost"	4:34
18.	"Happy Phantom"	4:34
19.	"Code Red"	7:46
20.	"Precious Things"	7:02
21.	"Bouncing Off Clouds"	5:51
22.	"Hey Jupiter"	7:51
Total length:		123:37

Cleveland, OH Nov 01 07
No.	Title	Length
1.	"Cruel"	6:59
2.	"Bliss"	3:57
3.	"Fat Slut"	0:50
4.	"Smokey Joe"	6:25
5.	"Blood Roses"	5:25
6.	"Teenage Hustling"	4:11
7.	"Waitress"	7:25
8.	"Professional Widow"	5:26
9.	"Big Wheel"	3:59
10.	"Crucify"	7:17
11.	"Tear in Your Hand"	5:25
12.	"Cornflake Girl"	7:31
13.	"Northern Lad"	5:44
14.	"Take to the Sky"	7:25
15.	"Improv - Ohioans"	1:45
16.	"Cool on Your Island"	4:52
17.	"Leather"	4:05
18.	"Concertina"	5:09
19.	"Spark"	5:02
20.	"Code Red"	7:24
21.	"Precious Things"	7:29
22.	"Hotel"	6:52
23.	"Bouncing off Clouds"	5:42
24.	"Hey Jupiter"	7:10
Total length:		133:29

Indianapolis, IN Nov 02 07
No.	Title	Length
1.	"Yo George"	4:33
2.	"In the Springtime of His Voodoo"	5:56
3.	"Sweet Dreams"	4:14
4.	"Sweet Sangria"	4:30
5.	"Tombigbee"	4:39
6.	"Almost Rosey"	5:41
7.	"Scarlet's Walk"	5:44
8.	"Professional Widow"	5:43
9.	"Big Wheel"	4:17
10.	"Sugar"	5:03
11.	"Black Dove (January)"	5:26
12.	"Cornflake Girl"	7:27
13.	"Bells for her"	8:37
14.	"Liquid Diamonds"	7:02
15.	"Improv - Indiana"	3:49
16.	"Crazy"	4:41
17.	"Mother"	7:21
18.	"Virginia"	4:50
19.	"Space Dog"	7:22
20.	"Code Red"	7:48
21.	"Precious Things"	7:40
22.	"Bouncing Off Clouds"	5:52
Total length:		128:15

Milwaukee, WI Nov 03 07
No.	Title	Length
1.	"Bouncing off Clouds"	6:32
2.	"Little Earthquakes"	7:43
3.	"Juárez"	4:14
4.	"Upside Down"	4:41
5.	"Beauty of Speed"	5:04
6.	"Roosterspur Bridge"	4:25
7.	"Professional Widow"	5:08
8.	"Big Wheel"	4:17
9.	"Crucify"	6:55
10.	"Pancake"	4:39
11.	"Cornflake Girl"	7:37
12.	"Lust"	4:49
13.	"Siren"	6:29
14.	"Winter"	8:26
15.	"Strange/Improv - I Fucked This Up"	2:42
16.	"Carbon"	5:59
17.	"Horses"	4:34
18.	"Father Lucifer"	6:40
19.	"Code Red"	7:14
20.	"Precious Things"	6:04
21.	"Tear in Your Hand"	5:27
Total length:		119:39

Chicago, IL Nov 05 07
No.	Title	Length
1.	"Body and Soul"	5:50
2.	"She's Your Cocaine"	3:38
3.	"Improv - This Is My Town / Dragon"	6:51
4.	"Secret Spell"	4:25
5.	"You Can Bring Your Dog"	4:23
6.	"Raspberry Swirl"	4:46
7.	"Professional Widow"	5:05
8.	"Big Wheel"	4:10
9.	"Concertina"	5:23
10.	"Tear in Your Hand"	5:09
11.	"Cornflake Girl"	7:12
12.	"Your Cloud"	6:41
13.	"Take to the Sky"	7:44
14.	"Improv - Everybody Knows The Trouble I've Seen"	4:58
15.	"China"	6:11
16.	"Cooling"	6:29
17.	"1000 Oceans"	4:46
18.	"Hotel"	8:57
19.	"Code Red"	7:06
20.	"Precious Things"	5:50
21.	"Hey Jupiter"	5:37
Total length:		121:11

Chicago, IL Nov 06 07
No.	Title	Length
1.	"Cruel"	7:29
2.	"Bliss"	4:01
3.	"Teenage Hustling"	4:06
4.	"Fat Slut"	0:48
5.	"Smokey Joe"	6:30
6.	"Waitress"	7:34
7.	"Me and a Gun"	5:24
8.	"Professional Widow"	5:53
9.	"Big Wheel"	4:05
10.	"Sugar"	4:58
11.	"Almost Rosey"	5:39
12.	"Cornflake Girl"	7:26
13.	"Liquid Diamonds"	6:40
14.	"Caught a Lite Sneeze"	5:58
15.	"Winter"	8:35
16.	"Don't Fuck This Up/Happy Phantom"	5:32
17.	"Digital Ghost"	4:17
18.	"Hotel"	6:50
19.	"Code Red"	7:35
20.	"Precious Things"	6:45
21.	"Bouncing off Clouds"	5:22
22.	"Hey Jupiter"	7:20
Total length:		128:47

Lawrence, KS Nov 09 07
No.	Title	Length
1.	"Bouncing off Clouds"	6:19
2.	"Little Earthquakes"	7:43
3.	"Juárez"	4:15
4.	"Little Amsterdam"	5:48
5.	"Beauty of Speed"	4:45
6.	"Girl Disappearing"	4:54
7.	"Professional Widow"	7:36
8.	"Big Wheel"	4:19
9.	"Crucify"	7:15
10.	"Sugar"	4:51
11.	"Cornflake Girl"	7:18
12.	"Improv - Excuse Me I Need a Little Help"	0:56
13.	"Mother Revolution"	5:00
14.	"Caught a Lite Sneeze"	5:35
15.	"Frog on My Toe"	3:32
16.	"Mother"	7:18
17.	"Virginia"	4:34
18.	"A Sorta Fairytale"	6:18
19.	"Code Red"	7:32
20.	"Precious Things"	6:39
21.	"Hey Jupiter"	6:52
Total length:		119:19

Nashville, TN Nov 12 07
No.	Title	Length
1.	"Yo George"	3:00
2.	"Sweet Dreams"	4:10
3.	"Sweet Sangria"	4:40
4.	"In the Springtime of His Voodoo"	5:55
5.	"Almost Rosey"	5:45
6.	"Tombigbee"	4:50
7.	"Scarlet's Walk"	5:39
8.	"Professional Widow"	4:48
9.	"Big Wheel"	4:09
10.	"Concertina"	4:43
11.	"The Power of Orange Knickers"	3:58
12.	"Cornflake Girl"	7:31
13.	"Putting the Damage On"	6:07
14.	"Glory of the '80s"	5:05
15.	"Improv - Dixieland"	2:59
16.	"Cooling"	6:32
17.	"Cool on Your Island"	5:06
18.	"1000 Oceans"	4:43
19.	"Hotel"	5:54
20.	"Code Red"	7:20
21.	"Precious Things"	6:27
22.	"A Sorta Fairytale"	7:04
23.	"Bouncing Off Clouds"	5:49
Total length:		122:14

Fort Myers, FL Nov 17 07
No.	Title	Length
1.	"Yo George"	2:57
2.	"Mountain"	3:25
3.	"Sweet Dreams"	3:47
4.	"Sweet Sangria"	4:40
5.	"In the Springtime of His Voodoo"	5:34
6.	"Tombigbee"	4:43
7.	"Scarlet's Walk"	5:35
8.	"Professional Widow"	5:19
9.	"Big Wheel"	4:09
10.	"Pancake"	4:33
11.	"Tear in Your Hand"	5:06
12.	"Cornflake Girl"	7:06
13.	"Amber Waves"	4:22
14.	"Glory of the '80s"	5:08
15.	"Seaside"	5:00
16.	"Silent All These Years"	5:41
17.	"Suede"	5:15
18.	"Black Dove (January)"	4:59
19.	"Code Red"	7:45
20.	"Precious Things"	6:56
21.	"A Sorta Fairytale"	7:05
22.	"Bouncing Off Clouds"	5:42
23.	"Hey Jupiter"	6:54
Total length:		121:41

Melbourne, FL Nov 18 07
No.	Title	Length
1.	"Bouncing off Clouds"	6:16
2.	"Little Earthquakes"	7:52
3.	"Juárez"	4:22
4.	"Upside Down"	4:48
5.	"Beauty of Speed"	4:44
6.	"Little Amsterdam"	6:46
7.	"Professional Widow"	5:50
8.	"Big Wheel"	4:30
9.	"Father Lucifer"	6:33
10.	"Digital Ghost"	4:17
11.	"Improv - Pass the Chicken"	1:27
12.	"Cornflake Girl"	7:03
13.	"Improv - You're a Diamond"	1:51
14.	"Liquid Diamonds"	7:13
15.	"Honey"	4:42
16.	"Marianne"	5:33
17.	"Improv - Shining/Twinkle"	6:22
18.	"The Beekeeper"	7:26
19.	"Taxi Ride"	4:18
20.	"Code Red"	7:16
21.	"Precious Things"	7:21
22.	"Tear in Your Hand"	6:04
23.	"Hey Jupiter"	7:08
Total length:		129:42

Clearwater, FL Nov 20 07
No.	Title	Length
1.	"Cruel"	7:12
2.	"Professional Widow (LP version)"	6:03
3.	"Fat Slut"	0:45
4.	"Smokey Joe"	7:07
5.	"Teenage Hustling"	4:10
6.	"Waitress"	8:09
7.	"Professional Widow"	5:14
8.	"Big Wheel"	4:30
9.	"God"	4:51
10.	"Horses"	4:24
11.	"Cornflake Girl"	7:20
12.	"Martha's Foolish Ginger"	5:09
13.	"Siren"	6:17
14.	"Improv - Forgot to be Brave"	2:52
15.	"Carbon"	5:54
16.	"Never Seen Blue"	3:49
17.	"Black Dove"	5:06
18.	"A Sorta Fairytale"	6:18
19.	"Code Red"	7:26
20.	"Precious Things"	7:36
21.	"Bouncing off Clouds"	5:46
22.	"Hey Jupiter"	8:14
Total length:		124:12

West Palm Beach, FL Nov 21 07
No.	Title	Length
1.	"Body and Soul"	5:49
2.	"She's Your Cocaine"	3:30
3.	"Hoochie Woman"	5:28
4.	"Secret Spell"	4:17
5.	"You Can Bring Your Dog"	4:31
6.	"Raspberry Swirl"	4:33
7.	"Professional Widow"	5:19
8.	"Big Wheel"	4:27
9.	"Space Dog"	6:53
10.	"Hotel"	5:56
11.	"Improv - Mary's House"	1:59
12.	"Cornflake Girl"	7:44
13.	"Your Cloud"	6:20
14.	"Spring Haze"	6:22
15.	"Amazing Grace"	3:49
16.	"Gold Dust"	6:30
17.	"Josephine"	2:41
18.	"Sugar"	5:08
19.	"Code Red"	7:14
20.	"Precious Things"	6:53
21.	"Bouncing off Clouds"	5:25
22.	"Digital Ghost"	5:09
Total length:		115:57

Dallas, TX Nov 24 07
No.	Title	Length
1.	"Body and Soul"	5:46
2.	"She's Your Cocaine"	3:33
3.	"Sweet the Sting"	6:31
4.	"Sugar"	5:15
5.	"Secret Spell"	4:14
6.	"Raspberry Swirl"	4:26
7.	"Professional Widow"	5:00
8.	"Big Wheel"	4:27
9.	"Father Lucifer"	6:30
10.	"Tear in Your Hand"	5:34
11.	"Cornflake Girl"	8:12
12.	"Lust"	4:44
13.	"Liquid Diamonds"	6:48
14.	"Improv - Stop Sign"	3:12
15.	"Jackie's Strength"	5:55
16.	"Beulah Land"	3:46
17.	"Horses"	4:25
18.	"Bliss"	3:34
19.	"Code Red"	7:33
20.	"Precious Things"	7:18
21.	"Digital Ghost"	4:59
22.	"Bouncing off Clouds"	6:12
Total length:		118:04

Houston, TX Nov 25 07
No.	Title	Length
1.	"Bouncing off Clouds"	6:19
2.	"Little Earthquakes"	7:52
3.	"Juárez"	4:10
4.	"Mary"	4:54
5.	"Little Amsterdam"	5:47
6.	"Beauty of Speed"	4:44
7.	"Professional Widow"	5:34
8.	"Big Wheel"	4:43
9.	"Space Dog"	6:59
10.	"Pancake"	4:22
11.	"Cornflake Girl"	7:16
12.	"Doughnut Song"	9:04
13.	"Glory of the 80s"	5:10
14.	"Improv - Burn Until Then"	4:20
15.	"Cloud on My Tongue"	6:27
16.	"Peeping Tommi"	4:51
17.	"Virginia"	5:09
18.	"Black Dove"	5:06
19.	"Code Red"	7:07
20.	"Precious Things"	6:29
21.	"Not David Bowie"	5:01
22.	"Hey Jupiter"	7:06
Total length:		128:30

Boise, ID Nov 30 07
No.	Title	Length
1.	"Bouncing off Clouds"	6:11
2.	"Little Earthquakes"	7:34
3.	"Juárez"	4:24
4.	"Upside Down"	4:56
5.	"Mary"	4:52
6.	"Beauty of Speed"	4:55
7.	"Professional Widow"	5:40
8.	"Big Wheel"	4:37
9.	"A Sorta Fairytale"	6:23
10.	"Tear in Your Hand"	5:30
11.	"Cornflake Girl"	7:26
12.	"Improv - A Spud Not a Stud"	3:02
13.	"Putting the Damage On"	5:40
14.	"Improv - Rolene Reprise"	3:01
15.	"Not the Red Baron"	4:20
16.	"Black Swan"	3:40
17.	"Black Dove"	5:10
18.	"Bliss"	3:49
19.	"Code Red"	7:34
20.	"Precious Things"	6:54
21.	"Concertina"	5:43
22.	"Hey Jupiter"	7:34
Total length:		118:55

Vancouver, BC Dec 03 07
No.	Title	Length
1.	"Body and Soul"	5:55
2.	"She's Your Cocaine"	3:32
3.	"Bug a Martini"	6:20
4.	"You Can Bring Your Dog"	4:18
5.	"Secret Spell"	4:25
6.	"Raspberry Swirl"	4:14
7.	"Professional Widow"	5:20
8.	"Big Wheel"	4:28
9.	"Crucify"	7:23
10.	"Pancake"	4:40
11.	"Improv - If This Keeps Goin' Like This"	1:02
12.	"Cornflake Girl"	7:15
13.	"Doughnut Song"	9:40
14.	"Siren"	6:41
15.	"Winter"	8:14
16.	"Ruby Through the Looking-Glass"	6:24
17.	"The Beekeeper"	7:48
18.	"Bliss"	3:30
19.	"Code Red"	7:35
20.	"Precious Things"	7:22
Total length:		116:16

Phoenix, AZ Dec 11 07
No.	Title	Length
1.	"Bouncing off Clouds"	6:18
2.	"Little Earthquakes"	8:01
3.	"Juárez"	4:26
4.	"Little Amsterdam"	6:01
5.	"Upside Down"	4:49
6.	"Beauty of Speed"	4:42
7.	"Professional Widow"	6:05
8.	"Big Wheel"	4:34
9.	"Sweet Sangria"	4:44
10.	"Space Dog"	7:00
11.	"Cornflake Girl"	7:59
12.	"Purple People"	4:56
13.	"Concertina"	5:05
14.	"Improv - Prayer for Rolene"	4:52
15.	"Silent All These Years"	5:34
16.	"Black Swan"	3:01
17.	"Northern Lad"	4:56
18.	"Father Lucifer"	6:01
19.	"Code Red"	7:27
20.	"Precious Things"	6:53
21.	"Tear in Your Hand"	5:49
22.	"The Beekeeper"	9:04
Total length:		128:17

San Diego, CA Dec 12 07
No.	Title	Length
1.	"Body and Soul"	5:42
2.	"She's Your Cocaine"	3:33
3.	"Hoochie Woman"	4:44
4.	"Raspberry Swirl"	5:30
5.	"Yo George"	3:52
6.	"Mountain"	3:14
7.	"Tombigbee"	4:46
8.	"Scarlet's Walk"	5:52
9.	"Professional Widow"	4:03
10.	"Big Wheel"	4:17
11.	"Cornflake Girl"	7:26
12.	"Doughnut Song"	9:25
13.	"Twinkle"	4:17
14.	"Leather"	4:05
15.	"Your Cloud"	6:46
16.	"Virginia"	4:59
17.	"Code Red"	11:05
18.	"Precious Things"	6:42
19.	"Bliss"	4:27
20.	"Space Dog"	5:44
21.	"Hey Jupiter"	6:57
Total length:		117:26

== Bonus Tracks ==
Two tracks from the tour, but not released for purchase as part of Legs And Boots were freely made available in December 2007 via Tori's official mailing list for mp3 download. These tracks were "Not David Bowie" (performed 28 November 2007 in Denver, Colorado) and "Amber Waves" (Performed 29 November 2007 in Salt Lake City, Utah).

== Artwork ==
The artwork included in each release corresponds with the persona or "doll" Amos used during the first part of the respective concert.

Cover of Syracuse, NY Oct 13 07, showing the Clyde doll.

Cover of Philadelphia, PA Oct 15 07, showing the Santa doll.

Cover of Boston, MA Oct 18 07, showing the Pip doll.

Cover of Montreal, QC Oct 21 07, showing the Isabel doll.

== Personnel ==
- Tori Amos – vocals, piano, organ, keyboard
- Dan Phelps – guitar, congas, mandolin
- Jon Evans – bass
- Matt Chamberlain – drums
