= Glory of the 80's =

1999 single by Tori Amos

- Standard artwork for international releases

Single by Tori Amos

from the album To Venus and Back
- Released: October 11, 1999
- Studio: Martian Engineering (Cornwall)
- Length: 4:01
- Label: Atlantic
- Songwriter: Tori Amos
- Producer: Tori Amos

Tori Amos singles chronology
"1000 Oceans" (1999)	"Glory of the 80's" (1999)	"Concertina" (2000)

"Glory of the 80's" is a song by American singer-songwriter and pianist Tori Amos. It is the fourth track on her fifth album, To Venus and Back. The song was issued as the first single from the album in Europe and Australasia. The song debuted and peaked at number 46 on the UK singles chart, making it Amos's lowest debut since her 1994 single God", when both parts of the single were recalled early for a misprint in the credits. In Australia, the single peaked at number 81 on the ARIA Singles Chart, becoming Amos' final single to reach the top 100 there.

== About ==
"Glory of the 80's" is an electronically driven song with a dark, club-like atmosphere. The song also marks the final appearance of the harpsichord in Amos' work until her 2009 holiday album Midwinter Graces. According to Amos, the song was written about the honesty of that decade, compared to the more conservative 1990s of censorship and political correctness. She said of the song:

"Mainly the honesty of the decadence of that decade. There's the line 'and then, just when it all seemed clear you go and disappear'. I knew a lot of great people in the eighties but at the time I didn't always understand them. Now, there's such a void in the art world, people with vision have physically passed on. It's also a stab at political correctness – you can't say this, you can't say that; now everybody has to be called a Spanish American, an African American and I mean, [getting worked up] Oh bloody, fucking hell!!! I understand the abuses that have happened and I absolutely think recompense should be paid, but you don't do it just on a surface level. Everybody thinks that the debt has been paid to the 'quote unquote' Indians who had their land taken away from them because we call them Native Americans. It's hard when everything is so eggshell, eggshell, eggshell. I do miss the eighties. It was great, knowing that friends were on one hand dialing a charity and on the other hand doing a line of blow—but not lying about it, being honest. None of us are this light and dark fantasy. What's dark to you may be light to me and vice versa." – Attitude [UK] 11/99

== Music video ==
A still from the video "Glory of the 80's"

The video for "Glory of the 80's" was directed by Erick Ifergan and shot in September 1999 in Los Angeles at Universal Studios and later aired on MTV Europe.

The video features Amos in Goth attire and make-up, trapped in a cubical torture chamber, with heavy cable bars fastened on her dress to the frame of the cage. Throughout the video, a shuriken is seen randomly but consistently flying around, slashing the cables, eventually freeing Amos from her prison. She is also seen sprouting black wings, and shape-shifting into various forms, including a raven.

"The Glory of the 80's video is coming out and this director said to me, he goes...he's French so I'll do his accent all wrong. But he goes, 'I have zis idea' and I said 'ok'...(interviewer interrupts to ask, 'would it be Steven Sinawi?')....nononono, Eric Ifergan. And he come and he goes, 'so I see you in a torture chamber...futuristic!'. And I'm like, 'ok'. He goes, 'no 80's reference *sound of disgust*'. And I said, 'yeah yeah ok' and he goes, 'so you're hooked, ya?' and I'm like that (Tori does a body movement to show how she's hanging in the video). 'Like a mother Joan of Arc, but, mmm, strange, like sexual, oui?'. And he's going on and on and he goes, 'and you will morph into these different creatures'. And I'm like, 'ok...Glory of the 80's.' So I'm in this torture chamber that is supposed to be quite fashionable, in his mind. And there you have it " - Musique Plus 10/13/99

== Track listings ==
Two versions of the single were issued containing different live tracks. UK copies of the second disc mistakenly contained the same music as the first, rather than the tracks listed on their packaging and labels.

UK CD single – Part 1

1. "Glory of the 80's" (4:01)
2. "Famous Blue Raincoat" (live) (5:24)
3. "Twinkle" (live) (2:48)

UK CD single – Part 2

1. "Glory of the 80's" (4:01)
2. "Baker Baker" (live) (3:53)
3. "Winter" (live) (7:01)

== Personnel ==
- Tori Amos – Bösendorfer piano, synthesizers, harpsichord, vocals
- Steve Caton – guitar
- Jon Evans – bass
- Matt Chamberlain – drums, percussion

== Charts ==
Chart (1999)	Peak position
Australia (ARIA)	81
Scotland Singles (OCC)	95
UK Singles (OCC)	46

== Release history ==
Region	Date	Format(s)	Label(s)	Ref.
Australia	October 11, 1999	CD	Atlantic	
United Kingdom	November 1, 1999	CD; cassette	Atlantic	
United States	January 11, 2000	Alternative radio	Atlantic	
