= Bliss (Tori Amos song) =

1999 single by Tori Amos

Single by Tori Amos

from the album To Venus and Back
- Released: August 13, 1999
- Studio: Martian Engineering (Cornwall)
- Length: 3:35
- Label: Atlantic
- Songwriter: Tori Amos
- Producer: Tori Amos

Tori Amos singles chronology
"Raspberry Swirl" (1998)	"Bliss" (1999)	"1000 Oceans" (1999)

"Bliss" is a song written, produced, and performed by American singer-songwriter and pianist Tori Amos. It is the lead track from Amos' fifth studio album, To Venus and Back. The song was first released as a digital download single on August 13, 1999, and was serviced to U.S. alternative rock radio four days later. It peaked at No. 91 on the U.S. Billboard Hot 100 and No. 7 on the Canadian Singles Chart.

== Meaning and interpretation ==
Sometimes, when you express thought to people, you leave it open for somebody to tromp in there and start tearing it down. I sing, Father I killed my monkey, to lead off the song, which explains that sometimes you even destroy your own so they can't excavate it. When I was growing up, I started becoming very secretive about my thoughts and the sensory world I would go to, because there's a lot of mind control that goes on constantly, people wanting access: 'What are you thinking?' So sometimes I'd have my own defense going, which would be to look them straight in the eye and make them think I've killed my imagination. But it's like, I'll take control.

== Release ==
In addition to the digital download, Atlantic Records released "Bliss" as a CD, cassette, 7-inch vinyl, and CD maxi single. The CD single contains the non-LP live version of "Hey Jupiter", while the maxi-CD also includes the non-LP version of "Upside Down". Both of the live tracks do not appear on the album To Venus and Back. The regular CD single cardboard packaging does not include the extra photo with the "Bliss" lyrics that was part of the CD maxi single.

== Music video ==
The "Bliss" video premiered on MTV 120 Minutes on August 15, 1999. The video uses footage that was filmed during the final two shows of the Plugged '98 tour in Michigan.

== Track listings ==
7-inch, CD, and cassette single

1. "Bliss" – 3:40
2. "Hey Jupiter" (live) – 4:31

CD maxi-single

1. "Bliss" – 3:40
2. "Hey Jupiter" (live) – 4:31
3. "Upside Down" (live) – 5:47

== Charts ==
Chart (1999)	Peak position
Canada (Nielsen SoundScan)	7
US Billboard Hot 100	91
US Hot Singles Sales (Billboard)	16

== Release history ==
Region	Date	Format(s)	Label(s)	Ref.
United States	August 13, 1999	Digital download	Atlantic	
United States	August 17, 1999	Alternative radio	Atlantic	
