= Ann Powers =

American writer and music critic (born 1964)

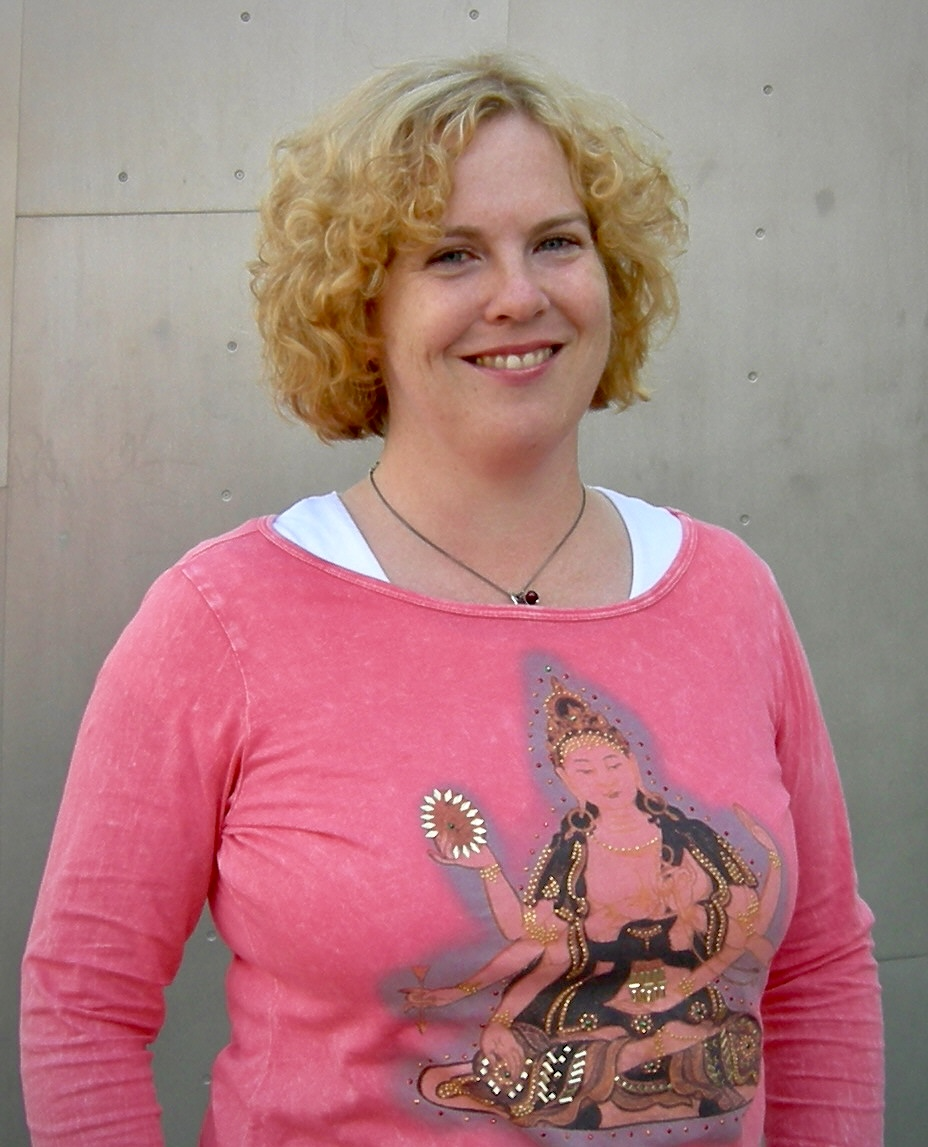
- Powers in 2007
- Born: Ann K. Powers; February 4, 1964 (age 62); Seattle, Washington, U.S.
- Education: San Francisco State University; University of California, Berkeley
- Occupation: Journalist
- Years active: 1980s–present
- Spouse: Eric Weisbard (m. 1998)
- Children: 1

Ann K. Powers (born February 4, 1964) is an American writer and popular music critic. She is a music critic for NPR and a contributor at the Los Angeles Times, where she was previously chief pop critic. She has also written for other publications, such as The New York Times, Blender and The Village Voice. Powers is the author of Traveling: On the Path of Joni Mitchell, a biography on the life of Joni Mitchell; Weird Like Us: My Bohemian America, a memoir; Good Booty: Love and Sex, Black & White, Body and Soul in American Music, on eroticism in American pop music; and Piece by Piece, co-authored with Tori Amos.

== Early life and education ==
Powers was born and raised in Seattle, Washington. During elementary school, her first poem was published in the Our Lady of Fatima school newspaper.

Powers earned a Bachelor of Arts degree in creative writing from San Francisco State University, and a Master of Arts degree in American literature from the University of California, Berkeley. Powers studied literary theory. She also wrote about music, feminism, film, and religion.

== Career ==
Powers' professional writing career began in 1980 while she was still in high school, when she started writing for the Seattle music weekly magazine The Rocket. After college, in 1986, Powers started writing about popular music and pop culture as a columnist at the San Francisco Weekly. After moving to New York City, she wrote for The New York Times from 1992 to 1993, then was an editor at The Village Voice from 1993 to 1996. From 1997 to 2001, Powers was the pop critic at The New York Times.

From 2001 until May 2005, Powers was senior curator at the Experience Music Project (EMP) in Seattle, which later became Museum of Pop Culture (MoPOP). Powers and her husband Eric Weisbard have helped organize the annual EMP Pop Conference (now MoPOP Conference) since its inception in 2002.

After a brief tenure as Blender magazine's senior critic, in March 2006, she accepted a position as chief pop critic at the Los Angeles Times, where she succeeded Robert Hilburn. Powers wrote regularly for Pop & Hiss, the Los Angeles Times' music blog, in addition to other features and news articles. She remained in this position until March 2011, when she departed for NPR, though she continued as a contributor for the Los Angeles Times afterward. Since 2011, Powers has been NPR Music's critic and correspondent. Powers has written for The Record, NPR's blog about finding, making, buying, sharing, and talking about music, since April 2011. In 2017, Powers spearheaded a multi-platform project at NPR called Turning the Tables. The project sought to reconstitute the canon of American popular music by publishing a list of the 150 greatest albums by women and a related series of essays, audio features, and events. Powers is also the Nashville correspondent for World Cafe, regularly recording sessions with local and regional Southern musicians.

Powers' work often critiques the perceptions of sex, racial, and social minorities in the music industry. She has written about topics such as religion, feminism, and film.

=== Books ===
Powers co-edited the 1995 anthology Rock She Wrote: Women Write About Rock, Pop, and Rap, and was the guest editor of the Da Capo Press Best Music Writing 2010.

In 2000, Powers published the memoir Weird Like Us: My Bohemian America. The book focuses on Powers' time living in Seattle, San Francisco, and Brooklyn. Joshua Klein of the A.V. Club described the project as "us[ing Powers'] personal experiences to define how youth culture (what she calls bohemianism) has changed over the years (though she lingers mostly on the '80s)."

In 2005, Powers co-wrote the book Piece by Piece with musician Tori Amos. The book discusses the role of women in the modern music industry and features information about composing, touring, performance, and the realities of the music business.

Powers wrote a proposal for a book on Kate Bush's album The Dreaming that was slated to be published in 2007 as part of the 33 1/3 series; however, the project was abandoned when Powers started her job at the Los Angeles Times, and the book was never written.

In August 2017, Powers published the book Good Booty: Love and Sex, Black & White, Body and Soul in American Music. The book reconsiders the history of American popular music through the lens of sexuality and eroticism. It was positively reviewed and was chosen as one of the best books of 2017 by The Wall Street Journal, NPR, No Depression, and BuzzFeed.

In 2024 she published a biography of singer-songwriter Joni Mitchell, titled, Traveling: On the Path of Joni Mitchell.

=== Other works ===
Powers has appeared in various TV shows and documentaries. She was in the film The Punk Singer as an interviewee discussing the influence of Kathleen Hanna on punk music. She also appeared in the documentaries The Gits and Undeniably Donnie in addition the Behind the Music Remastered episode on Heart.

== Personal life ==
Powers is married to Eric Weisbard, a music critic and professor of American studies at the University of Alabama. They were married in 1998. They moved to Tuscaloosa, Alabama, in 2009, later moving to East Nashville, Tennessee, in 2015. They have a daughter.

== Honors and awards ==
- 2008: Artist in Residence, The Popular Music Project at USC Annenberg Norman Lear Center
- 2010: ASCAP, Deems Taylor Award for "The Cultural Critic: Lady Gaga, It's Time for Idol to Open the Closet Door" and "My Night with Prince" for the Los Angeles Times

== Works and publications ==
=== Books ===
- McDonnell, Evelyn; Powers, Ann, eds. (1995). Rock She Wrote: Women Write About Rock, Pop, and Rap. London: Plexus. ISBN 978-0-859-65233-9. OCLC 35130945.
- Powers, Ann (2000). Weird Like Us: My Bohemian America. New York: Simon & Schuster. ISBN 978-0-684-83808-3. OCLC 42421011.
- Amos, Tori; Powers, Ann (2005). Tori Amos: Piece by Piece. A Portrait of the Artist: Her Thoughts, Her Conversations. New York: Broadway Books. ISBN 978-0-307-49204-3. OCLC 320322936.
- Powers, Ann, ed. (2010). Best Music Writing 2010. Cambridge, MA: Da Capo Press. ISBN 978-0-306-81925-4. OCLC 548569629.
- Powers, Ann (2017). Good Booty: Love and Sex, Black & White, Body and Soul in American Music. New York: Dey Street, William Morrow. ISBN 978-0-062-46369-2. OCLC 981576251.
- Powers, Ann (2024-03-12). Traveling: On the Path of Joni Mitchell. Dey Street Books. ISBN 978-0-06-246372-2.

=== Selected writing ===
- Powers, Ann (14 February 1993). "Pop Music; No Longer Rock's Playthings". The New York Times.
- Powers, Ann (29 June 1993). "Queer in the Streets, Straight in the Sheets: Notes on Passing". The Village Voice. 38 (26): 24, 30–31. ISSN 0042-6180. ProQuest 232206347.
- Powers, Ann (24 July 1997). "In Defense of Nasty Art: Forget the efforts by the Congress to ban the NEA--how the heck do the rest of us deal with the issue of critiquing nasty art?". Sonoma County Independent. MetroActive.
- Powers, Ann (2 August 1999). "Critic's Notebook; A Surge of Sexism On the Rock Scene". The New York Times.
- Powers, Ann (26 December 1999). "Music; In Rock's Canon, Anyone and Everyone". The New York Times.
- Powers, Ann (28 May 2002). "When a Rock Star Goes Political". The New York Times.
- Powers, Ann (23 December 2002). "The Power of Music: Talking With Eddie Vedder, Boots Riley, Amy Ray, Carrie Brownstein, Tom Morello". The Nation. ISBN 9780815410188. ISSN 0027-8378. OCLC 95683549.
- Powers, Ann (5 July 2005). "Never More. The death of a hometown antihero: Ann Powers reports from Seattle on the suicide of Kurt Cobain". The Village Voice. Archived from the original on December 31, 2017.
- Powers, Ann (9 May 2006). "Latinos give new life to Neil Diamond anthem". Los Angeles Times. – Da Capo Best Music Writing 2007
- Powers, Ann (2008). "A Spy in the House of Love". Women and Music: A Journal of Gender and Culture. 12 (1): 40–43. doi:10.1353/wam.0.0013. ISSN 1090-7505. OCLC 364801562. S2CID 194077911.
- Powers, Ann (20 February 2008). "'Idol' Banter: Meet the Boys". Los Angeles Times. Archived from the original on 7 January 2018. – Da Capo Best Music Writing 2009
- Powers, Ann (11 January 2009). "Where music meets religion: What an L.A. Times writer learned spending a night with Prince in 2009". Los Angeles Times.
- Powers, Ann (10 March 2009). "YOU BETTER THINK: Why Feminist Cultural Criticism Still Matters in a "Post-Feminist," Peer-to-Peer World" (PDF). The Popular Music Project. USC Annenberg Norman Lear Center.
- Powers, Ann (13 December 2009). "Frank talk with Lady Gaga: The pop sensation's bold stances on feminism, sexuality, fame and so much more have helped elevate her music to its own art form". Los Angeles Times.
- Powers, Ann (5 December 2013). "Lorde Sounds Like Teen Spirit". NPR.
- Powers, Ann (2014). "If the Girls Were All Transported". In Wilson, Carl (ed.). Let's Talk About Love: Why Other People Have Such Bad Taste. New York: Bloomsbury Academic. pp. 183–188. ISBN 978-1-4411-6677-7.
- Powers, Ann (8 May 2014). "Is It Worth It To Work It?". NPR.
- Powers, Ann (2017). "Houses of the Holy". In Lethem, Jonathan; Dettmar, Kevin J. H. (eds.). Shake It Up: Great American Writing On Rock And Pop From Elvis To Jay Z. New York: Library of America. ISBN 978-1-598-53531-0. OCLC 959032031. – on PJ Harvey's album Rid of Me

== See also ==
- Album era
