= 1000 Oceans =

1999 single by Tori Amos

Single by Tori Amos

from the album To Venus and Back
- B-side: "Baker Baker" (live); "Winter" (live)
- Released: August 30, 1999
- Studio: Martian Engineering (Cornwall)
- Length: 4:18
- Label: Atlantic
- Songwriter: Tori Amos
- Producer: Tori Amos

Tori Amos singles chronology
"Bliss" (1999)	"1000 Oceans" (1999)	"Glory of the 80's" (1999)

"1000 Oceans" is a song by American singer-songwriter and pianist Tori Amos, released as the second single from her fifth studio album, To Venus and Back. The song was released to U.S. adult contemporary radio formats on August 30, 1999, two weeks after the previous single, "Bliss", was sent to alternative formats. "1000 Oceans" reached No. 22 on the US Billboard Hot Singles Sales chart. The song deals with issues of love and loss and is based on Amos's personal experiences.

== Background ==
Tori Amos explained that the idea for the song came to her in a dream. An old African woman was humming the melody to her, and she got up around 5:30 in the morning to record it. She describes writing the transition from the melody line around the words "I can't believe that I would keep, keep you from flying" to "and I would cry 1000 more" as particularly difficult, and what took the longest time. The inspiration for the lyrics came when her father-in-law died, and she claims the song helped her husband deal with the grieving process. The lyrics contain reference to Silbury Hill, an ancient mound in Wiltshire, England. This is a place often visited by Amos and her husband.

== Music video ==
The video for the song was directed by Erick Ifergan and filmed by Toby Irwin, and it was shot in a downtown Los Angeles parking lot. It shows Amos singing inside a glass booth. The booth is in a busy street, and as people walk by some stop and stare. Others are engaged in everyday activities, and at one point a full-scale riot breaks out in the street, while Amos behaves like a mere distant observer. The video had its TV debut on MTV's 120 Minutes on October 24, 1999.

== Reviews ==
Reviewers generally had a positive attitude towards "1000 Oceans", and many mentioned it among the better tracks on the album. VH1 said the song was "one of the most billowing songs she's written in a while". The Tech called the melody of this song and "Lust" "powerful ballads" and "some of Tori's finest". Others were less impressed though; Spin magazine called the album track "perhaps the most disappointing", and claimed Amos came across as a "Celine Dion-LeAnn Rimes rip-off".

== Track listings ==
US CD and cassette single

1. "1000 Oceans" – 4:18
2. "Baker Baker" (live) – 4:18

US 7-inch single

1. "1000 Oceans" – 4:17
2. "Baker Baker" (live non LP version) – 3:56

US maxi-CD single

1. "1000 Oceans" (album version) – 4:18
2. "Baker Baker" (live non LP version) – 3:53
3. "Winter" (live non LP version) – 7:01
4. "1000 Oceans" (video)
5. "Bliss" (video)

Australian CD single

1. "1000 Oceans" (album version) – 4:18
2. "Baker Baker" (live non LP version) – 3:53
3. "Winter" (live non LP version) – 7:01

== Charts ==
Chart (1999–2000)	Peak position
Australia (ARIA)	145
Canada Adult Contemporary (RPM)	50
US Hot Singles Sales (Billboard)	22

== Release history ==
Region	Date	Format(s)	Label(s)	Ref.
United States	August 30, 1999	Adult contemporary; hot adult contemporary radio	Atlantic	
Australia	January 10, 2000	CD	Atlantic	
