= Dātura (song) =

Song by Tori Amos

from the album To Venus and Back
- Recorded: 1999
- Studio: Martian Engineering (Cornwall)
- Genre: Alternative rock
- Length: 8:25
- Label: Atlantic (US); East West (Europe)
- Songwriter: Tori Amos
- Producer: Tori Amos

"Dātura" is a song by American singer-songwriter and pianist Tori Amos, released on her fifth studio album To Venus and Back (1999). At eight minutes and twenty-five seconds in length, it is the longest song in the studio portion of the album.

== Background ==
The song takes its name from the Datura, a hallucinogenic plant with the potential to be lethally toxic. The lyrics of the first section mainly consist of a list of plants found in Amos' garden. Also included in this section are cut-up and manipulated vocals from Amos in the background, and the repeatedly occurring phrase "get out of the garden". This is then followed by a bridge section which switches to common time. In the second half of the song, the lyric "dividing Canaan" appears prominently. The song's intricate arrangement includes shifting time signatures (6/8, 7/8, 8/8, and 9/8), simultaneous drum tracks, and drum pads being fed through guitar amps and pedals. Due to the complexity of the song, it has never been performed live in full, although excerpts from it have been interspersed with other songs in concert, such as with "Take to the Sky".

"Dātura" was created partially through improvisation with drummer Matt Chamberlain at her studio, Martian Engineering in Cornwall, England. The plants appearing in the lyrics come from a list given to Amos by her gardener, containing all the remaining plants from her garden that had not yet died. The inclusion of "Dātura" on To Venus and Back caused another lengthy track, "Zero Point", to be cut from the album. "Zero Point" later appeared on the 2006 boxset A Piano: The Collection.

== Personnel ==
- Tori Amos - vocals, piano, synths, production
- Matt Chamberlain - drums, percussion
- Jon Evans - bass
- Steve Caton - guitars
- Andy Gray - additional programming and additional drum programming

Additional personnel:

- Jon Astley - mastering
- Mark Hawley - recording and mixing
- Marcel van Limbeek - recording and mixing
- Rob van Tuin - assistant recording and mixing
