= The Beekeeper (album) =

Studio album by Tori Amos
- Released: February 20, 2005
- Recorded: June–November 2004
- Studios: Martian Engineering (Cornwall, England)
- Genre: Alternative rock
- Length: 79:31
- Label: Epic
- Producer: Tori Amos

Tori Amos chronology
Tales of a Librarian (2004)	The Beekeeper (2005)	A Piano: The Collection (2006)

Singles from The Beekeeper
- 1. "Sleeps with Butterflies" Released: January 10, 2005; 2. "Sweet the Sting" Released: 2005

The Beekeeper is the eighth studio album by American singer-songwriter and pianist Tori Amos. It was released on February 20, 2005, through Epic Records and is her second release for the label. As with many of Amos's releases throughout the 2000s, The Beekeeper is a concept album, heavily inspired by the practice of beekeeping and its connection to femininity and female empowerment. The album's nineteen tracks are separated into six different "gardens" (denoted in the booklet of the limited edition of the album), and are inspired by topics such as her experiences with motherhood ("Ribbons Undone"), betrayal ("Witness"), and Christian mythology ("Marys of the Sea").

The Beekeeper continues the stripped-back approach of Amos's previous album Scarlet's Walk (2002), now with strong elements of soul music, augmented by guest vocals from the London Community Gospel Choir and Amos's use of the Hammond B-3 organ. Supporting musicians on the album include frequent collaborators Matt Chamberlain on drums, Jon Evans on bass, and Mac Aladdin on guitar. Live performance was emphasized during the recording sessions, rather than having musicians record their parts separately using overdubs.

The album was a success upon its release, reaching the top five in the US and receiving generally positive reviews from critics, although some criticism was directed at its length and production. "Sleeps with Butterflies" and "Sweet the Sting" were released as singles to promote the album, with the former reaching number four on the Billboard Adult Alternative Airplay chart (her second-highest position on the chart to date). The album was supported by the Original Sinsuality and Summer of Sin tours, which ran from May through July and August through September of that year, respectively. Similar to Scarlet's Walk, a double-disc limited edition of The Beekeeper was released, containing a bonus DVD with the extra track "Garlands" and a mini-documentary about the album's songs and a "Beekeeper Mix" packet of wildflower seeds.

== Background ==
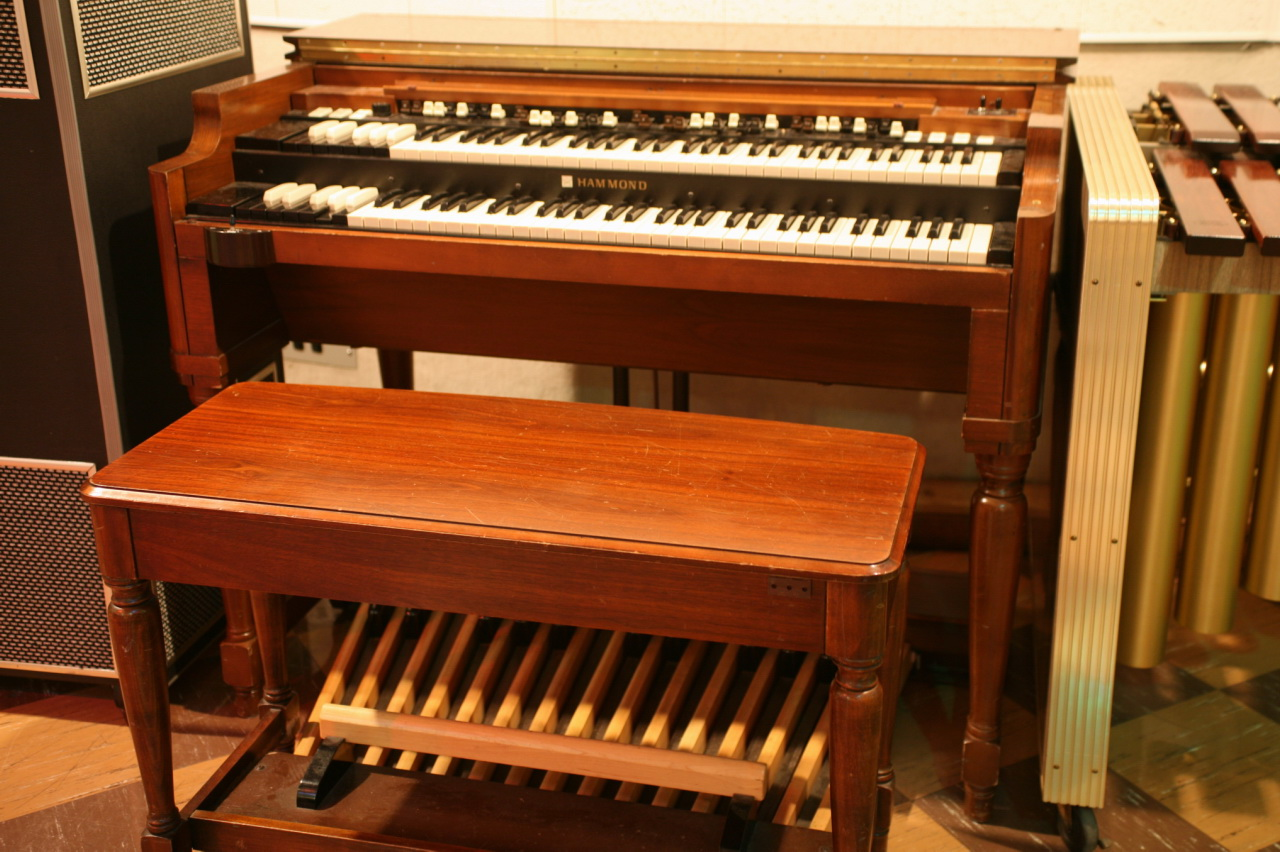
The Beekeeper features prominent use of the Hammond B-3 organ.

After the release of the covers album Strange Little Girls in 2001, Amos left Atlantic Records for Epic to release Scarlet's Walk. A primary motivation for the label switch was the company's president Polly Anthony. Amos felt Anthony would commit to promoting her work properly, something she felt Atlantic had not done with her recent releases. However, with Anthony's resignation in 2003 and Epic's merger with BMG Entertainment, she ended up in a similarly frustrating position.

Like many of Amos's releases throughout the 2000s, The Beekeeper is a concept album. Alongside the inspiration from beekeeping, female spirituality and the experiences of women in Christianity play a large role, particularly in songs such as "Original Sinsuality" and "Marys of the Sea". Songs from the album are separated into six different "gardens", detailed in the limited edition booklet: "roses and thorns", "herbs and elixirs", "the greenhouse", "the desert garden", "the orchard", and "the rock garden".

During the writing of the album, Amos was concurrently writing her first book, Piece by Piece with journalist Ann Powers, which goes into detail about the background of many tracks appearing on The Beekeeper along with other songs from her discography.

== Recording ==
The Beekeeper was recorded throughout 2004 at Martian Engineering Studios in Cornwall, England, with the mixing handled by Amos's husband Mark Hawley and Marcel van Limbeek. The album was self-produced. In addition to Chamberlain, Evans, and Aladdin, the London Community Gospel Choir appears on the tracks "Sweet the Sting", "Mother Revolution", "Witness", and "Hoochie Woman".

Special emphasis was put on recording the tracks live in lieu of recording various parts separately and using overdubs. In some instances, multiple keyboard instruments would be recorded within the same take; the piano stool was positioned in between Amos's piano and Hammond organ, allowing her to switch between the two without the need for separate takes.

== Music and lyrics ==
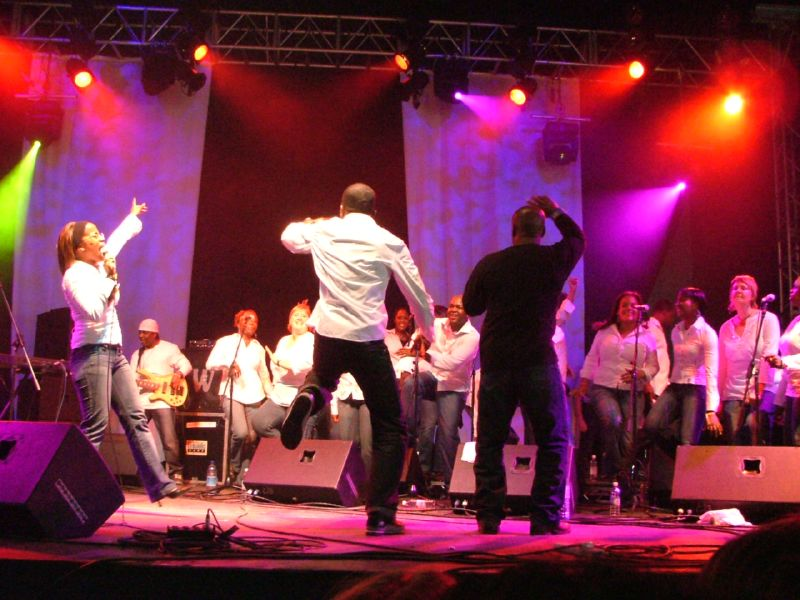
The London Community Gospel Choir are featured prominently on tracks such as "Sweet the Sting" and "Witness".

The opening track, "Parasol", takes inspiration from Georges Seurat's Seated Woman with a Parasol (Study for "La Grande Jatte"). The song depicts a woman who is exiting a relationship with a controlling partner. She now has to confront herself and her experience to be able to recover from said relationship. "Sweet the Sting" is a primary example of the album's soul influence, enhanced by the prominent vocals of the London Community Gospel Choir and Amos's Hammond B-3 organ. Stevie Wonder's "Pastime Paradise" was a significant influence on the track. "The Power of Orange Knickers" features vocals from Irish singer-songwriter Damien Rice. The track was written as a response to frequent use of the word "terrorist" (particularly after the September 11 attacks) and to those who twist the term for their own personal or political gain. Amos wrote the lyrics with the intention of "undressing" the word and finding a more basic and universal definition for it.

"Jamaica Inn" features mandolin playing by Mac Aladdin. The song took inspiration from the Daphne du Maurier novel of the same name, and stories from Cornwall locals of ships running aground and being looted by wreckers. "Barons of Suburbia" features extensive use of mixed meter, alternating between 6/8, 7/8, and 9/8. The song reportedly took months to write, with the pre-chorus taking shape much earlier than the rest of the track. "Sleeps with Butterflies" continues the theme of nature and pollination-themed imagery. Much like portions of the previous track, its chorus took months for Amos to complete, eventually coming as a spur-of-the-moment creation on the piano. "General Joy" was written in July 2004 and criticizes the war on terror. "Mother Revolution" concerns the concept of mothers suffering the deaths of their children in global conflict. As Amos said in a 2005 interview with Uncut: "what I find really disturbing about this global war, is you don't see any of the world leaders sending their children to be butchered. It's always someone else's children, someone else's blood." "Ribbons Undone" was inspired by Amos's daughter Natashya. "Cars and Guitars" features prominent upright bass playing by Evans and was inspired by the concept of a woman reaching an emotional breaking point and driving away to abandon her family.

This album is exploring relationships. In the garden of "Original Sinsuality," because Sophia has insisted that my character eat from the fruit of the tree of knowledge - as opposed to the god in Genesis that it exiles you if you eat from it -- in our garden, the character has to eat. Because she eats from it, she experiences all the different possibilities within relationships.

— Tori Amos

"Witness", a song described as being about betrayal, also heavily features elements of soul music. "Original Sinsuality" is a solo piano-and-vocal performance. The song gave its name to the album's supporting tour and was used as the opening song in each of its shows. Amos stated the song "suggests it's not sin you find in the garden, it's original sinsuality", a term created to represent a situation in which her character is encouraged to eat from the tree of the knowledge of good and evil, rather than being dissuaded from it. "Ireland" exerts a reggae influence and was inspired by writer James Joyce. The album's title track was originally written after Amos's mother had suffered a medical emergency, and later took on new meaning after the passing of Amos's brother in a car accident: "I was drawn to the idea that in a bee colony, the drones are the ones that go first. I thought that it was nature's parallel for the loss of this man before his time." "Martha's Foolish Ginger" is a track which Amos has said to have worked on over a period of several years, having created its title and written its chorus while struggling to finish the song until being inspired by a trip to San Francisco during her 2003 Lottapianos tour.

"Hoochie Woman" continues the soul-influenced theme of prior tracks combined with various percussive elements. Inspired in part by a book entitled Sextrology, "Goodbye Pisces" portrays the end of a relationship with lyrics influenced by astrological signs and ages. "Marys of the Sea" was heavily inspired by a translation of The Gospel of Mary Magdalene with commentary from Jean-Yves Leloup. Amos wrote the song with the intention of including multiple different sides to the story of Mary Magdalene; both as her being part of the sacred marriage, but also tackling the sexist attitudes towards women held by Saint Peter, Paul the Apostle, and many hailing from early Orthodox Christian tradition. The piano riff for the song's verse was written prior to the section's melody or lyrics; Amos said that while writing the song, she came up with "about seventeen [melodies] that I sing in the shower" before finding the right one to use. Amos also cited the tale of Melusine, a figure in European folklore described as having the upper-half of a woman and lower-half of a fish or serpent (similar to a mermaid), as an inspiration for the song. The album's closer, "Toast", was written in dedication to Amos's late brother. "Garlands" (originally entitled "Washington Square") is a bonus track only available on the limited edition DVD.

== Promotion and release ==
Photography for the packaging of The Beekeeper was done by Kevin Mackintosh, with art direction handled by Sheri Lee and Dave Bett. It became the first of Amos's albums to not have any commercial physical single releases. Rather, "Sleeps with Butterflies" and "Sweet the Sting" were released to radio stations on promotional CDs and were available to stream online for the public. "Sleeps with Butterflies" peaked at number four on the US Triple A chart, her second-highest peak on the chart behind the previous album's "A Sorta Fairytale", which peaked at number two. Amos promoted the track with various television appearances, including on the Late Show with David Letterman and Weekend Today.

The Beekeeper was released in various territories through February 20–22, 2005. It reached a peak position of number five in the US, becoming her fifth top ten album. As with Scarlet's Walk, a limited edition double-disc version of The Beekeeper was released, containing a DVD with the bonus track "Garlands" and a mini-documentary on the album entitled The Beekeeper: A Walk Through the Gardens and a "Beekeeper Mix" packet of wildflower seeds.

"Sweet the Sting" and "The Beekeeper" later appeared on the 2006 boxset A Piano: The Collection.

== Critical reception ==
Professional ratings
Aggregate scores
Source	Rating
Metacritic	65/100
Review scores
Source	Rating
AllMusic	3.5/5 stars
Entertainment Weekly	B
The Guardian	4/5 stars
Los Angeles Times	3.5/4 stars
Mojo	4/5 stars
Playlouder	4/5 stars
PopMatters	6/10
Rolling Stone	3/5 stars
Spin	5/10
Uncut	4/5 stars

The Beekeeper received mixed-to-positive reviews from critics. While much of the material was praised, many critics felt the album was overproduced and overly long. Barry Walters of Rolling Stone praised the album's second half, highlighting the "harrowing starkness" of "Original Sinsuality" and the title track's electronic elements, but found its length "frustrating" and stated that "with some ruthless editing and remixing, this maddeningly uneven eighty-minute disc could have been her best in ages." PopMatters rated the album 6 out of 10, naming "Toast", "Parasol", "General Joy", and "Original Sinsuality" (the latter in particular) as highlights, yet derided "Sleeps with Butterflies", "Hoochie Woman", and "Ireland" and stated that the album's production and arrangements led to it sounding like "a collection of outtakes from a much better album."

Keith Phipps of the A.V. Club was critical of much of the album. While he did praise "Parasol", he felt most of the album "floats by without stirring much interest". In a retrospective review for AllMusic, Stephen Thomas Erlewine awarded the album 3.5 stars out of 5. He praised the album's sense of cohesion, stating it "flow[s] with the grace and purpose of a song suite", and calling it "an ambitious, restless work that builds on her past work without resting on her laurels."

=== Aftermath ===
Amos has gone on to express disappointment about the album's stripped-back arrangements. She described the album's sound as "no make-up, no airbrush, no nothing", going on to refer to it as "not one of my favourite records because of that." Subsequently, Amos would apply a band-centric ethos to American Doll Posse (2007) and a heavy emphasis on arrangements for Abnormally Attracted to Sin (2009) in contrast with the approach of The Beekeeper.

== Tour ==
Two tours were held in promotion of The Beekeeper: the Original Sinsuality Tour, which ran through the spring and early summer of 2005, and the Summer of Sin Tour, which occurred in August and September that same year. Each show featured songs from The Beekeeper alongside tracks from Amos's previous albums, with a "Tori's Piano Bar" segment in the middle of the main set consisting of a couple covers of songs by a wide range of artists. Aside from "Original Sinsuality"'s permanent spot as the show-opener, each show contained a unique setlist as is typical of Amos's shows. Amos was joined by the London Community Gospel Choir during the June 4 show, appearing on "Mother Revolution", "Witness", "Sweet the Sting", and "Hoochie Woman". The shows, particularly those from the Summer of Sin Tour, were positively received.

Select shows from the tours were released as a series of six live albums entitled The Original Bootlegs. The first five shows came from the Original Sinsuality Tour whilst the final volume came from an August show from the Summer of Sin Tour. Saratogian.com praised the August 23 performance at Saratoga Performing Arts Center, calling it "magical" and praising her lively stage presence and setlist choices. The Salt Lake Tribune called the September 6 concert at the USANA Amphitheatre "smoldering" and gave particular praise to the performance of "Winter".

== Track listing ==
All tracks are written by Tori Amos.

The Beekeeper
No.	Title	Garden	Length
1.	"Parasol"	The Greenhouse	3:54
2.	"Sweet the Sting"	Elixirs and Herbs	4:16
3.	"The Power of Orange Knickers" (featuring Damien Rice)	The Greenhouse	3:36
4.	"Jamaica Inn"	Roses and Thorns	4:03
5.	"Barons of Suburbia"	Desert Garden	5:21
6.	"Sleeps with Butterflies"	Roses and Thorns	3:35
7.	"General Joy"	Desert Garden	4:13
8.	"Mother Revolution"	The Orchard	3:58
9.	"Ribbons Undone"	The Orchard	4:30
10.	"Cars and Guitars"	Rock Garden	3:45
11.	"Witness"	Rock Garden	6:06
12.	"Original Sinsuality"	The Orchard	2:02
13.	"Ireland"	The Greenhouse	3:49
14.	"The Beekeeper"	Desert Garden	6:50
15.	"Martha's Foolish Ginger"	Elixirs and Herbs	4:22
16.	"Hoochie Woman"	Rock Garden	2:34
17.	"Goodbye Pisces"	The Greenhouse	3:36
18.	"Marys of the Sea"	Roses and Thorns	5:11
19.	"Toast"	Elixirs and Herbs	3:42
Total length:			79:31

Note: An additional track, "Garlands" (placed in "the orchard") appears on the DVD included in the limited edition of the album.

== Personnel ==
- Tori Amos – Bösendorfer piano, Hammond B-3 organ (1, 2, 5, 7, 11, 14), vocals, handclaps (16)
- Mac Aladdin – acoustic and electric guitars, mandolin (4), twelve-string guitar (17)
- Jon Evans – bass guitar, upright bass (4, 10), Hammond bass pedals (14), handclaps (16)
- Matt Chamberlain – drums, handclaps (16)
- Damien Rice – additional vocals (3)
- London Community Gospel Choir – backing vocals (2, 8, 11, 16)
- Kelsey Dobyns – additional backing vocals (9)
- Alison Evans – handclaps (16)
- Chelsea Laird – handclaps (16)

== Charts ==
Chart performance for The Beekeeper
Chart (2005)	Peak position
Australian Albums (ARIA)	20
Austrian Albums (Ö3 Austria)	8
Belgian Albums (Ultratop Flanders)	11
Belgian Albums (Ultratop Wallonia)	37
Danish Albums (Hitlisten)	21
Dutch Albums (Album Top 100)	13
Finnish Albums (Suomen virallinen lista)	15
French Albums (SNEP)	44
German Albums (Offizielle Top 100)	8
Irish Albums (IRMA)	27
Norwegian Albums (VG-lista)	27
Polish Albums (ZPAV)	8
Scottish Albums (Official Charts)	28
Swedish Albums (Sverigetopplistan)	26
Swiss Albums (Schweizer Hitparade)	13
UK Albums (Official Charts)	24
US Billboard 200	5

== Certifications ==
Region	Certification	Certified units/sales
United States	—	295,000

== See also ==
- The Original Bootlegs
