= To Venus and Back =

1999 double album by Tori Amos

Studio album / Live album by Tori Amos
- Released: September 21, 1999
- Recorded: 1998–1999
- Venue: various venues during her Plugged '98 tour
- Studios: Martian Engineering, Cornwall, England
- Genres: Alternative rock; trip hop; electronica; art pop
- Length: 123:22; 47:50 (studio); 75:32 (live)
- Labels: Atlantic (US); East West (Europe)
- Producer: Tori Amos

Tori Amos chronology
From the Choirgirl Hotel (1998)	To Venus and Back (1999)	Strange Little Girls (2001)

Singles from To Venus and Back
- 1. "Bliss" Released: August 24, 1999; 2. "1000 Oceans" Released: September 9, 1999; 3. "Glory of the 80's" Released: October 11, 1999; 4. "Concertina" Released: February 8, 2000

To Venus and Back is a double album by American singer-songwriter and pianist Tori Amos. Released on September 21, 1999, it comprises her fifth studio album and first live album. The first disc, entitled Venus: Orbiting, shows Amos increasingly experimenting with elements of electronica and trip hop, and spawned the singles "Bliss" (which peaked at number 91 on the Billboard Hot 100), "1000 Oceans", "Glory of the 80's", and "Concertina". The second disc, Venus Live, Still Orbiting, was recorded mostly during her Plugged '98 tour in support of her previous album, From the Choirgirl Hotel.

== Background ==
To Venus and Back was originally envisioned as a live album accompanied by an album of B-sides from previous singles, with a few new tracks added. However, it was later decided that the B-sides and new material would not mix well as one cohesive album, so the idea was dropped and this portion was later expanded into a full album of new material. These songs, like many of her albums, were recorded at Amos' Martian Engineering in Cornwall, England, and features the lineup of Steve Caton on guitar, Jon Evans on bass, and Matt Chamberlain on drums. This marks the first of many of Amos' albums to feature Evans and Chamberlain, and the last of which to include Caton.

The album is sparser both in production and arrangement than From the Choirgirl Hotel, but is similar to its predecessor in that it features overt electronica influences and a relatively subdued piano sound. The songs find Amos's voice and piano subverted in a sonic maze of electronic washes and effects, and some tracks, notably "Juárez" and the epic "Dātura" are largely built around these effects.

"Bliss", the first single from the album, became Amos' last song to reach the Billboard Hot 100, peaking at number 91. The track also reached number seven on the Canadian Singles Chart, her highest peak up to that point and second-highest overall (after "A Sorta Fairytale" which peaked one place higher). Describing the song in an interview with Mojo, she stated:

["Bliss" is] not just about the biological father, but also the authority figure, whoever it is that I put in that position. "Bliss" is really about control, and about certain things in our DNA that you can't use a strainer to get rid of. You can't separate completely from whoever made you, because they're a part of you.

Other topics covered on the album include unsolved murdered female maquiladora workers in Ciudad Juárez on the US–Mexico border ("Juárez"), hallucinogenic plants ("Dātura"), and Napoleon Bonaparte ("Josephine").

The renditions of "Sugar" and "Purple People" on Venus Live, Still Orbiting come from a soundcheck. Both tracks were originally released as B-sides, the former on the "China" single, and the latter on the single for "Spark". The sole track recorded during the To Venus and Back recording sessions that does not appear on the album, nor as a B-side, is the nine-minute "Zero Point". Of the song's exclusion from the album, Amos has said that the song was not intentionally left off the album, rather an over-sensitivity about a certain gardening issue led "Dātura" to being included instead. The liner notes of To Venus and Back state, "'Zero Point' – your time is coming", and the song was eventually released seven years later on A Piano: The Collection (2006).

== Tour ==
The album was supported by a short tour in 1999, the Five and a Half Weeks Tour, which Amos co-headlined with Alanis Morissette beginning a month prior to the release of To Venus and Back. Many referred to Amos as the "opening act" for Morissette because she always performed first; however, this was due only to the logistics of setting up a grand piano for performance. An Amos-only stint, the To Dallas and Back Tour, also took place, but promotional plans were cut when Amos suffered her third miscarriage in November 1999.

== Critical reception ==
Professional ratings
Review scores
Source	Rating
AllMusic	4/5 stars
The A.V. Club	(favourable)
Entertainment Weekly	B
NME	(mixed)
Nude as the News	(favourable)
PopMatters	(6/10)
Q	11/1999 (p.116)
Rolling Stone	4/5 stars

The studio disc of To Venus and Back is recognized as one of Amos's most experimental yet melodic, and received generally positive reviews. Some critics praised its originality, innovation and unpredictable song structures, with one reviewer describing the album as having "some of the best vocals of her career, embedded in modern, special-effects-laden soundscapes that move from electronica-spiced piano pop and hip-hop to ambient space music", while some begrudged the album because of its overuse of electronic instruments and lack of Amos's trademark simple sound, most present on albums such as Little Earthquakes (1992) and Under the Pink (1994).

The album received two 2000 Grammy Award nominations: Best Female Rock Vocal Performance for "Bliss" and Best Alternative Music Album.

== Commercial performance ==
To Venus and Back, priced higher than Amos's previous releases because of its two-disc format, sold 112,000 copies in the US in its first week and debuted at number 12 on the Billboard 200, number 18 on the Top Canadian Albums, and number 22 on the UK Albums Chart, breaking her run of three consecutive UK Top 10 albums.

Two months after its release in November 1999, the album achieved RIAA Certification, reaching Gold and Platinum sales status simultaneously, due to the release being a double CD set. To Venus and Back remained on the Billboard 200 for 11 weeks, with its final position at number 189 for the week of January 8, 2000, before falling off the chart. As of May 2008, the album has sold 458,000 copies in the US, according to Nielsen SoundScan.

== Track listing ==
All tracks are written by Tori Amos.

Disc one – Venus: Orbiting
No.	Title	Length
1.	"Bliss"	3:42
2.	"Juárez"	3:48
3.	"Concertina"	3:56
4.	"Glory of the 80's"	4:03
5.	"Lust"	3:54
6.	"Suede"	4:58
7.	"Josephine"	2:30
8.	"Riot Poof"	3:28
9.	"Dātura"	8:25
10.	"Spring Haze"	4:44
11.	"1000 Oceans"	4:19
Total length:		47:50

Disc two – Venus Live, Still Orbiting
No.	Title	From	Length
1.	"Precious Things"	Little Earthquakes (1992)	7:37
2.	"Cruel"	From the Choirgirl Hotel (1998)	6:47
3.	"Cornflake Girl"	Under the Pink (1994)	6:31
4.	"Bells for Her"	Under the Pink	5:42
5.	"Girl"	Little Earthquakes	4:15
6.	"Cooling"	B-side to "Spark" (1998)	5:09
7.	"Mr. Zebra"	Boys for Pele (1996)	1:17
8.	"Cloud on My Tongue"	Under the Pink	4:58
9.	"Sugar"	B-side to "China" (1992)	5:10
10.	"Little Earthquakes"	Little Earthquakes	7:37
11.	"Space Dog"	Under the Pink	5:46
12.	"The Waitress"	Under the Pink	10:24
13.	"Purple People"	B-side to "Spark"	4:11
Total length:			75:32 123:22

=== B-sides ===
Given the conditions under which the album was created, To Venus and Back is unique in that it does not have any studio tracks that serve as B-sides. Instead the album's singles are backed by live tracks recorded from the previous year's tour.

Title	Length	Single
"Hey Jupiter" (live)	4:32	"Bliss" (1999)
"Upside Down" (live)	5:47	"Bliss" (1999)
"Baker, Baker" (live)	3:54	"1000 Oceans" (1999)
"Winter" (live)	6:59	"1000 Oceans" (1999)
"Famous Blue Raincoat" (live)	5:25	"Glory of the 80's" (UK) (1999) / "Concertina" (US) (2000)
"Twinkle" (live)	2:48	"Glory of the 80's" (UK) (1999) / "Concertina" (US) (2000)

Following the theme of the album's second disc, which is composed of live tracks arranged similarly to an actual concert, the B-sides that appear on the album's singles are live songs performed solo with Amos on the piano. The chart above lists only the songs that were released as B-sides on singles from To Venus and Back.

== Personnel ==
- Tori Amos - Bösendorfer piano, synthesizers, harpsichord (disc 1 — track 4), vocals
- Steve Caton – guitar
- Jon Evans – bass
- Matt Chamberlain – drums, percussion
- Andy Gray – additional drum programming on (disc 1 — tracks 6, 8, 9)

== Charts ==
=== Albums ===
Chart (1999)	Peak position
Australian Albums (ARIA)	6
Austrian Albums (Ö3 Austria)	17
Belgian Albums (Ultratop Flanders)	13
Canadian Albums (Billboard)	18
Dutch Albums (Album Top 100)	24
European Albums (Eurotipsheet)	22
Finnish Albums (Suomen virallinen lista)	30
French Albums (SNEP)	31
German Albums (Offizielle Top 100)	11
Norwegian Albums (VG-lista)	10
Scottish Albums (Official Charts)	37
Swedish Albums (Sverigetopplistan)	49
Swiss Albums (Schweizer Hitparade)	27
UK Albums (Official Charts)	22
US Billboard 200	12

=== Singles ===
Title	Chart	Position
"Bliss" (1999)	Canadian Singles Chart	7
"Bliss" (1999)	US Billboard Hot 100 Singles Sales	16
"Bliss" (1999)	US Billboard Hot 100 Airplay	89?
"Bliss" (1999)	US Billboard Hot 100	91
"1000 Oceans" (1999)	US Billboard Hot 100 Singles Sales	22
"Glory of the 80's" (1999)	UK Singles Chart	46
"Glory of the 80's" (1999)	Australian Singles Chart	81
"Concertina" (2000)	US AAA	18
"Concertina" (2000)	US Billboard Hot 100 Singles Sales	48

== Certifications ==
Region	Certification	Certified units/sales
United States (RIAA)	Platinum	1,000,000^{^}
^{^} Shipments figures based on certification alone.
