= Tulip Hysteria Co-ordinating =

Fictitious work by Marcel Duchamp

Marcel Duchamp, 1913

Tulip Hysteria Co-ordinating (also referred to as Tulip Hysteria Coordinating) is a fictitious work of art by Marcel Duchamp.

During early 1917, rumor spread that Duchamp was working on a Cubist painting titled Tulip Hysteria Co-ordinating, in preparation for the largest exhibition of modern art ever to take place in the United States; the "First Annual Exhibition" of the Society of Independent Artists, due to open 10 April at the Grand Central Palace in New York City. With over 1,200 artists presenting 2,000 works, the exhibition was twice the size of the 1913 Armory Show. It was modeled after the Salon des Indépendants in Paris, open to all, with no jury and no prize, with a six-dollar membership–entry fee. Duchamp had been appointed head of the hanging committee.

When Tulip Hysteria Co-ordinating did not appear at the show, those who had expected to see it were despondent. Instead of submitting the painting Duchamp resigned as a director following the Society's refusal to exhibit Fountain—a readymade in the form of a urinal and signed with the pseudonym "R. Mutt." The incident pointed out that the exhibition was not truly open to anyone, and in retaliation Duchamp withdrew Tulip Hysteria Co-ordinating, or never presented it.

No painting with the title Tulip Hysteria Co-ordinating has ever appeared, and no further mention or documentation relating to it has ever been found. Duchamp is not listed as having contributed any works at all to the exhibition.

The work actually submitted by Duchamp, but not exhibited, Fountain (signed R. Mutt), is regarded by art historians and theorists of the avant-garde as a major landmark in 20th-century art.

== Origin ==
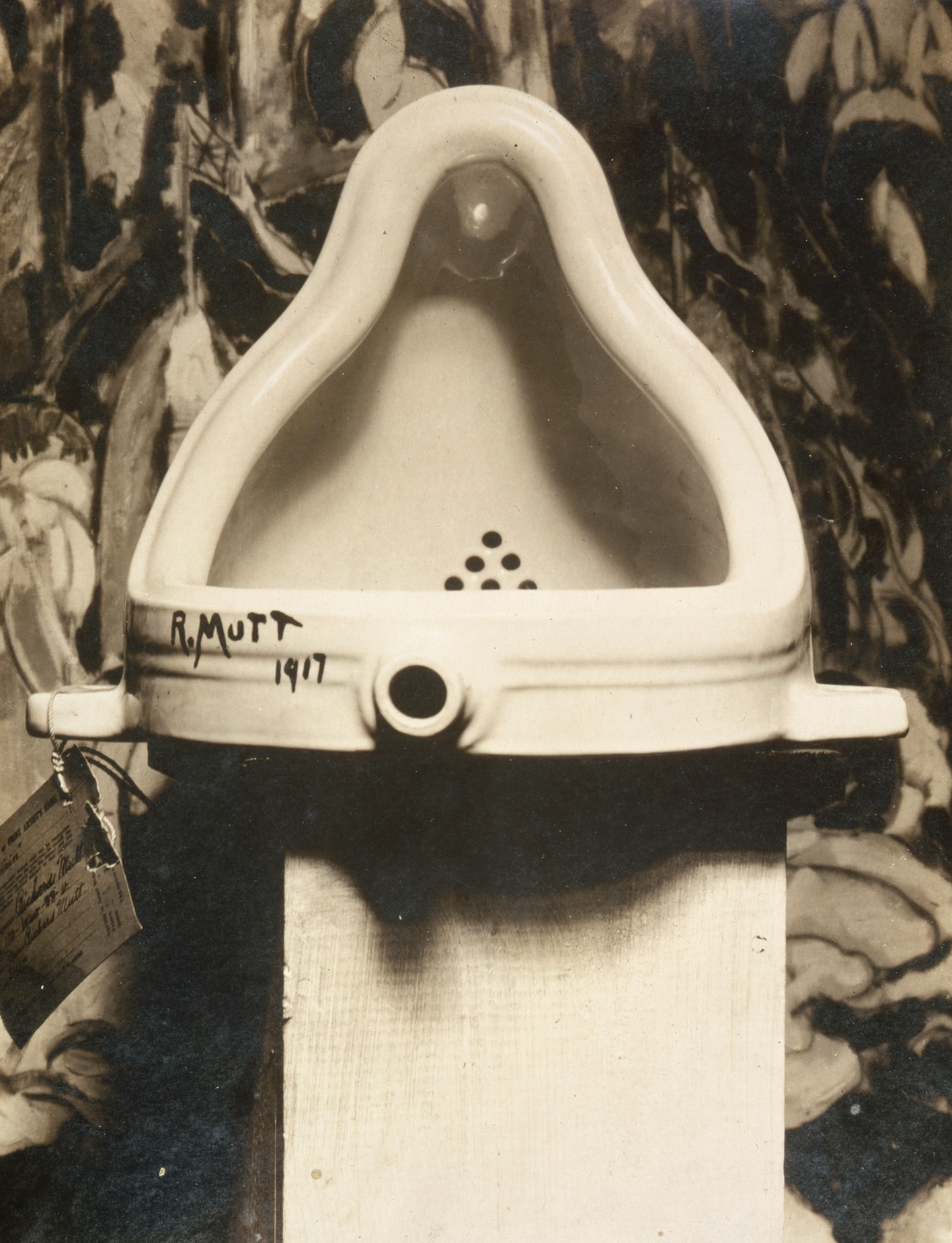
Marcel Duchamp Fountain, 1917, photograph by Alfred Stieglitz at 291 (art gallery) following the 1917 Society of Independent Artists exhibit, with entry tag visible. The backdrop is The Warriors by Marsden Hartley.

Marcel Duchamp arrived in the United States less than two years prior to the creation of Fountain and had become involved with Francis Picabia, Man Ray, Beatrice Wood amongst others in the creation of an anti-rational, anti-art, proto-Dada cultural movement in New York City. Francis Naumann, historian, curator and dealer specializing in the art of the Dada movement, suggests the creation of a work titled Tulip Hysteria Co-ordinating was a rumor circulated intentionally to mislead the public.

At the time Duchamp was a board member of the Society of Independent Artists. The board members—who had expected to see Tulip Hysteria Co-ordinating, and did not know Duchamp had submitted Fountain instead—came to the conclusion that Fountain was not art. Fountain was hidden from view during the show. Duchamp, who had apparently spread rumors about the existence of Tulip Hysteria Co-ordinating, which likely never existed, resigned from the Board in protest. "Fountain", wrote the committee, "may be a very useful object in its place, but its place is not an art exhibition, and it is by no definition, a work of art." For this reason the work was "suppressed" (Duchamp's expression).

Duchamp was well-known in New York for his infamous Nude Descending a Staircase, No. 2, which had created a scandal at the 1913 Armory Show, and the Cubist style of which he had already, by then, dramatically shifted away from.

Contradicting its stated principle of "no jury", the committee of the Independents rejected Fountain, and, as reported in The New York Herald, 14 April 1917:

To-day Mr. Mutt has his exhibit and his $5; Mr. Duchamp has a headache, and the Society of Independent Artists has the resignation of one of its directors and a bad disposition.
After a long battle that lasted up to the opening hour of the exhibition, Mr. Mutt's defenders were voted down by a small margin. "The Fountain," as his entry was known will never become an attraction—or detraction—of the improvised galleries of the Grand Central Palace, even if Mr. Duchamp goes to the length of withdrawing his own entry, "Tulip Hysteria Co-ordinating," in retaliation. "The Fountain," said the majority, "may be a very useful object in its place, but its place is not an art exhibition, and it is, by no definition, a work of art.

Duchamp had perhaps been planning the scandal of ridiculing the board members—and in passing ridicule Cubism—for some time before the exhibition. Weeks earlier, he had promised to present a Cubist painting absurdly titled Tulip Hysteria Co-ordinating. He had already been working on readymades with absurd titles, such as his snow shovel, titled Prelude to a Broken Arm, 1915; Bottle Rack (also called Bottle Dryer or Hedgehog), 1914; and an unpainted chimney ventilator titled Pulled at 4 pins, 1915.

By 1917 Duchamp had already shifted away from Cubism, and away from painting in general. His denunciation away from painting included reference to his own work. Though his last painting on canvas is dated 1918—consisting of cast shadows that refer to three “ready-mades”: a bicycle wheel, a corkscrew, and a hat rack—and was a commissioned work for Katherine Sophie Dreier. She was co-founder of the Society of Independent Artists and the Société Anonyme (along with Duchamp and Man Ray), which had the first permanent collection of modern art in the US, representing 175 artists and more than 800 works of art. The collection was donated to Yale University Art Gallery in 1941.

== The Sun (review) ==
Jane Dixon, a journalist whose writing figured mostly on the social and fashion pages wrote a "story about the exhibition" published in The Sun, 22 April 1917, titled An Outsider Explores Two Miles of Independent Art.

Dixon begins the article setting the tone with a disclaimer, "nothing I say can be held against me." She goes on to cite a certain Worth Colwell, whom she describes as a "press agent of the big show" (P.A.), or "publicity director" (P.D.) "who knows all about everything... Whatever he doesn't know his imagination covers so adroitly an expert could not detect the difference." In Dixon's story, Mr. Colwell "knew art in general and this exhibition in particular from A to Z, backward, forward and both ways from the centre." Mr. Colwell serves as the exhibition guide throughout the article.

Colwell begins the guided tour of the show with a description of a painting, possibly referencing Jean Metzinger's Femme au miroir (not mentioned in the catalogue, but later purchased by John Quinn in 1918: "That: is a picture of a lady combing her hair in front of a mirror." Dixon responds: "I thought it was an advertisement for some dye house... would you mind tipping me off where the lady is hiding herself?" Colwell: "Why, she's right there in front of you. That streak of purple is her hair. The orange triangle is one side of her face and the lemon yellow cube is the other." Dixon breathed "Ah-h" stepping toward the "cubist queen". "Comrade. You have yellow jaundice. I too am suffering from the colorful complaint. Shake... But the lady stared down at me laughing from her octagonal eyes of indigo blue and pea green." Several other works are described by the guide, before he interrupts himself: "I want you to see one of our unique exhibits... It Is really worth studying, especially the name. The artist calls it 'Tulips Hysteria Coordinating.' He says it was inspired by a bed of tulips at the flower show which was held here recently."

"Any one who can think up a name like that ought to be put on exhibition along with the painting". "You don't happen to know what it's about do you?" The guide had no answer, writes Dixon: "That shows how good the artist is at typing up the English language in a knot... his bust belongs in the hall of fame." The guide continues: "Let me see—he has some explanation for it... He says tulips can have hysteria the same as human beings. These tulips he saw at the flower show were having hysteria in the very worst way, throwing a regular fit in fact... And how about the coordinating? Where does that come in? I didn't quite get that... He didn't seem to be exactly clear on it himself. I guess he put the coordinating in to make it more intricate."

Dixon, then, in her own words writes: "No doubt about it. Those were the most hysterical tulips I ever saw in my life. So hysterical were they that every vestige of resemblance to their former symmetrical selves had been lost and they were merely lurid splotches of color running wild on the canvas." And back to the guide Dixon recounts: "You know these cubists do not paint a thing the way they see it. They paint in the way they feel it. There is no attempt to follow form. They just feel the subject, then they transfer their feelings to canvas."

In the actual published catalogue of the exhibition there are only two other works referencing 'tulips', one titled Tulips by Ellen Graham Anderson, and another titled Early Tulips by Rosalie Clements. Yet the catalogue makes no mention of Tulip Hysteria Co-ordinating. Marcel Duchamp is mentioned five times in the catalogue: in the list of directors; as a member of the hanging committee; in a list of members; next to his brother Jacques Villon's address to direct correspondence (c/o); and in the title of a painting by Jean Crotti, Portrait of Marcel Duchamp (Crotti's other entry was titled The Clown); but not as an exhibiting artist.

Artists had until 28 March to submit the description of their artworks for publishing in the catalogue. The Society received no description for either Fountain or Tulips Hysteria Co-ordinating.

The fact that Duchamp's Cubist Tulips were expected, yet had not been listed in the catalogue (just as Richard Mutt's entry), has led to speculation that Duchamp, from the outset, never intended to submit a painting, and that the missing painting formed part of a larger plot, one that would create a stir surpassing by far the one created by his Nude Descending a Staircase, No. 2 entry at the 1913 Armory Show. In the short term Duchamp's plot can be seen as a failure, owing to the practically nonexistent press coverage of his 1917 Independents participation. Yet in the long term, the success of his endeavor is immeasurable, since the work he actually presented as part of his scheme, Fountain, is now regarded as a major landmark in 20th-century art.

== See also ==
- List of works by Marcel Duchamp
- Found object
- Fountain Archive
- Art intervention
- Apolinère Enameled
