= The Bush (Duchamp) =

Painting by Marcel Duchamp

- Artist: Marcel Duchamp
- Year: 1910
- Medium: oil paint, canvas
- Dimensions: 127.3 cm (50.1 in) × 91.9 cm (36.2 in)
- Location: Philadelphia Museum of Art
- Accession: 1950-134-51

The Bush is a painting by Marcel Duchamp from 1910–1911. It is in the collection of the Philadelphia Museum of Art, that acquired it through The Louise and Walter Arensberg Collection in 1950. Its first owner was Dr. Raymond Dumouchel, himself the subject of another 1910 painting by Duchamp, Portrait of Dr. Dumouchel. One of the models may be Jeanne Serre, with whom Duchamp had a relationship and fathered a child, Yvonne, who later became known as Yo Savy. Duchamp noted that the painting marks the beginning of a practice of attaching non-descriptive titles to his work: "Introduce some anecdote without being 'anecdotal'"; the painting did not illustrate a definite theme, but the title created "the possibility to invent a theme for it, afterwards."

Duchamp included a facsimile of The Bush in the Boîte-en-valise.

== See also ==
- List of works by Marcel Duchamp
