= Haptic poetry =

Haptic poetry, like visual poetry and sound poetry, is a liminal art form combining characteristics of typography and sculpture to create objects not only to be seen, but to be touched and manipulated. Indeed, in haptic poetry, the sense of touch (and, to a lesser extent, the other senses) is equal to, if not more important than, the sense of sight, yet both text-based poetry and haptic poetry have the same goals: to create an aesthetic effect in the minds of the intended audience.

== History ==
The history of "poetic objects" may be traced back to the Dada productions of Marcel Duchamp and Kurt Schwitters, and to the surrealistic boxes of Joseph Cornell (among others), as well as Fluxus objects and editions, but an even older tradition of charms, talismans, Gnostic gems, seals, and fetishistic objects exists. A further tradition exists in the use and exploration of braille in the creation of literary texts. Yet another and more recent tradition that feeds into the idea of "poetic objects" is the creation of artist's books.

The ever-widening application of haptic poetics to the burgeoning field of digital art, with the creation of increasingly sophisticated, interactive and virtual environments, has yet to be properly documented.

== Haptic poets ==
Contemporary haptic poets of note include Ian Hamilton Finlay (Scotland), and Ay-O.

== See also ==
- Readymades of Marcel Duchamp
- Why Not Sneeze, Rose Sélavy?
- Kurt Schwitters
- Joseph Cornell
- Fluxus
