= Portrait of Dr. Dumouchel =

Painting by Marcel Duchamp

- Artist: Marcel Duchamp
- Year: 1910
- Medium: oil paint, canvas
- Location: Philadelphia Museum of Art
- Accession: 1950-134-508

Portrait of Dr. Dumouchel is a 1910 painting by Marcel Duchamp. Raymond Dumouchel was a former schoolmate and a student in Radiology, an emerging field at the time (X-rays had been discovered in 1895). Duchamp painted the left hand of Dumouchel surrounded by an aura, suggestive of both the rays he worked with and his healing powers.

In a letter to the Arensbergs, Duchamp writes: "The portrait is very colourful (red and green) and has a note of humour which indicated my future direction to abandon mere retinal painting."

Duchamp included a facsimile of the painting in the Boîte-en-valise.

== See also ==
- List of works by Marcel Duchamp
