= Belle Haleine, Eau de Voilette =

Artwork by Marcel Duchamp, with the assistance of Man Ray

Belle Haleine, Eau de voilette
- Beautiful Breath, Veil Water (English)
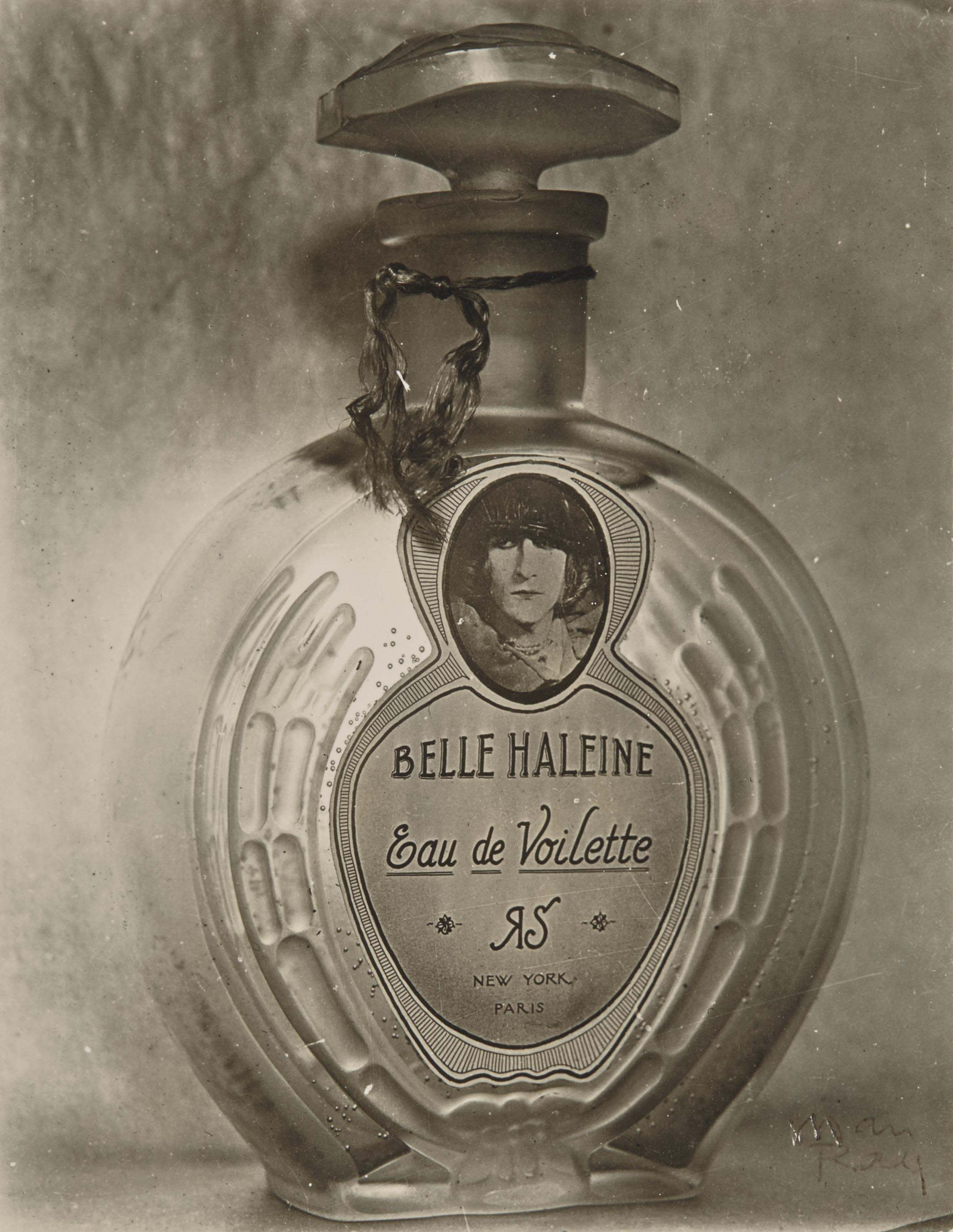
- Marcel Duchamp (Rrose Selavy), Man Ray, 1920–21, Belle Haleine, Eau de Voilette
- Artist: Marcel Duchamp (with assistance of Man Ray)
- Year: 1921
- Medium: Modified perfume bottle with altered label
- Movement: Dada
- Dimensions: 16.5 cm × 11.2 cm (6.5 in × 4.4 in)

Belle Haleine, Eau de Voilette (Beautiful Breath, Veil Water) is a work of art by Marcel Duchamp, with the assistance of Man Ray. First conceived in 1920, created spring of 1921, Belle Haleine is one of the readymades of Marcel Duchamp, or more specifically a rectified ready-made. This "readymade" consisted of a Rigaud brand perfume bottle with a modified label.

In 2009, Belle Haleine, Eau de voilette became the most expensive Duchamp piece ever sold at auction when it brought in €8,913,000 ($11,500,000) at Christie's in Paris, equivalent to €11,978,000 ($17,258,000) in 2023 values. (Note: Previously, an artist's multiple of Duchamp's famed Fountain owned by Arturo Schwarz held the record, selling for $1,762,500 on 17 November 1999 at Sotheby's in New York.)

== Creation and description ==
Its creation involved taking a mundane, utilitarian object, not generally considered to be art, and transforming it by adding a reworked label. Duchamp removed the label from a Parfums Rigaud bottle, then proceeded, with Man Ray, to alter the object in several ways. The new label was specifically created by the two artists for the Rigaud bottle. For this reason Belle Haleine, Eau de Voilette is often referred to as an 'assisted readymade'.

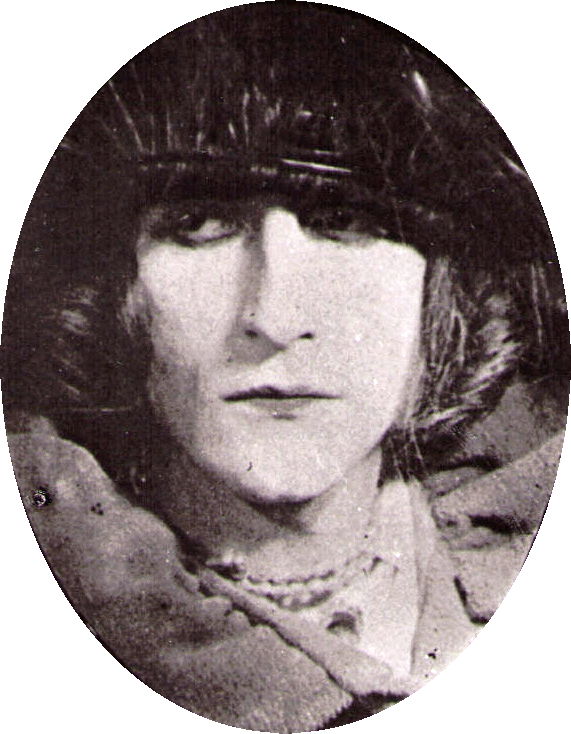
Rrose Sélavy, detail of Belle Haleine label

The model on the label is Rrose Sélavy, an alter ego of Marcel Duchamp and one of his pseudonyms. Sélavy emerged in 1921, on this label, for the first time, though the name was first used to sign a readymade, Fresh Widow, in 1920. Man Ray continued a series of photographs showing Duchamp dressed as a woman through the 1920s. Duchamp later used the name as the byline on written material and signed Rrose Sélavy on several works. The ambiguity of Duchamp in drag is not dissimilar to the image of the Mona Lisa with a goatee and mustache in Duchamp's L.H.O.O.Q. (1919). Mona Lisa became a man, and Duchamp became a woman.

The original label on the Rigaud bottle read "Un air embaumé" (meaning perfumed air, or embalmed air), "Eau de Violette" (or Violet Water). By swapping positions of the "i" and "o" Duchamp and Man Ray obtained "Eau de Voilette" (meaning Veil Water). "Un air embaumé" was replaced with the unapologetic "Belle Haleine" (or "Beautiful Breath"). The "R" for Rigaud became "RS" for Rrose Sélavy.

== Interpretation and meaning ==
The object touches on several issues: authorship, since the label is by Rigaud, Duchamp, and Man Ray; and gender identity, as the woman's perfume now has Duchamp as its principal image. Further sexual connotations arise due to suggestions of smell, touch, and taste intrinsic to the piece.

The title uses the feminine noun "haleine", French for 'breath', evoking the psyche (from the Greek psykhḗ, 'vital breath'). The two cities on the label suggest that both languages are in play: pronounced in a mixture of French and American English, "Haleine" vaguely resembles "Hélène" ("Helen"), a near-homophony reinforced by the adjective "Belle". Helen, daughter of Leda (Euripides, Helen, Prologue, v. 133), was regarded in Greek mythology as the embodiment of ideal beauty. The title of the readymade may echo Jacques Offenbach's La Belle Hélène (The Beautiful Helen), a comic opera in three acts set in Sparta (first performed at the Théâtre des Variétés, Paris, 17 December 1864), which belongs to a parodic tradition of the Homeric legend: its heroine, "Mariée au peu ardent Ménelas" ("Married to the barely ardent Menelaus"), runs away in the finale with her lover Paris (libretto by Henri and Ludovic Halévy). In this reading, Man Ray's part in the work — 'capturing' the photographic image — parallels Paris's legendary capture of Helen. Duchamp had elsewhere played on the double meaning of "Paris" as both the city and the Greek hero.

Presumably, Duchamp drew the principal ideas for the work from Euripides's tragedy Helen, which follows a different plot. [...] In the Prologue of the tragedy, set in Egypt, the protagonist dissociates herself from the familiar Homeric version, revealing that, following the judgment of Paris, the goddess Hera did not give Paris Helen in person as his prize, "but a living image", made in her "likeness out of celestial matter" ("eídōlon émpnoun ouranoũ", Euripides, Helen, vv. 33–34). Her clarification was intended to dispel any suspicion of being in two places at once and to remedy her "shameful reputation" (Ib., v. 135).

After the distinction between image and body is clarified ("eikṑn", "sōma", Ib., v. 588), Helen's double ("eidōlon", Ib., v. 582) "flew into the depths of the ether and disappeared" (Helen, v. 605). Eau de Voilette met the same fate: when the scent-bottle was exhibited at the Duchamp retrospective in Venice (Palazzo Grassi, 1993), it was empty, with only air inside. In this interpretation, since every form calls for a content, the spirit could be sealed in the perfume bottle once more, together with Duchamp's humor — a spirit Duchamp revealed at the very moment he concealed it by artifice, hiding himself under a thin veil ("Voilette"). According to Duchamp's poetics, any observer can perform this act of release.

== Provenance ==
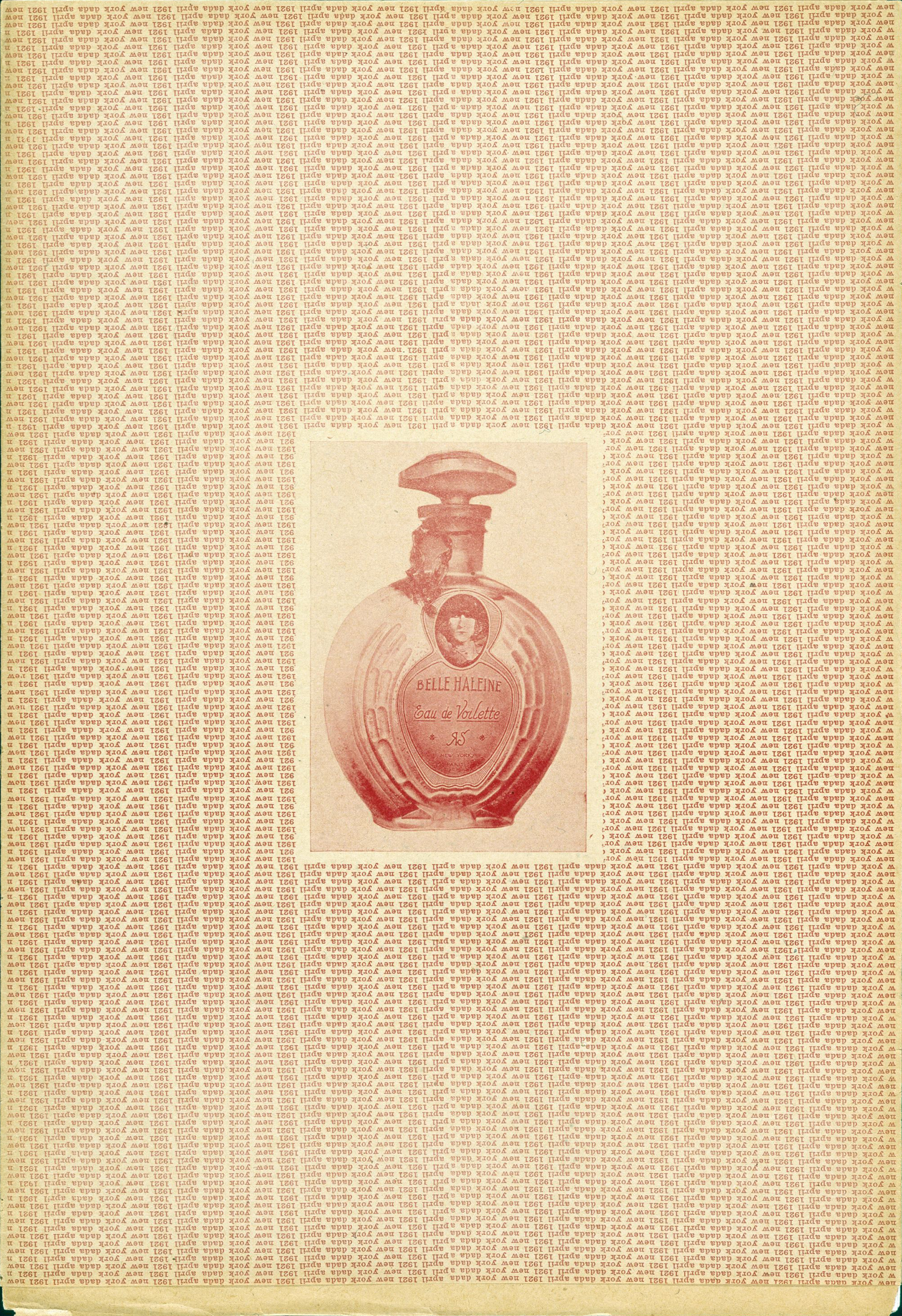
Marcel Duchamp (Rrose Selavy), Man Ray, 1920–21, Belle Haleine, Eau de Voilette. Cover of New York Dada, New York, April 1921

A photograph of the object, by Man Ray, was reproduced on the cover of New York Dada magazine in April 1921.

Shortly after its inception, Duchamp gave the bottle to Yvonne Chastel-Crotti, the ex-wife of Jean Crotti (who eventually married Suzanne Duchamp). Yvonne Crotti kept it throughout her lifetime. The first exhibition within which Belle Haleine appeared was organized by the Cordier & Ekstrom Gallery, New York City, in 1965; though a larger collage version of the label was shown in 1930, at Galerie Goemans in Paris.

== See also ==
- List of works by Marcel Duchamp
