= Bottle Rack =

1914 Readymade artwork by Marcel Duchamp

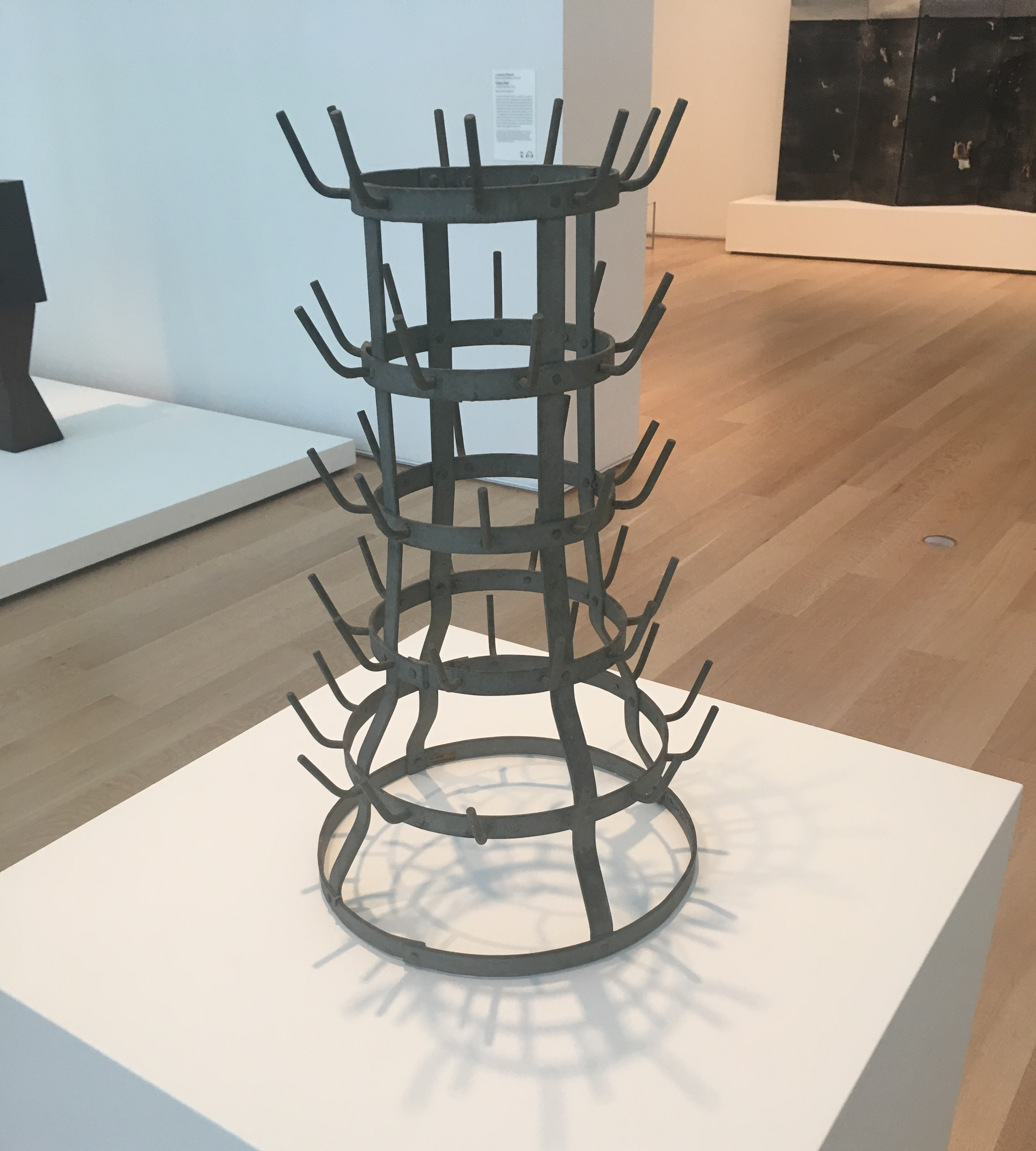
A 1959 replica of the work, on display at the Art Institute of Chicago

The Bottle Rack (also called Bottle Dryer or Hedgehog) (Egouttoir or Porte-bouteilles or Hérisson) is a proto-Dada artwork created in 1914 by Marcel Duchamp. He labeled the piece a "readymade", a term he used to describe his collection of ordinary, manufactured objects not commonly associated with art. The readymades did not have the serious tone of European Dada works, which criticized the violence of World War I, and instead focused on a more nonsensical nature, chosen purely on the basis of a "visual indifference".

The Art Institute of Chicago purchased one of the replicas of Bottle Rack in 2018.

== Origin ==
Duchamp claimed to have bought the Bottle Rack at a department store called Bazar de l'Hôtel de Ville near the Paris city hall. The Bottle Rack was a typical, metal rack used for the drying of bottles, but the spiky, aggressive appearance of the piece earned it the name of Hedgehog. Unlike the earlier Bicycle Wheel (1913) or Pharmacy (1913), the Bottle Rack was not modified in any way, making it the first, "true" example of a readymade. The Bottle Rack also had an inscription scribbled on its side, much like the R. Mutt of Duchamp's Fountain (1917) piece, though the actual words remain a mystery as Duchamp had forgotten the inscription by the time it had been thrown out.

== Legacy ==
The original piece was mistaken as rubbish due to its appearance; it was thrown out by Duchamp's sister and stepsister after the artist left France in 1914 for the US. While the original no longer survives, the legacy of the work lives on, with at least seven replicas, held in museums including the Philadelphia Museum of Art, the Norton Simon Museum, and the Moderna Museet.

Without any actual modifications by the artist, the Bottle Rack is Duchamp's first, "true" readymade. While Duchamp asserted that his readymades were done without any specific reason, art critics contend that the piece has sexual undertones of a Freudian nature. Critics suggest that the metal spikes represent the male genitalia, and that the absence of bottles is a reference to Duchamp being a bachelor at the time, a theme they claim is repeatedly conveyed throughout his works.

== See also ==
- List of works by Marcel Duchamp
- Surrealism
- Found object
- Modernism
