= Monte Carlo Bonds =

Artwork by Marcel Duchamp

- Artist: Marcel Duchamp
- Year: 1924
- Type: Conceptual art; legal document

The Monte Carlo Bonds were a 1924 Marcel Duchamp work in the form of legal documents, created as bonds, originally intended to be produced in editions of 30. The creation of the work came out of Duchamp's repeated experiments at the Monte Carlo Casino, where he endlessly threw the dice in order to accumulate profit through an excruciatingly gradual process.

== Original plan and outline ==
Duchamp first devised of the Monte Carlo Bonds at the Monte Carlo Casino after engaging with a system of his own that wagered in roulette, involving compulsive throwing of the dice in order to gain profit despite the process being excruciatingly slow. At one point, he increased the amount of money that was being wagered, leading to the eventual creation of the Bonds as profit-sealing legal documents that were still equally works of conceptual art that mockingly took advantage of both finance and gambling. They were intended to procure investors, but only the numbered versions of the Bonds entitled their owners to collect shares in the dividends of his company. The bonds prominently feature a photocollage portrait of Duchamp by Man Ray, with soapy hair shaped to resemble devilish horns. In the background, the phrase "moustiques domestiques demi-stock" (domestic mosquitoes half-stock) is looped in small green print.

== See also ==
- List of works by Marcel Duchamp
- Art intervention
- Luck
