= List of works by Marcel Duchamp =

Marcel Duchamp, photograph published in Les Peintres Cubistes, 1913

This is an incomplete list of works by the French artist Marcel Duchamp (28 July 1887 – 2 October 1968), painter, sculptor, chess player, and writer whose work is associated with Cubism, conceptual art, and Dada. His oeuvre includes diverse types of artworks, including paintings, drawings, sculptures, found objects ("readymades"), assemblage, boxes, and installation art.

Duchamp is commonly regarded, along with Pablo Picasso and Henri Matisse, as one of the three artists who helped to define the revolutionary developments in the plastic arts in the opening decades of the 20th century, responsible for significant developments in painting and sculpture.

== Artworks ==
Image	Name	Year	Technique	Dimensions	Location
	The Chess Game (Joueur d'échecs)	1910	Oil on canvas	114 x 146.5 cm	Philadelphia Museum of Art
	Portrait of Dr. Dumouchel; Portrait du Dr. R. Dumouchel	1910	Oil on canvas	100.3 x 65.7 cm	Philadelphia Museum of Art
	’’The Bush’’ (‘’Le Buisson’’)	1910–1911	Oil on canvas	127.3 x 91.9 cm	Philadelphia Museum of Art
	’’Coffee Mill’’ (‘’Moulin à café’’)	1911	Oil and graphite on board	33 x 12.7 cm	Tate
	’’Sonata’’ (‘’La Sonate’’)	1911	Oil on canvas	90 × 74 cm	Philadelphia Museum of Art
	’’Yvonne and Magdeleine Torn in Tatters’’ (‘’Yvonne et Magdeleine Déchiquetées’’)	1911	Oil on canvas	60.3 x 73.3 cm	Philadelphia Museum of Art
	’’Nude (Study), Sad Young Man on a Train’’ (‘’Nu -esquisse-, jeune homme triste dans un train’’)	1911–1912	Oil on canvas	100 x 73 cm	Peggy Guggenheim Collection
	’’Nude Descending a Staircase, No. 2’’ (‘’Nu descendant un escalier n° 2’’)	1912	Oil on canvas	147 × 89.2 cm	Philadelphia Museum of Art
	’’The King and Queen Surrounded by Swift Nudes’’ (‘’Le Roi et la Reine entourés de nus vites’’)	1912	Oil on canvas	114.6 x 128.9 cm	Philadelphia Museum of Art
	’’Bicycle Wheel’’ (‘’Roue de bicyclette’’)	1913	Readymade sculpture		Original is lost
	’’Network of Stoppages’’	1914	Oil and pencil on canvas	149 x 198 cm	Museum of Modern Art
	’’Bottle Rack’’ (‘’Porte-bouteilles’’)	1914	Readymade sculpture		Original is lost
	’’In Advance of the Broken Arm’’ (‘’En prévision du bras cassé’’)	1915	Readymade sculpture		Original is lost
	’’The Bride Stripped Bare by Her Bachelors, Even (The Large Glass)’’ (‘’La mariée mise à nu par ses célibataires, même (Le Grand Verre)’’)	1915–1923	Mixed media on glass	277.5 × 175.9 cm	Philadelphia Museum of Art
	’’Comb’’	1916	Readymade sculpture		Philadelphia Museum of Art
	‘’With Hidden Noise’’	1916	Ball of twine between two brass plates, joined by four long screws, containing unknown object added by Walter Arensberg		Philadelphia Museum of Art
	‘’Apolinère Enameled’’	1916–1917	Gouache and graphite on painted tin, mounted on cardboard		Philadelphia Museum of Art
	Tulip Hysteria Co-ordinating	1917			Lost or never existed
	Fountain (Fontaine)	1917	Readymade sculpture		Original is lost
	Five-Way Portrait of Marcel Duchamp	1917	Gelatin silver print		National Portrait Gallery
	Hat Rack (Porte-chapeaux)	c. 1917	Readymade sculpture		Original is lost
	Tu m'	1918	Oil on canvas	69.8 x 303 cm	Yale University Art Gallery
	50 cc of Paris Air	1919	Readymade sculpture		Philadelphia Museum of Art
	L.H.O.O.Q.	1919	Mass-produced postcard, altered by hand		Private collection
	To Be Looked at (from the Other Side of the Glass) with One Eye, Close to, for Almost an Hour (À regarder d'un œil, de près, pendant presque une heure)	1920	Mixed media on glass	38.5 × 46.5 cm	Museum of Modern Art
	Beautiful Breath, Veil Water (Belle Haleine, Eau de Voilette)	1921	Sculpture	16.5 x 11.2 cm	Private collection
	Why Not Sneeze, Rose Sélavy?	1921	Sculpture		Philadelphia Museum of Art
	Monte Carlo Bonds	1924	Collage / lithograph	31.2 x 19.3 cm	
	Rotary Demisphere (Precision Optics)	1925	Sculpture	148.6 cm × 64.2 cm × 60.9 cm	Metropolitan Museum of Art
	Anemic Cinema	1926	Short film	7 min	
	Fluttering Hearts (Coeurs volants)	1936	Collage / magazine cover design	25 x 32 cm	
	Boîte-en-valise	1941–1971	Suitcase holding small artworks	40 x 38 x 10 cm	
	George Washington (Genre allegory) (George Washington (Allegorie de genre))	1943	Collage	52 x 42 cm	Centre Pompidou
	VVV magazine, no. 2/3	1943	Magazine cover design	28 x 21 cm	
	View magazine, series V, no. 1	1945	Magazine cover design	31 x 23 cm	
	Man Ray "Objects of My Affection" exhibition catalog	1945	Catalog cover design	29 x 23 cm	
	Young Cherry Trees Secured Against Hares cover	1946	Book cover design	24 x 16 cm	
	"Dada: 1916-1923"	1953	Poster/catalog design	97 x 61 cm	
	Étant donnés	1949–1966	Room-sized installation		Philadelphia Museum of Art

== Bibliography ==
- Arturo Schwarz, The Complete Works of Marcel Duchamp, Delano Greenidge Editions, 1995
- Anne D'Harnoncourt (Intro), Joseph Cornell/Marcel Duchamp... in resonance, Menil Foundation, Houston, 1998, ISBN 3-89322-431-9
- Linda Dalrymple Henderson, Duchamp in Context: Science and Technology in the Large Glass and Related Works, Princeton University Press, Princeton, 1998
- Paola Magi, Caccia al tesoro con Marcel Duchamp, Edizioni Archivio Dedalus, Milano, 2010, ISBN 978-88-904748-0-4
- Paola Magi: Treasure Hunt With Marcel Duchamp, Edizioni Archivio Dedalus, Milano, 2011, ISBN 978-88-904748-7-3
- Marc Décimo: Marcel Duchamp mis à nu. A propos du processus créatif (Marcel Duchamp Stripped Bare. Apropos of the creative Act), Les presses du réel, Dijon (France), 2004 ISBN 978-2-84066-119-1.
- Marc Décimo:The Marcel Duchamp Library, perhaps (La Bibliothèque de Marcel Duchamp, peut-être), Les presses du réel, Dijon (France), 2002.
- Marc Décimo, Le Duchamp facile, Les presses du réel, coll. "L'écart absolu / Poche", Dijon, 2005
- Marc Décimo (dir.), Marcel Duchamp et l'érotisme, Les presses du réel, coll. « L'écart absolu / Chantier », Dijon, 2008
- T.J. Demos, The Exiles of Marcel Duchamp, Cambridge, MIT Press, 2007.
- Lydie Fischer Sarazin-Levassor, A Marriage in Check. The Heart of the Bride Stripped by her Bachelor, even, Les presses du réel, Dijon (France), 2007.
- J-T. Richard, M. Duchamp mis à nu par la psychanalyse, même (M. Duchamp stripped bare even by psychoanalysis), éd. L'Harmattan, Paris (France), 2010.
- Chris Allen (Trans), Dawn Ades (Intro), Three New York Dadas and The Blind Man: Marcel Duchamp, Henri-Pierre Roché, Beatrice Wood, Atlas Press, London, 2013, ISBN 978-1900565431
