= Yvonne and Magdeleine Torn in Tatters =

Painting by Marcel Duchamp

- Artist: Marcel Duchamp
- Year: 1911
- Medium: oil paint, canvas
- Dimensions: 60.3 cm (23.7 in) × 73.3 cm (28.9 in)
- Location: Philadelphia Museum of Art
- Accession: 1950-134-53

Yvonne and Magdeleine Torn in Tatters (French: Yvonne et Magdeleine déchiquetées ) is a 1911 painting by Marcel Duchamp, created when he was 24 years old. It depicts two of his younger sisters, Yvonne (1895) and Magdeleine (1898). Magdeleine was the youngest of his sisters and approximately 13 years old at the time. She is also the sitter for Apropos of Little Sister. Both sisters appear, together with their mother in Sonata, and with their older brothers in The Chess Game from 1910. The title is a pun; the French word for tearing, déchiqueter sounds like echiquier, (checkerboard). Duchamp uses a cubist technique, fragmentation, but as he explained in an interview with Pierre Cabanne: "this tearing was fundamentally an interpretation of Cubist dislocation".

== See also ==
- List of works by Marcel Duchamp
