= Pierre Pinoncelli =

French performance artist (1929–2021)

Pierre Pinoncelli (15 April 1929 – 9 October 2021) was a French performance artist, best known for damaging two of the eight copies of Fountain by Marcel Duchamp with a hammer, as a statement that the work had lost its provocative value. The most recent attack happened on 4 January 2006 at Centre Pompidou in Paris and the first at an exhibition in Nîmes on 25 August 1993, where he also urinated into it before using the hammer.

Pinoncelli was born in Saint-Étienne, Loire, France, in April 1929.

He also threw a bottle of red ink over André Malraux, the French minister of culture at the time; robbed a bank in Nice of 10 francs using a sawn-off shotgun; and cut the tip off one of his own fingers at an art exhibition in Colombia, V Festival de Performance de Cali, in protest at FARC guerillas holding the French-Colombian politician Íngrid Betancourt hostage.

Pinoncelli died on 9 October 2021, at the age of 92.
