= Society of Independent Artists =

Art group founded in 1916

Society of Independent Artists was an association of American artists founded in 1916 and based in New York.

== Background ==
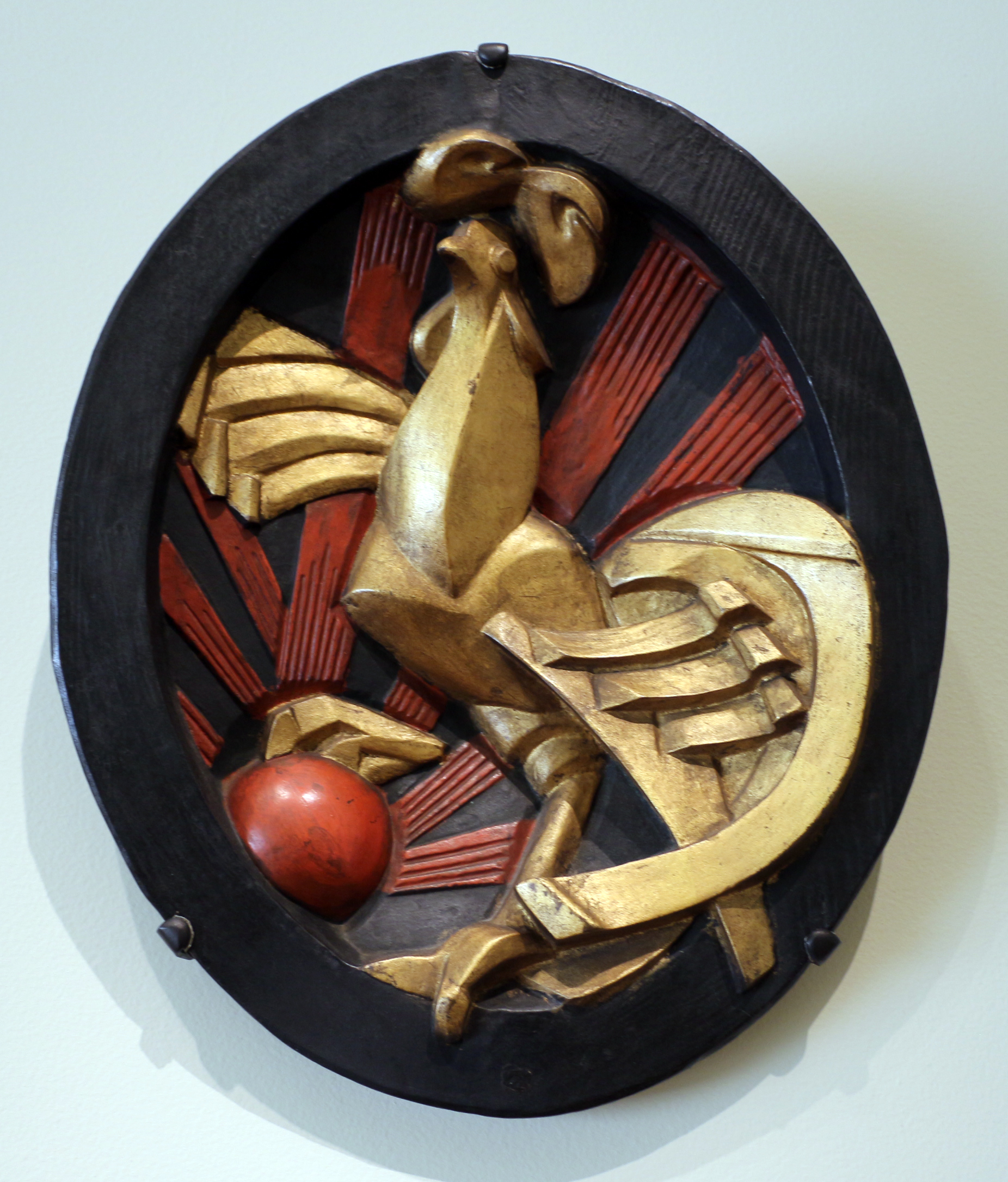
Gallic Cock by Raymond Duchamp-Villon was displayed at the Second Annual Exhibition of the Society in 1918

Based on the French Société des Artistes Indépendants, the goal of the society was to hold annual exhibitions by avant-garde artists. Exhibitions were to be open to anyone who wanted to display their work, and shows were without juries or prizes. In order to enter, one had to pay a six-dollar membership and entry fee. Founders of the Society were Walter Arensberg, Theodore Earl Butler, John Covert, Marcel Duchamp, Katherine Sophie Dreier, William J. Glackens, Albert Gleizes, John Marin, Walter Pach, Man Ray, Mary Rogers (artist), John Sloan and Joseph Stella.

The "First Annual Exhibition" of the society at the Grand Central Palace, New York, April 10-May 6, 1917, included more than 2,000 art works, which the catalog indicates were hung in alphabetical order by the artist's last name. Although there were entries from all over the world, they were predominantly by artists of New York and other East Coast cities.

Marcel Duchamp resigned as a director after the Society refused to include in the exhibition the Fountain — a readymade in the form of a urinal and signed with the pseudonym "R. Mutt." The incident pointed out that the exhibition was not truly open.

Following the first president, William Glackens, John Sloan was president from 1918 until his death in 1951. From 1918 to 1934 A.S. Baylinson served as secretary.

== See also ==
- Tulip Hysteria Co-ordinating
