= Why Not Sneeze, Rose Sélavy? =

Readymade by Marcel Duchamp

Marcel Duchamp. Why Not Sneeze, Rose Sélavy?. 1921/1964. Readymade: 152 marble cubes in the form of sugar cubes with thermometer and cuttlefishbone in a birdcage. 12.4 cm × 22.2 cm × 16.2 cm (4 7/8 in × 8 3/4 in × 6 3/8 in). Private collection.

Why Not Sneeze, Rose Sélavy? is a 1921 "readymade" sculpture by Marcel Duchamp. Specifically, Duchamp considered this to be an "assisted Readymade", this being because the original objects of which the work is made up had been altered by the artist. They consist of a birdcage, 152 white cubes (resembling sugar cubes, but made of marble), a medical thermometer, a piece of cuttlebone, and a tiny porcelain dish. The birdcage is made of painted metal and contains several wooden perches.

The Philadelphia Museum of Art displays the original as part of the Louise and Walter Arensberg Collection. Several replicas exist, made by Duchamp, but only in the original are the cubes stamped "Made in France".

== Explanation ==
About the sculpture, Duchamp said:

"It is a Readymade in which the sugar is changed to marble. It is sort of a mythological effect."

An explanation for the piece given by Duchamp involves the coldness of the marble cubes, the "heat-giving" properties of the sugar cubes, the thermometer evaluating temperature, and the sneezing that can result from cold. In commenting on the title Duchamp pointed out that there is a "dissociation gap" between sneezing at will and sneezing against one's will.

André Breton wrote about Why not Sneeze, Rose Sélavy?:

"I have in mind the occasion when Marcel Duchamp got hold of some friends to show them a cage which seemed to have no birds in it, but to be half-full of lumps of sugar. He asked them to lift the cage and they were surprised at its heaviness. What they had taken for lumps of sugar were really small lumps of marble which at great expense Duchamp had had sawn up specially for the purpose. The trick in my opinion is no worse than any other, and I would even say that it is worth nearly all the tricks of art put together."

== See also ==
- List of works by Marcel Duchamp
- Rrose Sélavy
