= Fountain (Duchamp) =

1917 sculpture by Elsa von Freytag-Loringhoven

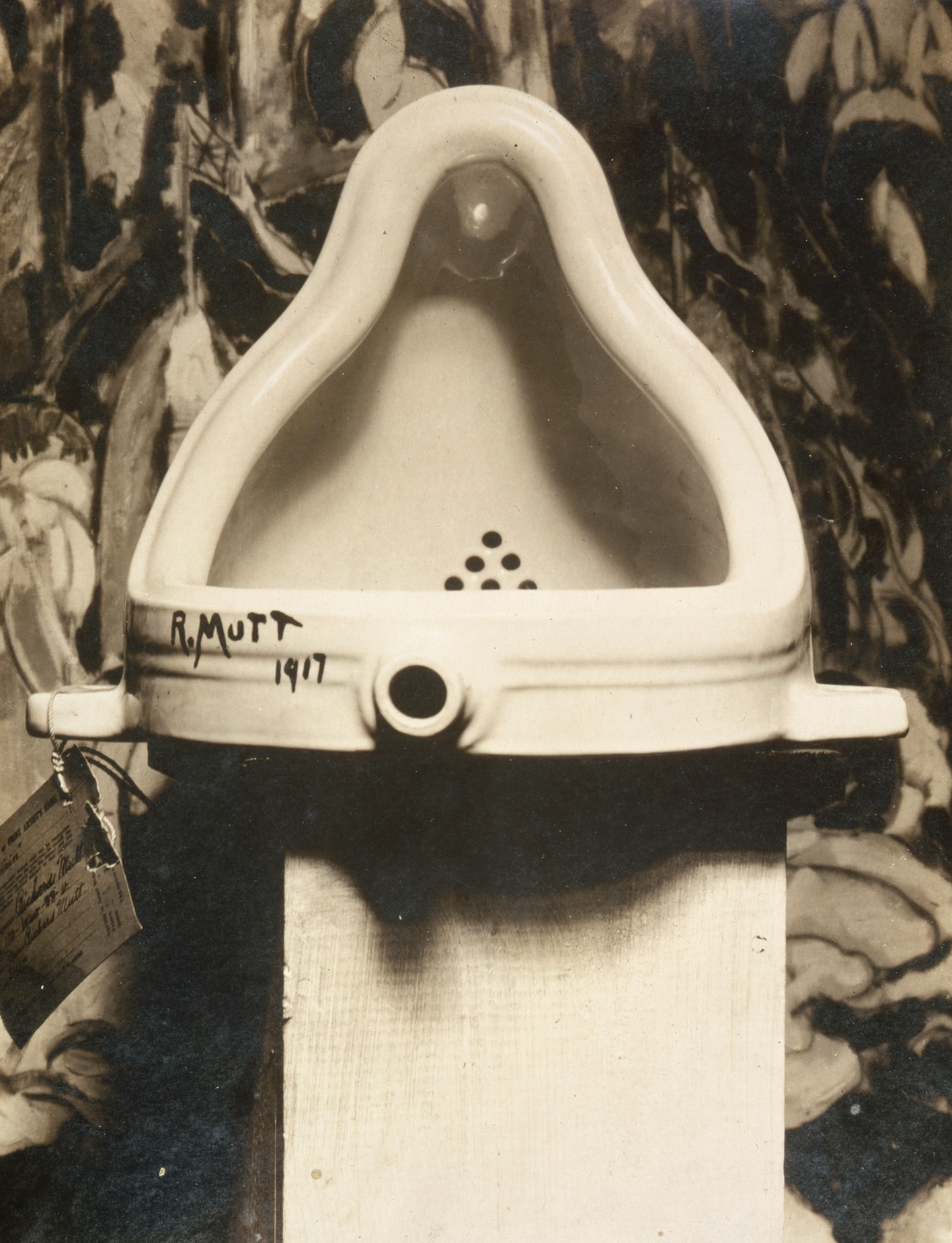
Marcel Duchamp Fountain, 1917, photograph by Alfred Stieglitz at 291 art gallery following the 1917 Society of Independent Artists exhibit, with entry tag visible. The backdrop is The Warriors by Marsden Hartley.

Fountain was a readymade sculpture attributed to Marcel Duchamp in 1917, consisting of a porcelain urinal signed "R. Mutt". The work is regarded by art historians and theorists of the avant-garde as a major landmark in 20th-century art.

In April 1917, an ordinary piece of plumbing was submitted for the inaugural exhibition of the Society of Independent Artists, to be staged at the Grand Central Palace in New York. When explaining the purpose of his readymade sculpture, Duchamp stated they are "everyday objects raised to the dignity of a work of art by the artist's act of choice." In Duchamp's presentation, the urinal's orientation was altered from its usual positioning. Fountain was not rejected by the committee, since Society rules stated that all works would be accepted from artists who paid the fee, but the work was never placed in the show area. Following that removal, Fountain was photographed at Alfred Stieglitz's studio, and the photo published in the Dada journal The Blind Man. The original has been lost. Sixteen replicas were commissioned from Duchamp in the 1950s and 1960s and made to his approval.

In recent years it has been proposed that the original work was by the female artist Elsa von Freytag-Loringhoven who submitted it to Duchamp as a friend. New research from Glyn Thompson, a former professor of art history at the University of Leeds, identifies the handwriting scrawled on the urinal as belonging to Von Freytag-Loringhoven, who was living and working in Philadelphia when the urinal was submitted to the exhibition in 1917. He also labels the urinal as a unique model made by a plumbing shop in Philadelphia—a city Duchamp never visited.

Fountain is included in the Marcel Duchamp catalogue raisonné by Arturo Schwarz; The complete works of Marcel Duchamp (number 345).

== Origin ==
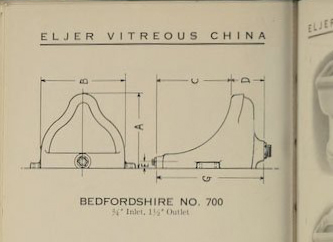
Eljer Co. Highest Quality Two-Fired Vitreous China Catalogue 1918 Bedfordshire No. 700

Marcel Duchamp had arrived in the United States less than two years prior to the creation of Fountain and had become involved with Francis Picabia, Man Ray, and Beatrice Wood (amongst others) in the creation of an anti-rational, anti-art, proto-Dada cultural movement in New York City.

In early 1917, rumors spread that Duchamp was working on a Cubist painting titled Tulip Hysteria Co-ordinating, in preparation for the largest exhibition of modern art ever to take place in the United States. When Tulip Hysteria Co-ordinating did not appear at the show, those who had expected to see it were disappointed. But the painting likely never existed.

The urinal suspended in Marcel Duchamp's studio at 33 West 67th Street, New York, 1917–1918. Two other readymades by Duchamp are visible in the photograph: In Advance of the Broken Arm (1915), and Hat rack (Porte-chapeau) (1917). This photograph is reproduced at the top right of one of the plates from Duchamp's La Boîte-en-valise.

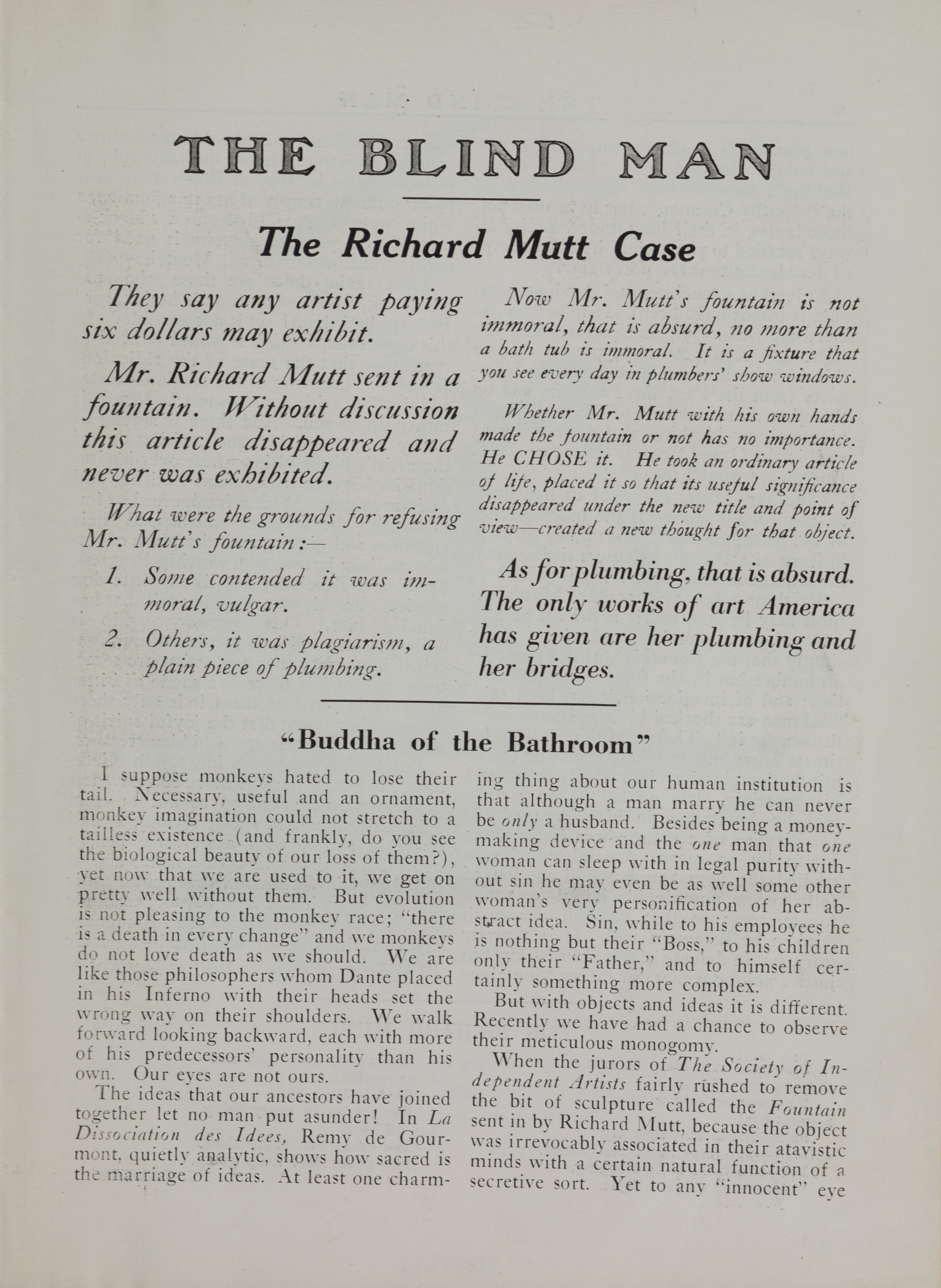
The Blind Man, No. 2, New York, 1917, p. 5, by Louise Norton. The article included a photo of the piece and a letter by Alfred Stieglitz, and writings by Louise Norton, Beatrice Wood and Walter Arensberg.

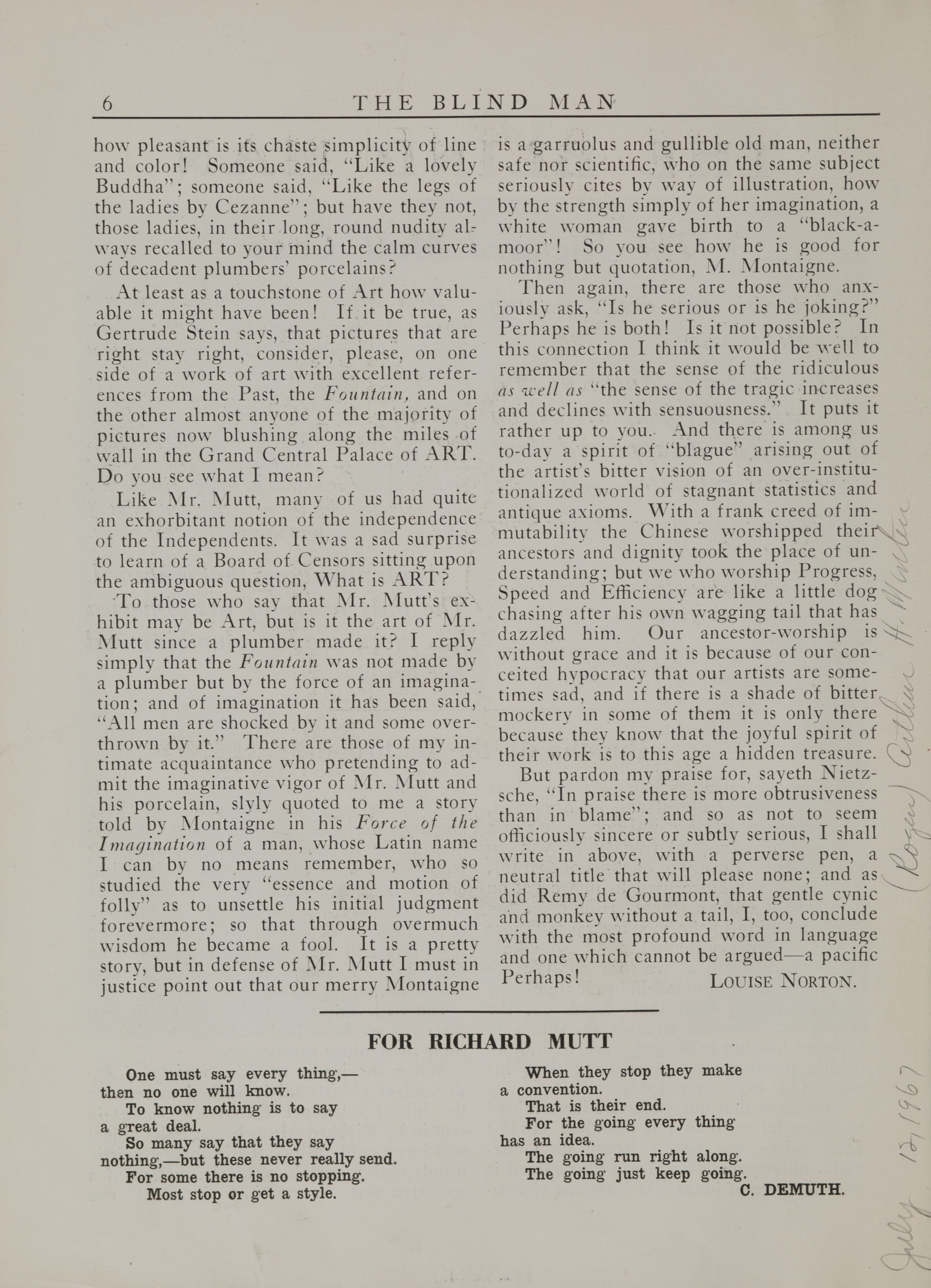
The Blind Man, No. 2, New York, 1917, p. 6, by Louise Norton

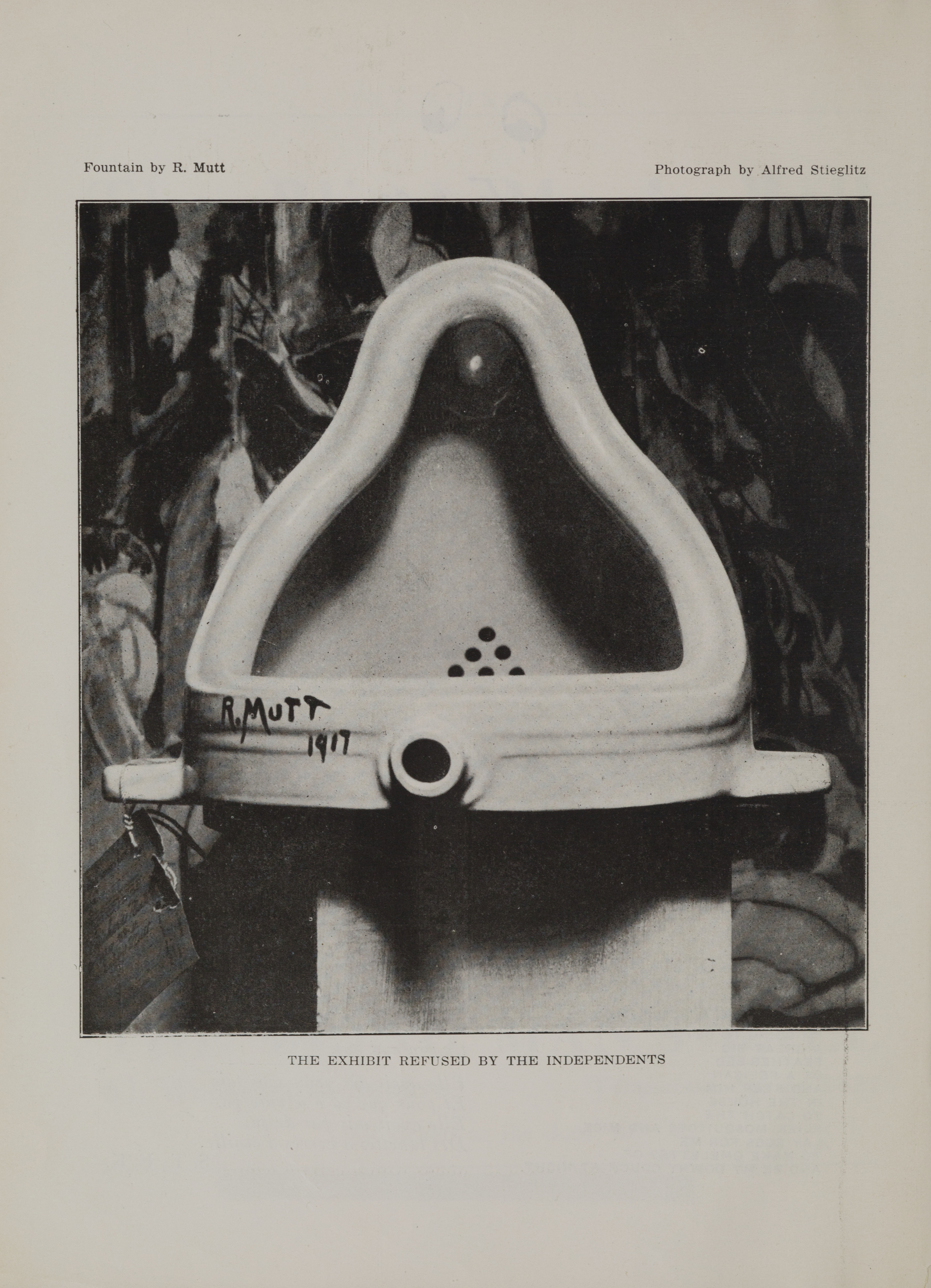
Fountain reproduced in The Blind Man, No. 2, New York, 1917

Jean Crotti, 1915, Portrait of Marcel Duchamp (Sculpture made to measure), mixed media. Exhibited Montross Gallery 4–22 April 1916, New York City. Sculpture lost or destroyed

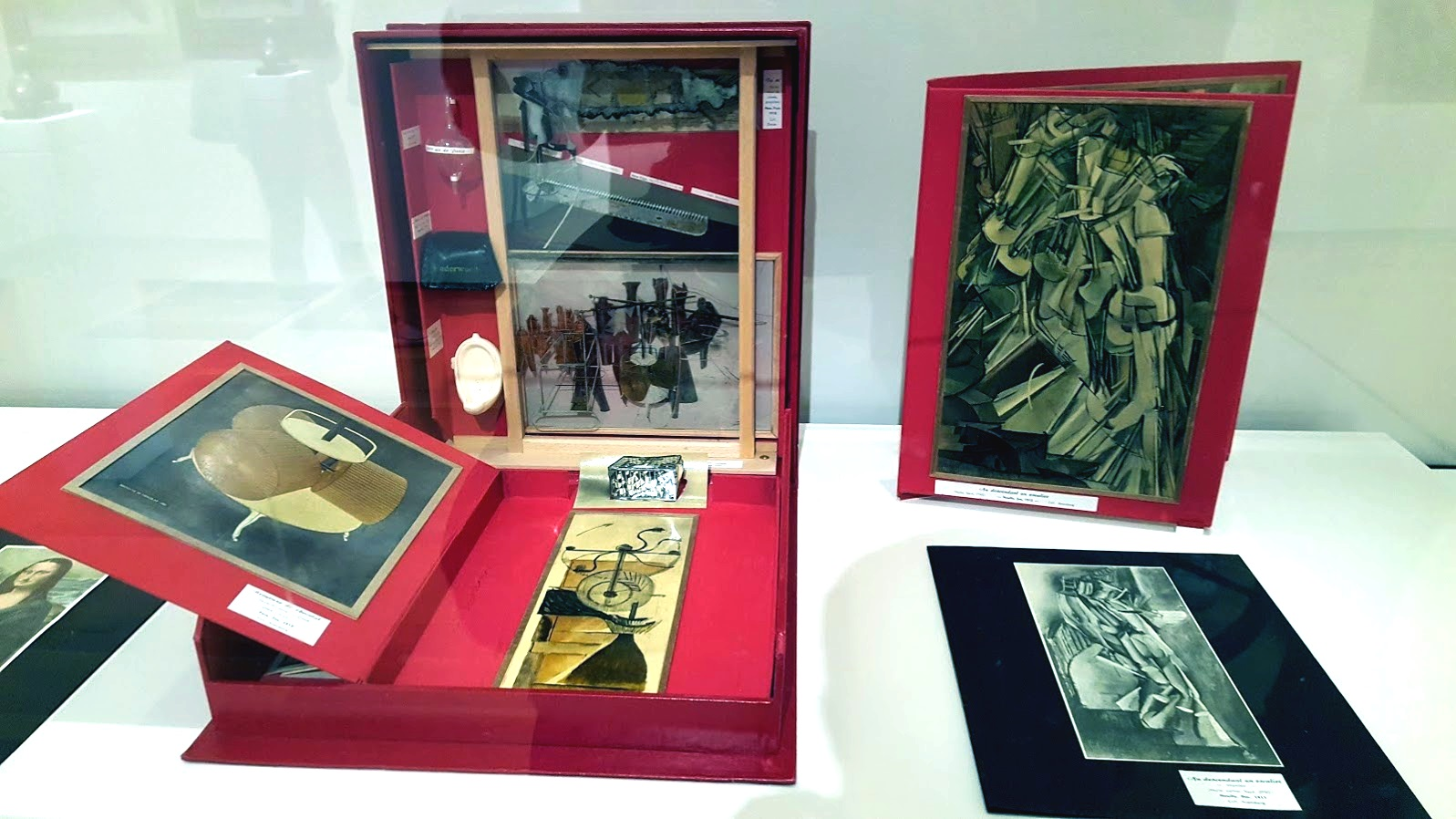
A miniature of Fountain appears in Duchamp's Boîte-en-valise, Cleveland Museum of Art

According to one version, the creation of Fountain began when, accompanied by artist Joseph Stella and art collector Walter Arensberg, Duchamp purchased a standard Bedfordshire model urinal from the J. L. Mott Iron Works, 118 Fifth Avenue. The artist brought the urinal to his studio at 33 West 67th Street, reoriented it 90 degrees from its originally intended position of use, and wrote on it, "R. Mutt 1917". Duchamp elaborated:

Mutt comes from Mott Works, the name of a large sanitary equipment manufacturer. But Mott was too close so I altered it to Mutt, after the daily cartoon strip Mutt and Jeff which appeared at the time, and with which everyone was familiar. Thus, from the start, there was an interplay of Mutt: a fat little funny man, and Jeff: a tall thin man... I wanted any old name. And I added Richard [French slang for money-bags]. That's not a bad name for a pissotière. Get it? The opposite of poverty. But not even that much, just R. MUTT.

At the time Duchamp was a board member of the Society of Independent Artists. After much debate by the board members (most of whom did not know Duchamp had submitted it, as he had submitted the work 'under a pseudonym') about whether the piece was or was not art, Fountain was hidden from view during the show. Duchamp resigned from the Board, and "withdrew" Tulip Hysteria Co-ordinating in protest. For this reason the work was "suppressed" (Duchamp's expression).

No, not rejected. A work can't be rejected by the Independents. It was simply suppressed. I was on the jury, but I wasn't consulted, because the officials didn't know that it was I who had sent it in; I had written the name "Mutt" on it to avoid connection with the personal. The Fountain was simply placed behind a partition and, for the duration of the exhibition, I didn't know where it was. I couldn't say that I had sent the thing, but I think the organizers knew it through gossip. No one dared mention it. I had a falling out with them, and retired from the organization. After the exhibition, we found the Fountain again, behind a partition, and I retrieved it! (Marcel Duchamp, 1971)

The New York Dadaists stirred controversy about Fountain and its being rejected in the second issue of The Blind Man which included a photo of the piece and a letter by Alfred Stieglitz, and writings by Louise Norton, Beatrice Wood, and Arensberg. An editorial, possibly written by Wood, accompanying the photograph, entitled "The Richard Mutt Case", made a claim that would prove to be important concerning certain works of art that would come after it:

Whether Mr Mutt with his own hands made the fountain or not has no importance. He CHOSE it. He took an ordinary article of life, placed it so that its useful significance disappeared under the new title and point of view—created a new thought for that object.

In defense of the work being art, the piece continues, "The only works of art America has given are her plumbing and her bridges." Duchamp described his intent with the piece was to shift the focus of art from physical craft to intellectual interpretation.

In a letter dated 23 April 1917, Stieglitz wrote of the photograph he took of Fountain: "The "Urinal" photograph is really quite a wonder—Everyone who has seen it thinks it beautiful—And it's true—it is. It has an oriental look about it—a cross between a Buddha and a Veiled Woman."

In 1918, Mercure de France published an article attributed to Guillaume Apollinaire stating Fountain, originally titled "le Bouddha de la salle de bain" (Buddha of the bathroom), represented a sitting Buddha. The motive invoked for its refusal at the Independents were that the entry was (1) immoral and vulgar, (2) it was plagiarism, a commercial piece of plumbing. R. Mutt responded, according to Apollinaire, that the work was not immoral since similar pieces could be seen every day exposed in plumbing and bath supply stores. On the second point, R. Mutt pointed out that the fact Fountain was not made by the hand of the artist was unimportant. The importance was in the choice made by the artist. The artist chose an object of every-day life, erased its usual significance by giving it a new title, and from this point of view, gave a new purely esthetic meaning to the object.

Menno Hubregtse argues that Duchamp may have chosen Fountain as a readymade because it parodied Robert J. Coady's exaltation of industrial machines as pure forms of American art. Coady, who championed his call for American art in his publication The Soil, printed a scathing review of Jean Crotti's Portrait of Marcel Duchamp (Sculpture Made to Measure) in the December 1916 issue. Hubregtse notes that Duchamp's urinal may have been a clever response to Coady's comparison of Crotti's sculpture with "the absolute expression of a—plumber."

Shortly after its initial exhibition, Fountain was lost. According to Duchamp biographer Calvin Tomkins, the best guess is that it was thrown out as rubbish by Stieglitz, a common fate of Duchamp's early readymades. However, the myth goes that the original Fountain was in fact not thrown out but returned to Richard Mutt by Duchamp.

The reaction engendered by Fountain continued for weeks following the exhibition submission. An article was published in Boston on 25 April 1917:

A Philadelphian, Richard Mutt, member of the society, and not related to our friend of the "Mutt and Jeff" cartoons, submitted a bathroom fixture as a "work of art." The official record of the episode of its removal says: "Richard Mutt threatens to sue the directors because they removed the bathroom fixture, mounted on a pedestal, which he submitted as a 'work of art.' Some of the directors wanted it to remain, in view of the society's ruling of 'no jury' to decide on the merits of the 2500 paintings and sculptures submitted. Other directors maintained that it was indecent at a meeting and the majority voted it down. As a result of this Marcel Duchamp retired from the Board. Mr. Mutt now wants more than his dues returned. He wants damages."

Duchamp began making miniature reproductions of Fountain in 1935, first in papier-mâché and then in porcelain, for his multiple editions of a miniature museum 'retrospective' titled Boîte-en-valise or 'box in a suitcase', 1935–1966. Duchamp carried many of these miniature works within The Suitcase which were replicas of some of his most prominent work. The first 1:1 reproduction of Fountain was authorized by Duchamp in 1950 for an exhibition in New York; two more individual pieces followed in 1953 and 1963, and then an artist's multiple was manufactured in an edition of eight in 1964. These editions ended up in a number of important public collections; Indiana University Art Museum, San Francisco Museum of Modern Art, the National Gallery of Canada, Centre Georges Pompidou and Tate Modern. The edition of eight was manufactured from glazed earthenware painted to resemble the original porcelain, with a signature, reproduced in black paint.

== Controversy around authorship ==
Some have contested that Duchamp created Fountain, but rather assisted in submitting the piece to the Society of Independent Artists for a female friend. In a letter dated 11 April 1917 Duchamp wrote to his sister Suzanne: "Une de mes amies sous un pseudonyme masculin, Richard Mutt, avait envoyé une pissotière en porcelaine comme sculpture" ("One of my female friends under a masculine pseudonym, Richard Mutt, sent in a porcelain urinal as a sculpture.") Duchamp never identified his female friend, but three candidates have been proposed: an early appearance of Duchamp's female alter ego Rrose Sélavy; the Dadaist Elsa von Freytag-Loringhoven; or Duchamp's close friend, the Dada poet Louise Norton (later married to the avant-garde composer Edgard Varèse), who contributed an essay to The Blind Man discussing Fountain, and whose address is partially discernible on the paper entry ticket in the Stieglitz photograph. On one hand, the fact that Duchamp wrote 'sent' not 'made', does not indicate that someone else created the work. Duchamp's female alter ego has been discredited as the inception of Rrose Sélavy occurred in the 1920s, years after the initial exhibition. Furthermore, there is no documentary or testimonial evidence that suggests von Freytag created Fountain. However, despite a lack of documentary evidence, it has been proven that von Freytag had been experimenting with the concept of bodily fluids as high art in her practice, even collaborating with photographer Morton Livingston Schamberg on the piece, God (1917), which maintains a similar message and aesthetic to that of Fountain. The piece had been attributed to Schamberg until the Philadelphia Museum of Art adjusted the accreditation.

Further arguments against Duchamp as author have included that the R. Mutt, signature makes more sense as a German pun on armut (poverty) or mutter (mother), taking into consideration the geo-political climate at the time and the tension between Germany and the US. Glyn Thompson argues this was Loringhoven's attempt at political commentary. Thompson also disputes Duchamp's own claim (that he made in 1966 to Otto Hanh) of the urinal's origins coming from the J. L. Mott Iron Works plumbing retailer as Thompson discovered they would not have stocked this type of urinal. The signature could not have been inspired by the name of J. L. Mott because Duchamp could not have purchased the urinal there. The only place this urinal could be purchased at that time was in Philadelphia, where Loringhoven was residing at the time, a city Duchamp never visited.

== Interpretations ==
Of all the unaltered readymades by Duchamp, Fountain is perhaps the best known because, according to Dave Praeger, the symbolic meaning of the toilet takes the conceptual challenge posed by the readymades to their most visceral extreme. Similarly, philosopher Stephen Hicks argued that Duchamp, who was quite familiar with the history of European art, was obviously making a provocative statement with Fountain:

The artist is a not great creator—Duchamp went shopping at a plumbing store. The artwork is not a special object—it was mass-produced in a factory. The experience of art is not exciting and ennobling—at best it is puzzling and mostly leaves one with a sense of distaste. But over and above that, Duchamp did not select just any ready-made object to display. In selecting the urinal, his message was clear: Art is something you piss on.

The impact of Duchamp's Fountain changed the way people view art due to his focus upon "cerebral art" contrary to merely "retinal art", as this was a means to engage prospective audiences in a thought-provoking way as opposed to satisfying the aesthetic status quo "turning from classicism to modernity". "The entire point of Fountain was that the importance was not the object but the idea, the gesture, and the reactions the idea prompted."

Since the photograph taken by Stieglitz is the only image of the original sculpture, there are some interpretations of Fountain by looking not only at reproductions but this particular photograph. Tomkins notes:

Arensberg had referred to a 'lovely form' and it does not take much stretching of the imagination to see in the upside-down urinal's gently flowing curves the veiled head of a classic Renaissance Madonna or a seated Buddha or, perhaps more to the point, one of Brâncuși's polished erotic forms.

Expanding upon the erotic interpretation linked to Brâncuși's work, Tim Martin has argued there were strong sexual connotations with the Fountain, linked to it being placed horizontally. He goes onto say:

In placing the urinal horizontally it appears more passive, and feminine, while remaining a receptacle designed for the functioning of the male penis.

The meaning (if any) and intention of both the piece and the signature "R. Mutt", are difficult to pin down precisely. It is not clear whether Duchamp had in mind the German Armut (meaning "poverty"), or possibly Urmutter (meaning "great mother"). The name R. Mutt could also be a play on its commercial origins or on the famous comic strip of the time, Mutt and Jeff (making the urinal perhaps the first work of art based on a comic). Duchamp said the R stood for Richard, French slang for "moneybags", which according to one critic makes Fountain "a kind of scatological golden calf".

Rhonda Roland Shearer in the online journal Tout-Fait (2000) suspects that the Stieglitz photograph is a composite of different photos, while other scholars such as William Camfield have never been able to match the urinal shown in the photo to any urinals found in the catalogues of the time period.

In a 1964 interview with Otto Hahn, Duchamp suggested he purposefully selected a urinal because it was disagreeable. The choice of a urinal, according to Duchamp, "sprang from the idea of making an experiment concerned with taste: choose the object which has the least chance of being liked. A urinal—very few people think there is anything wonderful about a urinal."

Rudolf E. Kuenzli states, in Dada and Surrealist Film (1996), after describing how various readymades are presented or displayed: "This decontextualization of the object's functional place draws attention to the creation of its artistic meaning by the choice of the setting and positioning ascribed to the object." He goes on to explain the importance of naming the object (ascribing a title). At least three factors came into play: the choice of object, the title, and how it was modified, if at all, from its 'normal' position or location. By virtue of placing a urinal on a pedestal in an art exhibition, the illusion of an artwork was created.

Duchamp drew an ink copy of the 1917 Stieglitz photograph in 1964 for the cover of an exhibition catalogue, Marcel Duchamp: Ready-mades, etc., 1913–1964. The illustration appeared as a photographic negative. Later, Duchamp made a positive version, titled Mirrorical Return (Renvoi miroirique; 1964). Dalia Judovitz writes:

Structured as an emblem, the visual and linguistic elements set up a punning interplay that helps us to explore further the mechanisms that Fountain actively stages. On the one hand, there is the mirror-effect of the drawing and the etching, which although they are almost identical visually, involve an active switch from one artistic medium to the other. On the other hand, there is the internal mirrorical return of the image itself, since this urinal, like the one in 1917, has been rotated ninety degrees. This internal rotation disqualifies the object from its common use as a receptacle, and reactivates its poetic potential as a fountain; that is, as a machine for waterworks. The "splash" generated by Fountain is thus tied to its "mirrorical return", like the faucet in the title.

During the 1950s and 1960s, as Fountain and other readymades were rediscovered, Duchamp became a cultural icon in the world of art, exemplified by a "deluge of publications", as Camfield noted, "an unparalleled example of timing in which the burgeoning interest in Duchamp coincided with exhilarating developments in avant-garde art, virtually all of which exhibited links of some sort to Duchamp". His art was transformed from "a minor, aberrant phenomenon in the history of modern art to the most dynamic force in contemporary art".

== Legacy ==
In December 2004, Duchamp's Fountain was voted the most influential artwork of the 20th century by 500 selected British art world professionals. Second place was afforded to Picasso's Les Demoiselles d'Avignon (1907) and third to Andy Warhol's Marilyn Diptych (1962). The Independent noted in a February 2008 article that with this single work, Duchamp invented conceptual art and "severed forever the traditional link between the artist's labour and the merit of the work".

Jerry Saltz wrote in The Village Voice in 2006:

Duchamp adamantly asserted that he wanted to "de-deify" the artist. The readymades provide a way around inflexible either-or aesthetic propositions. They represent a Copernican shift in art. Fountain is what's called an "acheropoietoi," [sic] an image not shaped by the hands of an artist. Fountain brings us into contact with an original that is still an original but that also exists in an altered philosophical and metaphysical state. It is a manifestation of the Kantian sublime: A work of art that transcends a form but that is also intelligible, an object that strikes down an idea while allowing it to spring up stronger.

Others have questioned whether Duchamp's Fountain really could constitute a work of art. Grayson Perry stated in Playing to The Gallery in 2014: "When he decided that anything could be art he got a urinal and brought it into an art gallery... I find it quite arrogant, that idea of just pointing at something and saying 'That's art.'"

=== Interventions ===
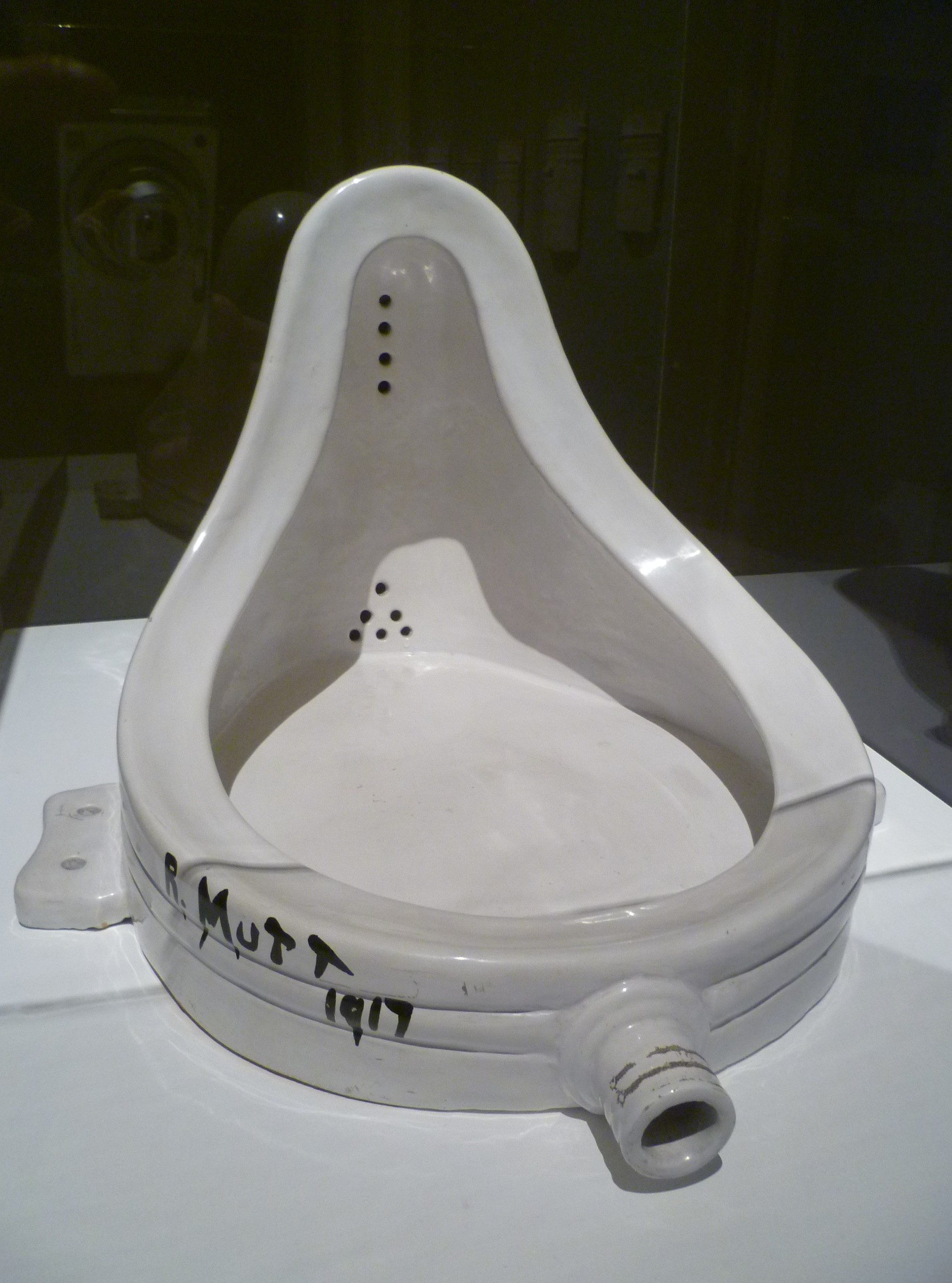
An inexact Fountain replica, Scottish National Gallery of Modern Art

Several performance artists have attempted to contribute to the piece by urinating in it. South African born artist Kendell Geers rose to international notoriety in 1993 when, at a show in Venice, he urinated into Fountain. The musician Brian Eno declared he successfully urinated in Fountain while it was exhibited in the MoMA in 1993. He admitted that it was only a technical triumph because he needed to urinate in a tube in advance so he could convey the fluid through a gap between the protective glass. Swedish artist Björn Kjelltoft urinated in Fountain at Moderna Museet in Stockholm in 1999.

In spring 2000, Yuan Chai and Jian Jun Xi, two performance artists, who in 1999 had jumped on Tracey Emin's installation-sculpture My Bed in the Turner Prize exhibition at Tate Britain, went to the newly opened Tate Modern and tried to urinate on the Fountain which was on display. However, they were prevented from soiling the sculpture directly by its Perspex case. The Tate, which denied that the duo had succeeded in urinating into the sculpture itself, banned them from the premises stating that they were threatening "works of art and our staff." When asked why they felt they had to add to Duchamp's work, Chai said, "The urinal is there—it's an invitation. As Duchamp said himself, it's the artist's choice. He chooses what is art. We just added to it."

On January 4, 2006, while on display in the Dada show in the Pompidou Centre in Paris, Fountain was attacked by Pierre Pinoncelli, a 76-year-old French performance artist, most noted for damaging two of the eight copies of Fountain. The hammer he used during the assault on the artwork caused a slight chip. Pinoncelli, who was arrested, said the attack was a work of performance art that Marcel Duchamp himself would have appreciated. In 1993 Pinoncelli urinated into the piece while it was on display in Nimes, in southern France. Both of Pinoncelli's performances derive from neo-Dadaists' and Viennese Actionists' intervention or manoeuvre.

=== Reinterpretations ===
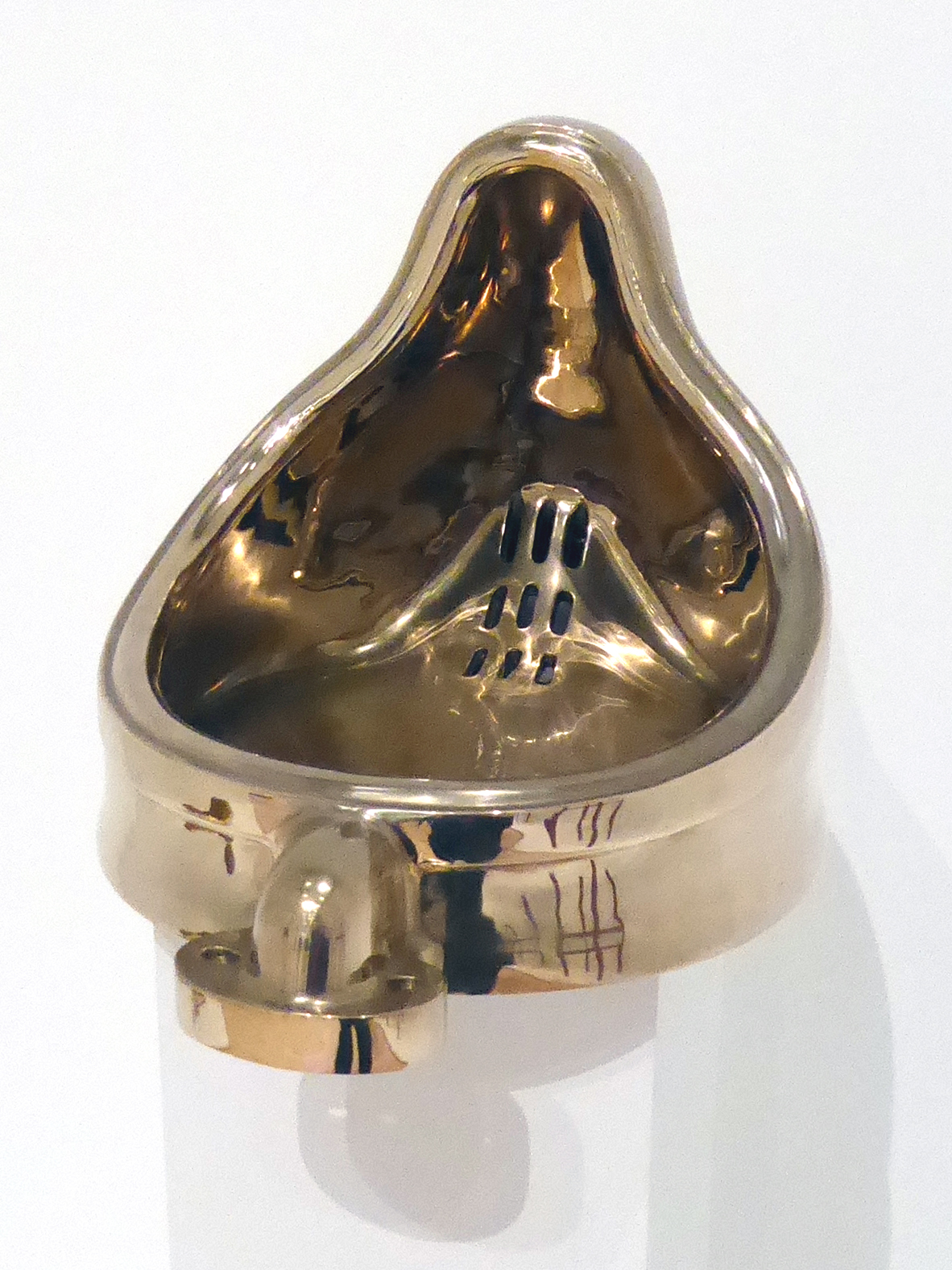
Fountain (Buddha), a bronze remake by Sherrie Levine, 1996

Appropriation artist Sherrie Levine created bronze copies in 1991 and 1996 titled Fountain (Madonna) and Fountain (Buddha) respectively. They are considered to be an "homage to Duchamp's renowned readymade. By doing so, Levine is re-evaluating 3D objects within the realm of appropriation, like the readymades, to mass-produced photographic art. Adding to Duchamp's audacious move, Levine turns his gesture back into an "art object" by elevating its materiality and finish. As a feminist artist, Levine remakes works specifically by male artists who commandeered patriarchal dominance in art history."

John Baldessari created an edition of multicolored ceramic bed pans with the text: "The Artist is a Fountain", in 2002.

In 2003 Saul Melman constructed a massively enlarged version, Johnny on the Spot, for Burning Man and subsequently burned it.

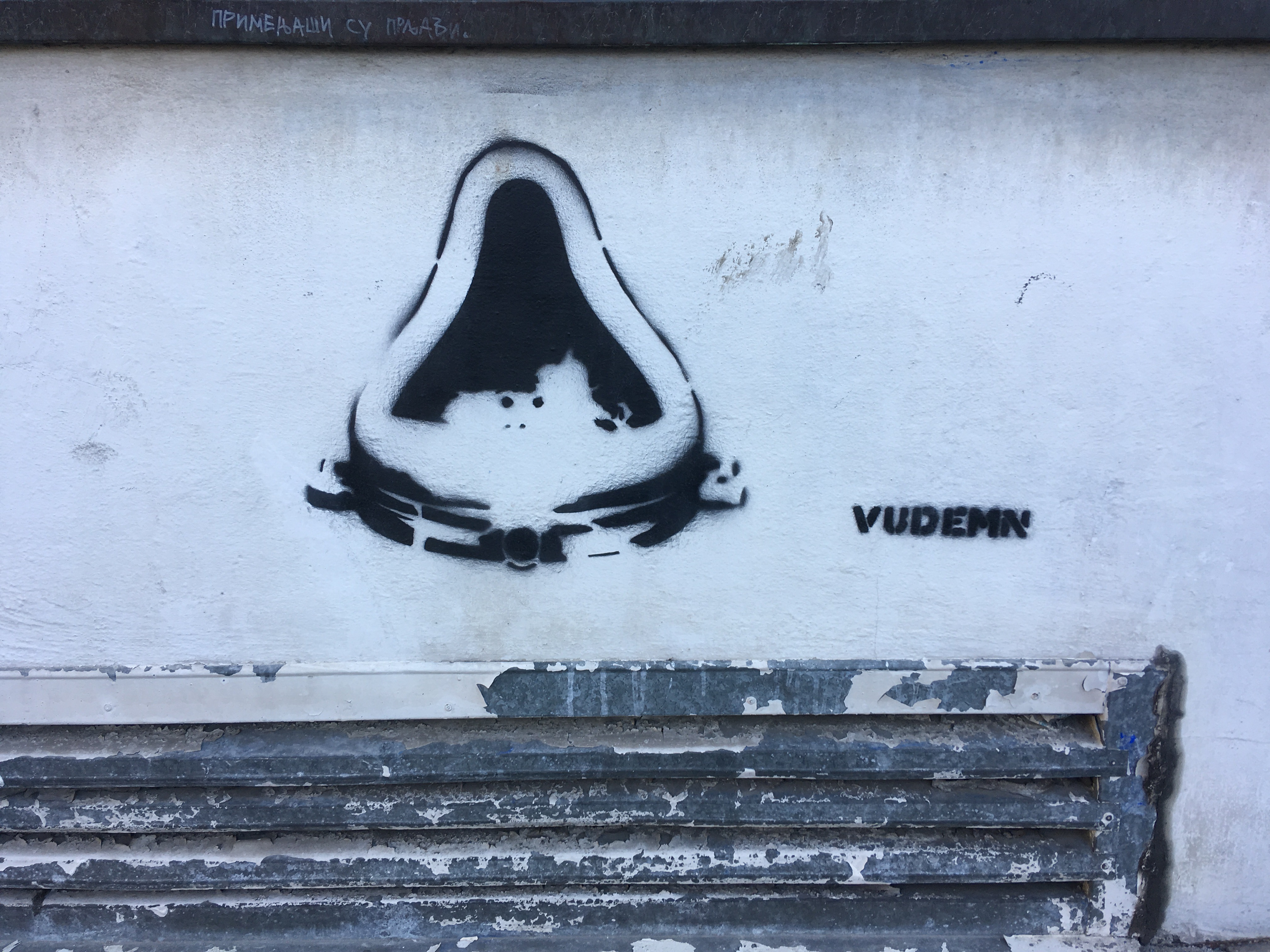
Fountain as street stencil

In 2015 Mike Bidlo created a cracked "bronze redo" of Fountain titled Fractured Fountain (Not Duchamp Fountain 1917), which was exhibited at Francis M. Naumann Fine Art in 2016. "Bidlo's version is a lovingly handcrafted porcelain copy that he then smashed, reconstituted, and cast in bronze."

Exactly 100 years to the day of the opening of the First Exhibition of the Society of Independent Artists, Francis M. Naumann Fine Art opened "Marcel Duchamp Fountain: An Homage" on April 10, 2017. The show included Urinal Cake by Sophie Matisse, Russian constructivist urinals by Alexander Kosolapov, and a 2015 work by Ai Wei Wei.

=== Afterword ===
From the 1950s, Duchamp's influence on American artists had grown exponentially. Life magazine referred to him as "perhaps the world's most eminent Dadaist", Dada's "spiritual leader", "Dada's Daddy" in a lengthy article published 28 April 1952. By the mid-50s his readymades were present in permanent collections of American museums.

In 1961, Duchamp wrote a letter to fellow Dadaist Hans Richter in which he supposedly said:

This Neo-Dada, which they call New Realism, Pop Art, Assemblage, etc., is an easy way out, and lives on what Dada did. When I discovered the ready-mades I sought to discourage aesthetics. In Neo-Dada they have taken my readymades and found aesthetic beauty in them, I threw the bottle rack and the urinal into their faces as a challenge and now they admire them for their aesthetic beauty.

Richter, however, years later claimed those words were not by Duchamp. Richter had sent Duchamp this paragraph for comment, writing: "You threw the bottle rack and the urinal into their face...," etc. Duchamp simply wrote: "Ok, ça va très bien" ("Ok, that works very well") in the margins.

Contrary to Richter's quote, Duchamp wrote favorably of Pop art in 1964, though indifferent to the humor or materials of Pop artists:

Pop Art is a return to "conceptual" painting, virtually abandoned, except by the Surrealists, since Courbet, in favor of retinal painting... If you take a Campbell soup can and repeat it 50 times, you are not interested in the retinal image. What interests you is the concept that wants to put 50 Campbell soup cans on a canvas.

== Editions and provenance ==
Seventeen authorized versions of Fountain have been created, according to a list compiled by Cabinet magazine. Two of them, including the 1917 original, are lost.

- 1917: Original version, lost.
- 1950: Signed by Duchamp at the request of art dealer Sidney Janis for a gallery exhibition. Acquired by the Philadelphia Museum of Art in 1998.
- 1953: "Selected for sale at auction to benefit a friend of Duchamp" in Paris. Location unknown.
- 1963: Made by Ulf Linde for an exhibition in Stockholm. Signed by Duchamp in 1964. Donated to Moderna Museet in 1965.
- 1964: Galleria Schwarz edition
  - Eight versions made for sale:
    - 1/8: Bought by the San Francisco Museum of Modern Art in 1998.
    - 2/8: Bought by Tate Modern in London in 1999.
    - 3/8: Bought by the National Gallery of Canada in 1971.
    - 4/8: Bought by an unnamed collector in 2002.
    - 5/8: Bought by Dimitris Daskalopoulos in 1999 for $1.76 million, a record-high price at the time for a Duchamp work.
    - 6/8: Bought by the National Museum of Modern Art, Kyoto in 1987.
    - 7/8: In the collection of Musée Maillol in Paris.
    - 8/8: Bought by Indiana University Art Museum in 1971.
  - Two artist's proofs:
    - Duchamp's: Bought by the Musée National d'Art Moderne in Paris in 1986.
    - Schwarz's: Bought by an unnamed collector in 2002 for $1.08 million.
  - Two museum versions:
    - I/II: Donated to the Israel Museum in Jerusalem in 1972.
    - II/II: Donated to the National Gallery of Modern Art in Rome in 1997.
  - Prototype version: Bought by Andy Warhol in 1973. Bought by Dakis Joannou from Warhol's estate for $65,750 in 1988.

== See also ==
- List of works by Marcel Duchamp
- Found object
- Fountain Archive
- God (sculpture)
- Art intervention
- Transgressive art
- Apolinère Enameled
- Tulip Hysteria Co-ordinating
- America, sculpture by Maurizio Cattelan
