= In Advance of the Broken Arm =

Readymade by Marcel Duchamp

In Advance of the Broken Arm (digital rendering)
- Artist: Marcel Duchamp
- Year: 1964, Arturo Schwarz. (replica)
- Type: Ready-made
- Location: Yale University Art Gallery; New Haven, Connecticut, United States

In Advance of the Broken Arm, also called Prelude to a Broken Arm, is a 1915 sculpture by Dada artist Marcel Duchamp that consisted of a snow shovel with "from Marcel Duchamp 1915" painted on the handle. One explanation for the title is that without the shovel to remove snow, one might fall and break an arm. This type of humor is typical of dadaist work.

An antidote to what Duchamp called "retinal art", In Advance of the Broken Arm was the second of a series of sculptures that he named "ready-mades", the most famous of which is his 1917 Fountain. At the time, the term "ready-made" referred to manufactured goods as opposed to handmade goods, but Duchamp used the term to describe "an ordinary object elevated to the dignity of a work of art by the mere choice of an artist".

The original was hung from a wire in Duchamp's studio and has since been lost. A replica of the sculpture is on display at the Yale University Art Gallery in New Haven, Connecticut.

== See also ==
- List of works by Marcel Duchamp
