= Bicycle Wheel =

1913 sculpture by Marcel Duchamp

- Artist: Marcel Duchamp
- Year: 1916-17
- Location: Original studio photograph. Shown to the left is the 2nd version of Bicycle Wheel, 1916-17. The original 1913 version and this 2nd version are lost. There are no known representations of the original 1913 Bicycle Wheel and Stool.

Bicycle Wheel is an early readymade created by French artist Marcel Duchamp in 1913. Consisting of a bicycle wheel mounted upside down on a wooden stool, it is often considered one of the earliest examples of kinetic sculpture. Although later categorized as a readymade, Bicycle Wheel was not originally intended as an artwork.

== Background and conception ==
Duchamp created Bicycle Wheel without a clear artistic aim, later describing it as "just a distraction". At the time, the concept of the readymade had not yet been formulated, as it would only emerge in 1915. This has led to scholarly debate about whether the object or the idea came first, especially since Duchamp wrote in 1913 about the possibility of making works that were "not works of art". Duchamp also emphasized that the piece reduced artistic creation to a mental decision rather than manual skill, reflecting his rejection of traditional craftsmanship.

== Description and kinetic form ==
The work consists of a functional bicycle wheel attached to a stationary stool. While the wheel can be spun, the object cannot be used as a bicycle. Scholars argue that this distinction highlights the contrast between the practical function of everyday objects and the purposelessness of art. By using materials that viewers routinely handle in their everyday lives, Duchamp also implicitly called into question the idea that artworks are made to be seen but not touched.

Duchamp, Nude Descending a Staircase No. 2, 1912

Duchamp connected Bicycle Wheel to his earlier painting Nude Descending a Staircase, No. 2, stating that both works explored the idea of movement. In contrast to the painting, however, Bicycle Wheel produces actual motion through the spinning wheel rather than representing it visually. It remains the only kinetic object Duchamp produced until his later Rotary Glass Plates in 1920.

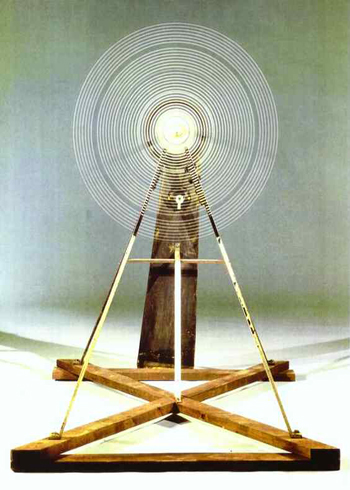
Duchamp, Rotary Glass Plates, 1920

== Replicas and exhibition ==
The original 1913 version of Bicycle Wheel has been lost or destroyed, making it impossible to verify the exact form of later versions. Duchamp recreated the work in 1921 and signed it after the original disappeared. Several authorized replicas followed. Sidney Janis produced a version in 1950, featuring a curved fork, exhibited in Climax in the XXth Century Art: 1913. Richard Hamilton created another replica with Duchamp's approval. Duchamp inscribed it "pour copie conforme", certifying it as a true copy. In the 1960s, Duchamp authorized Arturo Schwarz to produce a limited edition of replicas, using separate blueprints for the fork and stool.

Bicycle Wheel has been displayed in exhibitions that emphasize its visual effects, particularly the shadows it casts. Duchamp himself explored this aspect in photographs focusing on the shadows of his readymades. His painting Tu m' from 1918 also includes a shadow cast by Bicycle Wheel. A later publication, Octavio Paz's Marcel Duchamp ou le château de la pureté, released by Editions Claude Givaudan, included images of shadows from Bicycle Wheel and Bottle Rack, which only form a complete image when assembled together.

== Interpretation and legacy ==
Duchamp described Bicycle Wheel as opening "avenues on other things than material life of everyday", suggesting that the work encourages viewers to think differently about ordinary, functional objects. He also emphasized that it reduced aesthetic judgement to a mental decision, rejecting the importance of manual skill in art making.

Scholars believe that the work highlights the contrast between usefulness and uselessness, as a wheel can spin but it cannot function as a bicycle, questioning how value is assigned to objects. It has also been interpreted as addressing the challenge of representing movement, since it produces real motion rather than depicting it visually.

== See also ==
- Found object
- Lumino kinetic art
- List of works by Marcel Duchamp
- Readymades of Marcel Duchamp
