= De ou par Marcel Duchamp ou Rrose Sélavy (La Boîte-en-valise) =

Work by Marcel Duchamp

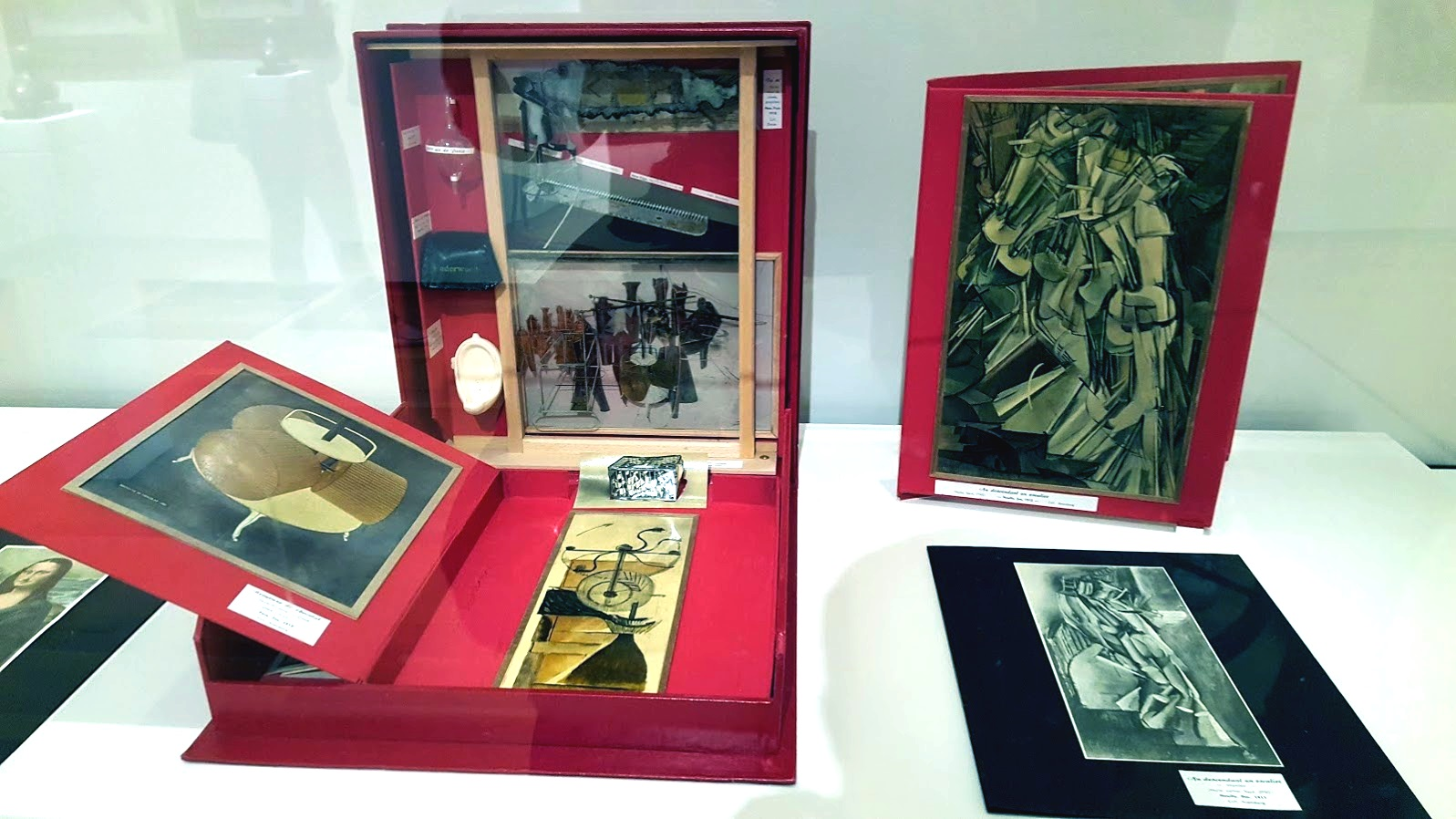
Duchamp's Boîte-en-valise, Cleveland Museum of Art

La Boîte-en-valise (box in a suitcase) is a type of mixed media assemblage by Marcel Duchamp consisting of a group of reproductions of the artist's works inside a box that was, in some cases, accompanied by a leather valise or suitcase. Duchamp made multiple versions of this type between 1935 and 1966. Titled From or by Marcel Duchamp or Rrose Sélavy (The Box in a Valise) (de ou par Marcel Duchamp ou Rrose Sélavy [Boîte-en-valise]), Duchamp conceived of the boxes as a portable museum:

Instead of painting something new, my aim was to reproduce the paintings and objects I liked and collect them in as small a space as possible. I did not know how to go about it. I first thought of a book, but I did not like the idea. Then it occurred to me that it could be a box in which all my works would be collected and mounted like in a small museum, a portable museum, so to speak. This is it, this valise.

== Design ==
Launched in 1935 and sold from 1941 by subscription in the United States, the box-in-a-suitcase is based on the idea of the condensed universe of the boîte surréaliste and a cabinet of curiosities as a portable museum.

The work consists of a brown leather carrying case (the prospectus describes it as a "leather pull-out box"), 40 x 37.5 x 8.2 cm, containing 69 reproductions of the major works by Duchamp, including many photographs, lithographs and miniature replicas of ready-mades like Fountain, and reduced-sizes models on Rhodoïd (cellulose acetate) such as The Bride Stripped Bare by Her Bachelors, Even.

From 1941 to 1966, 312 boxes were produced for subscribers. The first series, numbered I/X through XX/XX, (known as luxury editions) contain an original work by Duchamp on the inside lid of the case. All are signed "De ou par Marcel Duchamp ou Rrose Sélavy" ("From or by Marcel Duchamp or Rrose Sélavy").

In 1935, Duchamp wrote in a letter to Katherine Dreier: "I want to make, sometime, an album of approximately all the things I produced."

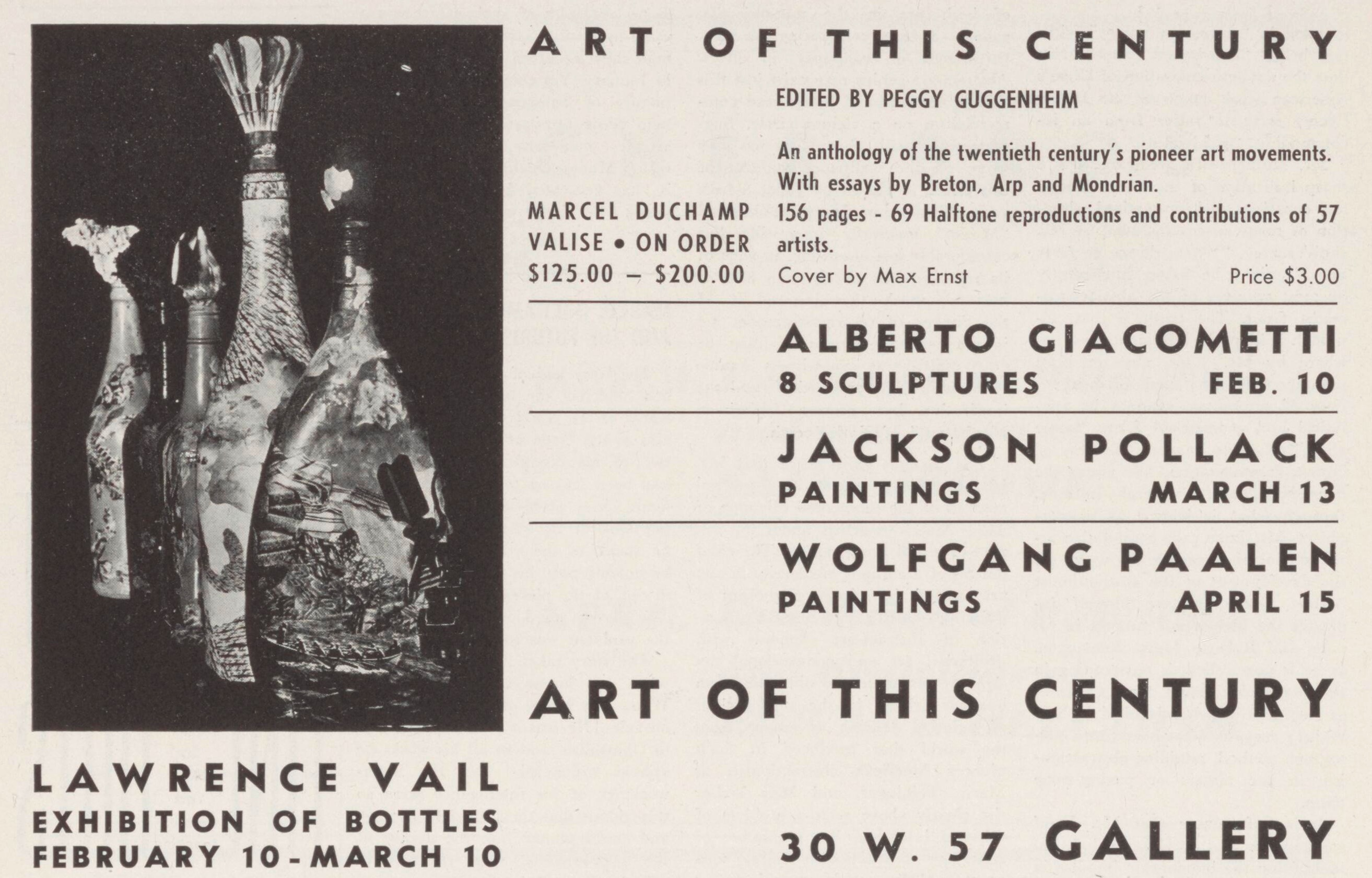
1945 advertisement for the Art of This Century gallery, listing the Valise for sale for $125 to $200

Between 1935 and 1941, Duchamp create several boxes called The Box in a Valise or From or by Marcel Duchamp or Rrose Selavy, that contained three 3-dimensional replicas of his works; Paris Air, Underwood and Fountain. The work was released in seven series, A through G. The first series, A, is numbered I/XX though XX/XX and is a deluxe edition containing an original work of art, mounted in the lid of the box. It contains replicas of Duchamp's works mounted in a wooden frame that slide out in two wings, steadied by brass clips. The case contains 69 reproductions. The colour reproductions were produced using an already obsolete technique called pochoir, where a stencil was used to apply colour to a black-and-white reproduction, making every image, in a way, an original. The Large Glass is reproduced on Rhodoïd (cellulose acetate). The works in the deluxe edition consist of a plywood box, fitted inside a leather-covered suitcase. When the box is opened, the frame is exposed in the form of an "M" for "Marcel".

The color reproductions created using the pochoir technique took approximately 8 weeks to make. They were based on extensive colour notes taken by Duchamp, who travelled to visit each work and take notes. Prints contain approximately 30 individual colours. Duchamp eventually tired of creating the boxes himself and hired assistants to aid in their construction, including Xenia Cage and Joseph Cornell.

Around the same time that Duchamp worked on the Box in a Valise, Walter Benjamin published The Work of Art in the Age of Mechanical Reproduction. While Benjamin lamented the loss of the artwork's aura, Duchamp appears to have embraced it. Duchamp delighted in the fact that critics at the time still clung to the auratic notion of the singular art work and considered the work a print edition, not a work of art in itself. Benjamin himself, on the other hand, in 1937 in his diary noted: "Saw Duchamp this morning, same café on the Boulevard St. Germain. Showed me his painting, Nude Descending a Staircase, in a reduced format, coloured by hand, en-pochoir. Breathtakingly beautiful." Rosalind Krauss describes how the reproductions became originals (stamped by the artist's hand), yet resisted the notion of artistic singularity in both their status as prints and their identities as miniaturized copies of singular artworks.

The reproductions carry a stamp from a notary, who authenticated the facsimiles at the request of Duchamp. As scholar David Joselit argues, though the reproductions appear to be commemorating Duchamp's oeuvre to consolidate his artistic reputation, the compulsive act of repetition both constitutes and destroys the self: Duchamp treats his own identity as a readymade.

== Series ==
The work was released in seven series, A through G, between 1941 and 1971, with a total of more than 300 copies.

The first series, A, is numbered from I/XX to XX/XX and is a deluxe edition containing an original work of art mounted in the lid of the box. It was sold between 1941 and 1949.

Series B comprised 60 to 75 boxes sold between 1941 and 1954.

Series C, of 30 boxes, was produced in 1958 in Paris, assembled by Ilia Zdanevich.

Series D and E, with 30 boxes each, were produced in 1961 and 1963, respectively, by Jaqueline Matisse Monnier, Duchamp's stepdaughter, in Paris.

Series F was produced in Milan by Arturo Schwarz in 1966, with 75 copies in a red leather valise. In addition to the standard 68 works in the previous series, the F series contains 12 additional works, including the Wedge of Chastity and Objet-dart.

Schwarz produced 47 boxes for Series G from 1966 to 1971, continuing even after Duchamp died in 1968.

== Legacy ==
The Fluxus group borrowed the idea of the Boite-en-valise for their Fluxkits.

== Museum collections ==
- Akron Art Museum
- Centre Pompidou
- Davison Art Center
- Museum of Contemporary Art, Chicago
- National Gallery of Art
- National Gallery of Canada
- San Francisco Museum of Modern Art
- National Museum of Modern and Contemporary Art, Seoul

=== Series A 1941–49 ===
- Art Institute of Chicago (No. 0/XX for Mary Reynolds)
- Legion of Honor (No. VII/XX)
- Museum of Modern Art (No. IX/XX)
- Peggy Guggenheim Collection (No. I/XX)
- Philadelphia Museum of Art (No. 0/XX for Walter and Louise Arensberg)
- Scottish National Gallery of Modern Art (No. II/XX)
- Staatliches Museum Schwerin
- Stedelijk Museum (No. XX/XX)
- Yale University Art Gallery (No. 0/XX for Katherine Dreier)

=== Series B 1941–54 ===
- Kemper Art Museum
- Weisman Art Museum

=== Series C 1958 ===
- Museum of Modern Art

=== Series D 1961 ===
- Metropolitan Museum of Art
- Minneapolis Institute of Art
- Munson-Williams-Proctor Arts Institute
- Norton Simon Museum

=== Series E 1963 ===
- Cincinnati Museum of Art
- Smart Museum of Art

=== Series F 1966 ===
- Cleveland Museum of Art
- Hood Museum of Art
- Israel Museum
- Los Angeles County Museum of Art
- M+
- Museum of Modern Art
- Philadelphia Museum of Art
- Portland Art Museum
- Smart Museum of Art
- Staatliches Museum Schwerin
- Whitney Museum of American Art

== Bibliography ==
- Bonk, Ecke (1989). Marcel Duchamp the box in a valise: de ou par Marcel Duchamp ou Rrose Selavy. New York, NY: Rizzoli. OCLC 993482738.

== See also ==
- List of works by Marcel Duchamp
- fr:Boîte (surréaliste)
- Artist's book
