= Readymades of Marcel Duchamp =

Series of artworks by Marcel Duchamp

Marcel Duchamp's studio at 33 West 67th Street, New York City, 1917–18. Shown to the left is the 2nd version of Bicycle Wheel, 1916–17. The original 1913 version and this 2nd version are lost. The coatrack, titled Trap (Trébuchet), 1917, is on the floor, lower left.

The readymades of Marcel Duchamp are ordinary manufactured objects that the artist selected and modified, as an antidote to what he called "retinal art". By simply choosing the object (or objects) and repositioning or joining, titling and signing it, the found object became art.

Duchamp was not interested in what he called "retinal art"—art that was only visual—and sought other methods of expression. As an antidote to retinal art he began creating readymades in 1914, when the term was commonly used in the United States to describe manufactured items to distinguish them from handmade goods.

He selected the pieces on the basis of "visual indifference", and the selections reflect his sense of irony, humor and ambiguity: he said "it was always the idea that came first, not the visual example ... a form of denying the possibility of defining art."

The first definition of "readymade" appeared in André Breton and Paul Éluard's Dictionnaire abrégé du Surréalisme: "an ordinary object elevated to the dignity of a work of art by the mere choice of an artist". While published under the name of Marcel Duchamp (or his initials, "MD", to be precise), André Gervais nevertheless asserts that Breton wrote this particular dictionary entry.

Duchamp only made a total of 13 readymades over a period of time of 30 years. He felt that he could only avoid the trap of his own taste by limiting output, though he was aware of the contradiction of avoiding taste, yet also selecting an object. Taste, he felt, whether "good" or "bad", was the "enemy of art".

His conception of the readymade changed and developed over time. "My intention was to get away from myself", he said, "though I knew perfectly well that I was using myself. Call it a little game between 'I' and 'me'".

Duchamp was unable to define or explain his opinion of readymades: "The curious thing about the readymade is that I've never been able to arrive at a definition or explanation that fully satisfies me." Much later in life Duchamp said, "I'm not at all sure that the concept of the readymade isn't the most important single idea to come out of my work."

Robert Fulford described Duchamp's readymades as expressing "an angry nihilism".

== The objects themselves ==
By submitting some of them as art to art juries, the public, and his patrons, Duchamp challenged conventional notions of what is, and what is not, art. Some were rejected by art juries and others went unnoticed at art shows.

Most of his early readymades have been lost or discarded, but years later he commissioned reproductions of many of them.

== Types of readymades ==
- Readymades - un-altered objects
- Assisted readymades - putting several readymades together taking away their use
- Rectified readymades - an altered or marked readymade
- Corrected readymades
- Reciprocal readymades - a unique art work presented as a mass-produced utilitarian object

== Readymades ==
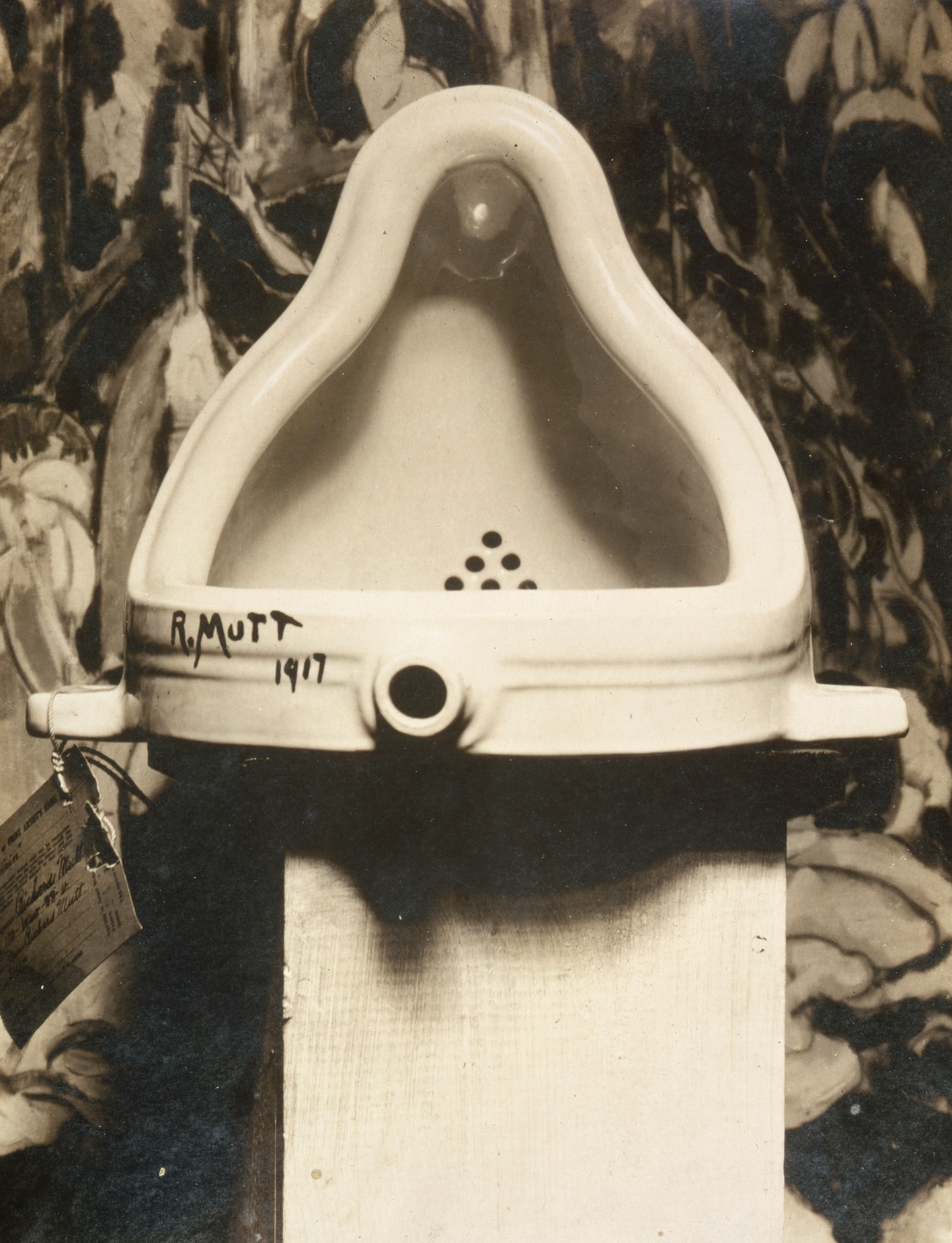
Marcel Duchamp, Fountain, 1917. Photograph by Alfred Stieglitz

(Note: Some art historians consider only the un-altered manufactured objects to be readymades. This list includes the pieces he altered or constructed.)

- Bottle Rack (also called Bottle Dryer or Hedgehog) (Egouttoir or Porte-bouteilles or Hérisson), 1914. A galvanized iron bottle drying rack that Duchamp bought in 1914 as an "already made" sculpture, but it gathered dust in the corner of his Paris studio because the idea of "readymade" had not yet been born. Two years later, through correspondence from New York with his sister, Suzanne Duchamp, in France he intended to make it a readymade by asking her to paint on it "(from) Marcel Duchamp". However, Suzanne, who was looking after his Paris studio, had already disposed of it.
- In Advance of the Broken Arm (En prévision du bras cassé), 1915. Snow shovel on which Duchamp carefully painted its title. The first piece the artist called a "readymade". New to America, Duchamp had never seen a snow shovel not manufactured in France. With fellow Frenchman Jean Crotti he purchased it from a stack of them, took it to their shared studio, painted the title and "from Marcel Duchamp 1915" on it, and hung it from a wire in the studio. It was eventually lost. Many years later, a replica of the piece is said to have been used to move snow off the sidewalks of Chicago.
- Pulled at 4 pins, 1915. An unpainted chimney ventilator that turns in the wind. The title is a literal translation of the French phrase, "tiré à quatre épingles", roughly equivalent to the English phrase "dressed to the nines". Duchamp liked that the literal translation meant nothing in English and had no relation to the object.
- Comb (Peigne), 1916. Steel dog grooming comb inscribed along the edge in white, "3 ou 4 gouttes de hauteur n'ont rien a faire avec la sauvagerie; M.D. Feb. 17 1916 11 a.m." ("Three or Four Drops of Height [or Haughtiness] Have Nothing to Do with Savagery.")
- Traveller's Folding Item (...pliant,... de voyage), 1916. Underwood Typewriter cover.
- Fountain, 1917. Porcelain urinal inscribed "R. Mutt 1917". The board of the 1917 Society of Independent Artists exhibit, of which Duchamp was a director, after much debate about whether Fountain was or was not art, hid the piece from view during the show. Duchamp quickly quit the society, and the publication of Blind Man, which followed the exhibition was devoted to the controversy. While still hiding his own participation in the piece, Duchamp indicated in a 1917 letter to his sister that a female friend was centrally involved in submitting this work. As he writes: "One of my female friends who had adopted the pseudonym Richard Mutt sent me a porcelain urinal as a sculpture." The friend, whose address on West 88th Street appears on the object's submission ticket, was Louise Norton (later Varèse), though others have erroneously claimed the friend was Baroness Elsa von Freytag-Loringhoven.
- Trap (Trébuchet), 1917. Modified coat rack on wood flooring. Duchamp submitted it to a show at the Bourgeois Art Gallery and asked that it be placed near the entryway. It went unnoticed as art during the show.
- Hat Rack (Porte-chapeaux), c. 1917. A wooden hatrack that Duchamp suspended from the ceiling of his studio.
- 50 cc of Paris Air (50 cc air de Paris, Paris Air or Air de Paris), 1919. A glass ampoule containing air from Paris. Duchamp took the ampoule to New York City in 1920 and gave it to Walter Arensberg as a gift. The original was broken and replaced in 1949 by Duchamp. (Contrary to its title, the volume of air inside the ampoule was not actually 50 cubic centimeters, although when replicas were made in later decades, 50 cm^{3} of air was used. The original ampoule is thought to have contained around 125 cm^{3} of air.)
- Fresh Widow, 1920.
- The Brawl at Austerlitz, 1921.

== Assisted readymades ==
- Bicycle Wheel (Roue de bicyclette), 1913. Bicycle wheel mounted by its fork on a painted wooden stool. He fashioned it to amuse himself by spinning it, "...like watching a fire... It was a pleasant gadget, pleasant for the movement it gave." It is considered the first readymade, even though he did not have the idea for readymades until two years later. The original from 1913 was lost, and Duchamp recreated the sculpture in 1951. Bicycle Wheel is also said to be the first kinetic sculpture.
- With Hidden Noise (A bruit secret), 1916. A ball of twine between two brass plates, joined by four screws. An unknown object has been placed in the ball of twine by one of Duchamp's friends.
- Unhappy readymade, 1919. Duchamp instructed his sister Suzanne to hang a geometry textbook from the balcony of her Paris apartment so that the problems and theorems, exposed to the test of the wind, sun and rain, could "get the facts of life." Suzanne carried out the instructions and painted a picture of the result.
- Belle Haleine, Eau de Voilette, 1921. A perfume bottle in the original box. An intriguing punning object, it was auctioned in 2009 for $11.5 million.
- Why Not Sneeze, Rose Sélavy?, 1921. Marble cubes in the shape of sugar lumps with a thermometer and cuttle bones in a small bird cage.

== Rectified readymades ==
Marcel Duchamp, 1919, L.H.O.O.Q., a parody of the Mona Lisa with a goatee and moustache

- Pharmacy (Pharmacie), 1914. Gouache on chromolithograph of a scene with bare trees and a winding stream to which he added two dots of watercolor, red and green, like the colored liquids in a pharmacy.
- Apolinère Enameled, 1916–1917. A Sapolin paint advertisement.
- L.H.O.O.Q., 1919. Pencil on a reproduction of Leonardo da Vinci's Mona Lisa on which he drew a goatee and moustache. The name, when pronounced in French, is a coarse pun—"elle a chaud au cul", translating colloquially as "she's got a hot ass" or "her ass is on fire".
- Wanted, $2,000 Reward, 1923. Photographic collage on poster.

== 1964 Galleria Schwarz edition ==
In 1964, Duchamp authorized a limited edition release of replicas of fourteen of his readymades, to be issued by his art dealer, Arturo Schwarz, through the Galleria Schwarz in Milan. The edition included eight sets for sale, two sets of artist's proofs (one for Duchamp and one for Schwarz), and two hors de commerce sets to be given to museums. Schwarz replicated the works with oversight from Duchamp, taking "almost fanatical care" in reproducing them accurately, according to Duchamp.

Critical reaction to Duchamp's decision to reproduce the readymades was generally negative. Artist Daniel Buren, for example, said that Duchamp had "sold out to commercialism". As decades passed, however, the Galleria Schwarz replicas "gradually became mainstreamed and eventually became stand-ins for the lost originals, sharing their status and value", according to Israel Museum curator Adina Kamien. Today, Schwarz's replicas are found in museums around the world.

Initial demand for the replicas was slow. One set was sold in 1969 to New York art dealer Arne Ekstrom, who then sold it to Indiana University Art Museum in 1971 for $35,000. Another set was sold in 1971 to the National Gallery of Canada. By 1974, much of the edition was still unsold, though Schwarz had raised the prices considerably; a complete set was listed for $450,000, and individual works started at $15,000. Schwarz sold his remaining inventory at auction in 1985, except for one remaining complete set, which he sold to the National Museum of Modern Art in Japan in 1987.

Duchamp's proof set was sold by his widow to the Musée National d'Art Moderne in Paris in 1986. Schwarz sold his proof set at auction in 2002. The two museum sets were donated to the Israel Museum in Jerusalem in 1972 and the National Gallery of Modern Art in Rome in 1997.

== Doubts over readymades ==
Research published in 1997 by Rhonda Roland Shearer questions whether Duchamp's found objects had been genuinely "found", or deliberately created or altered by the artist. Her research of items like snow shovels and bottle racks in use at the time failed to turn up any identical matches to photographs of the originals. However, there are accounts of Walter Arensberg and Joseph Stella being with Duchamp when he purchased the original Fountain at J. L. Mott Iron Works. Such investigations are hampered by the fact that few of the original "readymades" survive, having been lost or destroyed. Those that still exist are predominantly reproductions authorized or designed by Duchamp in the final two decades of his life. Shearer also asserts that the artwork L.H.O.O.Q. which is recorded to be a poster-copy of the Mona Lisa with a moustache drawn on it, is not the true Mona Lisa, but Duchamp's own slightly-different version that he modelled partly after himself. The inference of Shearer's viewpoint is that Duchamp was creating an even larger joke than he admitted.

== Bibliography ==
- Bailey, Bradley: "Before, During, and Beyond the Brillo Box: The Impact of Pop on the 1964 Edition of Duchamp's Readymades", Visual Resources, 34:3-4, pp. 347-363.
- Cabanne, Pierre: Dialogs with Marcel Duchamp, Da Capo Press, Inc., 1979 (1969 in French), ISBN 0-306-80303-8
- Gammel, Irene. Baroness Elsa: Gender, Dada and Everyday Modernity. Cambridge, MA: MIT Press, 2002, 224.
- Girst, Thomas: "(Ab)Using Marcel Duchamp: The Concept of the Readymade in Post-War and Contemporary American Art", toutfait.com, Issue 5, 2003
- Hulten, Pontus (editor): Marcel Duchamp: Work and Life, The MIT Press, 1993. ISBN 0-262-08225-X
- Kamien-Kazhdan, Adina: Remaking the Readymade: Duchamp, Man Ray, and the Conundrum of the Replica, Routledge, 2018. ISBN 978-1-4724-7816-0
- Tomkins, Calvin: Duchamp: A Biography. Henry Holt and Company, Inc., 1996. ISBN 0-8050-5789-7
- Judovitz, Dalia: Unpacking Duchamp: Art in Transit. University of California Press, 1998. ISBN 9780520213760
- Jean-Marc Rouvière: Au prisme du readymade, incises sur l'identité équivoque de l'objet préface de Philippe Sers et G. Litichevesky, Paris L'Harmattan 2023. ISBN 978-2-14-031710-1
- Toutfait: The Marcel Duchamp Studies Online Journal

== See also ==
- List of works by Marcel Duchamp
- Anti-art
- Maurizio Cattelan Another Fucking Readymade (1996)
