= Apolinère Enameled =

Painting by Marcel Duchamp

- Artist: Marcel Duchamp
- Year: 1916-17
- Medium: Gouache and graphite on painted tin, mounted on cardboard
- Dimensions: 24.4 cm × 34 cm (9.6 in × 13 in)
- Location: Philadelphia Museum of Art
- Accession: 1950-134-73

Apolinère Enameled was painted in 1916–17 by Marcel Duchamp, as a heavily altered version of an advertisement for paint ("Sapolin Enamel"). The picture depicts a girl painting a bed-frame with white enamelled paint. The depiction of the frame includes conflicting perspective lines that produce an impossible object already found in the original paint ad, where a part of the frame is missing. The piece is sometimes referred to as Duchamp's "impossible bed" painting.

Apolinère is a play-on-words referencing the poet, writer and art critic Guillaume Apollinaire, a close associate of Duchamp during the Cubist adventure. Apollinaire wrote about Duchamp (and others) in his book The Cubist Painters, Aesthetic Meditations of 1913.

== See also ==
- List of works by Marcel Duchamp
- Readymades of Marcel Duchamp
