= Walter Conrad Arensberg =

American art collector, critic and poet

Walter Conrad Arensberg (April 4, 1878 – January 29, 1954) was an American patron of art, collector, critic, and poet. His father was part owner and president of a crucible steel company. He majored in English and philosophy at Harvard University. Arensberg and his wife Louise (born as Mary Louise Stevens; 1879–1953) were supporters of many artistic initiatives.

== Early life and career ==
Walter Arensberg was born in Pittsburgh, Pennsylvania, the oldest child of Conrad Christian Arensberg and his second wife, Flora Belle Covert. Walter's father was president and partial owner of a successful Pittsburgh crucible steel company. Between 1896 and 1900, Walter attended Harvard University. Following graduation, he traveled to Europe, where he spent at least two years. In 1903, he returned to Harvard, as a graduate student. He did not complete his degree, but moved to New York City to work as a cub reporter from 1904-1906.

Arensberg's first major book, The Cryptography of Dante (1921) was greeted as a literary scandal because of its deeply Freudian interpretation of the text. A full-page review appeared in The New York Evening Journal with the title "A Shocking Attack on Dante's immortal 'Inferno'." This book was followed by The Cryptography of Shakespeare (1922), which finds acrostics and anagrams in the published works of Shakespeare that reveal the embedded name of Francis Bacon. In The secret grave of Francis Bacon and his mother in the Lichfield chapter house (1923) and The Shakespearean mystery (1928) he used a "key cipher" to find further messages connected with the Rosicrucians. Analysis by William Friedman and Elizebeth Friedman shows that none of the methods has cryptographic validity.

Several volumes of Arensberg's Symbolist-influenced verse were also published, including 1914's Poems and 1916's Idols. His poem Voyage a l'Infini was anthologized by Edmund Clarence Stedman. His far more adventurous, avant-garde poetry appeared in Dada magazines between 1917 and 1919: Rogue, The Blind Man, 391, TNT.

== Art patron and collector ==
Between 1913 and 1950, the couple collected the works of modern artists such as Jean Metzinger, Marcel Duchamp, Charles Sheeler, Walter Pach, and Beatrice Wood, as well as Pre-Columbian art. They were assisted by dealer Earl L. Stendahl. The Arensbergs became particularly close with Duchamp, who lived in their apartment during the summer of 1915 while they vacationed at their summer home in Pomfret, Connecticut. They would become the artist's lifelong patrons and form the largest, most significant collection of his work. When Duchamp's idea to dispatch his 1917 work Fountain, an ordinary bathroom urinal signed with the pseudonym "R. Mutt," to the first show of the Society of Independent Artists was rejected, both he and Arensberg felt obliged to resign from the society. The circle of friends and artists frequented the Arensberg Salon in Manhattan has been represented in a visual reconstruction Chez Arensbergs by the French painter André Raffray (1925-2010), created upon a commission by the New York art dealer and dada specialist Francis M. Naumann, who also actively participated in the creative process.

== California years ==
In 1921, for health and financial reasons and upon Louise's insistence, the couple relocated to Hollywood, California. While the move was originally intended to be temporary, the Arensbergs remained in California for the rest of their lives, returning to New York for only a year between 1925 and 1926. They first lived in Residence A, a guest house designed by Frank Lloyd Wright on Olive Hill, a property owned by Aline Barnsdall for a time. In September 1927, the Arensbergs purchased their permanent home on 7065 Hillside Avenue, an example of Mediterranean Revival architecture built in 1920 for Lee B. Memefee and designed by architect William Lee Woollett; they later commissioned architect Richard Neutra to build an addition to house Constantin Brâncuși's bronze version of L'Oiseau dans l'espace (1924). In 1946, Max Ernst and Dorothea Tanning were married at the home in a double wedding with Juliet Browner and Man Ray.

Arensberg served as a board member of the Los Angeles Art Association (1937), Los Angeles County Museum of Art (1938–1939), and the Southwest Museum (1944–1954). He was a founding board member of the short-lived American Arts in Action (1943) and the Modern Institute of Art, Beverly Hills (1947–1949), organizations dedicated to showing modern art in California.

== Francis Bacon Foundation ==
Intrigued with writer Francis Bacon, particularly the aspects of alchemy, cryptography, Rosicrucianism, and, inevitably, the Shakespeare-Bacon debate, the Arensbergs researched his work. In 1937, they established the Francis Bacon Foundation in Los Angeles intending to promote "research in history, philosophy, science, literature, and art, with special reference to the life and works of Francis Bacon" and in 1954 endowed it with funds and their collection of Baconiana. The Foundation's library was housed in its own small brick building at the Claremont Colleges beginning in 1960. In the intervening years, the collection grew from its original 3,500 volumes to over 16,000 volumes. With the failing health of the collection's longtime librarian and curator, Elizabeth Wrigley, the Foundation decided to transfer it to the Huntington Library in San Marino. The collection is now known as the Francis Bacon Foundation Arensberg Collection.

== Legacy ==
In the 1940s, the Arensbergs began to look for a permanent home for their collection. In 1941, a group around actors Vincent Price, Edward G. Robinson, Fanny Brice, and Sam Jaffe tried to get the collection to stay on the West Coast, for the Modern Institute of Art in Beverly Hills. In 1944, the Arensbergs signed a deed of gift with the University of California, Los Angeles, which included the stipulation that the University build an appropriate museum to house the collection in a specified time frame; their friend and fellow collector Galka Scheyer subsequently signed a similar agreement. By the fall of 1947 it was obvious that this condition would not be met and the contract was nullified. In 1939, the Los Angeles County Museum of Art's board turned down a gift of avant-garde works from the collection.

The Arensbergs then began negotiations with numerous other institutions, including the Art Institute of Chicago, the Denver Art Museum, Harvard University, the Honolulu Academy of Arts, the Instituto Nacional de Bellas Artes (Mexico, D.F.), the National Gallery, the Philadelphia Museum of Art, the San Francisco Museum of Art, Stanford University, the University of California, Berkeley, and the University of Minnesota. The Arensbergs eventually dropped their demand that the recipient of the collection also provide for the continuance of the Francis Bacon Foundation. After protracted discussions and many visits from director Fiske Kimball and his wife Marie, the Arensbergs presented their collection of over 1000 objects, including correspondence, ephemera, clippings, writings, personal and art collection records, and photographs documenting the couple's art collecting activities as well as their friendship with many important artists, writers and scholars, to the Philadelphia Museum of Art on December 27, 1950.

In 1949, Daniel Catton Rich and Katherine Kuh organized the first public exhibition of the Arensberg collection, held at the Art Institute of Chicago in 1949. For the exhibition Making Mischief: Dada Invades New York in 1996, the Whitney Museum of American Art partially recreated the interior of the Manhattan apartment of the Arensbergs.
