= The Penn Club of Philadelphia =

Coordinates: 39.94688°N 75.15412°W

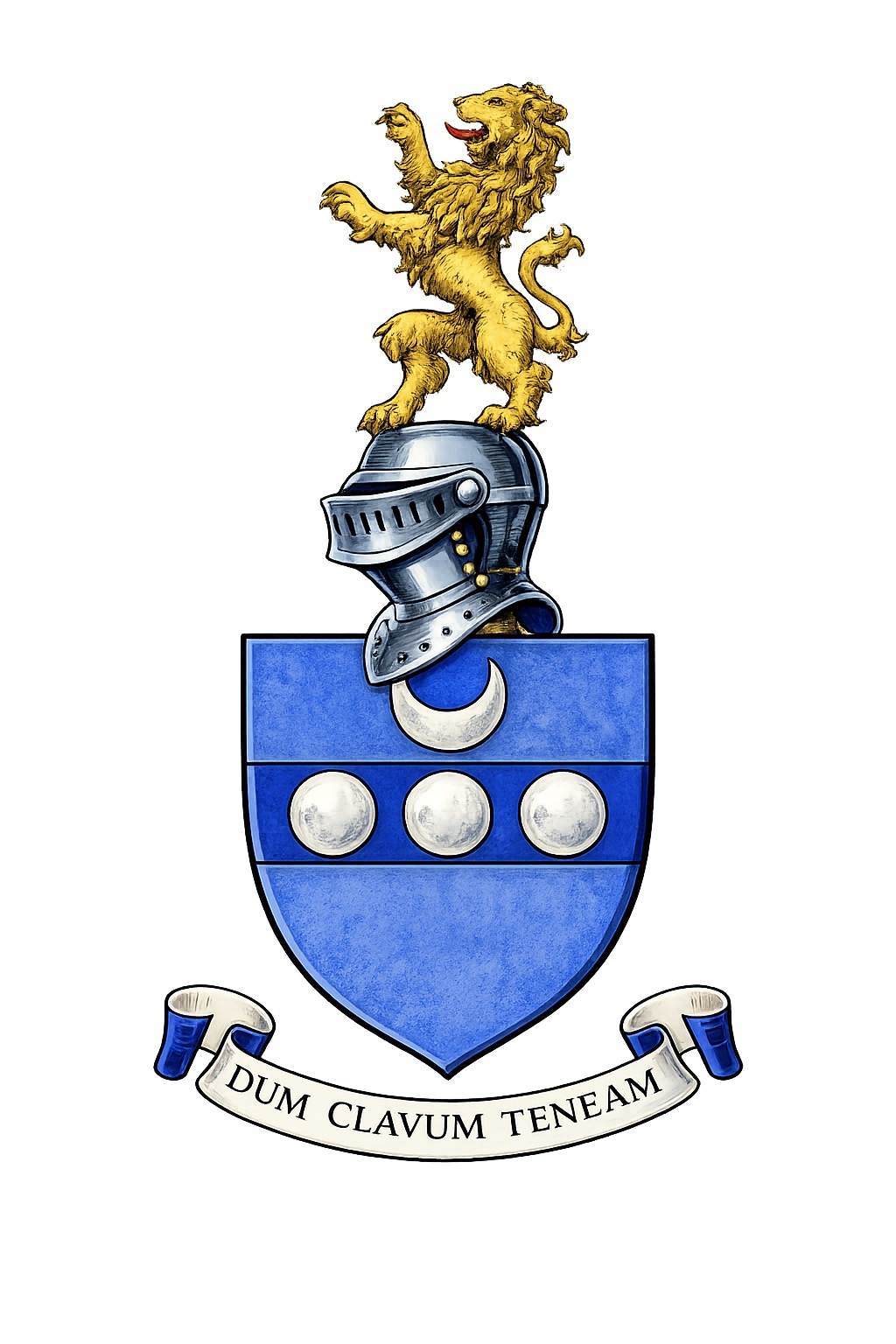
Arms of the Penn Club of Philadelphia

The Penn Club is a private social club in Philadelphia. It was organized on March 18, 1875, with a mission to heighten awareness of arts and culture at the time of the Centennial Exposition.

== History ==
With an original home on 8th and Locust streets in Philadelphia, the Club came to existence after the American Civil War and prior to the Centennial Exhibition. The organizers were among those whose characters had been formed during the period of the war and that of the reconstruction that followed. Morton McMichael, Jr. made the lease of 720 Locust Street with Horace Howard Furness. James P. Sims arranged the scheme of decoration and designed the mantel upon which McMichael and Wharton Barker placed the statue of William Penn, modeled in plaster by Muller. Henry Armitt Brown hung the picture said to represent William Penn. The membership was limited to 200.

The first president of the Club was Wharton Barker (1846–1921), who was a prominent abolitionist and president of the Philadelphia Stock Exchange. He was also one of the original fifty members who founded the Union Club, which later became the Union League of Philadelphia.

== Purpose ==
The intention of the Club is expressed in its charter:

The purposes for which the Corporation is formed are the association of authors, artists, men of science and the learned professions, and amateurs of music, letters, and the fine arts; and by receptions given to men or women distinguished in art, literature, science, or politics, and other kindred means, to promote social intercourse among its members.

The Penn Club meets in Center City, Philadelphia. The club is named for William Penn, and has no historical or current association with the University of Pennsylvania. The club's motto is: "Dum Clavum Teneam" (While I hold the helm), which is taken from the Penn family's coat of arms.

== Awardees ==
The Penn Club recognizes contributions to society with an award that consists of a bronze bust of William Penn. The bust was created by Beatrice Fenton, and the original is kept at the Historical Society of Pennsylvania. Past awardees include:

Edwin Booth on November 29, 1875
John F. Hartranft on May 16, 1876
President Ulysses S. Grant on May 13, 1877
Walt Whitman on March 27, 1880
William S. Pepper, M.D. on February 22, 1881
Tommaso Salvini on January 16, 1883
Sir Henry Irving on December 1, 1883
John Patrick Ryan, Archbishop of Philadelphia on January 8, 1885
Gen. Lew Wallace on March 24, 1887
D. Hayes Agnew on March 4, 1889
J. William White on May 31, 1889
Adm. Robert Peary on November 12, 1892
Rev. Edward Everett Hale on November 14, 1893
John Sartain on April 26, 1894
Sir H. Beerbohm Tree on March 21, 1895
S. Weir Mitchell on November 17, 1900
Samuel W. Pennypacker on May 2, 1903
Joseph Swain on May 20, 1904
Philander Knox on November 12, 1907
John Luther Long on April 22, 1908
Viscount Northcliffe on November 9, 1908
William W. Keen, M.D. on February 20, 1909
Violet Oakley, Cecilia Beaux and Sara Yorke Stevenson on April 17, 1909
Martin G. Brumbaugh on March 17, 1910
Agnes Repplier on April 27, 1911
Leopold Stokowski on December 17, 1912
Boies Penrose on January 31, 1914
J. Hampton Moore on March 4, 1920
Cardinal Dennis Joseph Dougherty on November 7, 1921
George Wharton Pepper and George S. Pepper, President of the American Academy of Music, on May 16, 1922
John Philip Sousa on December 1, 1922
Gifford Pinchot on December 2, 1922
Cyrus E. Woods on December 22, 1923
W. Freeland Kendrick on March 19, 1924
Charles Curtis Harrison, Provost of The University of Pennsylvania on April 20, 1925
William W. Atterbury on October 31, 1925
John S. Fisher on December 3, 1927
John Ashurst III, Librarian of the Free Library of Philadelphia on February 28, 1928
Hon. Edwin Owen Lewis, Founder of the Independence National Historic Park on November 23, 1928
Joseph E. Widener on January 19, 1931
Thomas Sovereign Gates on April 20, 1931
William Wister Comfort on May 11, 1931
Cyrus H. K. Curtis on December 18, 1931
Adm. Arthur Japy Hepburn on November 17, 1933
Frederic A. Delano on February 26, 1934
Daniel C. Roper on February 28, 1935
Harold Willis Dodds on March 6, 1936
Samuel S. Fleischer on January 14, 1937
Eugene Ormandy on February 25, 1938
Prince Bertil of Sweden on May 13, 1940
1st Earl of Halifax on October 23, 1944
Juan Antonio Rios on October 19, 1945
John Jay McLoy on May 14, 1948
Harold Stassen on January 14, 1949
Vijaya Lakshmi Pandit on April 29, 1950
Gaylord Harnwell on October 24, 1953
John Marshall Butler on November 19, 1954
William McChesney Martin, Jr. on January 20, 1956
Gen. Omar Bradley on October 30, 1959
Hon. William Warren Scranton on October 25, 1963
Andrew Wyeth on October 6, 1964
Robert Orville Anderson on November 18, 1969
Shelby Callum Davis on January 13, 1971
Earl Mountbatten of Burma and Dr. Harold Glendon Scheie on October 11, 1972
Rudolf Serkin on October 31, 1974
F. Otto Haas, President of Rohm and Haas on October 29, 1975
James Michener on November 1, 1976
James W. Symington on April 18, 2000
Peter Lawson Johnston, President of the John Simon Guggenheim Memorial Foundation on November 16, 2000
Anne d’Harnoncourt on October 23, 2001
Lord Roberts of Belgravia on April 18, 2002
Paul A. Volcker on October 20, 2003
Ernesta D. Ballard on October 21, 2004
Hon. William Webster on April 21, 2005
Constantine Papakakis on November 16, 2005
Joaquin Jackson on April 22, 2006
Charles Blockson on April 26, 2007
John Bolton on April 24, 2008
Joseph J. Rishel on April 22, 2009
Vince Papale on December 4, 2012
Dom Duarte Pio on April 18, 2013
Gen. John Keane on April 24, 2014
The Vidocq Society on October 28, 2014
Hon. John Lehman on April 30, 2015
G. Andrew Meschter on May 3, 2016
Thomas Ridge on October 17, 2018
Edward Gene Rendell on November 10, 2021
Robert P. George on November 21, 2022
Patrick J. Toomey, Jr. on November 28, 2023
Ketch Secor on April 22, 2025
Theodore Schick on March 24, 2026
Simon Jones on November 13, 2026

== See also ==
- List of traditional gentlemen's clubs in the United States
