= Jean Sutherland Boggs =

Canadian academic (1922–2014)

- Boggs in 1963
- Born: Grace Jean Sutherland Boggs; June 11, 1922; Negritos, Peru
- Died: August 22, 2014 (aged 92); Ottawa, Ontario, Canada
- Education: Trinity College, Toronto; Radcliffe College
- Occupations: Academic, art historian, and civil servant
- Employers: Washington University in St. Louis; National Gallery of Canada; Harvard University; Philadelphia Museum of Art

Jean Sutherland Boggs CC FRSC D. Litt. LL. D. (June 11, 1922 – August 22, 2014) was a Canadian academic, art historian and civil servant. She was the first female Director of both the National Gallery of Canada and the Philadelphia Museum of Art. She was also a specialist in the work of Edgar Degas and Picasso.

== Early life ==
Grace Jean Sutherland Boggs was born in Negritos, Peru, on June 11, 1922, to Oliver Desmond and Humia Marguerite (née Sutherland). Boggs attended Alma College in St. Thomas, Ontario, graduating in 1938. Boggs would later receive a Bachelor of Arts degree from the Trinity College, Toronto in 1942. She received a M.A. in 1946 and a Ph.D. in 1953 from Radcliffe College.

From 1942 to 1944, she was an education secretary for the Art Association of Montreal (today known as the Montreal Museum of Fine Arts). In 1948, she joined the faculty of Skidmore College as an assistant professor. From 1949 to 1952, she was an assistant professor at Mount Holyoke College. From 1954 to 1962, she was an assistant and associate professor at the University of California. In 1962, she was appointed curator for the Art Gallery of Toronto. In 1964, she was appointed Steinberg Professor of Art History in Arts and Sciences at Washington University in St. Louis.

== Work ==
In 1966, Boggs was appointed the first woman and fifth director of the National Gallery of Canada and served in this position until 1976. During her tenure, the Gallery collection grew by more than 8,600 pieces, including works from Degas, van Gogh, Pollock, the Group of Seven, and the beginnings of the Gallery's photography collection. From 1976 to 1979, she was a Professor of Fine Arts at Harvard University.

From 1978 to 1982, she was the director of the Philadelphia Museum of Art. She succeeded Evan Turner, who had left following a dispute with the Board of Trustees. Under her leadership, the Museum purchased Edgar Degas's painting After the Bath, which is now considered to be one of the Museum's most important acquisitions in the post-war period. She also presided over the Museum during art historian Stella Kramrisch's acclaimed 1981 exhibition of Indian art, Manifestations of Shiva.

She was chair and chief executive officer of the Canada Museums Construction Corporation from 1982 to 1985, where she directed the construction of both a custom-built National Gallery building and the unique Canadian Museum of Civilization (today known as the Canadian Museum of History) in collaboration with the architects Moshe Safdie and Douglas Cardinal. From 1991 to 1993, she was a senior advisor for the Andrew W. Mellon Foundation. As an art historian, she has written books about the life of Edgar Degas, including Portraits By Degas (1962).

Boggs died on August 22, 2014, at the age of 92 in Ottawa, Ontario.

== Honours ==
In 1973, Boggs was made an Officer of the Order of Canada "in recognition of her scholarship and the vision and energy she has displayed in developing the collection and the services of the Gallery". She was promoted to Companion in 1992. In 1979 she was awarded an honorary Doctor of Literature from the University of Saskatchewan. She was awarded honorary degrees from Mount Holyoke College in 1971, York University in 1976 and from Concordia University in 2000.

== See also ==
- List of Directors of the Philadelphia Museum of Art

Cultural offices
Preceded by Evan Hopkins Turner	Director of the Philadelphia Museum of Art; 1979–1982	Succeeded by Anne d'Harnoncourt
