= Joseph Rishel =

American curator (1940–2020)

Joseph J. Rishel (May 15, 1940 – November 5, 2020) was a curator at the Philadelphia Museum of Art and a specialist in the art of Paul Cézanne. He retired in May 2016 and was a curator emeritus of European Painting.

He was married to Anne d'Harnoncourt, Director of the Philadelphia Museum of Art, until her death in 2008.

Rishel was a fellow of the American Academy of Arts and Sciences, a member of the American Philosophical Society, and a chevalier of the Ordre des Arts et des Lettres.

== Selected publications ==
- Cézanne in Philadelphia collections. Philadelphia Museum of Art, Philadelphia, 1983. ISBN 978-0812211573
- Gauguin, Cézanne, Matisse: Visions of Arcadia. Philadelphia Museum of Art, Philadelphia, 2012. (Contributor and editor) ISBN 978-0300179804
