= Timothy Rub =

American art historian

Timothy F. Rub (born 1952) is an American museum director and art historian. He previously held the position of the George D. Widener Director and Chief Executive Officer at the Philadelphia Museum of Art, one of the largest museums in the United States.

== Early life and education ==
Rub was born in 1952 in New York, N.Y. He was raised largely in New Jersey and in 1974 received a bachelor's degree in art history from Middlebury College in Vermont. He received his master's degree in Art History from the New York University Institute of Fine Arts. He also received a degree in business administration from Yale University.

== Career ==
After Yale, Rub was named a Ford Foundation Fellow and was the curator at the Cooper-Hewitt Museum from 1983 to 1987. From 1991 to 1999, he was the director of the Hood Museum of Art at Dartmouth College in New Hampshire. He was director of the Cincinnati Art Museum from 2000 until, in 2006, he was selected to head the Cleveland Museum of Art. While at Cleveland, he was responsible for the reinstallation of European and American art collections, and oversaw its capital project and fundraising campaign. Under his tenure, the museum completed the first phase of a seven-year $350 million renovation and expansion designed by the architect Rafael Viñoly. He also developed a touring exhibitions program that sent exhibitions from the museum to Beijing, Tokyo, Seoul, Munich, and a number of venues in North America, and was responsible for a number of new acquisitions, including a 10th-century Chola temple sculpture of the Hindu god Shiva.

Rub was mentioned as a finalist for the same position at the Metropolitan Museum of Art in 2008, but took himself out of the running. On June 18, 2009, the Philadelphia Museum of Art voted unanimously to appoint him as the director, after reviewing the seventy-five applicants. Rub was chosen to replace Anne d'Harnoncourt, who died of cardiac arrest June 1, 2008, after leading the museum for twenty-six years.

During his tenure, Rub executed plans for a ten-year $500 million expansion and renovation, designed by Frank Gehry. In 2021, the museum announced that Rub would step down as director and chief executive in January 2022.

== Personal life ==
Rub specializes in architecture and modern art, and considers his passion to be early 20th Century modern art. He is married to artist and graphic designer Sally Rub, with whom he has two children, Katharine and Peter. They live in Philadelphia, Pennsylvania.

== Publications ==
The Age of the Marvelous
Goddess and Polis: The Panathenaic Festival in Ancient Athens
Jose Clemente Orozco in the United States, 1928-1934
Petra: Lost City of Stone

== See also ==
- List of Directors of the Philadelphia Museum of Art
