= Philadelphia Museum of Art =

Art museum in Pennsylvania, United States

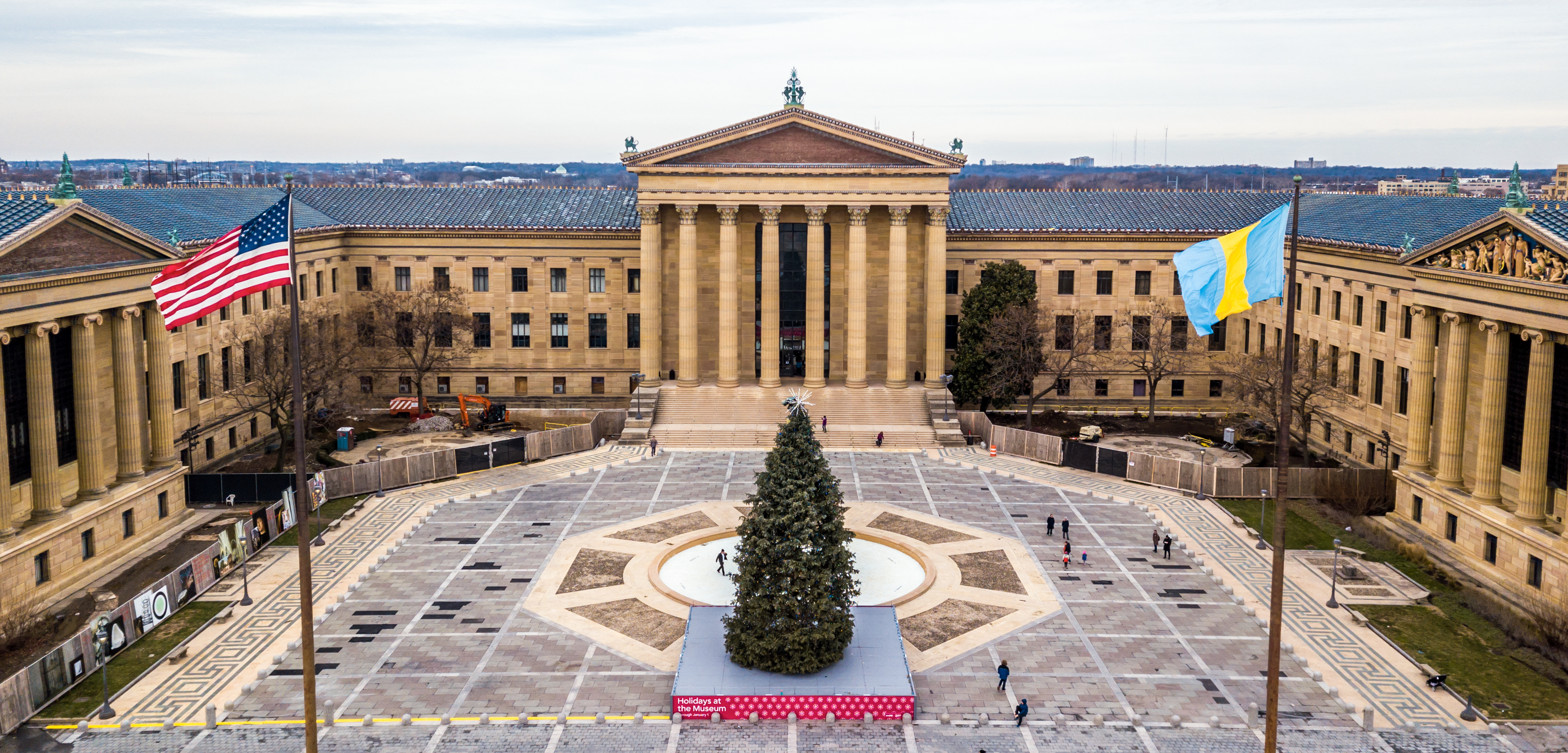
- Philadelphia Museum of Art's main building at Eakins Oval in 2017
- Interactive fullscreen map
- Former name: Pennsylvania Museum and School of Industrial Art (1876–1964); Philadelphia Art Museum (2025–2026)
- Established: February 1876; 150 years ago
- Location: 2600 Benjamin Franklin Parkway, Philadelphia, Pennsylvania, U.S.
- Coordinates: 39.966°N 75.181°W
- Type: Art museum
- Collection size: 240,000
- Visitors: 793,000 (2017)
- Director: Daniel H. Weiss
- Chairperson: Ellen T. Caplan
- Architects: Horace Trumbauer; Zantzinger, Borie and Medary; Howell Lewis Shay; Julian Abele
- Public transit access: SEPTA bus: 38, 43; Philly PHLASH, Suburban Station
- Website: www.philamuseum.org

Philadelphia Register of Historic Places

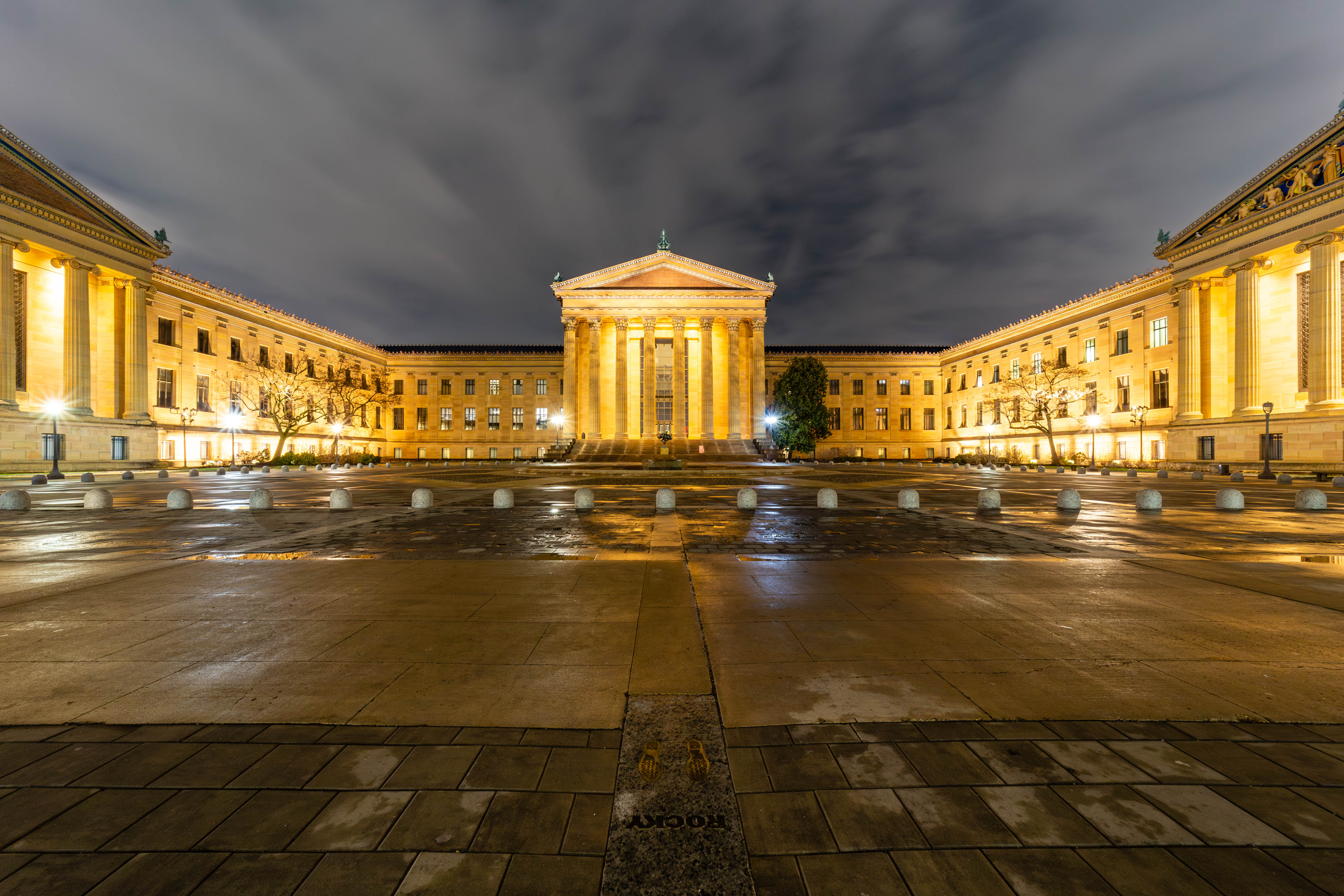
Main building seen at night

The Philadelphia Museum of Art is an art museum originally chartered in 1876 for the Centennial Exposition in Philadelphia. The main museum building was completed in 1928 on Fairmount, a hill located at the northwest end of the Benjamin Franklin Parkway at Eakins Oval. The museum administers collections containing over 240,000 objects including major holdings of European, American and Asian origin. The artwork includes sculpture, paintings, prints, drawings, photographs, armor, and decorative arts.

The Philadelphia Museum of Art administers several annexes including the Rodin Museum, also located on the Benjamin Franklin Parkway, and the Ruth and Raymond G. Perelman Building, which is across the street just north of the main building. The Perelman Building, which opened in 2007, houses more than 150,000 prints, drawings and photographs, 30,000 costume and textile pieces, and over 1,000 modern and contemporary design objects including furniture, ceramics, and glasswork.

The museum also administers the historic colonial-era houses of Mount Pleasant and Cedar Grove, both located in Fairmount Park. The main museum building and its annexes are owned by the City of Philadelphia and administered by a registered nonprofit corporation.

Several special exhibitions are held every year, including touring exhibitions in cooperation with other museums in the United States and abroad. The museum had 437,348 visitors in 2021. The current director is Daniel H. Weiss.

== History ==
=== Early years (1877–1900) ===
Philadelphia celebrated the 100th anniversary of the Declaration of Independence with the Centennial Exposition in 1876. Memorial Hall, which contained the art gallery, was intended to outlast the Exposition and house a permanent museum. Following the example of London's South Kensington Museum, the new museum was to focus on applied art and science, and provide a school to train craftsmen in drawing, painting, modeling, and designing.

The Pennsylvania Museum and School of Industrial Art opened on May 10, 1877. The school began to operate independently in 1964 and eventually became part of the University of the Arts. The museum collection began with objects from the Exposition and gifts from the public. The first donations were European and Japanese art and art books for the museum library. However, the location outside of Center City, Philadelphia, was hard to reach. a The museum charged admission until 1962.

In 1882, Clara Jessup Moore donated her collection of antique furniture, enamels, carved ivory, jewelry, metalwork, glass, ceramics, books, textiles and paintings. The Countess de Brazza's lace collection was acquired in 1894 forming the nucleus of the lace collection. In 1892 Anna H. Wilstach bequeathed a large painting collection, including many American paintings, and an endowment of half a million dollars for additional purchases. Works by James Abbott McNeill Whistler and George Inness were purchased within a few years and Henry Ossawa Tanner's The Annunciation was bought in 1899.

=== Construction of the main building (1895–1933) ===
Video of the main building and the Fairmount Water Works

The City Council of Philadelphia funded a competition in 1895 to design a new museum building, but it was not until 1907 that plans were first made to construct it on Fairmount, a rocky hill topped by the city's main reservoir. The Fairmount Parkway (renamed Benjamin Franklin Parkway), a grand boulevard that cut diagonally across the grid of city streets, was designed to terminate at the foot of the hill. But there were conflicting views about whether to erect a single museum building, or a number of buildings to house individual collections.

Horace Trumbauer and Zantzinger, Borie and Medary, both architectural firms, collaborated for more than a decade to resolve these issues. The final design is mostly credited to two architects in Trumbauer's firm: Howell Lewis Shay for the building's plan and massing, and Julian Abele for the detail work and perspective drawings. In 1902, Abele had become the first African-American student to be graduated from the University of Pennsylvania's Department of Architecture, which is presently known as Penn's School of Design. Abele adapted classical Greek temple columns for the design of the museum entrances, and was responsible for the colors of both the building stone and the figures added to one of the pediments.

Construction of the main building began in 1919, when Mayor Thomas B. Smith laid the cornerstone in a Masonic ceremony. Because of shortages caused by World War I and other delays, the new building was not completed until 1928. The building was constructed with dolomite quarried in Minnesota. The wings were intentionally built first, to help assure the continued funding for the completion of the design. Once the building's exterior was completed, twenty second-floor galleries containing English and American art opened to the public on March 26, 1928, though a large amount of interior work was incomplete.

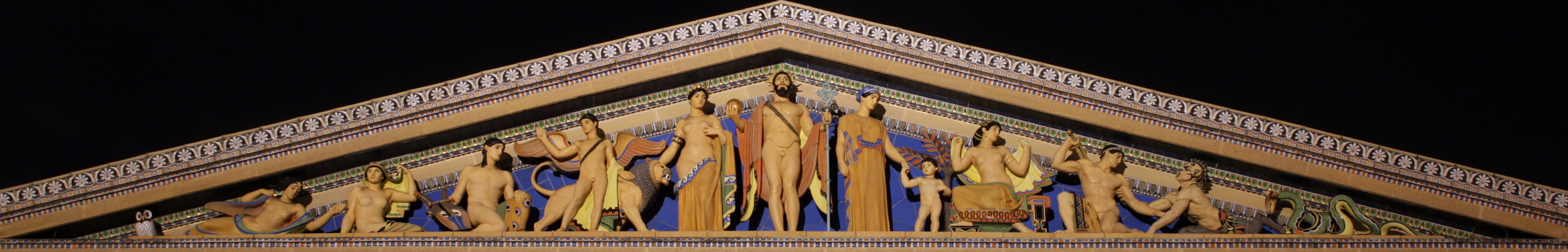
Pediment with polychrome sculpture by Jennewein and Solon on the north wing, at the east entrance

The building's eight pediments were intended to be adorned with sculpture groups. The only pediment that has been completed, Western Civilization (1933) by C. Paul Jennewein, colored by Leon V. Solon, features polychrome sculptures of painted terra-cotta figures depicting Greek deities and mythological figures. The sculpture group was awarded the Medal of Honor of the Architectural League of New York.

The building is also adorned by a collection of bronze griffins, which were later adopted as the symbol of the museum in the 1970s.

=== Membership program and growth (1928–1976) ===
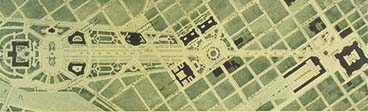
Fairmount Parkway plan, developed in 1917

In the early 1900s, the museum launched an education program for the general public, as well as a membership program. Fiske Kimball was the museum director during the rapid growth of the mid- to late-1920s, which included one million visitors in 1928—the new building's first year. The museum enlarged its print collection in 1928 with about 5,000 Old Master prints and drawings through the gift of Charles M. Lea, including French, German, Italian, and Netherlandish engravings. Major exhibitions of the 1930s included works by Eakins, Manet, Renoir, Cézanne, van Gogh, and Degas.

In the 1940s, major gifts and acquisitions included the collections of John D. McIlhenny (Oriental carpets), George Grey Barnard (sculpture), and Alfred Stieglitz (photography).

Early modern art dominated the growth of the collections in the 1950s, with acquisitions of the Louise and Walter Arensberg and the A.E. Gallatin collections. Grace Kelly's wedding dress is perhaps the best known gift of the 1950s.

Extensive renovation of the building lasted from the 1960s through 1976. Major acquisitions included the Carroll S. Tyson Jr. and Samuel S. White III and Vera White collections, 71 objects from designer Elsa Schiaparelli, and Marcel Duchamp's Étant donnés. In 1976 there were celebrations and special exhibitions for the centennial of the museum and the bicentennial of the nation. Major acquisitions in the second half of the 20th century included After the Bath by Edgar Degas and Fifty Days at Iliam by Cy Twombly.

=== Building expansion (2004–present) ===
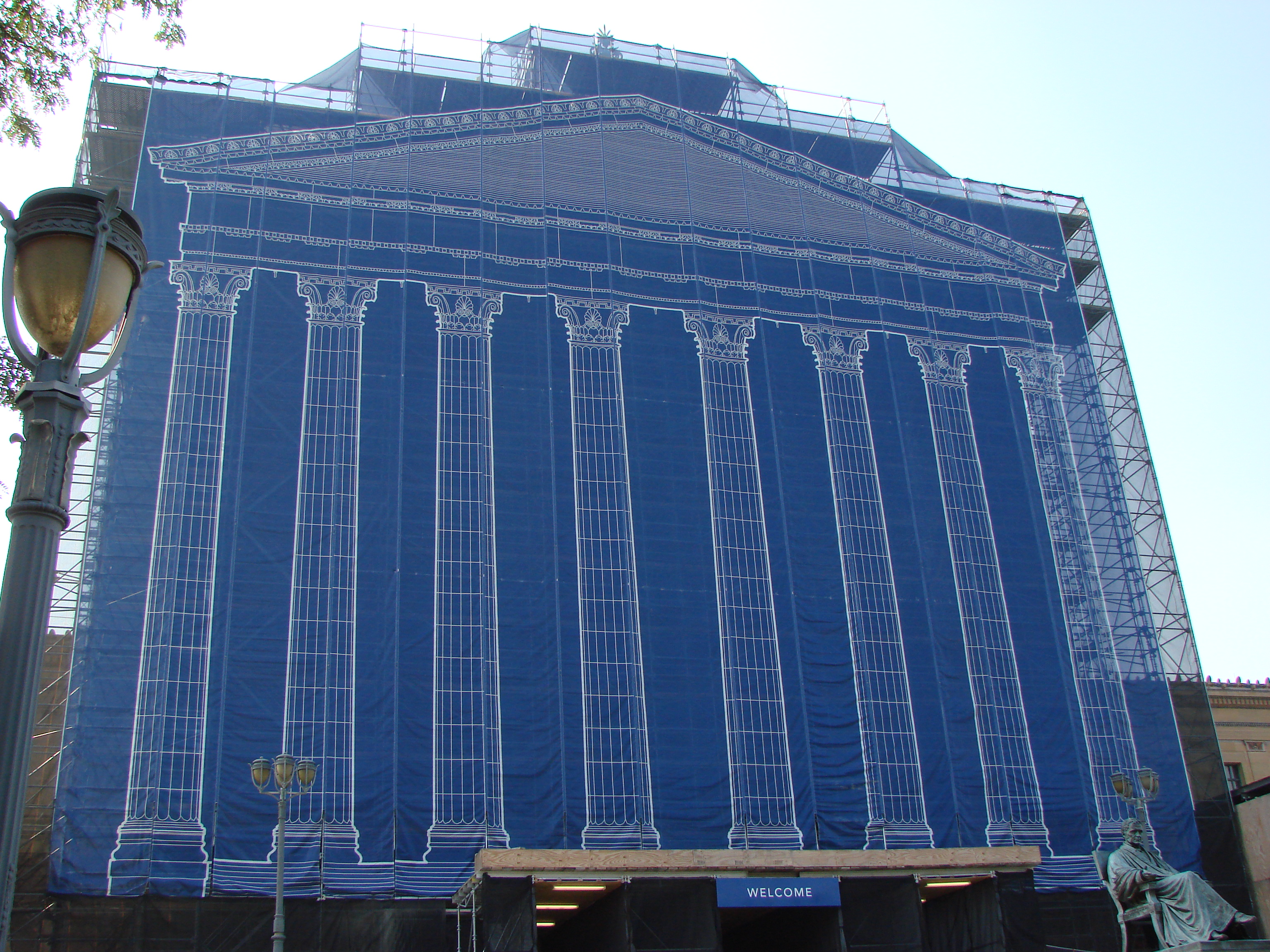
The west entrance during construction in 2008

In October 2006, the museum announced that Frank Gehry would design a building expansion. The 80,000-square-foot (7,400 m^{2}) gallery was to be entirely underground behind the east entrance stairs, without altering the existing Greek revival facade. The construction was projected to last a decade and cost $500 million. It would increase the museum's available display space by sixty percent and house mostly contemporary sculpture, Asian art, and special exhibitions.

Uncertainty was cast on the plans by the 2008 death of Anne d'Harnoncourt, but the new director, Timothy Rub, who had initiated a $350 million expansion at the Cleveland Museum of Art, carried out the plans as scheduled. In 2010, Gehry attended the groundbreaking for the second phase of the expansion, scheduled for completion in 2012. In that phase, a new art handling facility was created on the south side of the building, enabling the museum to reclaim a street level entrance, closed since the mid-1970s, which leads to a 640-foot (200 m)-long vaulted walkway that extends across the museum and is original to the 1928 building. The north entrance was reopened to the public as a part of the "core project." The core project also focused on the interior of the current building and added 90,000 square feet (8,400 m^{2}) of public space, including 11,500 square feet (1,070 m^{2}) of new gallery space for American art and contemporary art. In addition, a new space called the forum was created, along with dining and retail spaces. Said Gehry: "When it's done, people coming to this museum will have an experience that's as big as Bilbao. It won't be apparent from the outside, but it will knock their socks off inside."

The most controversial part of the Gehry design was a proposed window and amphitheater cut into the east entrance stairs. Others criticized the design as too tame. The Gehry expansion is projected to be completed by 2028.

In March 2017, the museum announced a $525 million campaign. The core project was budgeted at $196 million. By the end of the month, the museum announced that more than 62 percent of the campaign goal had been met.

In March 2020, the museum was temporarily closed due to COVID-19 pandemic. All public events and programs were canceled until August 31, 2020. The museum reopened in late September 2020.

In December 2021, the heirs of Piet Mondrian filed a lawsuit against the museum for Composition with Blue, which the artist had consigned to Küppers-Lissitzky when it was seized by the Nazis. The same year, the museum announced that it would return to the Czech Republic an ancient 'Pageant Shield' looted by Nazis .

In October 2025, the museum rebranded as the "Philadelphia Art Museum" after more than a year of planning. The museum underwent the rebranding to make it more modern and appealing to younger audiences, since the museum was colloquially known at the time as the Philadelphia Art Museum. The legal name of the museum remained the Philadelphia Museum of Art, and several museum affiliates did not change their names. In February 2026, the previous name of "Philadelphia Museum of Art" was restored.

In November 2025, museum director Sasha Suda was dismissed from her role. She later filed a lawsuit against the museum alleging breach of contract and wrongful termination.

== Collections ==
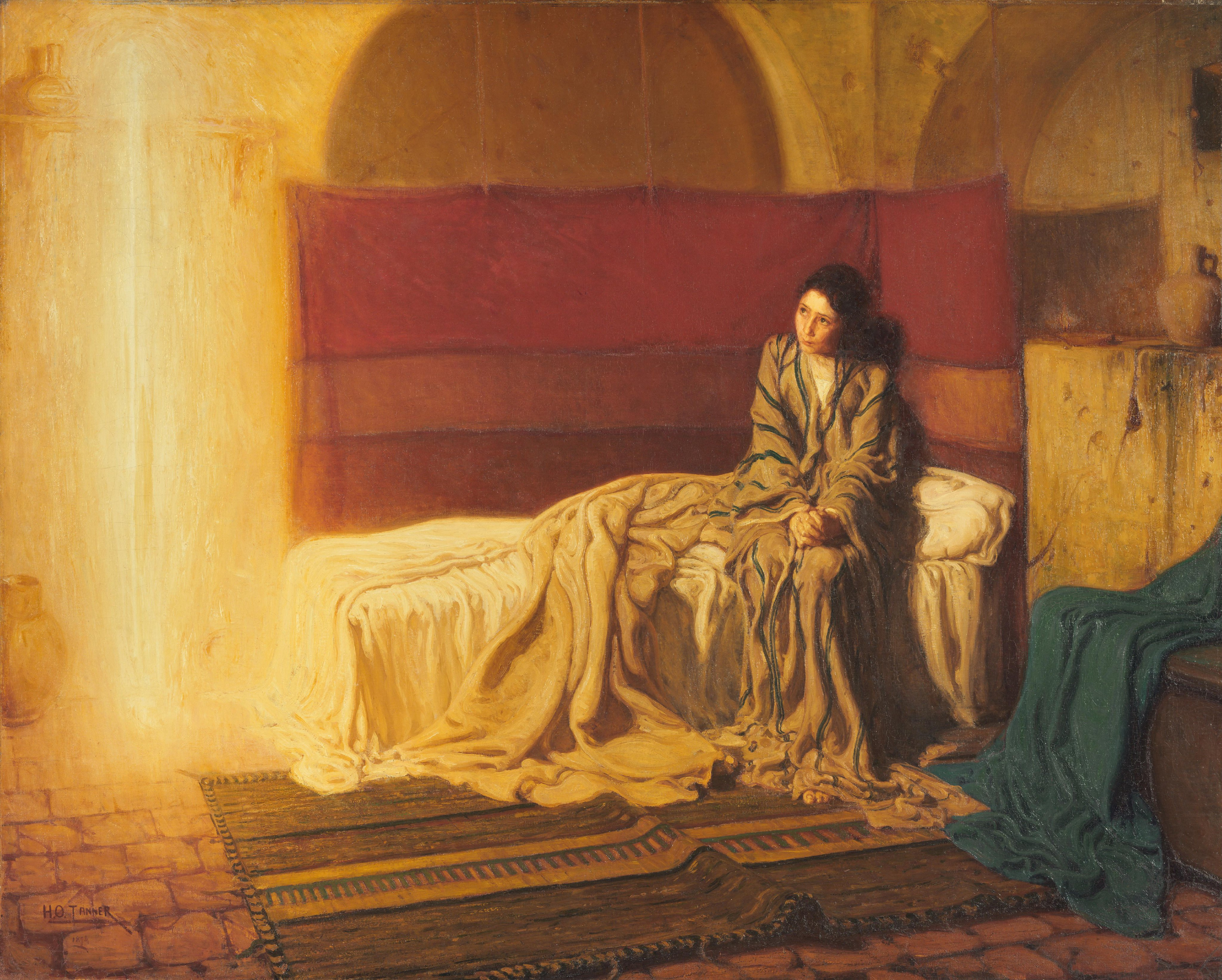
Henry Ossawa Tanner's The Annunciation, acquired in 1899

Picasso's, Three Musicians from 1921 on display at the museum

The Philadelphia Museum of Art houses more than 240,000 objects, highlighting the creative achievements of the Western world and those of Asia, in more than 200 galleries spanning 2,000 years. The museum's collections of Egyptian and Roman art, and Pre-Columbian works, were relocated to the Penn Museum after an exchange agreement was made whereby the museum houses the university's collection of Chinese porcelain.

Highlights of the Asian collections include paintings and sculpture from China, Japan, and India; furniture and decorative arts, including major collections of Chinese, Japanese, and Korean ceramics; a large and distinguished group of Persian and Turkish carpets; and rare and authentic architectural assemblages such as a Chinese palace hall, a Japanese teahouse, and a 16th-century Indian temple hall.

The European collections, dating from the medieval era to the present, encompass Italian and Flemish early-Renaissance masterworks; strong representations of later European paintings, including French Impressionism and Post-Impressionism; sculpture, with a special concentration in the works of Auguste Rodin; decorative arts; tapestries; furniture; the second-largest collection of arms and armor in the United States; and period rooms and architectural settings ranging from the facade of a medieval church in Burgundy to a superbly decorated English drawing room by Robert Adam.

The museum's American collections, surveying more than three centuries of painting, sculpture, and decorative arts, are among the finest in the United States, with outstanding strengths in 18th- and 19th-century Philadelphia furniture and silver, Pennsylvania German art, rural Pennsylvania furniture and ceramics, and the paintings of Thomas Eakins. The museum houses the most important Eakins collection in the world.

Modern artwork includes works by Pablo Picasso, Jean Metzinger, Antonio Rotta, Albert Gleizes, Marcel Duchamp, Salvador Dalí and Constantin Brâncuși, as well as American modernists. The expanding collection of contemporary art includes major works by Agnes Martin, Cy Twombly, Jasper Johns, and Sol LeWitt, among many others.

The museum houses encyclopedic holdings of costume and textiles, as well as prints, drawings, and photographs that are displayed in rotation for reasons of preservation.

=== The Carl Otto Kretzschmar von Kienbusch Collection ===
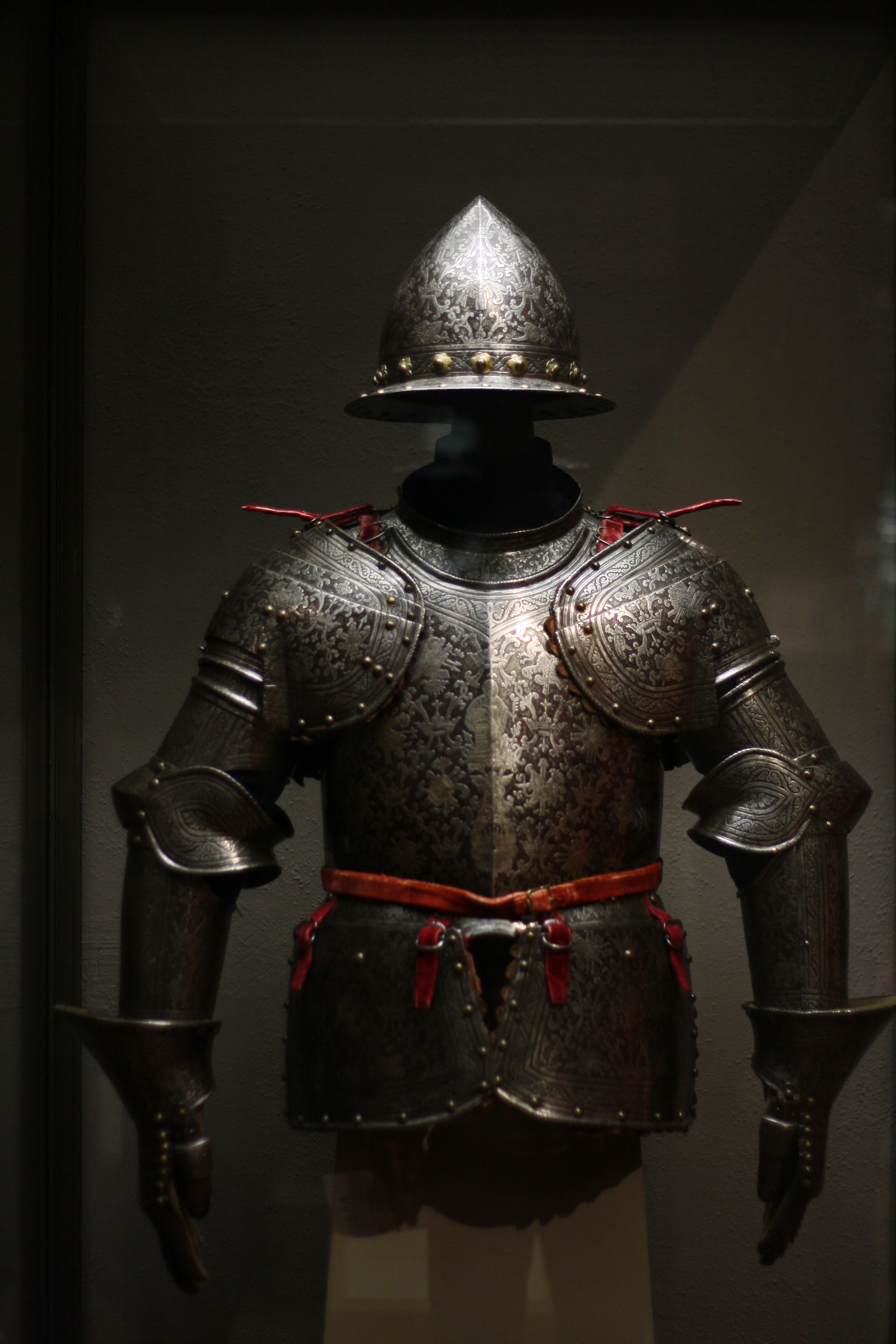
Armor from c. 1600 Milan, Italy

The museum also houses the armor collection of Carl Otto Kretzschmar von Kienbusch. The Von Kienbusch collection was bequeathed by the celebrated collector to the museum in 1976, the Bicentennial Anniversary of the American Revolution. The Von Kienbusch holdings are comprehensive and include European and Southwest Asian arms and armor spanning several centuries.

On May 30, 2000, the museum and the State Art Collections in Dresden, Germany (Staatliche Kunstsammlungen Dresden), announced an agreement for the return of five pieces of armor stolen from Dresden during World War II. In 1953, Von Kienbusch had unsuspectingly purchased the armor, which was part of his 1976 bequest. Von Kienbusch published catalogs of his collection, which eventually led Dresden authorities to bring the matter up with the museum.

== Special exhibitions ==
The Philadelphia Museum of Art organizes several special exhibitions each year. Special exhibitions have featured Salvador Dalí in 2005, Paul Cézanne in 2009, Auguste Renoir in 2010, Vincent van Gogh in 2012, Pablo Picasso in 2014, John James Audubon and Andy Warhol (et al.) in 2016, Winslow Homer and John Singer Sargent in 2017, and the Duchamp siblings—Marcel, Gaston, Raymond and Suzanne—in 2019. A Jasper Johns exhibition was planned for 2021.

In 2009, the museum organized Bruce Nauman: Topological Gardens, the official United States entry at the 53rd International Art Exhibition, more commonly known as the Venice Biennale, for which the artist Bruce Nauman was awarded the Golden Lion.

In April of 2026, the Philadelphia Museum of Art and The Pennsylvania Academy of Fine Arts presented a historic joint exhibition in celebration of the nation's 250th anniversary. The exhibition, A Nation of Artists, unites three extraordinary collections of American Art from both museums and the private Middleton Family Collection. The exhibition is on view at the Philadelphia Museum of Art from April 2026 through July 5, 2027, and at the Pennsylvania Academy of Fine Arts from April 2026 through September 2027.

== Administration ==
=== Directors ===
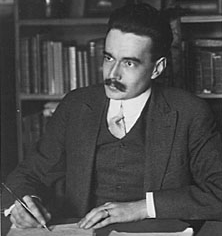
Fiske Kimball, the museum's director from 1925 to 1955

The directors of the museum since its inception are:

- Daniel H. Weiss, 2025–Present
- Sasha Suda, 2022–2025
- Timothy Rub, 2009–2022
- Anne d'Harnoncourt, 1982–2008
- Jean Sutherland Boggs, 1978–1982
- Evan Hopkins Turner, 1964–1977
- Arnold H. Jolles, 1977–1979 (acting)
- Henri Gabriel Marceau, 1955–1964
- Fiske Kimball, 1925–1955
- Sr. Samuel W. Woodhouse, 1923–1925 (acting)
- Langdon Warner, 1917–1923
- Edwin Atlee Barber, 1907–1916
- William Platt Pepper, 1899–1907
- Dalton Dorr, 1892–1899
- William W. Justice, 1879–1880
- William Platt Pepper, 1877–1879

=== Board of trustees ===
Below is the list of chairs of the board of trustees of the museum since 1991.

- Ellen T. Caplan, 2023 – present
- Leslie A. Miller, 2016 – 2023
- Constance H. Williams, 2010–2016
- Gerry Lenfest, 2001–2009
- Raymond Perlman, 1991–2001

== Gallery ==
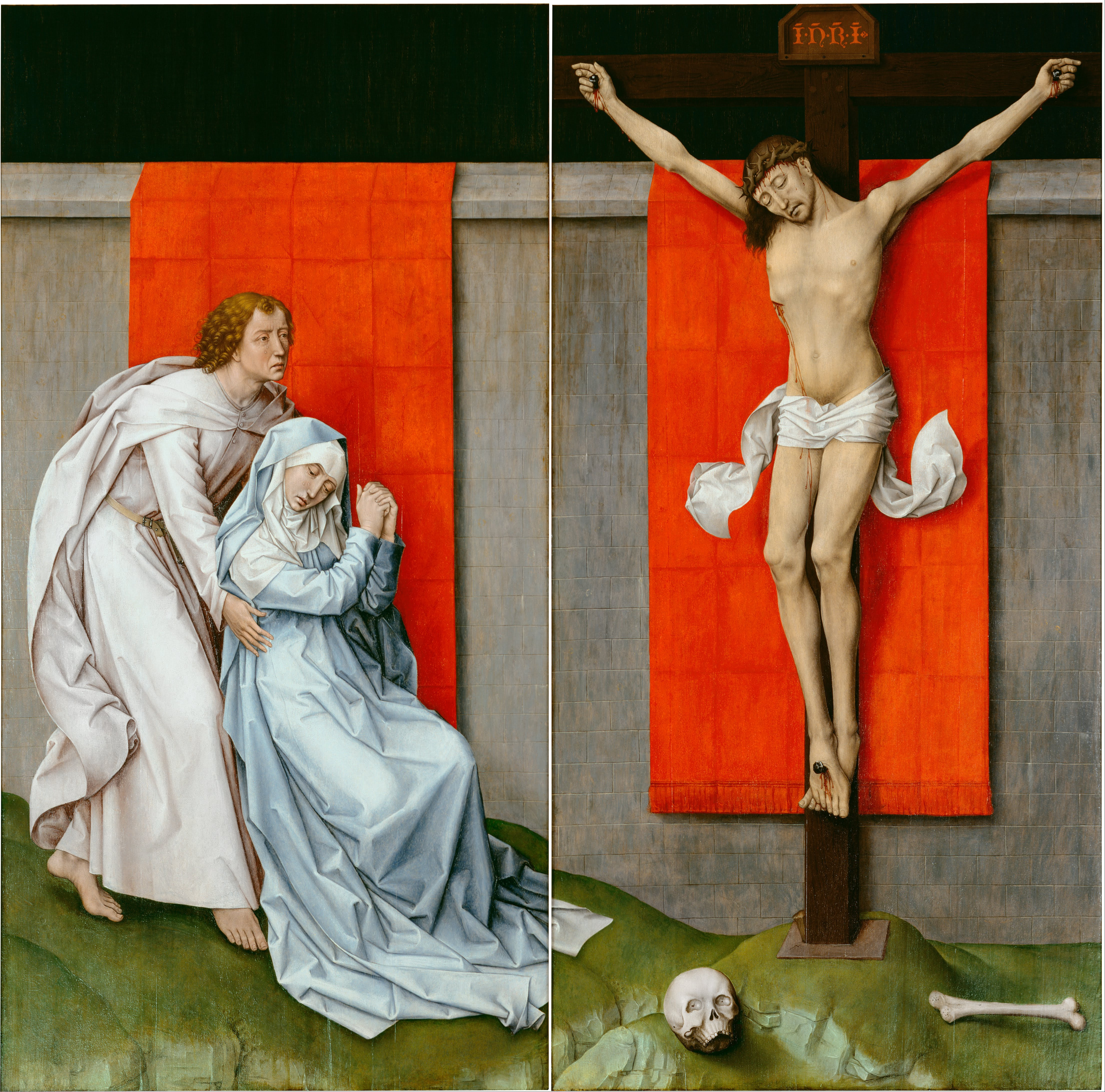
Rogier van der Weyden, Crucifixion Diptych, c. 1460

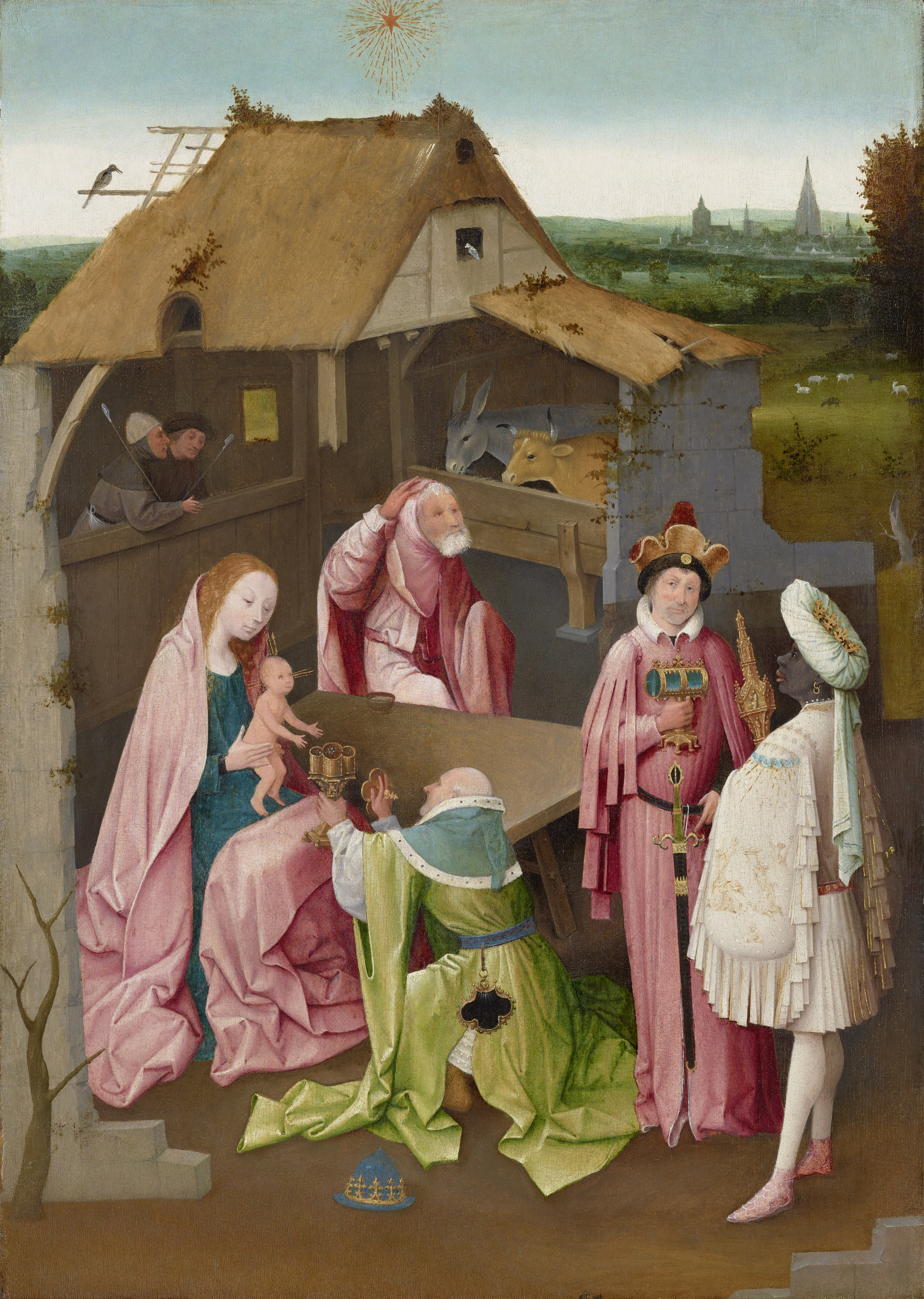
Hieronymus Bosch, Epiphany, c. 1475–1480

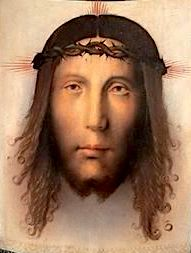
Bernardino Zaganelli, Cloth of Saint Veronica, c. 1500

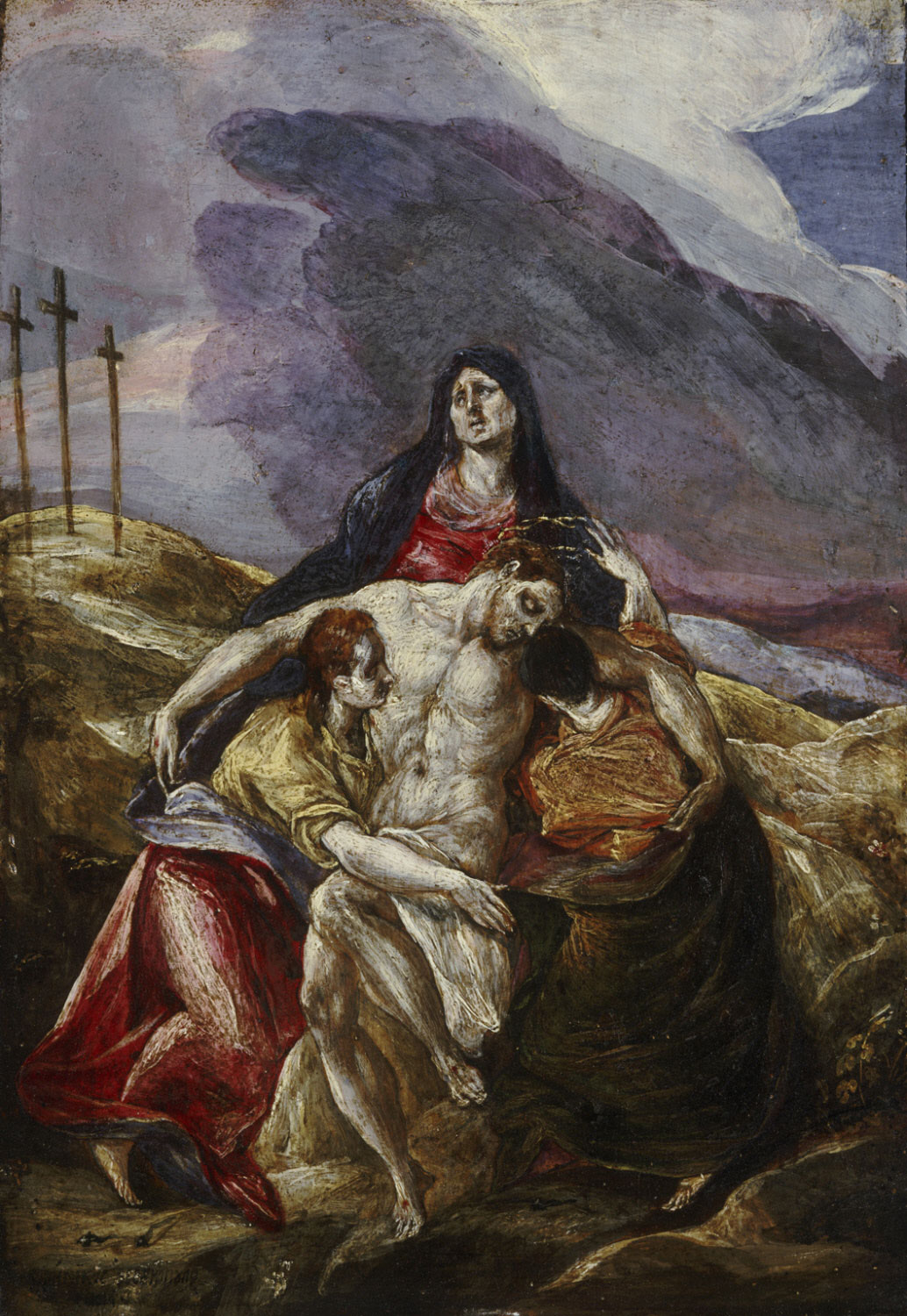
El Greco, Pietà, 1571–1576

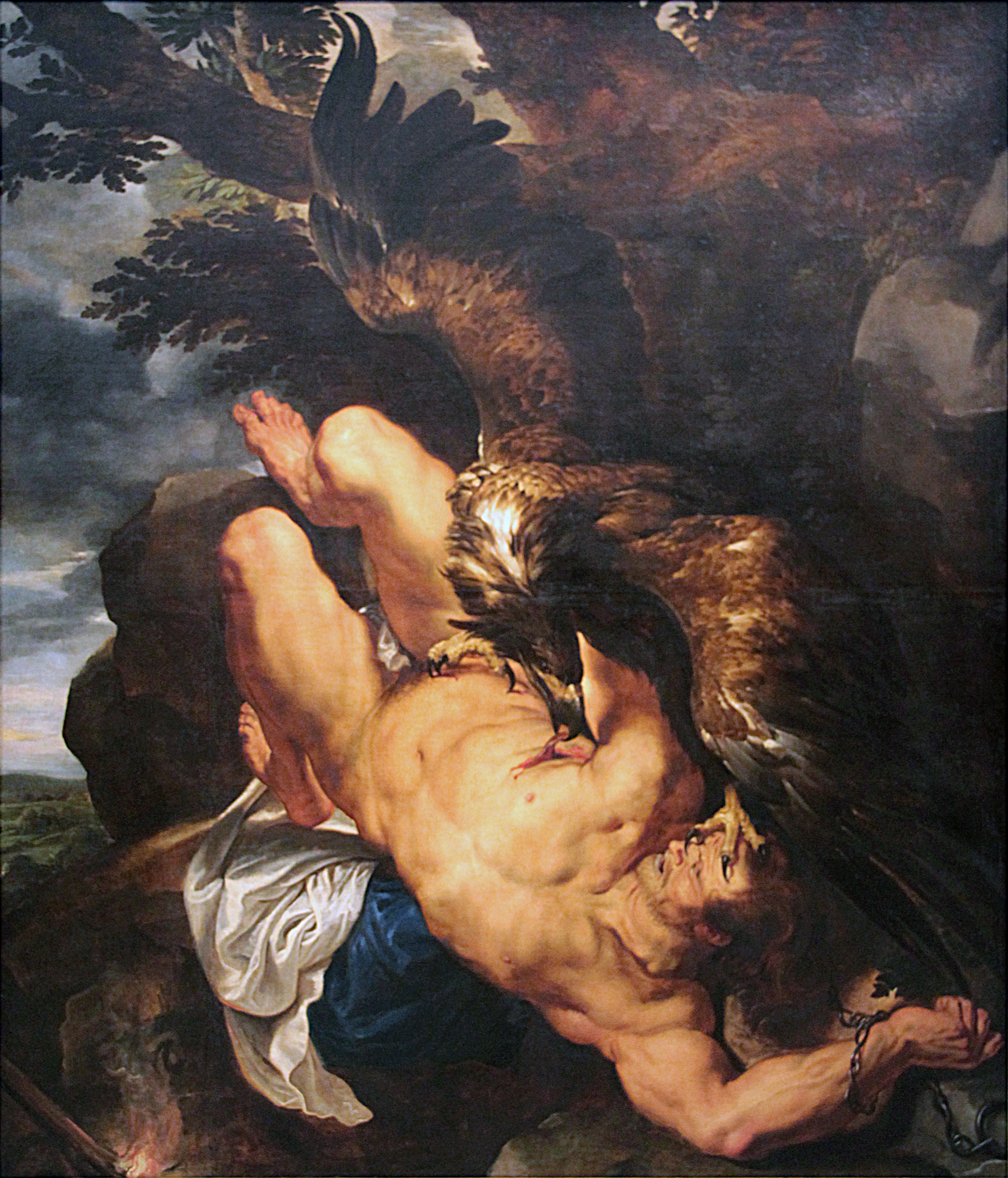
Peter Paul Rubens, Prometheus Bound, 1611–12

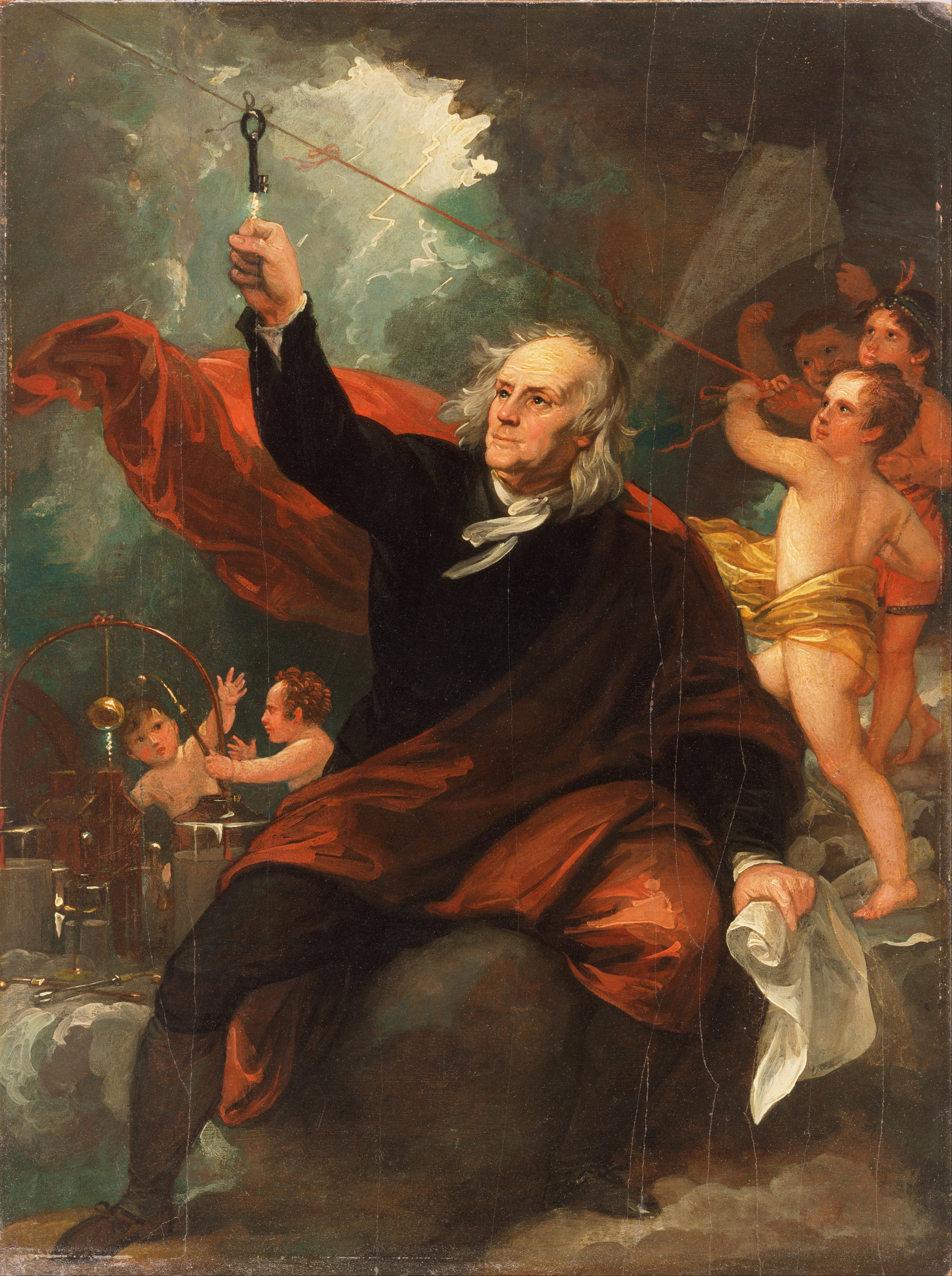
Benjamin Franklin Drawing Electricity from the Sky, by Benjamin West, c. 1816

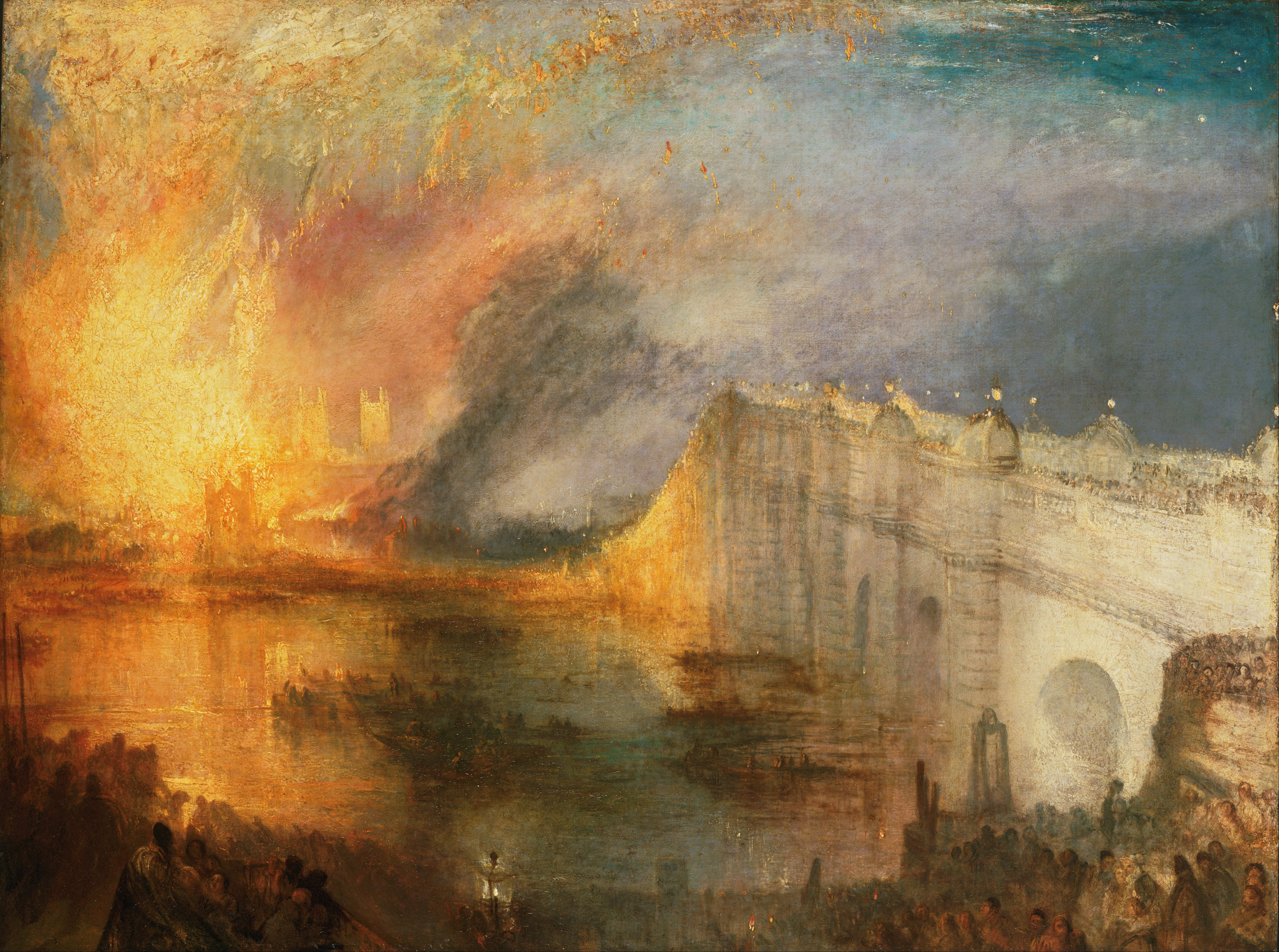
J. M. W. Turner, The Burning of the Houses of Lords and Commons, October 16, 1834, 1834–35

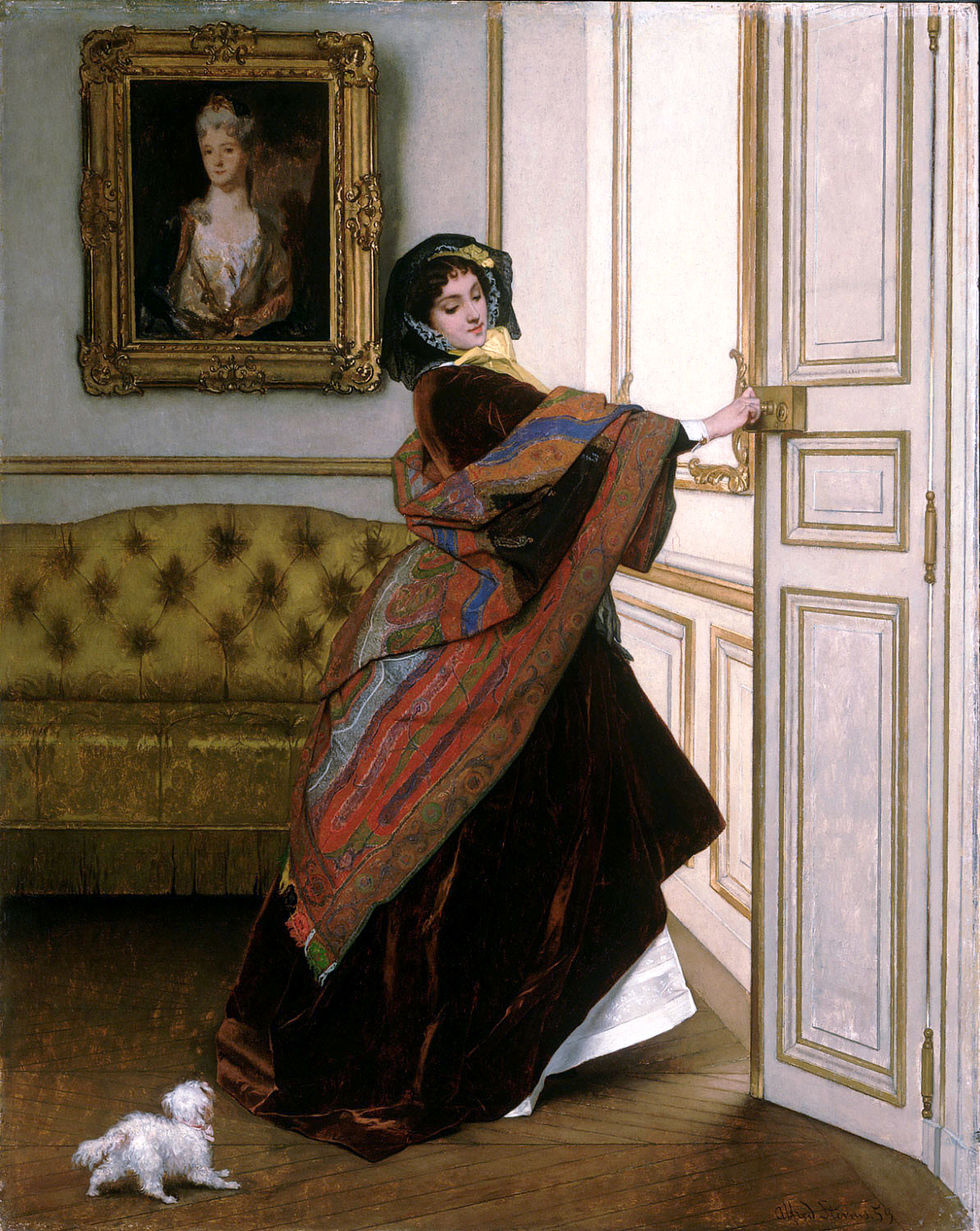
Alfred Stevens, Will you go out with me, Fido?, 1859

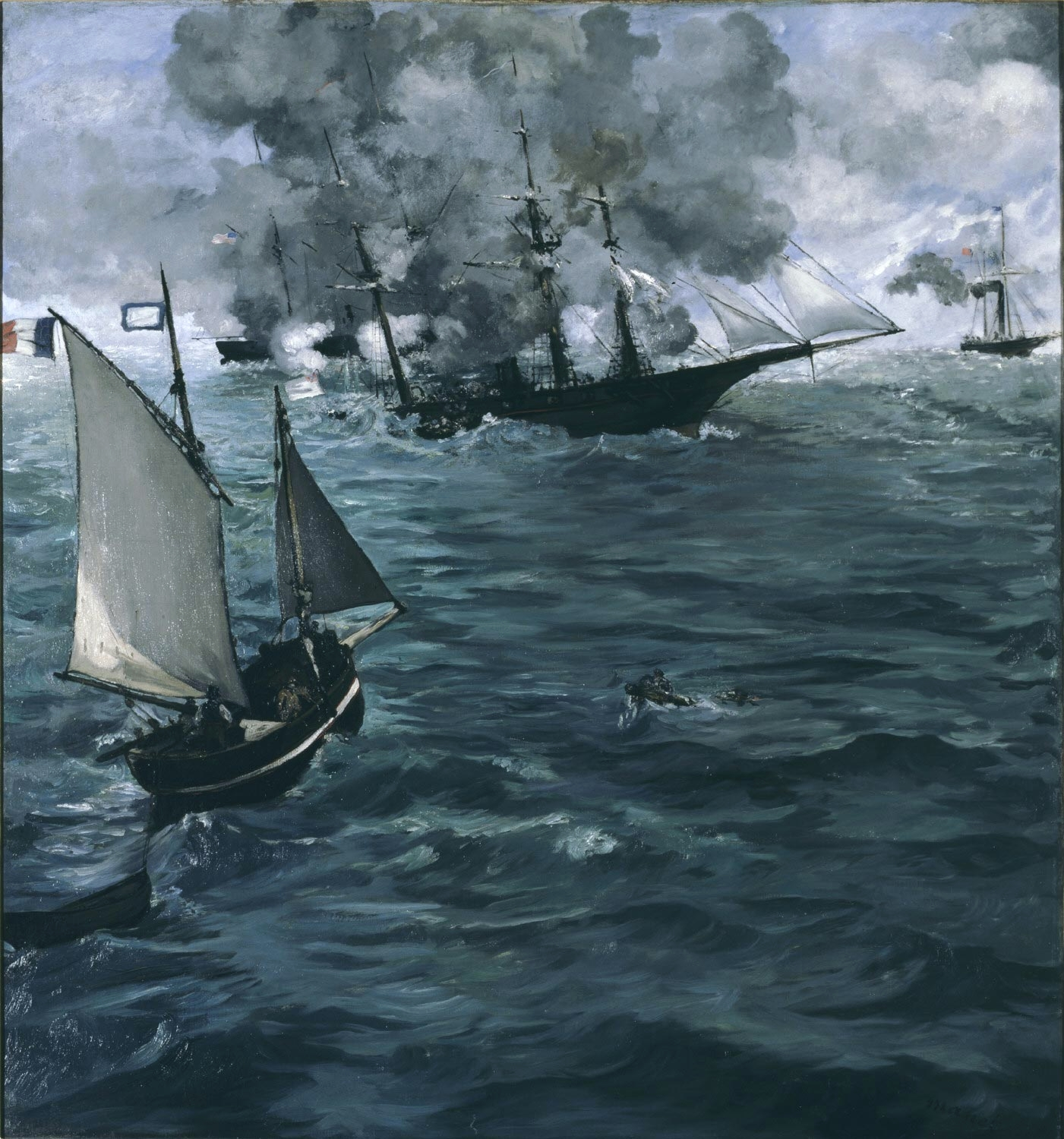
Édouard Manet, The Battle of The Alabama and Kearsarge, 1864

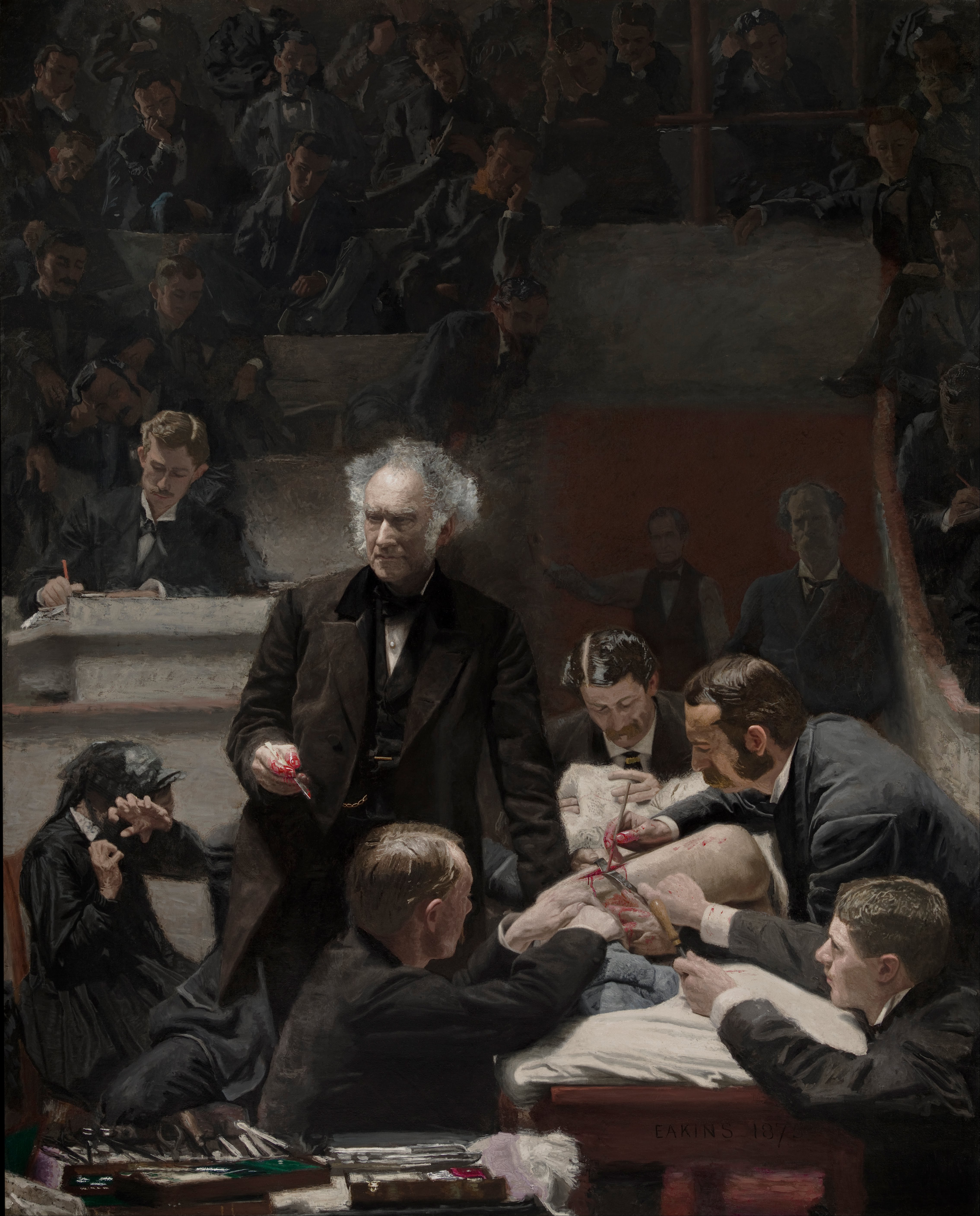
Thomas Eakins, The Gross Clinic, 1875

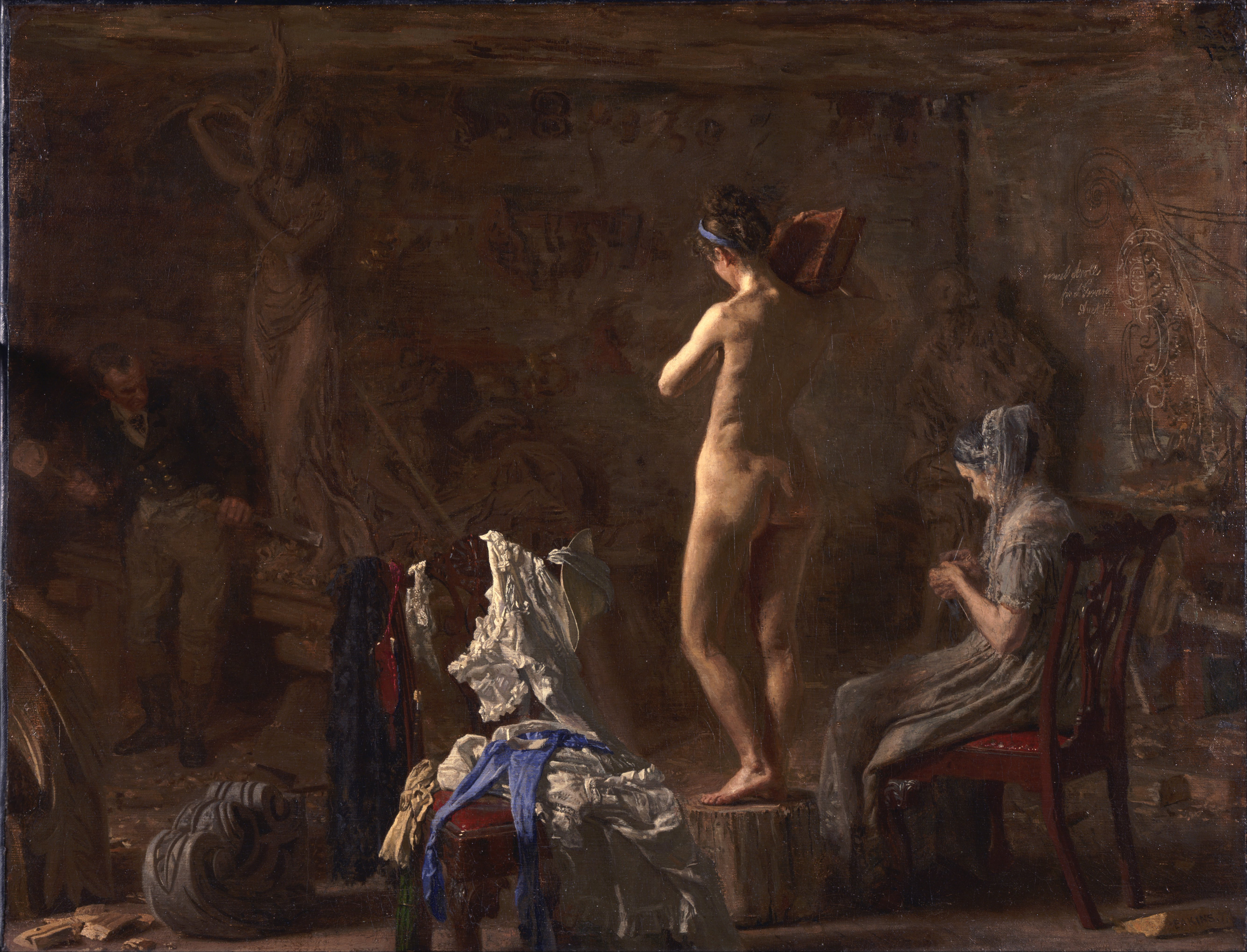
Thomas Eakins, William Rush Carving his Allegorical Figure of Schuylkill River, 1876–1877

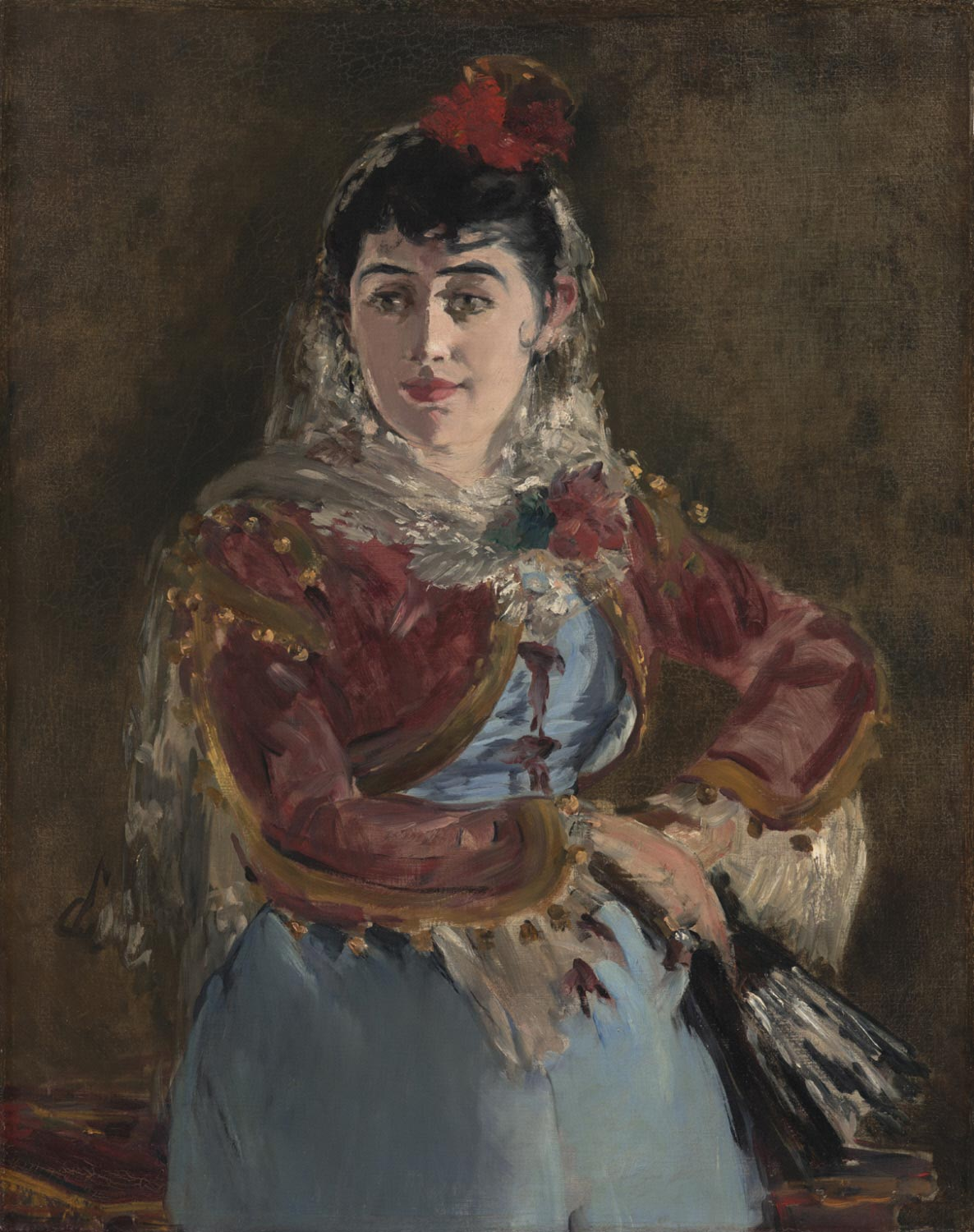
Édouard Manet, Portrait of Émilie Ambre as Carmen, 1880

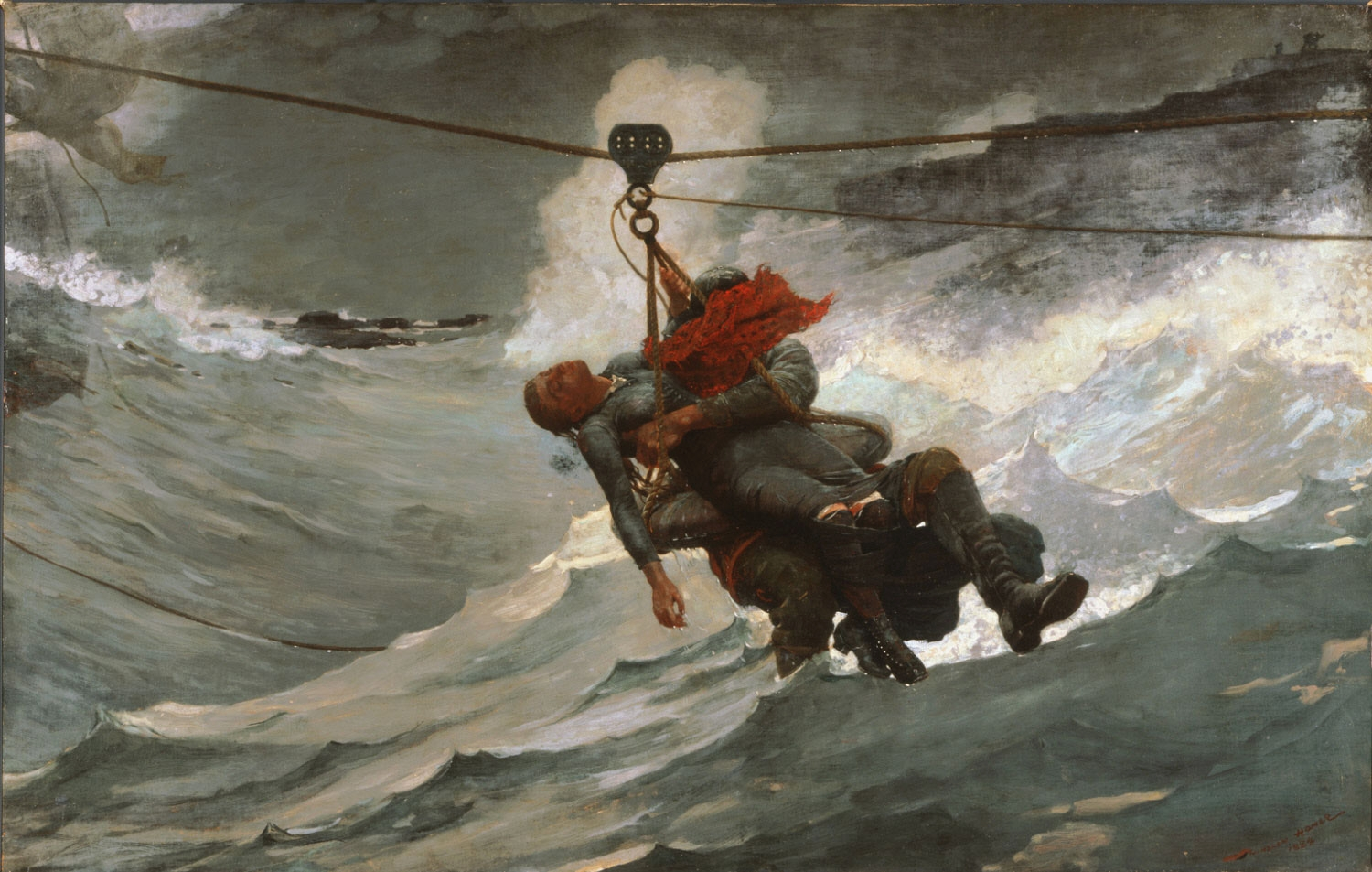
Winslow Homer, The Life Line, 1884

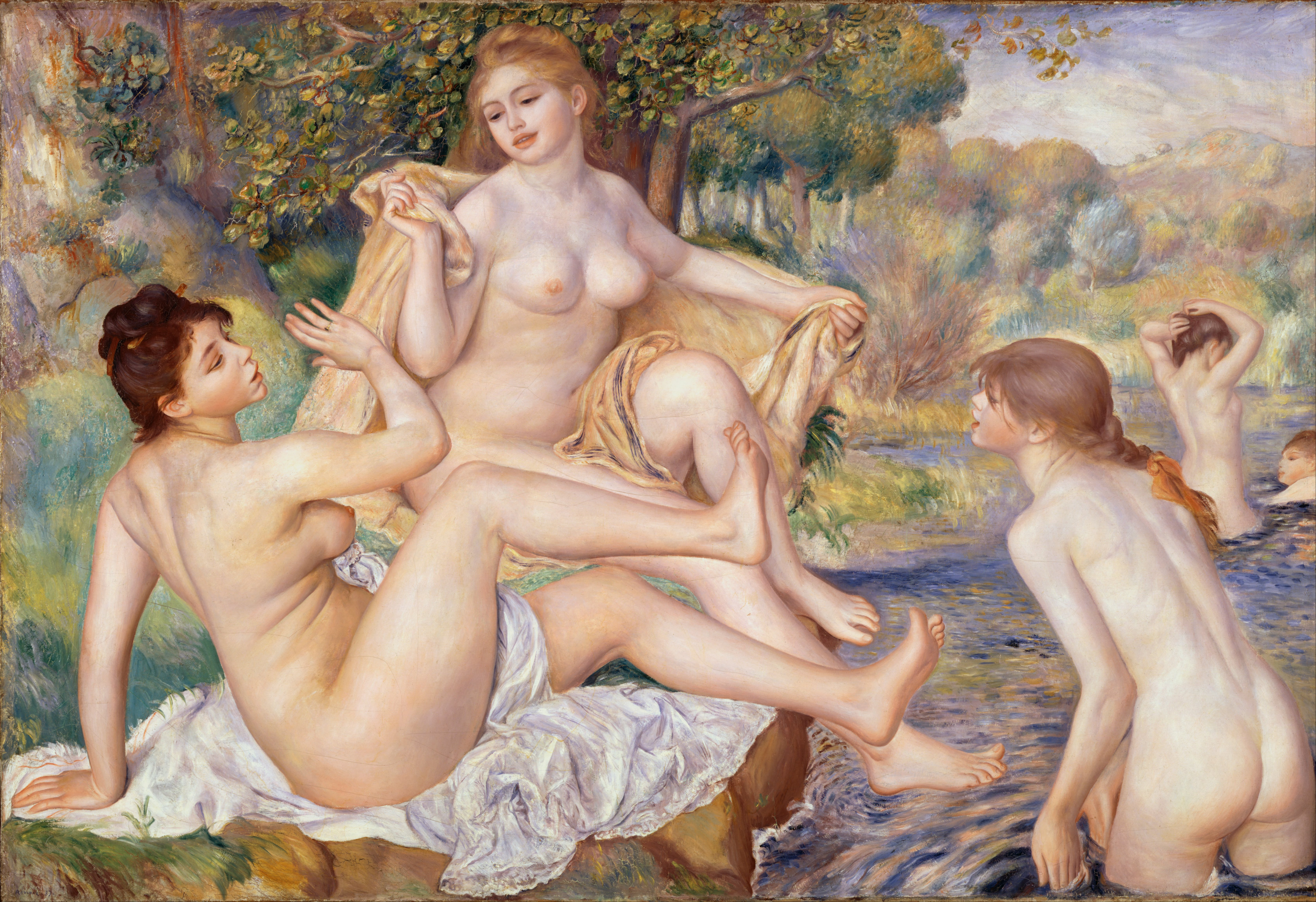
Pierre-Auguste Renoir, The Large Bathers, 1887

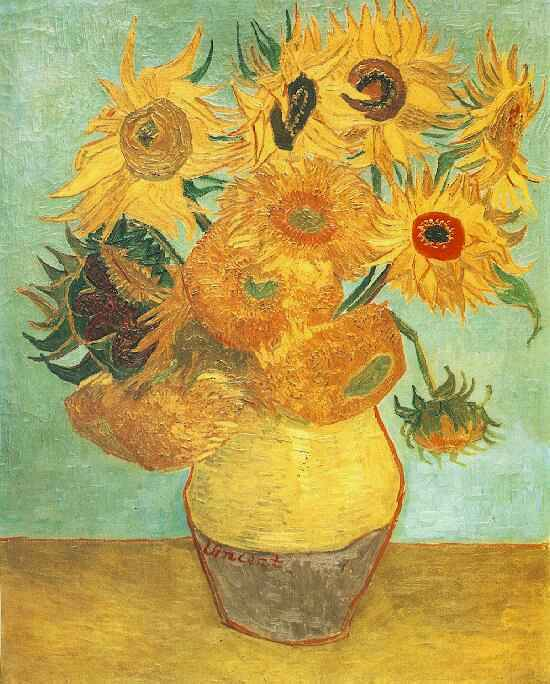
Vincent van Gogh, Sunflowers, Arles, 1889

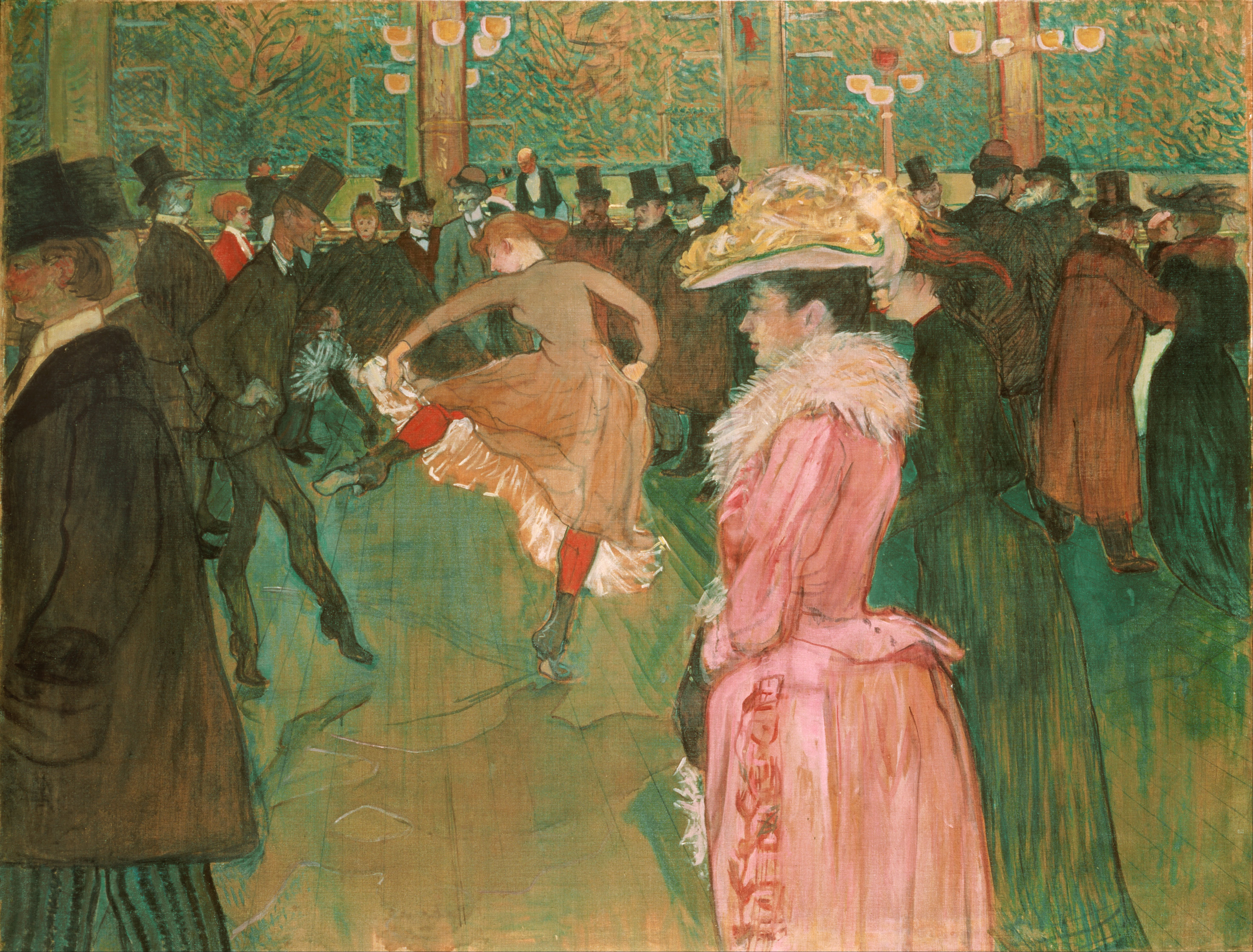
Henri Toulouse-Lautrec, At the Moulin Rouge, The Dance, 1890

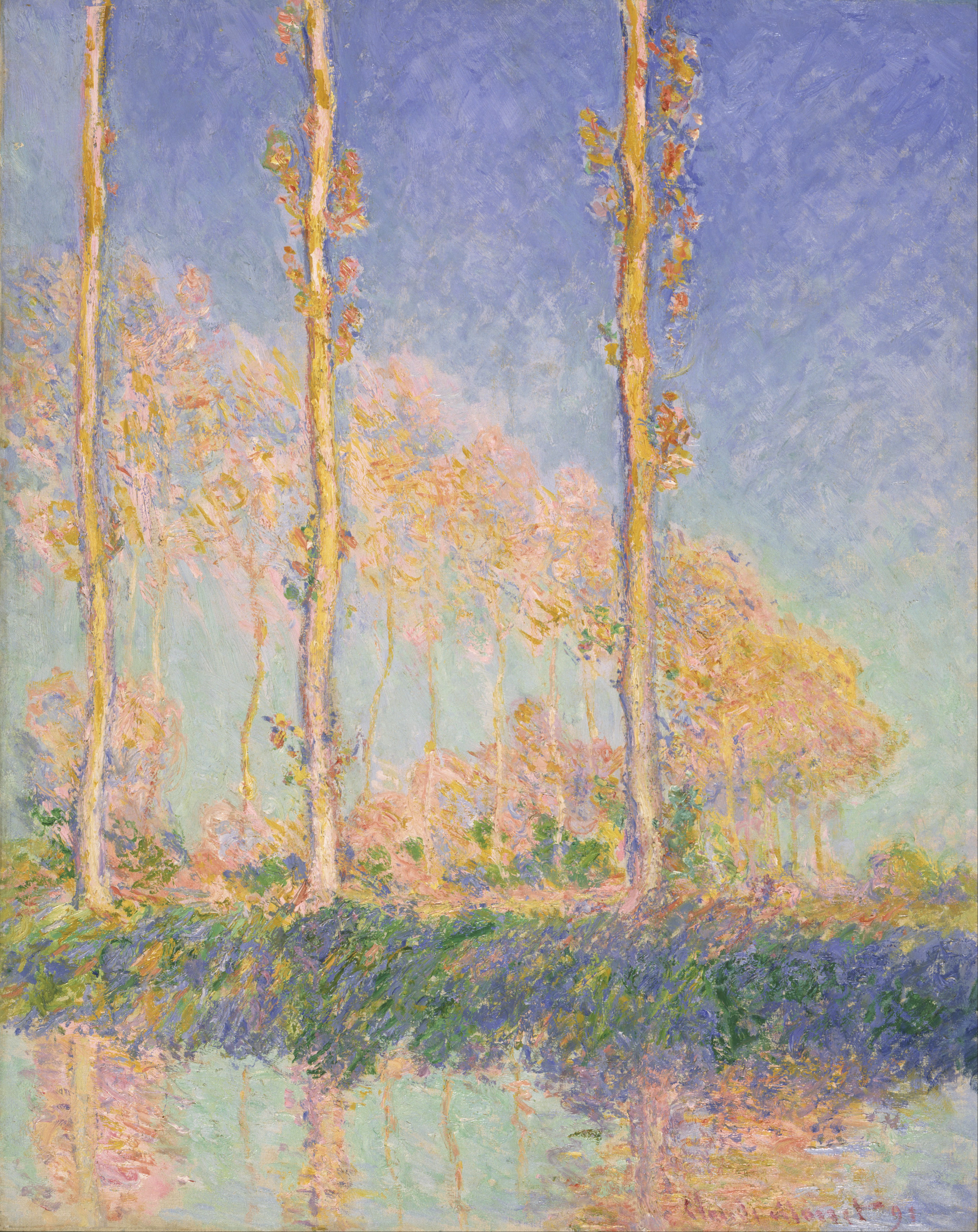
Claude Monet, Poplars (Autumn), 1891

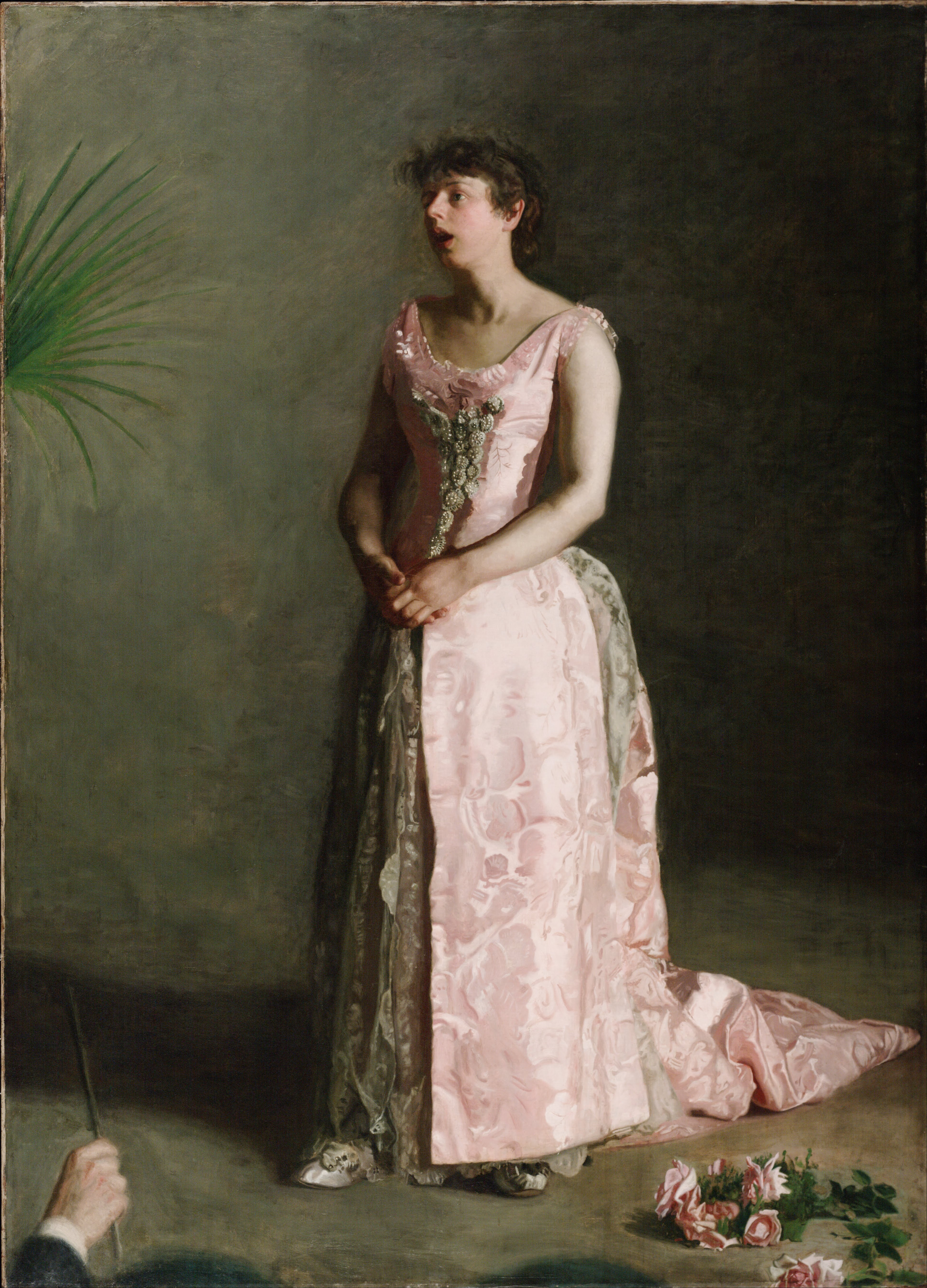
Thomas Eakins, The Concert Singer, 1890–1892

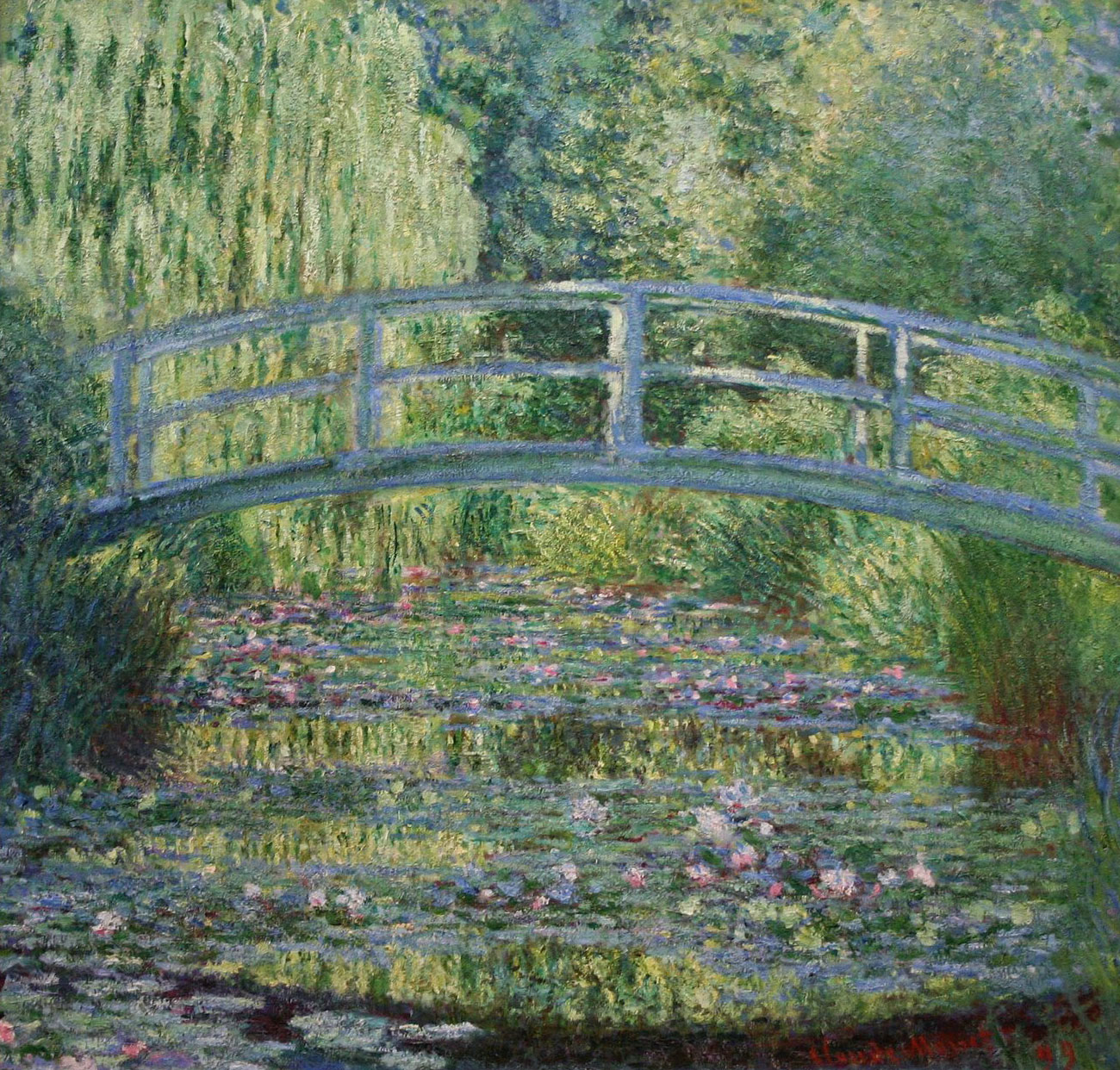
Claude Monet, Japanese Bridge and Water Lilies, c. 1899

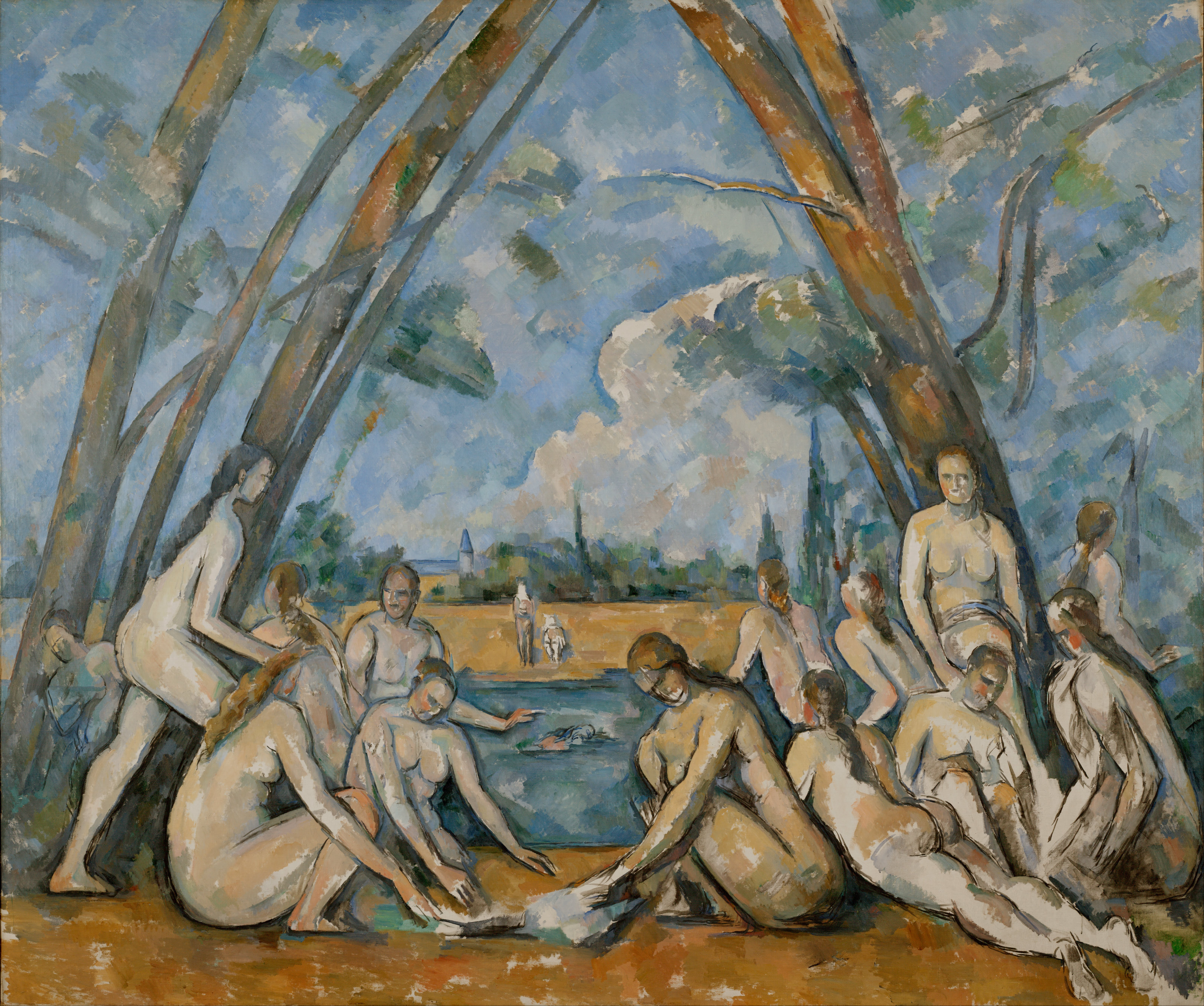
Paul Cézanne, The Bathers, 1898–1905

Pablo Picasso, Old Woman (Woman with Gloves), 1901

Gino Severini, La Modiste (The Milliner), 1910–11

Marc Chagall, Trois heures et demie (Le poète), Half-Past Three (The Poet), 1911

Marcel Duchamp, La sonate (Sonata), 1911

Jean Metzinger, Le goûter (Tea Time), 1911 – André Salmon dubbed this painting "The Mona Lisa of Cubism"

Marcel Duchamp, Nude Descending a Staircase, No.2, 1912

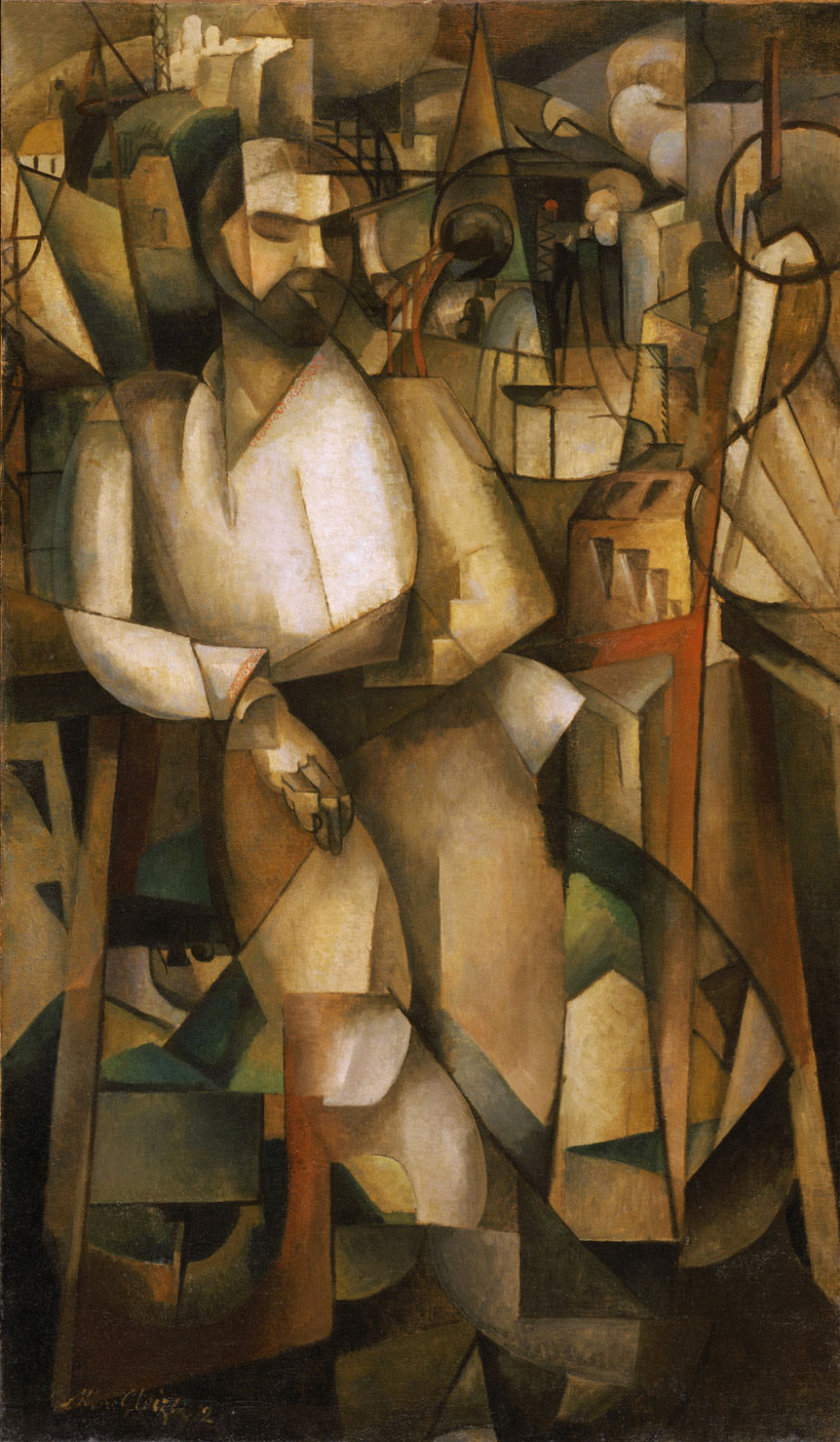
Albert Gleizes, l'Homme au Balcon, Man on a Balcony (Portrait of Dr. Théo Morinaud), 1912

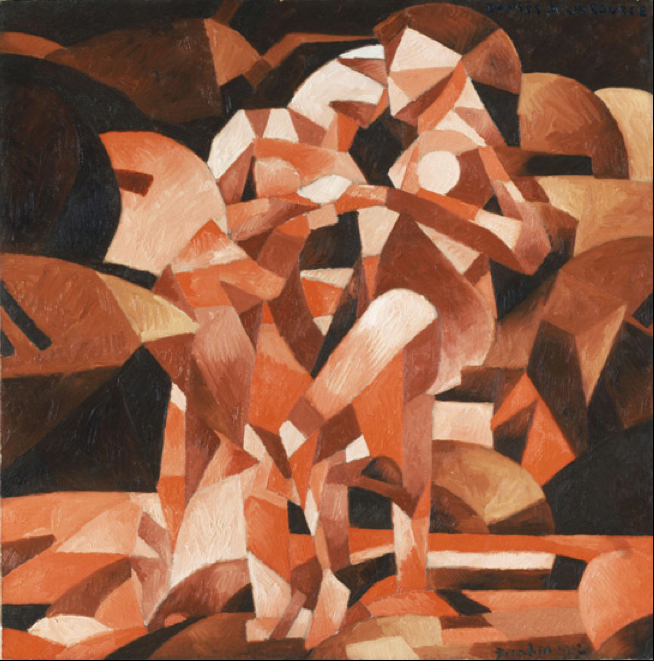
Francis Picabia, The Dance at the Spring, 1912

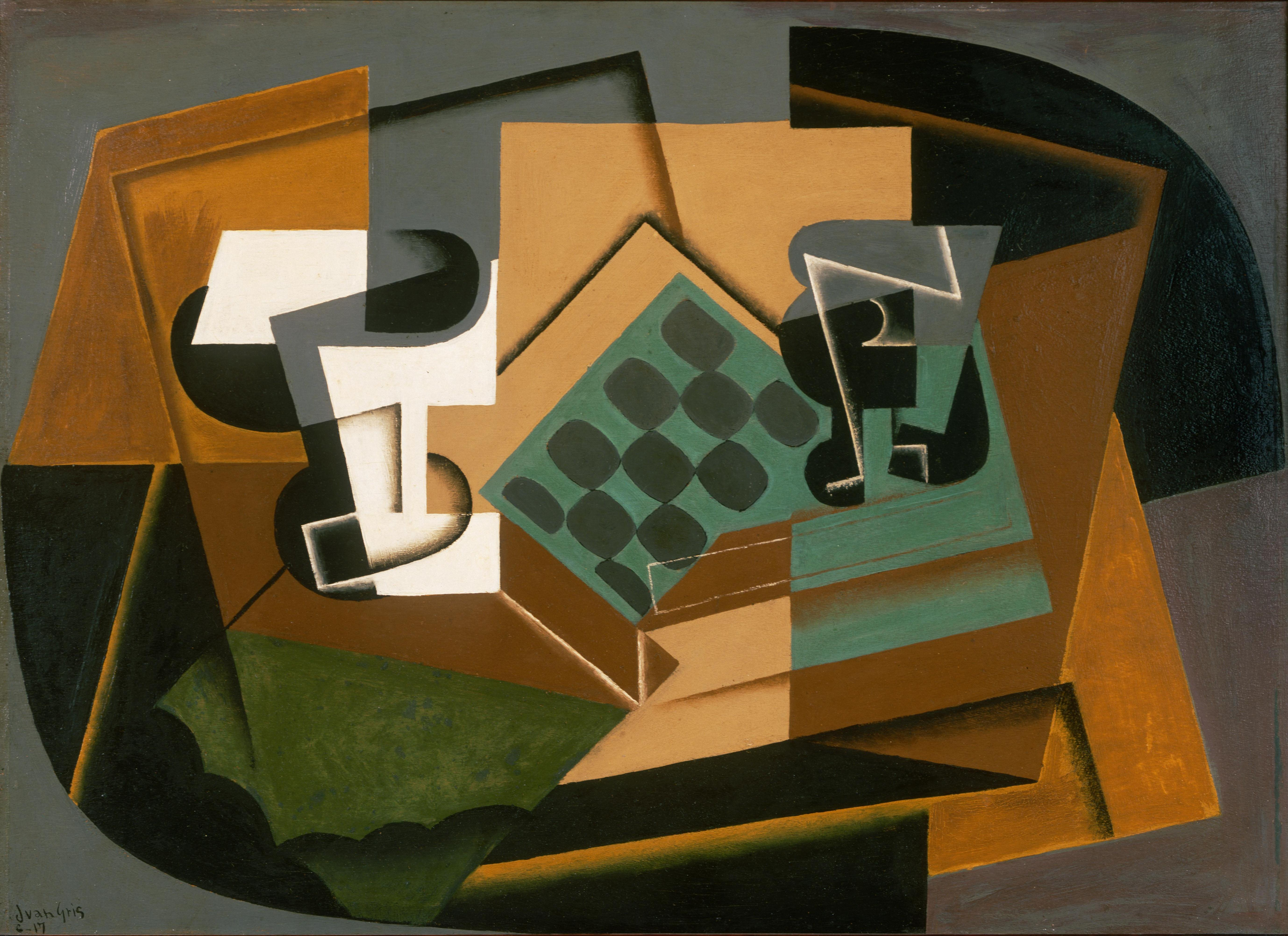
Juan Gris, Chessboard, Glass, and Dish, 1917

Joan Miró, 1920, Horse, Pipe and Red Flower

== In popular culture ==
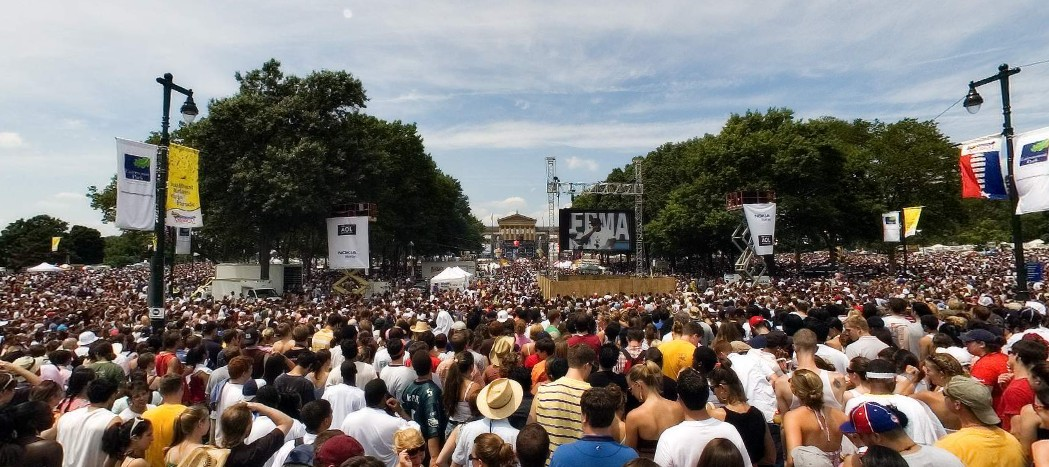
The Live 8 concert in 2005 with Benjamin Franklin Parkway (in foreground) and the museum (in background)

Besides being known for its architecture and collections, the Philadelphia Museum of Art has in recent decades become known due to the role it played in the Rocky films—Rocky (1976) and seven of its eight sequels, II, III, V, Rocky Balboa, Creed, Creed II, and Creed III. Visitors to the museum are often seen mimicking Rocky Balboa's (portrayed by Sylvester Stallone) famous run up the east entrance stairs, informally nicknamed the Rocky Steps. Screen Junkies named the museum's stairs the second most famous movie location behind only Grand Central Terminal in New York.

An 8.5 ft (2.6 m) tall bronze statue of the Rocky Balboa character was commissioned in 1980 and placed at the top of the stairs in 1982 for the filming of Rocky III. After filming was complete, Stallone donated the statue to the city of Philadelphia. The Philadelphia Art Commission eventually decided to relocate the statue to the now-defunct Spectrum sports arena due to controversy over its prominent placement at the top of the museum's front stairs and questions about its artistic merit. The statue was placed briefly on top of the stairs again for the 1990 film Rocky V and then returned to the Spectrum. In 2006, the statue was relocated to a new display area on the north side of the base of the stairs.

The museum provides the backdrop for concerts and parades because of its location at the end of the Ben Franklin Parkway. The Museum's east entrance area played host to the American venue of the international Live 8 concert held on July 2, 2005, with musical artists including Dave Matthews Band, Linkin Park and Maroon 5. The Philadelphia Freedom Concert, orchestrated and headlined by Elton John, was held two days later on the same outdoor stage from the Live 8 concert while a preceding ball was held inside the museum.

The opening twenty-minute sequence of Color Me Barbra, Barbra Streisand's second television special, was filmed at the museum, as was the acclaimed nine-minute museum sequence in the 1980 film Dressed to Kill.

On September 26, 2015, the Festival of Families event, attended by Pope Francis, was held along the Ben Franklin Parkway with musical performances by various acts within Eakins Oval in front of the museum, as well as in Logan Square.

On April 27, 2017, the 2017 NFL draft was held at the museum through April 29 of that year.

On February 8, 2018, the victory parade for the Philadelphia Eagles' win in Super Bowl LII finished upon the museum steps, where players and team personnel gave speeches from a lectern to the large crowd gathered along Benjamin Franklin Parkway. On February 14, 2025, another victory parade finished on the museum steps to celebrate the Eagles victory in Super Bowl LIX.

It was featured on the finale of The Amazing Race 36.

== See also ==
- 3rd Sculpture International
  - 70 Sculptors, photograph by Herbert Gehr
- Barnes Foundation
- Pennsylvania Academy of the Fine Arts
- Woodmere Art Museum
