= Anne d'Harnoncourt =

American art historian (1943–2008)

- Born: September 7, 1943; Washington, D.C., U.S.
- Died: June 1, 2008 (aged 64); Philadelphia, Pennsylvania, U.S.
- Title: Director and CEO, Philadelphia Museum of Art
- Predecessor: Jean Sutherland Boggs
- Successor: Timothy Rub
- Spouse: Joseph Rishel
- Parent(s): René d'Harnoncourt and Sarah Carr

Anne Julie d'Harnoncourt (September 7, 1943 – June 1, 2008) was an American curator, museum director, and art historian specializing in modern art. She was the director and CEO of the Philadelphia Museum of Art (PMA), a post she held from 1982 until her sudden death in 2008. She was also an expert scholar on the works of French artist Marcel Duchamp.

== Biography ==
=== Early life and education ===
d'Harnoncourt was born on September 7, 1943, in Washington, D.C. d'Harnoncourt grew up in New York City as the only child of René d'Harnoncourt, the director of the Museum of Modern Art from 1949 to 1967, who was of Austrian, Czech and French descent and Sarah (née Carr), a fashion designer. She was a cousin of the conductor Nikolaus Harnoncourt. From 1949 to 1961 she attended The Brearley School in New York City. She continued her studies at Radcliffe College in Cambridge, Massachusetts, where she majored in History and Literature of Europe and England since 1740, with additional course work in the history of architecture. Her BA thesis compared the poetry of Percy Bysshe Shelley and Friedrich Hölderlin. She graduated magna cum laude from Radcliffe in 1965.

=== Beginning career ===
D'Harnoncourt's first museum experience was at the Tate Gallery, London where she worked for six months as part of an MA degree at the Courtauld Institute of Art, University of London, preparing full catalog entries on thirty Pre-Raphaelite paintings and drawings in the collection in 1966–67. She graduated from there in 1967 with a Master of Arts degree in nineteenth-century painting. She then came to the Philadelphia Museum of Art (PMA) as a curatorial assistant in the Department of Painting and Sculpture from 1967 through 1969. During this time she helped oversee the installation of one of Marcel Duchamp's greatest and last major art installations, Étant donnés (1968) along with the coordination of Duchamp's wife Alexina Duchamp and his step-son Paul Matisse. In 1969, she was hired as assistant curator of twentieth-century art by the Art Institute of Chicago, a position she held until 1971. In that year, she also married Joseph J. Rishel, who was also an Assistant Curator at the Art Institute of Chicago at the time.

=== Curatorship at the Philadelphia Museum ===
In 1972, d'Harnoncourt returned to the Philadelphia Museum of Art as a curator of twentieth century art. She served in the position from 1972 and 1982. A specialist in the art of Marcel Duchamp, in 1973, she co-organized a major retrospective exhibition of his work, which originated in Philadelphia and traveled to the Museum of Modern Art and the Art Institute of Chicago. Other exhibitions organized or co-organized by Anne included Futurism and the International Avant-Garde (1980), Violet Oakley (1979), Eight Artists (1978) and John Cage: Scores & Prints (1982).

During her tenure as curator, she reinstalled the permanent galleries in the wing of the PMA devoted to 20th-century art, creating rooms specifically dedicated to the work of Duchamp and the sculptor Constantin Brâncuși. Under her curatorship, the PMA made the commitment to substantially build their contemporary collection, acquiring important works by Jasper Johns, Ellsworth Kelly, Dan Flavin, Sol LeWitt, Brice Marden, Agnes Martin, Elizabeth Murray, Claes Oldenburg, Katherine Anne Porter, Dorothea Rockburne, James Rosenquist, and Frank Stella among others.

=== Directorship of the Philadelphia Museum ===
In 1982, d'Harnoncourt, at the age of 38, was appointed the director of the Philadelphia Museum of Art, replacing Jean Sutherland Boggs. In 1997, she added the duties of the chief executive officer (CEO) to her role and served as both director and CEO. As Director, she fostered the growth and distinction of the PMA professional staff and encouraged a sequence of major exhibitions and publications by PMA curators and scholars. Among these were retrospectives of Brâncuși (1995), Cézanne (1996), Hon'ami Koetsu (2000), Barnett Newman (2002), and Salvador Dalí (2005); and surveys on topics ranging from Pennsylvania Germans: A Celebration of Their Arts (1983) to Japanese Design (1994), The Splendor of Eighteenth-Century Rome (2000) to Tesoros: The Arts in Latin America 1492–1820 (2006).

Each exhibition was accompanied by an illustrated book-length catalog, while other PMA publications under her leadership have included British Paintings in the Philadelphia Museum of Art (1986), Handbook of the Collections (1995), Gifts in Honor of the Museum's 125th Anniversary (2002), and Italian Paintings 1250–1450 (2004).

Between 1992 and 1995, in a massive building project undertaken to reinstall all of the PMA European collections, over 90 galleries were renovated and relit, while thousands of works of art were examined, conserved and placed in fresh contexts. Twenty galleries for modern and contemporary art were renovated and reopened in the fall of 2000.

As part of the long range plan, and in celebration of the PMA 125th anniversary year, a capital campaign with a goal of $200 million was formally launched in December 2000. Over $246 million was raised by the end of the campaign in 2004. In the same year, the PMA broke ground on repurposing of a landmark building across the street and embarked on a comprehensive master plan for its use and the additional steps necessary to meet its 25-year requirements for new or renovated space. The renovated structure, now named the Ruth and Raymond G. Perelman Building, opened in September 2007. It houses greatly expanded, state-of-the-art facilities for the PMA collections of prints, drawings, and photographs, costumes and textiles, modern and contemporary design, and Library and Archives.

=== The Gross Clinic ===
In 2006, d'Harnoncourt led a successful campaign to keep Thomas Eakins's masterpiece, The Gross Clinic, in Philadelphia by capital fundraising. Gathering more than 3600 donors from all fifty states and collaborating with the Philadelphia Museum of Art, the Pennsylvania Academy of the Fine Arts, politicians and philanthropists, together they raised $68 million to ensure that the painting would not move out of state.

=== Death ===
D'Harnoncourt died unexpectedly on 1 June 2008, in Philadelphia, from cardiac arrest. She was survived by her longtime husband, Joseph J. Rishel, who is a senior curator of European painting before 1900 at the Philadelphia Museum of Art. After her death in 2008, Cleveland Museum of Art director Timothy Rub was chosen as her successor.

== Service on boards and committees ==
- Regent of the Smithsonian Institution
- Board of Directors, The Henry Luce Foundation
- Board of Trustees, The Japan Society
- Board of Directors, The Fabric Workshop and Museum
- Board of Trustees, Fairmount Park Art Association
- Board of Trustees, The Philadelphia Award
- Board of Directors, The John Cage Trust
- Board of Directors, ARTstor
- Museum Panel, National Endowment for the Arts
- Visual Arts Panel, National Endowment for the Arts
- Board of Trustees, Hirshhorn Museum and Sculpture Garden
- Board of Trustees, Institute for Advanced Study, Princeton
- Indo/U.S. Sub-commission on Education and Culture
- Harvard University Art Museums Visiting Committee
- National Endowment for the Arts Indemnity Panel
- Board of Advisors, Center for Advanced Study in the Visual Arts, National Gallery of Art
- Pennsylvania Council on the Arts
- Visiting Committee, J. Paul Getty Museum
- Board of Advisors, State Hermitage Museum

== Recognition ==
d'Harnoncourt received numerous awards during her life, including:

- Captain Jonathan Fay Prize, Radcliffe College (1965)
- Elected member of the American Philosophical Society (1988)
- Chevalier dans l'Ordre des Arts et des Lettres, Republic of France (1995)
- Elected member of the American Academy of Arts and Sciences (1995)
- Philadelphia Award (1997)
- Founders Award for Exemplary Service to History, The Historical Society of Pennsylvania (2001)
- Honorary Doctorate of Laws, Princeton University, (2005)
- Order of the Aztec Eagle, Republic of Mexico (2007)
- Samuel S. Fleisher Art Memorial Founder's Award (2007)

The Philadelphia Museum of Art dedicated an outdoor area, called the Anne d'Harnoncourt Sculpture Garden, to the late director in honor of her tenure and love of art and the city. It has exhibited sculptures by Thomas Schutte, Scott Burton, Sol LeWitt, and Isamu Noguchi amongst others. The Claes Oldenberg sculpture Giant Three-Way Plug (Cube Tap) was donated and installed opposite the western entrance, as a memorial to d'Harnoncourt. Following her death, the museum renamed the western entrance roadway between 25th and Kelly Drive to the Spring Garden Bridge, from "Art Museum Drive" to "Anne d'Harnoncourt Drive".

== See also ==
- List of directors of the Philadelphia Museum of Art
- Women in the art history field

Cultural offices
Preceded by Jean Sutherland Boggs	The George D. Widener Director and Chief Executive Officer of the Philadelphia Museum of Art; 1982–2008	Succeeded by Timothy Rub
