= Mec Art =

20th-century art movement

Alain Jacquet's "Déjeuner sur l’herbe" was inspired by Manet's "Le déjeuner sur l’herbe"

Mec Art (short for Mechanical Art) is a European style of artwork created through photomechanical transfers via silkscreen printing onto an emulsified surface. The coinage of the term is disputed between a number of individuals, but French artist Alain Jacquet is frequently credited with its original use.

In contrast with the use of mass-media source images common in American Pop Art, Mec Art frequently referenced canonical and classical European works including Impressionist and Old Master paintings.
