= Sophie Matisse =

American contemporary artist (born 1965)

- Born: Sophie Alexina Victoire Matisse; February 13, 1965 (age 61); Boston, Massachusetts, US
- Education: Massachusetts College of Art; École des Beaux-Arts
- Known for: Contemporary art
- Notable work: Monna Lisa (Be Back in Five Minutes)
- Spouse(s): Alain Jacquet (m. 1992; died 2008); Amar Zribi (m. 2012; div. 2022)
- Website: sophiematisse.com

Sophie Alexina Victoire Matisse (born February 13, 1965) is an American contemporary artist. Matisse initially gained notice for her series of Missing Person paintings, in which she appropriated and embellished upon, or subtracted from, recognizable works from art history.

Media coverage often mentions Matisse's family background, an art pedigree originating with her great-grandfather, the 20th century painter Henri Matisse. The London Sunday Telegraph newspaper in 2003 referred to Matisse as "art royalty", a term occasionally paraphrased when discussing Matisse and her artwork.

== Early life ==
Matisse was born in Boston on February 13, 1965, and was raised in Cambridge, Massachusetts, having what has been described as a "hippie childhood". Her father is the sculptor Paul Matisse, whose grandfather was Henri Matisse. Matisse had "serious" dyslexia in her youth, which she remedied through creative pursuits.

== Education ==
Matisse began studies in 1985 at the Massachusetts College of Art and Design in Boston, but she dropped out after her first year. In 1990, she relocated to Paris and attended the École des Beaux-Arts, the same institution where her great-grandfather Henri Matisse had studied. She also bought supplies at the same art-supply store where he had shopped.

Matisse lived with her grandmother Teeny Duchamp in France for a time. Teeny, after divorcing Pierre Matisse, had married the French artist Marcel Duchamp (Duchamp died in 1968). Studies at the École des Beaux-Arts were not easy for Matisse; not only facing imposed expectations of being an art student in France named Matisse, but also being an American lacking proficiency in reading and writing French. After three years, Matisse was asked to leave. She did, however, meet the French artist Alain Jacquet while at École des Beaux-Arts, whom she married in 1992.

== Early career ==
In 1996, Matisse moved to New York City, creating her studio in Manhattan's Tribeca neighborhood, and soon began exhibiting her artwork. The artist's 1997 painting Monna Lisa (Be Back in Five Minutes) initiated art world interest which furthered her career. In the painting, Matisse replicated the background setting of Leonardo da Vinci's original, but omitted the eponymous subject Mona Lisa from the scene. It was the first of what became her signature Be Back in 5 Minutes series.

The Be Back in Five Minutes series gave Matisse her first widespread exposure as an artist, in her own right, and informed her work for years thereafter. In those paintings, Matisse reproduced the recognizable settings of famous paintings, always omitting the figures; as if the models had "stepped out for the moment". Famous works of Vermeer also figured prominently in other early entries to the series; Young Woman with a Water Pitcher, The Art of Painting, and Girl with a Pearl Earring were all reinterpreted by Matisse in the late 1990s, minus the figures portrayed by Johannes Vermeer.

== Exhibitions ==
Although she had previously participated in group exhibitions in New York and elsewhere, Matisse's first solo exhibition opened in January 2002, at the gallery which continued to represent her in New York, Francis Naumann Fine Art. It was the gallery's first exhibition of Contemporary art. Matisse's Monna Lisa (Be Back in Five Minutes) was featured in this first exhibition along with over twenty others of the artist's absentee paintings.

Among American artworks from which Matisse "removed" the occupants are Grant Wood's American Gothic, in which the pitchfork is left standing alone in the foreground, and Edward Hopper's Nighthawks, in which the diner is replicated devoid of customers and staff. Both of these were painted in 2001. The artwork of Henri Matisse is also among those reinterpreted. Goldfish reproduces the scene as originally portrayed by him, minus the goldfish. The Conversation leaves an empty chair by the window.

Artwork from this series was also assembled for an exhibition titled "Once Removed" at the upstate New York Katonah Museum of Art in the summer of 2005.

=== Matisse's reinterpretation of Guernica ===
In 2003, Matisse added Pablo Picasso's Guernica to the number of paintings she reinterpreted. This time, Matisse opted to "colorize" Picasso's monochromatic "anti-war testament" — a painting to which she had never actually stood "face to face". Despite her great-grandfather and Picasso's "rocky relationship". Matisse followed her own color sensibilities, as opposed to mimicking those of her great-grandfather.

Matisse used Guerra Paint acrylics and painted on canvas, testing color combinations by first painting many small sketches. She kept true to the impact of Picasso's original by painting it large-scale, approximately 8 by 20 feet (2.4 by 6.1 m). Her efforts yielded several paintings and various drawings, which culminated in her Sophie Matisse Does Guernica exhibition, early in 2003 in New York. One piece, 911 Guernica, uses Guernica as the motif to convey her own first hand experiences witnessing the terrorist attack on New York's Twin Towers from her neighborhood near the site. Matisse's Guernica exhibition was scheduled to coincide with the Museum of Modern Art's dual survey exhibiting the works of both Picasso and Matisse.

The artist and her "Be Back in 5 minutes" series faced as much opposition as they did praise, with some critics deriding her "coloring-in" of Picasso by comparing it with the colorization of black and white movies. Art critic Arthur Danto said Matisse's work "demonstrates why Picasso was right to use black and white and gray, and why Matisse was exactly right never to have attempted to depict violence".

Matisse in 2003 also participated in a project coordinated by Dodie Kazanjian for Vogue magazine. "Self Portraits: A Vogue Portfolio" appeared in print as a ten-page feature in the December 2003, issue of the magazine. As the title suggests, each artist submitted a "self-portrait". Matisse was featured among other female artists of her generation such as Kiki Smith. Matisse's contribution was a "Be Back in 5 Minutes" interpretation of Gustave Courbet's erotic painting The Origin of the World, this time removing the 19th century French painter's graphically portrayed nude model, leaving only the rumpled bedsheets. The completed artworks were exhibited at Deitch Projects SoHo gallery space at the time of publication.

=== Zebra stripe paintings ===
Matisse began a new series of paintings in the spring of 2004, which culminated in her third solo exhibition, the Zebra Stripe Paintings, debuting in New York in the latter months of 2005. Matisse once again appropriated historically significant artworks, this time superimposing her own imagery in the form of zebra stripes overlapping the originals. In these paintings, all acrylics and oil on canvas, the appropriated originals are somewhat obscured by the stripes, rendering them less readily identifiable, and Matisse herself has joked that her dyslexia may have been helpful in creating these works. The series was compared to James Rosenquist's later works, juxtaposing and overlapping seemingly unrelated imagery. Matisse again appropriated one of her great-grandfather's artworks, this time overlaying his Blue Nude with her zebra stripes.

== Special projects ==
Matisse has provided artwork in collaboration with business interests and also in support of charitable causes. In 2008, She collaborated with Kilian Hennessy, heir to the Hennessy lineage of cognac makers, providing artwork for a line of fragrances. Matisse added her personal touch to fifty bottles of Kilian perfumes, hand-painting, signing and numbering every bottle and its box. Each of the limited edition creations bore a design different from the others. Additionally, Matisse collaborated with @byKilian in December 2009 on 15 hand-painted, Special Edition (Gold) perfume bottles, which were sold to key By Kilian clients.

For an exhibition titled The Art of the Game coinciding with San Diego's Beyond the Border International Contemporary Art Fair of 2009, Matisse created five chess sets of her own design. She considered her participation "a tribute" to the game's presence within her family in general, and her upbringing personally.

In 2010, Matisse participated in the New York installment of an international campaign produced by the non-profit group Sing For Hope. The project called for 60 pianos to be placed in specifically chosen public places around a chosen city, in this case New York City, each first hand-painted by participating artists and amateurs alike. The decorated pianos remained at their specified locations for two weeks in July 2010, with the instructions "Play me, I'm yours" clearly marked, and an attendant present to oversee and invite passersby. Matisse hand-painted four Kimball pianos, all of which had been donated for the cause, even painting the piano keys. Some, if not all, of Sophie's four were displayed in the lobby of Avery Fisher Hall and Lincoln Center promenade. All 60 pianos were auctioned that fall.

Matisse was represented by Francis Naumann Fine Art, LLC, in New York City. from 2003 to 2020. Matisse is now represented by the Baahng Gallery in New York City.

== Personal life ==
In 1992, when she was 27, Matisse married pop artist Alain Jacquet, whom she had met during her years at the École des Beaux-Arts, Paris. Jacquet similarly reworked classic artworks into his own creations, which have been described as "pop subterfuge". The marriage produced a daughter, Gaïa Jacquet-Matisse, born in 1993. Matisse and Jacquet were considered a "perfect couple" by friends and acquaintances, and remained married until Jacquet's death, at age 69, in 2008. Matisse later married Amar Zribi in St. Martin FWI, in 2010. Matisse filed for divorce from Zribi in The Supreme Court of the State of New York on June 9, 2020. She was granted a divorce on June 16, 2022.

=== Family background ===
Matisse's father is the sculptor and inventor Paul Matisse, a Harvard graduate. Her grandfather, Paul's father, was Modern art dealer Pierre Matisse, who had moved to America in the 1920s. Pierre was the youngest child of 20th century painter Henri Matisse, Sophie's great-grandfather.

Henri Matisse died in 1954, aged 85, eleven years before Sophie's birth. Family members expressed concern for Sophie's future as an artist in her own right, and suggested she use her great grandmother, Amelie Pareyre as her family name to avoid constant comparison to Henri Matisse. Only by incidentally noticing her family name on museum walls did Sophie, as a young child, come to consider that her great-grandfather may have been someone "exceptional".

Matisse's step-grandfather was the artist Marcel Duchamp, who reinterpreted Leonardo da Vinci's Mona Lisa in his L.H.O.O.Q. by adding a mustache. Duchamp married Matisse's grandmother Alexina "Teeny" Matisse, an American, in 1954 after she and Pierre Matisse had divorced. Matisse has cited Duchamp as an influence, once saying "his presence stopped me from getting too serious". Art writers have pointed to the "visual jokes" sometimes apparent in Matisse's own work as a sign of Duchamp's influence.
