= Moaning Lisa =

Moaning Lisa may refer to:

- Moaning Lisa (band), an Australian alternative rock band
- "Moaning Lisa" (The Simpsons), the 6th episode of the first season of American animated television series The Simpsons

== See also ==
- "Moaning Lisa Smile", a 2014 song by Wolf Alice
- Mona Lisa (disambiguation)
