= Colored Mona Lisa =

1963 painting by Andy Warhol

- Artist: Andy Warhol
- Year: 1963
- Medium: Silkscreen inks and graphite on canvas
- Movement: Pop art
- Dimensions: 208.6 cm × 319.7 cm (82.1 in × 125.9 in)
- Location: Private collection

Colored Mona Lisa is a painting created by the American artist Andy Warhol in 1963. The painting, which depicts Leonardo da Vinci’s Mona Lisa, sold for $56.2 million at Christie's in 2015.

== History ==
Leonardo da Vinci’s Mona Lisa has become one of the most recognizable paintings in the world since it was created in 1503. In 1963, the painting made a rare voyage across the Atlantic from Paris for exhibitions at the National Gallery of Art in Washington, D.C., and the Metropolitan Museum of Art in New York.

Andy Warhol, the leading artist of the pop art movement, was an enthusiast of pop culture. In response to the US tour of the Mona Lisa, Warhol created his own multicolored depiction, Colored Mona Lisa. It is an early example of his prowess of inextricably linking high art and consumer culture. Metropolitan Museum of Art curator Henry Geldzahler came up with the idea for the painting and the work's source image was taken from a brochure published by the museum.

In May 2015, Warhol's painting sold for $56.2 million at Christie's Post-War and Contemporary Art Evening Sale, surpassing its high estimate of $35 million.

== See also ==
- Mona Lisa replicas and reinterpretations
