= Mona Lisa (disambiguation) =

The Mona Lisa is a portrait of a woman by Leonardo da Vinci.

Mona Lisa or Monalisa may also refer to:

== Film and television ==
- Mona Lisa (film), a 1986 British film
- Monalisa (film), a 2004 Indian film
- "Mona Lisa" (NCIS), a 2019 television episode
- "Mona Lisa" (The Outer Limits), a 2001 episode of The Outer Limits
- Mona Lisa (TMNT), a Teenage Mutant Ninja Turtles character
- Mona Lisa, a Courage the Cowardly Dog character
- Mona Lisa, a character in Daybreak
- Mona-Lisa Saperstein, a character in Parks and Recreation
- Mona Lisa Vito, a character in My Cousin Vinny

== Music ==
- Mona Lisa (band), a French band active in the 1970s
- Mona Lisa (EP), a 2011 EP by MBLAQ
- MonaLisa Twins, a pop rock band, formed by twin sisters Mona Wagner and Lisa Wagner

=== Songs ===
- "Mona Lisa" (J-Hope song), 2025
- "Mona Lisa" (Porter Robinson song), 2024
- "Mona Lisa" (Dominic Fike song), 2023
- "Mona Lisa" (Lil Wayne song), 2018
- "Mona Lisa" (Nat King Cole song), 1950
- "Monalisa" (Lojay and Sarz song), 2021
- "Monalisa" (Lojay and Sarz song), 2021
- "The Mona Lisa" (song), a 2013 song by Brad Paisley
- "Mona Lisa (When The World Comes Down)", by the All-American Rejects from When the World Comes Down, 2008
- "Mona Lisa", by Bayside from Killing Time, 2011
- "Mona Lisa", by Big Sean from Hall of Fame, 2013
- "Mona Lisa", by Britney Spears from Britney & Kevin: Chaotic, 2005
- "Mona Lisa", by Chris Clouse that was included on the Sansa e200 portable music player, 2006
- "Mona Lisa", by Dead Sara from Pleasure to Meet You, 2015
- "Mona Lisa", by The Lonely Island from Popstar: Never Stop Never Stopping, 2016
- "Mona Lisa", by Nicki Minaj from The Pinkprint, 2014
- "Mona Lisa", by Sabrina Carpenter from Singular: Act I, 2018
- "Mona Lisa", by Slick Rick from The Great Adventures of Slick Rick, 1988
- "Mona Lisa", by Soojin from Rizz, 2024
- "Mona Lisa", by Wyclef Jean featuring the Neville Brothers from Wyclef Jean Presents The Carnival, 1997
- "Masterpiece (Mona Lisa)", by Jazmine Sullivan from Reality Show, 2015

== People ==
- Lisa del Giocondo or Mona Lisa (1479–1542), the subject of the painting
- Mona Lisa (actress) (1922–2019), Filipino film actress
- Mona Lisa (singer) (born 1979), American R&B singer
- Mona Lisa, silent film actress who acted in Too Wise Wives
- Mozeza Ashraf Monalisa (born 1987), Bangladeshi actress, model and dancer
- Monalisa Chinda (born 1974), Nigerian actress
- Monalisa Perrone (born 1969), Brazilian journalist
- Yvonne Cherrie (born 1981), Tanzanian film actress
- Antara Biswas (born 1982), Indian film actress

== Other uses ==
- Mona Lisa (Prado), a painting of the same subject as Leonardo da Vinci's Mona Lisa
- Mona Lisa (opera), a 1915 opera by Max von Schillings
- Mona Lisa (crater), a crater on Venus
- MS Mona Lisa, a ship

== See also ==
- Deeba (born 1947), Pakistani film actress known by the nickname Pakistani Mona Lisa
- Mona Lizza, Pakistani actress
- Salaì (1480–1524)
- Moaning Lisa (disambiguation)
