= Alain Jacquet =

French painter

- Born: February 22, 1939; Neuilly-sur-Seine, France
- Died: September 4, 2008 (aged 69)
- Occupation: artist

Alain Jacquet (22 February 1939 – 4 September 2008) was a French artist representative of the Nouvelle Figuration movement that was linked to the American Pop Art movement. Jacquet lived in New York and Paris and taught at the École Nationale Supérieure des Arts Décoratifs. He was married (1992) to Sophie Matisse, great-granddaughter of the French Fauvist artist Henri Matisse. They had one daughter, Gaïa Jacquet-Matisse. Jacquet's art is displayed in the Museum of Modern Art in New York, and the Centre Pompidou, the Musée National d'Art Moderne, in Paris. Jacquet died of esophageal cancer in Manhattan.

== Life and career ==
Jacquet was born in Neuilly-sur-Seine, France. Though he studied architecture at École des Beaux-Arts, as a painter he was an autodidact.

Camouflage Botticelli (Birth of Venus) (1963–64) is a famous work of his. Camouflage Botticelli is located in the Anchorage Museum, in Alaska. In a series of camouflage paintings, he often used motifs from older, very famous paintings, such as in this case from the painting The Birth of Venus by Sandro Botticelli. Jacquet also borrowed the form of Manet's Luncheon on the Grass, which itself had referred to the 1515 engraving The Judgment of Paris by Marcantonio Raimondi and The Pastoral Concert c. 1510, by Giorgione or Titian in the Louvre, in a series of 95 identical serigraphies portraying the art critic Pierre Restany and the painter Mario Schifano, one of which was left in the lobby of the hotel Chelsea in New York City for payment of his room.
