= L.H.O.O.Q. =

Readymade by Marcel Duchamp

- Marcel Duchamp, 1919, L.H.O.O.Q.
- Artist: Marcel Duchamp
- Year: 1919
- Type: Readymade (rectified)
- Medium: Pencil on reproduction
- Dimensions: 19.7 cm × 12.4 cm (7.8 in × 4.9 in)
- Location: Various versions in multiple collections

Marcel Duchamp, 1919, L.H.O.O.Q., published in 391, n. 12, March 1920

L.H.O.O.Q. (French pronunciation: [ɛl aʃ o o ky]) is a work of art by Marcel Duchamp. First conceived in 1919, the work is one of what Duchamp referred to as readymades, or more specifically a rectified (i.e. altered) ready-made. The readymade involves taking mundane, often utilitarian objects not generally considered to be art and transforming them, by adding to them, changing them, or (as in the case of his work Fountain) simply renaming and reorienting them and placing them in an appropriate setting. In L.H.O.O.Q. the found object (objet trouvé) is a cheap postcard reproduction of Leonardo da Vinci's early 16th-century painting Mona Lisa onto which Duchamp drew a moustache and beard in pencil and appended the title.

== Overview ==
, La Joconde fumant la pipe, Le Rire, 1887]] The subject of the Mona Lisa treated satirically had already been explored in 1887 by Eugène Bataille (aka Sapeck) when he created Mona Lisa smoking a pipe, published in Le Rire. It is not clear whether Duchamp was familiar with Bataille's interpretation.

The name of the piece, L.H.O.O.Q., is a gramogram; the letters pronounced in French sound like "Elle a chaud au cul", "She is hot in the arse", or "She has a hot ass"; "avoir chaud au cul" is a vulgar expression implying that a person has sexual restlessness. (Compare the English expression “to have hot pants.”) In a late interview (Schwarz 203), Duchamp gives a loose translation of L.H.O.O.Q. as "there is fire down below".

Francis Picabia, in attempting to publish L.H.O.O.Q. in his magazine 391, could not wait for the work to be sent from New York City, so, with Duchamp's permission, he drew the moustache on Mona Lisa himself (forgetting the goatee). Picabia wrote underneath "Tableau Dada par Marcel Duchamp". Duchamp noticed the missing goatee. Two decades later, Duchamp corrected the omission on Picabia's replica, found by Jean Arp at a bookstore. Duchamp drew the goatee in black ink with a fountain pen, and wrote "Moustache par Picabia / barbiche par Marcel Duchamp / avril 1942".

As with many of his readymades, Duchamp made multiple versions of L.H.O.O.Q. of differing sizes and in different media, one of which, an unmodified black-and-white reproduction of the Mona Lisa mounted on card, is called L.H.O.O.Q. Shaved. The masculinized female introduces the theme of gender reversal, which appealed to Duchamp, who adopted his own female pseudonym, Rrose Sélavy, pronounced "Eros, c'est la vie" ("Eros, that's life").

Primary responses to L.H.O.O.Q. interpreted it as an attack on the iconic Mona Lisa and traditional art, a stroke of épater le bourgeois promoting Dadaist ideals. According to one commentator:

The creation of L.H.O.O.Q. profoundly transformed the perception of La Joconde (what the French call the painting, in contrast with the Americans and Germans, who call it the Mona Lisa). In 1919 the cult of Jocondisme was practically a secular religion of the French bourgeoisie and an important part of their self image as patrons of the arts. They regarded the painting with reverence, and Duchamp's salacious comment and defacement was a major stroke of epater le bourgeois ("freaking out" or substantially offending the bourgeois).

According to Rhonda Roland Shearer, the apparent reproduction is in fact a copy partly modeled on Duchamp's own face.

== Parodies of Duchamp's parodic Mona Lisa ==
=== Pre-Internet era ===
- Salvador Dalí created his Self Portrait as Mona Lisa in 1954, referencing L.H.O.O.Q. in collaboration with Philippe Halsman. This work incorporated photographs of a wild-eyed Dalí showing his handlebar moustache and a handful of coins.
- Icelandic painter Erró then incorporated Dalí's version of L.H.O.O.Q. into a 1958 composition that also included a film-still from Buñuel's Un Chien Andalou.
- Fernand Léger and René Magritte have also adapted L.H.O.O.Q., using their own iconography.

=== Internet and computerized parodies ===
One form of computerized parody using the Internet juxtaposes layers over the original, on a webpage. In one example, the original layer is Mona Lisa. The second layer is mostly transparent but opaque in some places (for example, where Duchamp located the moustache), obscuring the original layer. This technology is described at the George Washington University Law School website. An example of this technology is a copy of Mona Lisa with a series of different superpositions—first Duchamp's moustache, then an eyepatch, then a hat, a hamburger, and so on. The point of this technology (which is explained on the website for a copyright law class) is that it permits a parody that need not involve making an infringing copy of the original work if it simply uses an inline link to the original, which is presumably on an authorized webpage. According to the website at which the material is located:

The layers paradigm is significant in a computer-related or Internet context because it readily describes a system in which the person ultimately responsible for creating the composite (here, corresponding to [a modern-day] Duchamp) does not make a physical copy of the original work in the sense of storing it in permanent form (fixed as a copy) distributed to the end user. Rather, the person distributes only the material of the subsequent layers, [so that] the aggrieved copyright owner (here, corresponding to Leonardo da Vinci) distributes the material of the underlying [original Mona Lisa] layer, and the end user's system receives both. The end user's system then causes a temporary combination, in its computer RAM and the user's brain. The combination is a composite of the layers. Framing and superimposition of popup windows exemplify this paradigm.

Other computer-implemented distortions of L.H.O.O.Q. or Mona Lisa reproduce elements of the original, thereby creating an infringing reproduction if the underlying work is protected by copyright. Leonardo's rights in Mona Lisa would, of course, have long expired had such rights existed in his age.

== See also ==
- List of works by Marcel Duchamp
- Mona Lisa replicas and reinterpretations
- Legacy of Mona Lisa
- Walker's L.H.O.O.Q.
- Gramogram, the artwork's title is an example of this type of pun
