= Maria Martins (artist) =

Brazilian sculptor, designer, writer, painter, writer and musician

- Born: Maria de Lourdes Alves; 7 August 1894; Campanha, Brazil
- Died: 27 March 1973 (aged 78); Rio de Janeiro, Brazil
- Known for: Sculpture
- Spouses: Otavio Tarquinio de Souza; Carlos Martins

Maria Martins (born Maria de Lourdes Alves; 7 August 1894 – 27 March 1973) was a Brazilian visual artist who was particularly well known for her modern sculptures.

== Early life ==
Maria de Lourdes Alves was born on 7 August 1894 in Campanha, Brazil to a minister father and a pianist mother. Her first husband was a literary critic named Otavio Tarquinio de Souza, with whom she had a daughter. However, when she married the young diplomat Carlos Martins in 1926 she changed her name to Maria Martins.

Maria Martins is known in the international world as "the sculptor of the tropics" and "the great sculptor of Surrealism".

== Career ==
Martins studied in diverse geographical locations in her early years, representing a time frame 1894 to 1938. Her initial education was in music at a French school in Rio de Janeiro, pursuing a career as a professional musician. Early in her first marriage she became interested in sculpture, and studied in Paris under Catherine Barjansky. While living in Japan she studied ceramics and Zen philosophy with D. T. Suzuki at the University of Kyoto.

Her interest in sculptural abstractions was inspired by simple large wooden sculptures of her early Belgium instructor Oscar Jespers. This sculptural interest evolved to Surrealism, exploration of her Brazilian/Amazonian roots, and bronze casting under the teaching of Jacques Lipchitz. Lipchitz introduced Martins to bronze casting using the Egyptian lost-wax casting technique, which she evolved by adding fat to the wax to increase the detail in her bronze sculptures. Eventually bronze became her creative process of choice.

Martins' association with the 1940s expatriate artist community in New York helped formulate her view on art’s political power. These views on art, its role in peace, and the responsibility of artists is articulated in an essay that was read into the U.S. congressional record on June 18, 1947 by Congressman Jacob Javits of New York. In the essay, titled Art, Liberation and Peace, she describes a world in which differences of race, nationalities, religions, social conditions and opinions are freely discussed, thereby negating the impacts of politics and wealth. She highlighted Adolf Hitler’s destruction of works of art as the beginning of his “nihilistic drive of conquest, domination and destruction”. She describes art as an appeal to emotions, a liberation and is immortal emphasizing that art’s value is to mobilize human beings to counter the impacts of war.

In 1939, her husband Carlos became the Brazilian ambassador to the United States, moving their family to the States. During her US residency from 1939 to 1949, Martins studied with the sculptors Jacques Lipchitz and printmaker Stanley William Hayter. Lipchitz introduced her to bronze casting and encouraged exploration of Surrealism and her Brazilian roots. She evolved to using the Egyptian lost-wax casting technique as her creative process of choice. In 1941 Martins had a solo exhibition of her work, entitled Maria, at the Corcoran Gallery of Art in Washington, D.C. In 1943 the Valentine Gallery in New York City organized a two-artist exhibition with Martins and Piet Mondrian, Maria: New Sculptures and Mondrian: New Paintings. Martins later bought Mondrian's famous work from the exhibition, Broadway Boogie Woogie, for only $800, though she eventually donated it to the Museum of Modern Art. Also in 1943 she met André Breton and other surrealists in exile and collaborated with them in the surrealist journal VVV. Breton celebrated her sculpture and wrote the preface to the catalogue for her 1947 solo show at the Julien Levy Gallery in New York, it states that “Maria owes nothing to the sculpture of the past or the present – she is far too sure, for that, of the original rhythm which is increasingly lacking in modern sculpture; she is prodigal with what the Amazon has given her”. She took part in the International Surrealist Exhibition in Paris in 1947.

=== Surrealism ===
Martins was completely marginalized in accounts of Surrealism for decades, despite her sculpture being included in a number of surrealist exhibitions and publications and the prominent role she played in the movement during the 1940s. Martins came to the surrealist movement late. She borrowed from artists like Giacometti, Ernst, and Arp. Martins learned to work in bronze from Jacques Lipchitz, whose influence can perhaps be seen in “Impossible III” (1946). Brazilian anthropophagy and cannibalism interested Martins and informed much of her later work. Example of this can be seen in works like her 1942 sculpture "Yara", inspired by the Tupi or Guarani Indian myth of a man-eating river goddess. Yara would sing her song of seduction to passing men enticing them to visit her jungle domain where she would devour them, like an insect in a Venus flytrap. Imagery like this caught the attention of Surrealist Movement founder, Andre Breton, at her 1943 exhibition at the Valentine Gallery. Here, Breton connected Maria's interest in the mythology of the Amazon River with his own desire to create new myths to base a future society on. Breton recounted the impact Martin’s sculpture had on him in his preface to her 1947 exhibition at the Julien Levy Gallery:

"Maria's sculpture began to carry a whole legend on its shoulders, a legend that was nothing less than the Amazon itself. Sculpture garlanded, like the Amazon’s own waters, with tropical creepers. This legend sang in those works of hers, which I had the chance to see in New York in 1943 and admired so greatly. Just as it sang with all its immemorial voices man’s passion from birth to death, re-created in symbols of unparalleled denseness by the Indian tribes which have succeeded each other along those treacherous banks. In her bronzes...Maria has succeeded marvelously in capturing at their primitive source not only anguish, temptation and fever, but also the sunrise, happiness and calm, and even occasionally pure delight; she is the emanation of all these things, all these wings and flowers. Maria owes nothing to the sculpture of the past or the present—she is far too sure, for that, of the original rhythm, which is increasingly lacking in modern sculpture; she is prodigal with what the Amazon has given her—the overwhelming abundance of life."

Breton did not know that Maria’s interest in her cultural myths pre-dated her involvement with the Surrealists by over a decade. This can be seen in the works she made in the mid-to-late 1930s under the influence of Catherine Barjanski whom she studied with in Paris, and Oscar Jespers whom she studied with in Belgium. Though most of the sculptures Martins made before moving to America in 1939 are now lost, a visual record of these works is found in an unpublished photograph album that she assembled in the early 1940s documenting her early sculptures. Martins carved her early figures in wood from the subtropical jacaranda tree, which is native to Brazil. Jacaranda’s straight grain and relatively soft, knot-free properties made it ideal for sculpting. Martins chose this specific wood also to resonate with the Brazilian themes of her work. Her 1939 work "Macumba" references the underground Afro-Brazilian religion, imagery she frequently references in subsequent works.

=== Étant donnés ===
Martins had an affair with the artist Marcel Duchamp, which lasted for several years from 1946 onwards, ending with her departure for Brazil in 1951 and with his 1954 marriage to his second wife Alexina Duchamp. In 2009, members of Martins's family released letters written by Duchamp and Martins that substantiated previous claims that Martins was indeed the model for the nude figure in Duchamp's final masterpiece, the Étant donnés, as opposed to his wife Teeny. It is now widely acknowledged that Martins was the model for the reclining nude torso in Duchamp's installation piece and that his wife Alexina (Teeny) served only as the model for the figure's arms. A book about her relationship with Duchamp, Impossible: The Love Affair between Marcel DuChamps & Maria Martins and the Artwork It Inspired by Francis M. Naumann, is forthcoming from Abbeville Press in 2026.

On her return to Brazil in 1949, critics in Brazil did not favor her work, feeling it was non-traditional and too erotic. Martins helped to found the very first edition of the São Paulo Art Biennial. While in Brazil, she took part in the International Surrealist Exhibition in Paris 1959-1960, New York (1960–61) and São Paulo (1967). Martins leveraged her international connections to promote modern art in Brazil. She was a founding member of the Museum of Modern Art in Rio in 1952. Later in her life she returned to writing and published poetry and essays on Friedrich Nietzsche and China.

== Death ==
Martins died on 27 March 1973 in Rio de Janeiro.

== Public collections ==
Martins' work can be found in a number of public institutions, including:

- Museum of Modern Art
- Metropolitan Museum of Art
- Brooklyn Museum
- The Baltimore Museum of Art
