= The Bride Stripped Bare by Her Bachelors, Even =

Artwork by Marcel Duchamp

The Bride Stripped Bare by Her Bachelors, Even (The Large Glass)
- French: La mariée mise à nu par ses célibataires, même (Le Grand Verre) (French)
- Artist: Marcel Duchamp
- Year: 1915–1923
- Type: Oil, varnish, lead foil, lead wire, and dust on two glass panels
- Dimensions: 277.5 cm × 175.9 cm (109.25 in × 69.25 in)
- Location: Philadelphia Museum of Art, Philadelphia

The Bride Stripped Bare by Her Bachelors, Even (in French : La mariée mise à nu par ses célibataires, même), also called The Large Glass (in French : Le Grand Verre), is an artwork by Marcel Duchamp over 9 feet (2.7 m) tall and almost 6 feet (1.76m) wide. Duchamp worked on the piece from 1915 to 1923 in New York City, creating two panes of glass with materials such as lead foil, fuse wire, and dust. It combines chance procedures, plotted perspective studies, and laborious craftsmanship. Duchamp's ideas for The Large Glass began in 1912, and he made numerous notes and studies, as well as preliminary works for the piece. The notes reflect the creation of unique rules of physics and myth which describe the work.

The Bride Stripped Bare by Her Bachelors, Even is also the title given to The Green Box notes (1934), as Duchamp intended The Large Glass to be accompanied by a book in order to prevent purely visual responses to it. The notes describe that his "hilarious picture" is intended to depict the erotic encounter between the "Bride", in the upper panel, and her nine "Bachelors" gathered timidly below in an abundance of mysterious mechanical apparatus in the lower panel. The Large Glass was exhibited in 1926 at the Brooklyn Museum before it was broken during transport and intentionally left broken by Duchamp. He decided not to change the glass but to glue the pieces back together. It is now part of the permanent collection at the Philadelphia Museum of Art. Duchamp sanctioned replicas of The Large Glass, the first in 1961 for an exhibition at Moderna Museet in Stockholm and another in 1966 for the Tate Gallery in London. The third replica is in Komaba Museum, University of Tokyo.

== Visual analysis ==
The Large Glass consists of two glass panels, suspended vertically and measuring 109.25 in × 69.25 in (277.5 cm × 175.9 cm). The entire composition is shattered, but rests sandwiched between two pieces of intact glass set in a metal frame with wooden base. The top rectangle of glass is known as the Bride's Domain; the bottom piece is the Bachelors' Apparatus. It consists of many geometric shapes melding together to create a large mechanical assemblage. All forms on the glass are outlined with lead wire and filled in with earth tone oil paint. The colors range from pale grey to gold to dark brown and black. Some figures are bumpy and cloudy, and contain the dust left on them during the time which the unfinished work lay dormant, which seems to be an attempt at capturing the dynamic passage of time in a sedate work.

The Bride is a mechanical, almost insect-like, group of monochrome shaded geometric forms located along the left-hand side of the glass. She is connected to her halo, a cloudy form stretching across the top. Its outline and grey shading are starkly offset by the three undulating squares of unpainted glass evenly spaced over the central part of the composition. The Bride's solid, main rectangular form branches out into slender, tentacle-like projections. These include an inverted funnel capped by a half-moon shape, a series of shapes resembling a skull with two misplaced ears, and a long, proboscis-like extension stretching down almost as far as the horizon line between her domain and that of the bachelors. Her top-located domain is almost completely monochrome, with a wash of beige comparable to the cool colors of a cloudy sky.

The Bachelors' earthbound, lower domain, referred to by Duchamp as La Machine Célibataire (The Bachelor Machine), is a collection of much warmer, earthier colors of brown and golden tones. The Bachelors' Domain centers on the nine Malic Molds. These dark brown shapes have a central vertical line, some with horizontal ones across them. They resemble the empty carcasses of clothes hanging from a clothesline, much more than they do actual men. They are interconnected through a spider web of thin lines, tying them to the seven conical cylinders. The cylinders range in color, and move in stages from nearly transparent on the left side, to translucent in the middle, to almost opaque on the far right. The opaque ones have swirling dark brown and gold colors and are almost solid three-dimensional forms, whereas the translucent ones are more ghostly outlines. They are connected in a line from tip to base and form a half circle. This rainbow-like shape is impaled centrally by a pole which connects them to the chocolate grinder at the lower part of the glass, and to the X-shaped rods that dominate the top center of the Bachelors' Domain.

The chocolate grinder consists of three drum-like structures, arranged in even spacing around a circular platform. The structures are appropriately chocolate-brown in color, and are very textured with a series of ridges running around their outside and spiraling out from the center. There are three tiny legs that barely seem to support the entire structure.

The rods interconnect to form a large X, and look like they recede into space. One end is smooth and cylindrical, while the other tapers at the end and is capped with a sphere. The spherical ends are connected to two more rods that run vertically down to yet another machine. It is a contraption similar to a waterwheel with spokes of a bicycle wheel. This is tilted away from the viewer, almost to the point that it is indistinguishable. This in turn is placed on two elongated ovals, which are almost like runners. These support the wheel, along with the framework of a metal box that encases it and intersects with the Bachelors' "feet".

On the right-hand side of the Bachelors' Domain are four faint, circular images. The top one is a perfect circle. A little below that are three circular images tilted away from the viewer. The first has 12 spokes, each spoke consisting of three lines. The middle is made of six concentric circles. The bottom is a prickly looking circle with a small hole in the middle, consisting of outward spiraling lines.

The composition's most dominating feature is the series of spider web cracks, running diagonally from the top right to bottom left of the Bride's Domain, and in an almost figure eight from the top left to bottom right of the Bachelors' Domain forming flowery, flowing designs. Neither cracks nor paint disrupt the right, central plane, which is devoid of decoration, and around which the action of the art plays out. The cracks occurred when the piece was being moved from its first exhibition, and after effecting the repair, Duchamp decided he admired the cracks: an element of chance that enhanced what he had done intentionally, following the flow of energy in the work's composition.

The piece is placed in a gallery at the Philadelphia Museum of Art beside The Green Box, the selection of Duchamp's own notes on The Large Glass. It stands in front of a window, from which natural light creates a varying atmosphere depending on the time of day, the weather, and the season. It is also surrounded by his other works – both paintings and readymades– which form a background which the work otherwise is lacking. In this sense, this image of a frozen machine becomes extremely dynamic and engaging to the viewer.

== Duchamp's methods ==
I bought two plate-glass panes and started at the top, with the Bride. I worked at least a year on that. Then in 1916 or 1917 I worked on the bottom part, the Bachelors. It took so long because I could never work more than two hours a day. You see, it interested me but not enough to be eager to finish it. I'm lazy, don't forget that. Besides, I didn't have any intention to show it or sell it at that time. I was just doing it, that was my life. And when I wanted to work on it I did, and other times I would go out and enjoy America.

The Large Glass...was gradually assuming the mysterious aura of a famous work of art that hardly anyone had seen. Duchamp's efforts to finish it became more and more sporadic. For six months the Glass lay untouched in the studio, gathering a thick layer of dust which Duchamp then proceeded to use as a pigment, gluing the dust down with varnish to one part of the "bachelor machine" (the "sieves") and wiping the rest away. This gave him a colour that did not come from the tube... To arrive at the shapes of the "draught pistons" in the Bride's "Milky Way" (terms from Duchamp's own notes), he made use of the wind: he suspended a square of gauze in an open window, photographed it three times, and reproduced the wind-blown shapes at the top of the Glass. The placement of the Bachelors' nine "shots" (which never do reach the waiting Bride) was effected by dipping matches in wet paint and firing them from a toy cannon at the Glass. The forces of gravity, wind, and "personalized chance" were thus substituted for the workings of his own conscious hand, always in the spirit of hilarity that Duchamp once paraphrased as that "necessary and sufficient twinkling of the eye," and always with the same meticulous, painstaking attention to detail that a scientist might apply to a controlled nuclear experiment.

== Interpretation ==
Duchamp's art does not lend itself to simple interpretations, and The Large Glass is no exception; the notes and diagrams he produced in association with the project – ostensibly as a sort of guidebook – complicate the piece by, for example, describing elements that were not included in the final version as though they nevertheless exist, and "explaining" the whole assembly in stream-of-consciousness prose thick with word play and jokes. Dubbed The Green Box, this 'explanatory work' has been described as "No less ambiguously or freely interpretable than [The Large Glass] itself..."

Linda Dalrymple Henderson picks up on Duchamp's idea of inventing a "playful physics" and traces a quirky Victorian physics out of the notes and The Large Glass itself; numerous mathematical and philosophical systems have been read out of (or perhaps into) its structures.

Most critics, however, read the piece as an exploration of male and female desire as they complicate each other. One critic, for example, describes the basic layout as follows: "The Large Glass has been called a love machine, but it is actually a machine of suffering. Its upper and lower realms are separated from each other forever by a horizon designated as the 'bride's clothes'. The bride is hanging, perhaps from a rope, in an isolated cage, or crucified. The bachelors remain below, left only with the possibility of churning, agonized masturbation."

== Boxes ==
Over the course of his life, Duchamp released three boxes related to The Large Glass, containing facsimiles of notes, photographs, and drawings.

=== The Box of 1914 ===
The Box of 1914 brings together facsimiles of the first sketches and preparatory notes for The Bride Stripped Bare by Her Bachelors, Even, reproduced on 13 silver glass plates; there are three copies, five copies according to others. The container for the box was a commercial cardboard box for photographic plates.

In an interview with Pierre Cabanne, Duchamp explained:

For the "Box" of 1913-1914, it's different. I didn't have the idea of a box as much as just notes. I thought I could collect, in an album like the Saint-Etienne catalogue, some calculations, some reflections, without relating them. Sometimes they're torn pieces of paper... I wanted that album to go with the "Glass" and to be consulted when seeing the "Glass" because, as I see it, it must not be "looked at" in the aesthetic sense of the word. One must consult the book, and see the two together. The conjunction of the two things entirely removes the retinal aspect that I don't like. It was very logical.

— Dialogues with Marcel Duchamp

The 1914 box contains facsimile notes and three photographs of a piece of string mounted on canvas and a note that led to the work: 3 Standard Stoppages. It also contains a single drawing of a cyclist riding uphill titled Avoir l'apprenti du soleil (To Have the Apprentice in the Sun).

One of the notes in the box makes an early reference to Duchamp's last work: Étant donnés, "Étant donné que ....; si je suppose que je sois souffrant beaucoup ...."

Copies of the box are held by the Centre Georges Pompidou, the Philadelphia Museum of Art, Musee Maillol in Paris, and the Art Institute of Chicago. Jacques Villon once owned a fifth copy, which is lost.

=== The Green Box ===
The Green Box and its contents

In 1934, Duchamp made a new box that contained new preparatory notes for The Large Glass, a collection of eight years of ideas, reflections, thoughts; 93 documents in total (written notes, drawings, photographs).

Each of those was lithographed and printed on paper that was similar to the paper he used in his preparations. Printed in an edition of 320 (with 20 containing an original work numbered I to XX; a series called the "luxury edition"), the final work was nicknamed La Boîte verte (The Green Box) and bears the inscription "The Bride Stripped Bare by Her Bachelors, Even" in punched-out caps. The publisher is listed as Rrose Sélavy (Duchamp's alter ego whose name is a pun on "Eros, c'est la vie" (Eros is life)). Through André Breton, Duchamp explained in 1932 that he intended to give the notes a public reading. (Note: In This Quarter (Vol V, No1) of September first published notes by Duchamp two years before the Green Box with a preface by André Breton who calls the notes calls the notes an "from a large, unpublished collection [...] intended to accompany and explain (as might an ideal exhibition catalogue) the 'verre' (painting on clear glass) known as The Bride Stripped Bare By Her Own Bachelors.")

Copies of The Green Box are held by museums including Tate Britain, the Metropolitan Museum of Art, the Philadelphia Museum of Art, the Museum of Modern Art, and the Whitney Museum.

=== The White Box ===
In 1966, Cordier & Ekstrom edited a new edition, À l'infinitif (In the infinitive) also called The White Box, gathering new unpublished notes from the period 1912 – 1920 in an edition of 150. The box contains 79 facsimiles of notes from 1914 – 23 in a Plexiglas case of 33.3 x 29 x 3.8 cm.

== See also ==
- List of works by Marcel Duchamp

== Video ==
- Marcel Duchamp, The Large Glass (video) | Khan Academy
