= David Tudor =

American pianist and composer (1926–1996)

- Tudor, c. 1950
- Born: January 20, 1926; Philadelphia, Pennsylvania, U.S.
- Died: August 13, 1996 (aged 70); Tomkins Cove, New York, U.S.
- Occupations: Pianist; Composer; Academic teacher
- Organizations: National Institute of Design; Merce Cunningham Dance Company

David Eugene Tudor (January 20, 1926 – August 13, 1996) was an American pianist and composer of experimental music. After playing the U.S. premiere of the Piano Sonata No. 2 by Pierre Boulez in 1950, he premiered works by New York School composers including Morton Feldman and especially John Cage written for him; Karlheinz Stockhausen dedicated a work to him, reflecting his similar degree of integration with the Darmstadt School. He turned to composing, including many projects for the Merce Cunningham Dance Company. After Cage's death in 1992, he succeeded him as music director of the Merce Cunningham Dance Company.

== Life and career ==
Tudor was born in Philadelphia, Pennsylvania, on January 20, 1926. Tudor began his career as an organist, first in 1943 at Trinity Church in Swarthmore, Pennsylvania, then also at Swarthmore College from 1945 to 1947. He began piano studies with Irma Wolpe at the College, later accompanied by composition studies with her husband Stefan Wolpe. After World War II, he attended, like many other Americans interested in new culture, the summer schools at Black Mountain College in Black Mountain, North Carolina. Artists meeting there included Josef Albers, John Cage, Remy Charlip, Merce Cunningham, Buckminster Fuller, Willem and Elaine de Kooning and Robert Rauschenberg. The dance theatre of Cage and Cunningham formed there in the early 1950s, with aesthetics including live dance and live music, with Tudor as the musical part.

Tudor became known as one of the era's leading performers of avant-garde piano music. He gave the first American performance of the Piano Sonata No. 2 by Pierre Boulez in 1950, and a European tour in 1954 greatly enhanced his reputation. Karlheinz Stockhausen dedicated his Klavierstück VI (1955) to Tudor. Tudor also gave early performances of works by Morton Feldman, Earle Brown, Christian Wolff, and La Monte Young. The composer most associated with Tudor was Cage; he gave the premieres of Cage's Music of Changes, Concert For Piano and Orchestra, and 4' 33". Cage said that many of his pieces were written either specifically for Tudor to perform or with him in mind, once stating that "what you had to do was to make a situation that would interest him. That was the role he played." The two worked closely together on many of Cage's works for piano and electroacoustic works, including for the Smithsonian Folkways album Indeterminacy: New Aspect of Form in Instrumental and Electronic Music (1959). Tudor also performs on several recordings of Cage's music, including the Mainstream record of Cartridge Music, the recording on Columbia Records of Variations II, and the two Everest records of Variations IV.

Tudor taught at the Darmstädter Ferienkurse from 1956 to 1961, after which he reduced his activities as a pianist to concentrate on composing. He wrote mostly electronic works, many commissioned for the Merce Cunningham Dance Company. His homemade musical circuits are considered landmarks in live electronic music and electrical instrument building as a form of composition. One piece, Reunion (1968), written jointly with Lowell Cross, features a chess game where each move triggers a lighting effect or projection. At the premiere, the game was played between Cage and Marcel Duchamp; Reunion is erroneously attributed to Cage in James Pritchett's book The Music Of John Cage. Tudor's Rain Forest is a sound installation created from constructed sculpture and everyday objects such as a metal barrel, a vintage computer disk, and plastic tubing which served as a musical accompaniment. (David Tudor and Composers Inside Electronics Inc.: Rain forest V (variation 1))

In 1969, Tudor set up the first electronic music studio in India at the National Institute of Design in Ahmedabad.

Upon Cage's death in 1992, Tudor took over as music director of the Merce Cunningham Dance Company. He received a Foundation for Contemporary Arts John Cage Award in 1992. Among works created for the company, Tudor composed Soundings: Ocean Diary (1994), the electronic component of Ocean, which was conceived by Cage and Cunningham, with choreography by Cunningham, orchestral music by Andrew Culver and design by Marsha Skinner.

Tudor died after a series of strokes in Tomkins Cove, New York, at the age of 70.

== Work ==
=== Piano realizations ===
From 1951 until the late 1960s, Tudor regularly performed the indeterminate work of John Cage. Throughout this time, "all of the music [Cage] composed", John Holzaepfel contends, "was written with one person [Tudor] in mind". Winter Music (1957), for example, comprises a score of twenty pages, that each contain from one to 61 cluster-chords per page, with the performer deciding which of these to play. In his realizations of these scores, Tudor "pin[ned] them down like butterflies", creating fixed realizations that he notated and played consistently from concert to concert. As Martin Iddon explains: "Tudor's practice was, broadly, to create a single realisation and then to use that version of the piece in all subsequent recordings". Despite the significant role Tudor had in the creative act, "during his years as a pianist, Tudor never considered himself as a composer, or even a co-composer, of the music he played".

According to Benjamin Piekut (drawing from the work of Bruno Latour), these fixed realizations are examples of "distributed authorship", where "the conception, meaning and sound-world of a given composition is shared across multiple subjectivities". The conception and meaning of a work that Cage created with Tudor in mind is thus shared across the subjectivities of these two actors; similarly, the output 'sound-world' is shared in that Tudor's function in realizing the score is decision making based on Cage's score, which does not present a coherent sound-world on its own. Piekut aligns this creative distribution with Cage's Buddhist worldview.

=== Sea Tails ===
Tudor was the composer for the 1983 video installation Sea Tails with video artist Molly Davies and artist Jackie Matisse. Matisse created four kites which Davies filmed being 'flown' underwater (dragged behind a boat) for eight days, and Tudor simultaneously recorded sound below and above deck which was later layered, mixed, and rerecorded onto three separate tapes. The combined work was first presented at the Centre Pompidou in Paris in 1983 and later at the Getty Center in Los Angeles in 2004.

== Recordings and television ==
Some of Tudor's own music as well as his performances of other composers' works were recorded. Tudor can also be seen and heard playing music of Leo Ornstein and Henry Cowell on Episode 12 of Aaron Copland's WNET series Music in the Twenties.
