= Artists in Exile =

1942 New York art exhibition

The Artists in Exile exhibition was a seminal art show held from March 3 to 28, 1942, organized by Pierre Matisse at the Pierre Matisse Gallery in New York City.

== Participants ==
The artists featured in the exhibition were (in alphabetical order):

- Amédée Ozenfant
- André Breton
- André Masson
- Eugene Berman
- Fernand Léger
- Jacques Lipchitz
- Kurt Seligmann
- Marc Chagall
- Max Ernst
- Ossip Zadkine
- Pavel Tchelitchew
- Piet Mondrian
- Roberto Matta
- Yves Tanguy
