= Rotary Demisphere (Precision Optics) =

Sculpture by Marcel Duchamp

Rotative demisphère (Optique de précision)
- Rotary Demisphere (Precision Optics) (English)
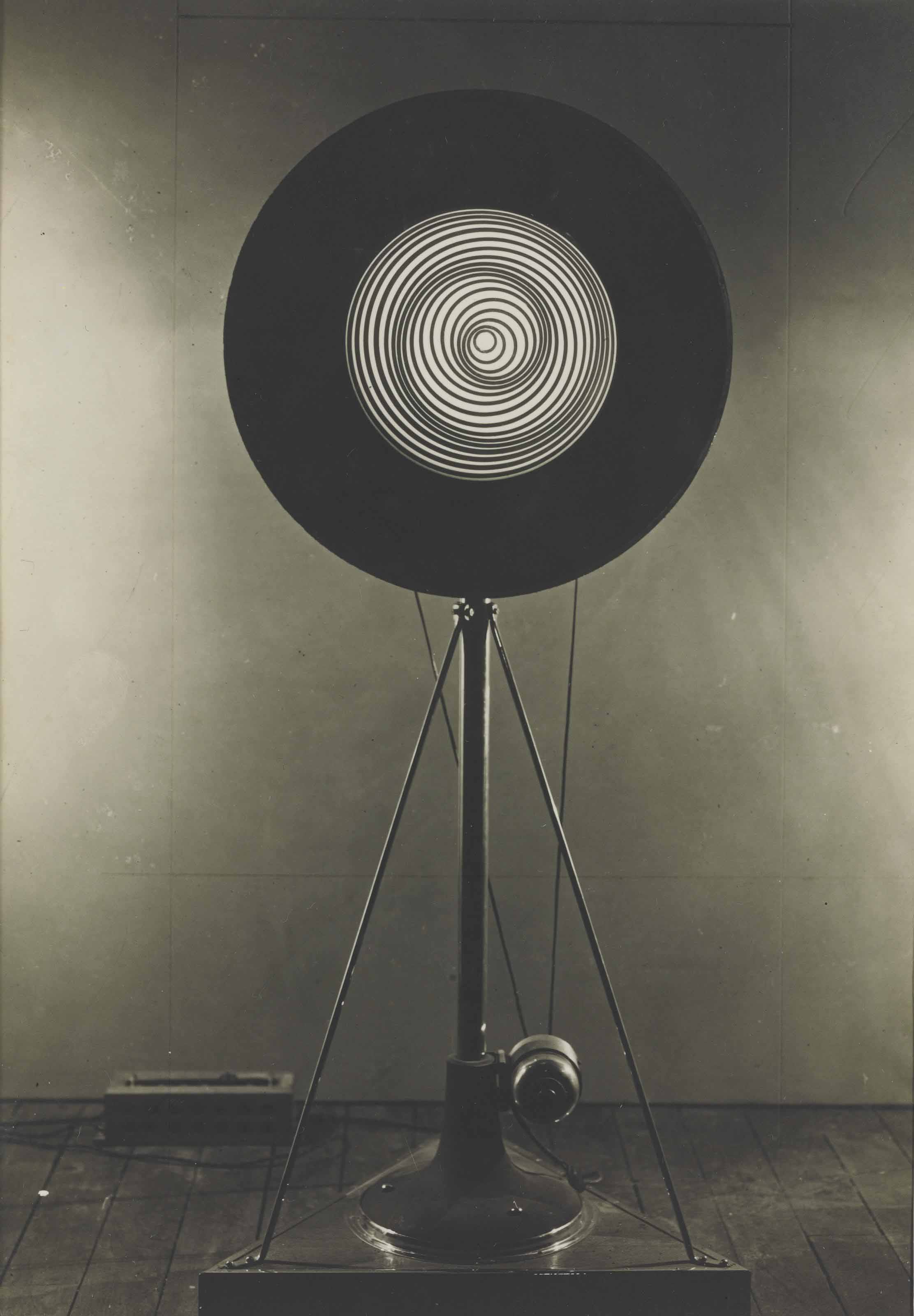
- photographed by Man Ray
- Artist: Marcel Duchamp
- Year: 1925
- Medium: Wood, paint, velvet, copper, plexiglass, steel
- Movement: Dada
- Dimensions: 148.6 cm × 64.2 cm × 60.9 cm (58.5 in × 25.3 in × 24.0 in)
- Location: Museum of Modern Art

Rotary Demisphere (Precision Optics) is a 1925 kinetic sculpture by Marcel Duchamp.

The work consists of a globe cut in half and painted with concentric circles osculating in a spiral, mounted on velvet in a copper and plexiglass dome, and fitted on a metal stand with a flywheel, pulley, and electric motor. When powered on, the dome spins and the spiral appears to pulsate.

Duchamp built Rotary Demisphere shortly after returning to Europe from the United States intending to pursue a career not as an artist but a professional chess player, first in Brussels and then Paris. He took a part-time job as "librarian and artistic advisor" to dressmaker and art collector Jacques Doucet, who purchased some of Duchamp's work on the advice of friend and writer André Breton; this working relationship eventually led Doucet to commission Rotary Demisphere.

Rotary Demisphere is one of several experiments the artist undertook with motorized spiraling optical illusions. His first design, titled Rotating glass blades, precision optics (French: Rotative plaques verre, optique de précision), featured fan-like glass blades, one of which "nearly decapitated" Man Ray when it flew off during operation. Rotary Demisphere bears most similarity to his "rotoreliefs", which feature prominently in his 1926 short film Anemic Cinema. Like Anemic Cinema, Rotary Demisphere features nonsensical wordplay, another of Duchamp's trademarks, engraved onto its copper mounting ring: "Rrose Sélavy et moi esquivons les ecchymoses des esquimaux aux mots exquis" (French: Rrose Sélavy and I dodge the Eskimos’ bruises with exquisite words). Rrose Sélavy is Duchamp's pseudonym, sometimes described as his alter ego, who appears in many of Duchamp's works.

Rotary Demisphere (Precision Optics) is currently held by the Museum of Modern Art of New York, which has retrofitted the sculpture with a modern motor and powers it on for five minutes at a time twice daily. A photograph of the sculpture by Man Ray sold at auction in 2017 for US$27,500.
