= Jackie Matisse =

French artist (1931–2021)

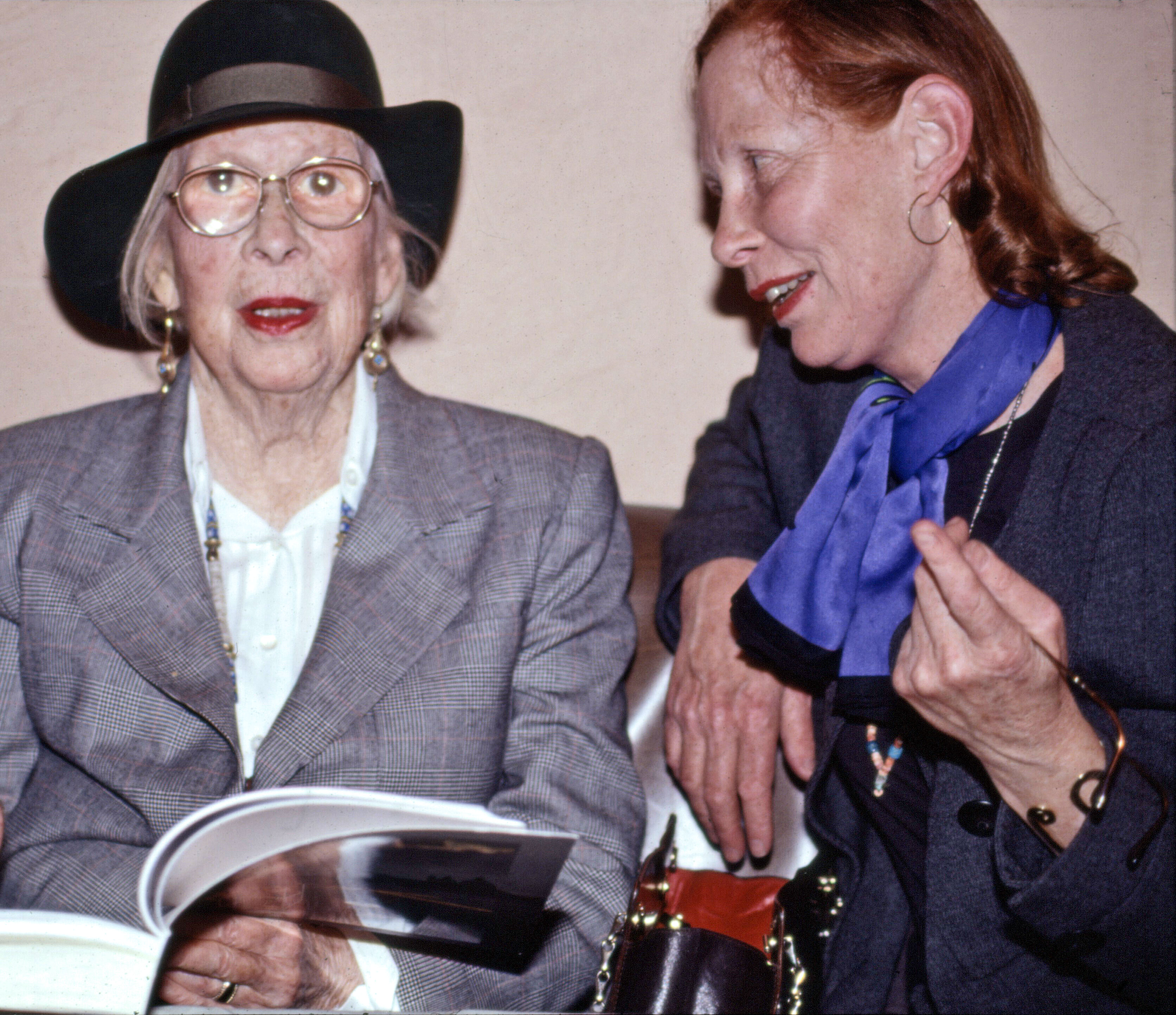
Jackie Matisse (on the right) with her mother Alexina Duchamp

Jackie Matisse (1931 – 17 May 2021), also known as Jacqueline Matisse Monnier, was a French artist. She was born in Neuilly-sur-Seine, the eldest of the three children of Pierre Matisse and Alexina Duchamp. For a time she was married to the French banker, Bernard Monnier.

Matisse has been described as "ever the kiteflying [creating] pioneer," "renowned for her kites." She also worked in supercomputing and virtual reality.

She befriended the artist Niki de Saint Phalle at school and they were lifelong friends.

One example of her work is her collaboration with David Tudor and Molly Davies, Sea Tails. An early supporter of Merce Cunningham, she served on the board of directors of the Cunningham Dance Foundation from 2004 to 2012.

She died on 17 May 2021, at the age of 90.
