= Anemic Cinema =

1926 film

- French: Anémic Cinéma
- Directed by: Marcel Duchamp
- Release date: 1929
- Running time: 7 minutes
- Country: France

Anemic Cinema or Anémic Cinéma is a 1926 Dada/surrealist French experimental film by Marcel Duchamp (credited to his alter ego, Rrose Sélavy), made in collaboration with Man Ray and Marc Allégret.

The seven-minute film is composed of alternating static camera shots of spinning animated drawings disks—which Duchamp called Rotoreliefs—inscribed with puns and alliterations in French. The text, which spirals in a counterclockwise motion, suggests erotic scenarios and the words, if read aloud, produce repetitive patterns of sounds that lead to scatological or obscene associations in reference to pulsating human sexual activity. To make Anémic Cinéma, Duchamp filmed painted designs he made on flat cardboard circles while they spun on a phonograph turntable. When spinning, the flat disks appeared three-dimensional.

The film premiered in a private screening in Paris in August 1926 and was acquired by MoMA in 1938, the first Duchamp work to enter a museum.

Duchamp had a commercial printer run off 500 sets of six of the designs and set up a booth at a 1935 Paris inventors' show to sell them. The venture was a financial disaster, but some optical scientists thought they might be of use in restoring three-dimensional sight to people with one eye.

== History ==
Anemic Cinema cover of The Little Review, 1925

Duchamp first showed Anemic Cinema at a private screening for friends in Paris on 30 August 1926. He brought the film on a trip to New York later that year, where he held another private screening at the Fifth Avenue Playhouse on 22 December 1926, and another at Miles Studio in early 1927.

Artist Hans Richter acquired a print of the film and gave it its public debut in 1929, screening it at the Film und Foto exhibition in Stuttgart. New York art dealer Julien Levy obtained another print and screened it at his gallery in 1936 and 1937. The Museum of Modern Art (MoMA) acquired a print from Duchamp in 1938; this was the first of Duchamp's works to enter a museum collection.

The film gained recognition in the 1930s and 1940s as Richter's copy circulated to film clubs in Europe, and MoMA's copy was lent to museums and universities around North America.

== Rotoreliefs texts ==
The texts on the Rotoreliefs, in French, are the following:

- "Bains de gros thé pour grains de beauté sans trop de bengué." (Bengay was a French analgesic rub invented by Dr. Jules Bengué)
- L'enfant qui tète est un souffleur de chair chaude et n'aime pas le chou-fleur de serre-chaude. (The suckling child is a hot flesh blower and does not like hothouse cauliflower.)
- Si je te donne un sou, me donneras-tu une paire de ciseaux ? (If I give you a penny, will you give me a pair of scissors?)
- On demande des moustiques domestiques (demi-stock) pour la cure d'azote sur la Côte d'Azur. (Domestic mosquitoes (half-stock) are requested for the nitrogen treatment on the French Riviera.)
- Inceste ou passion de famille, à coups trop tirés. (Incest or family passion, with blows too drawn.)
- Esquivons les ecchymoses des Esquimaux aux mots exquis. (Let’s avoid the bruises of the Eskimos with exquisite words.)
- Avez-vous déjà mis la moëlle de l'épée dans le poêle de l'aimée ? (Have you ever put the sword's pith into your beloved's stove?)
- Parmi nos articles de quincaillerie paresseuse, nous recommandons le robinet qui s'arrête de couler quand on ne l'écoute pas. (Among our lazy hardware items, we recommend the faucet that stops dripping when you're not listening to it.)
- L'aspirant habite Javel et moi j'avais l'habite en spirale. (The vacuum cleaner lives in Javel, and I used to live in a spiral.)

== See also ==
- List of works by Marcel Duchamp
- Rotary Demisphere (Precision Optics)
- 8 × 8: A Chess Sonata in 8 Movements

== Notes and references ==
Notes

References

- Kauffman, Alexander (2017a). "The Anemic Cinemas of Marcel Duchamp". The Art Bulletin. 99 (1): 128–159. doi:10.1080/00043079.2017.1249255. JSTOR 44973139.
- Kauffman, Alexander (2017b). "Faire Un Cinéma": Marcel Duchamp And The Moving Image (PhD). University of Pennsylvania. Archived from the original on 6 December 2019.
