= Molly Davies (videographer) =

Video artist

Molly Davies is a videographer or video artist. She has collaborated with John Cage, David Tudor, Takehisa Kosugi, Lou Harrison, Michael Nyman, Alvin Curran, Fred Frith, Suzushi Hanayagi, Sage Cowles, Polly Motley, Jackie Matisse, and Anne Carson.

Examples of her work include her collaboration with David Tudor and Jackie Matisse, Sea Tails.

She is on the board of directors of the non-profit, multi-disciplinary art and performance space, The Kitchen.

Her works in the field of film, multimedia and video installations have been presented at festivals and museums around the world.
