= Sea Tails =

Sea Tails (1983) is a video installation created as a collaboration between video artist Molly Davies, French artist Jackie Matisse, and composer David Tudor.

Matisse created four various kites, Davies filmed them being 'flown' underwater (drug behind a boat in the Bahamas near Nassau) for eight days, and Tudor simultaneously recorded sound below and above deck, later layered, mixed, and rerecorded the sounds onto three separate tapes. This was all combined as a six-monitor (or three, or rather three-channel video played on six monitors), three-channel video installation premiered at the Pompidou Center in 1983 and later exhibited at the Getty Center in 2004.
