= Étant donnés =

Artwork by Marcel Duchamp

- Given: 1. The Waterfall, 2. The Illuminating Gas (English), Étant donnés: 1° la chute d'eau / 2° le gaz d'éclairage (French)
- Artist: Marcel Duchamp
- Year: 1946–1966
- Type: Assemblage
- Location: Philadelphia Museum of Art, Philadelphia

Étant donnés (Given: 1. The Waterfall, 2. The Illuminating Gas, French: Étant donnés: 1° la chute d'eau / 2° le gaz d'éclairage) is a 1966 assemblage by Marcel Duchamp. It was his last major artwork, surprising viewers and critics who had widely believed he had given up art; he was previously pursuing competitive chess which he had been playing for almost 25 years. The artwork is a tableau, visible only through a pair of peepholes—one for each eye—in a wooden door, of a nude woman lying on her back on a hill with her face hidden, legs spread, holding a gas lamp in the air in one hand against a landscape backdrop.

Duchamp worked in secrecy on the artwork from 1946 to 1966 in his Greenwich Village studio. It is composed of an old wooden door, nails, bricks, brass, aluminium sheet, steel binder clips, velvet, leaves, twigs, a female form made of parchment, hair, glass, plastic clothespins, oil paint, linoleum, an assortment of lights, a landscape composed of hand-painted and photographed elements and an electric motor housed in a cookie tin which rotates a perforated disc to create a waterfall effect. The Brazilian sculptor Maria Martins, who had Duchamp as a lover from 1942 to 1949, served as the model for the female figure in the piece, and his second wife, Alexina (Teeny), served as the model for the figure's arm. Duchamp prepared a "Manual of Instructions" in a 4-ring binder explaining and illustrating how to assemble and disassemble the piece.

Anne d'Harnoncourt, a young curator at the Philadelphia Museum of Art and later its director, orchestrated the acquisition and transfer of the piece to Philadelphia. According to the artist's wishes that the work be installed and viewed after his death, Duchamp's widow Alexina Duchamp and his step-son Paul Matisse installed the work and made it available to the public at the Philadelphia Museum of Art in 1969, a year after Duchamp's death.

== See also ==
- List of works by Marcel Duchamp
