= Alexina Duchamp =

Art agent and wife of artists Pierre Matisse and Marcel Duchamp (1906-1995)

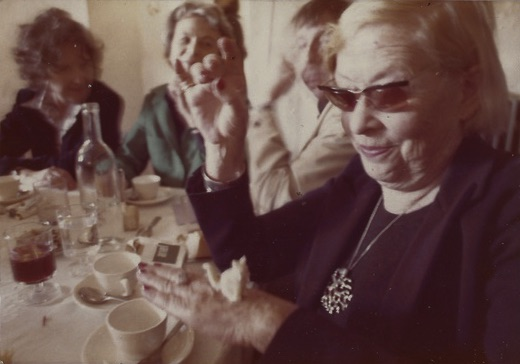
Duchamp photographed by Keith Milow at a party in the south of France in the 1970s

Alexina "Teeny" Duchamp (née Sattler; January 6, 1906 – December 20, 1995) was the wife of Pierre Matisse (artist Henri Matisse's son), and the second wife of artist and chess player Marcel Duchamp.

== Early life ==
Alexina Sattler was born in Cincinnati, Ohio in 1906. The youngest daughter of prominent surgeon Robert Sattler, she was nicknamed "Teeny" by her mother Agnes Mitchell because of her low birth weight.

== Paris and marriage to Pierre Matisse ==
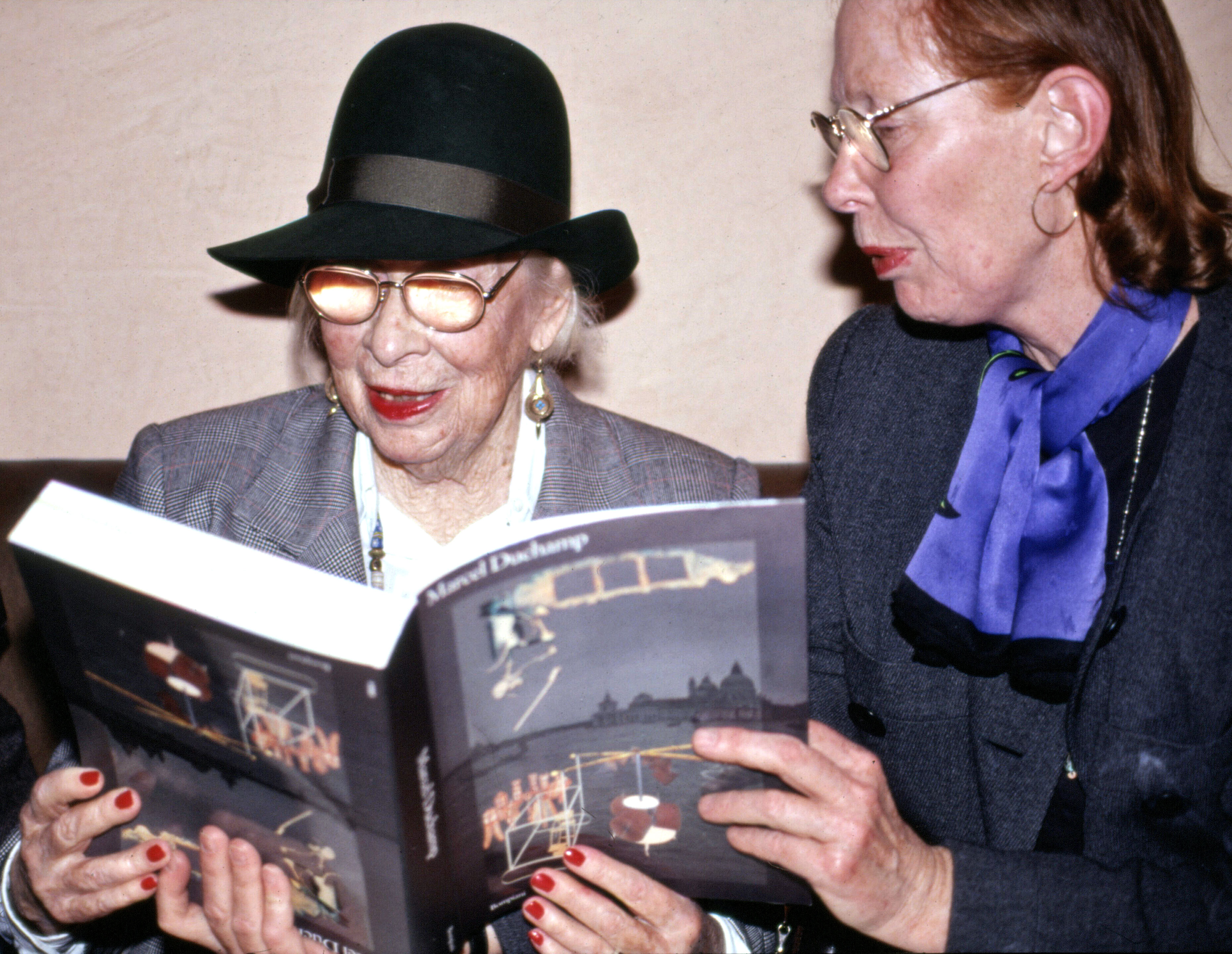
Duchamp with Jackie Matisse in 1993

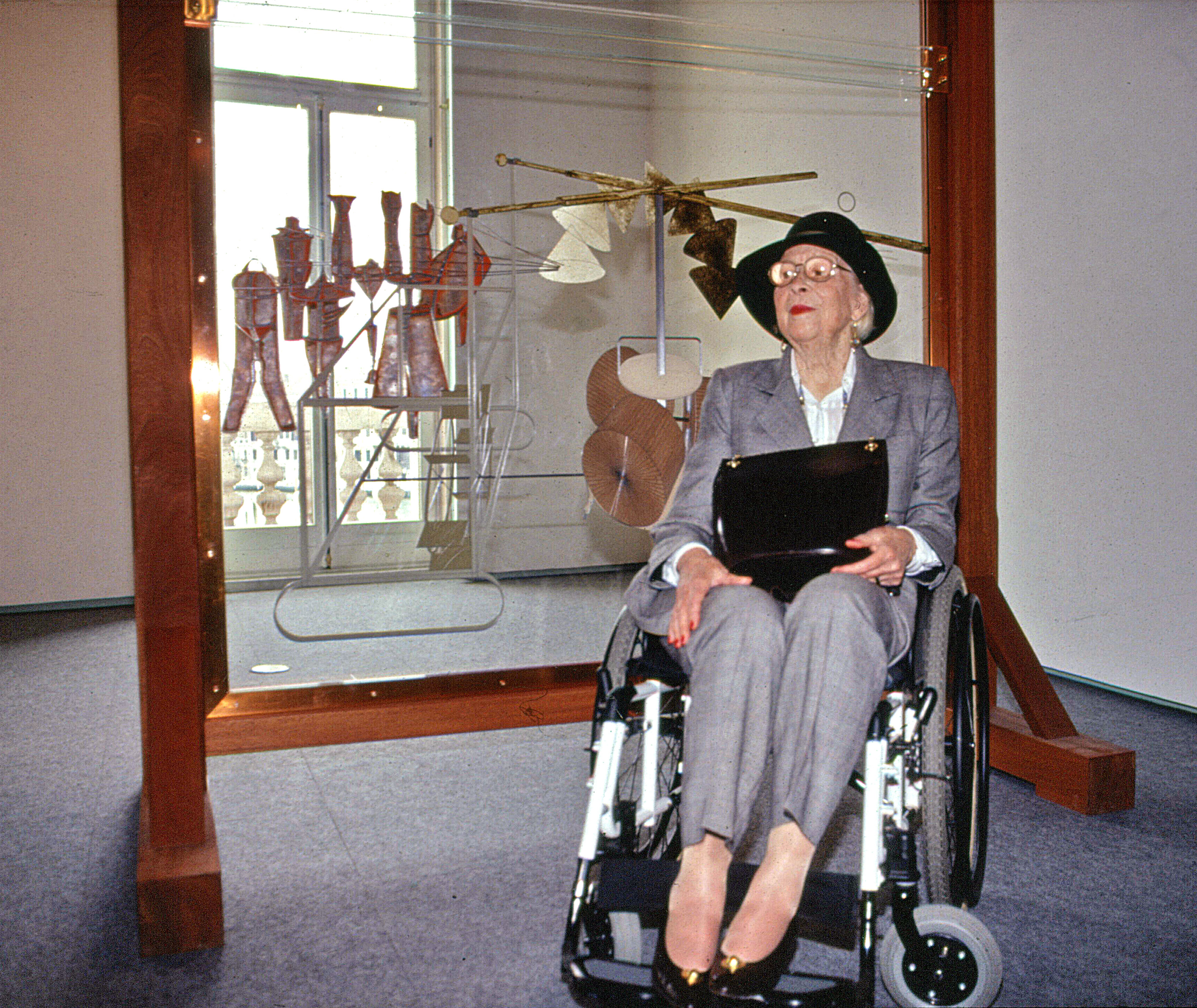
Duchamp at Palazzo Grassi in Venice in 1993

Sattler at first thought of becoming an artist and went to Paris in 1921, where for a time she studied sculpture with Constantin Brâncuși at the Académie de la Grande Chaumière in Paris. She first met Marcel Duchamp in 1923 at a ball given in her honor by American sculptor Mariette Benedict Mills, the mother of a close friend. In 1929 Teeny married Pierre Matisse, an art dealer and the youngest son of Fauve artist Henri Matisse. They had three children: Jacqueline, Paul, and Peter. Throughout 1938, Henri Matisse made a series of portrait sketches of Alexina. When her husband was mobilized in Paris at the outbreak of World War II, she ran his gallery for some months. In 1949 Pierre and Teeny separated due to Pierre's infidelity with Patricia Kane Matta, the former wife of surrealist painter Roberto Matta. She received many important paintings in the subsequent divorce settlement.

She worked for a time as an agent and broker for artists such as Brâncuși and Joan Miró.

== New York and marriage to Marcel Duchamp ==
In the autumn of 1951 she was invited by Dorothea Tanning to go on a weekend trip in Hunterdon County. It was on that trip that she once again met Duchamp, and romance developed shortly thereafter. They were both avid chess players. Teeny and Duchamp married in New York City on January 16, 1954. They lived in New York and in Paris; around 1958, the couple began spending summers in Cadaqués, Spain, on the Costa Brava. They were together until his death in 1968. Following Duchamp's death, Alexina moved to Villiers-sous-Grez, near Paris, where she assembled an archive of photographs and other material documenting the life and work of her late husband. She maintained a close friendship with many of Duchamp's friends, including Jasper Johns, Richard Hamilton, composer John Cage, Gianfranco Baruchello, and choreographer Merce Cunningham. Alexander Calder presented her with individually designed jewelry. She also served as an honorary trustee of the Philadelphia Museum of Art, which has the largest collection of Duchamp's work.

After the death of her husband Marcel Duchamp in 1968, Alexina "Teeny" Duchamp collaborated with her son - and Duchamp's stepson - Paul Matisse and curator Anne d'Harnoncourt to oversee the posthumous installation of Duchamp's artwork "Étant donnés" at the Philadelphia Museum of Art.

== Reading ==
- Tomkins, Calvin, Duchamp: A Biography. Henry Holt and Company, Inc., 1996. ISBN 0-8050-5789-7
- Baruchello, Gianfranco & Martin, Henry, Why Duchamp: An Essay on Aesthetic Impact, McPherson, 1985, ISBN 9780914232735
