= Pierre Matisse =

French-American art dealer

Pierre Matisse (June 13, 1900 – August 10, 1989) was a French and American art dealer active in New York City. He was the youngest child of French painter Henri Matisse.

== Background and early years ==
Pierre Matisse was born in Bohain-en-Vermandois in northern France on June 13, 1900. He exhibited an early interest in the art market, and took a job at the prestigious Galerie Barbazanges-Hodebert in Paris. In 1924, Pierre settled in New York, where he began a distinguished career of 65 years as an art dealer.

== Pierre Matisse Gallery ==
In 1931, Matisse opened his own gallery in the Fuller Building at 41 East 57th Street in New York City. The Pierre Matisse Gallery, which existed until his death in 1989, became an influential part of the Modern Art movement in America. Matisse represented and exhibited many European artists and a few Americans and Canadians in New York, often for the first time. Matisse exhibited Joan Miró, Marc Chagall, Alberto Giacometti, Jean Dubuffet, André Derain, Yves Tanguy, Le Corbusier, Paul Delvaux, Wifredo Lam, Jean-Paul Riopelle, Balthus, Leonora Carrington, Zao Wou Ki, Sam Francis, and Simon Hantaï; sculptors Theodore Roszak, Raymond Mason, and Reg Butler; and several other important artists, including his father. His art sales included ancient wares, such as the 1937 sale of an ancient Olmec statuette to the Wadsworth Atheneum in Hartford, Connecticut.

An exhibit at the Musée Matisse Nice highlighted Matisse’s career as a gallerist in its exhibit Pierre Matisse, an Art Dealer in New York (on display 11 June 2021 to 4 October 2021) and the gallery's role in promoting modern art in the United States.

== Personal life ==
Matisse was married three times. His first marriage, to Alexina "Teeny" Sattler (later Alexina Duchamp), resulted in the birth of three children: Paul, a painter/inventor; Jacqueline, and Peter. In 1949 the couple separated and Matisse married Patricia Kane Matta, the former wife of Chilean surrealist painter Roberto Matta. They were married until her death in 1972. In 1974, Matisse married Countess Maria-Gaetana "Tana" Matisse, the daughter of German diplomat Count Karl von Spreti. They remained married until his death on August 10, 1989, in Monaco. He was interred in Saint-Jean-Cap-Ferrat, on the French Riviera.

== Sources ==
- Hilary Spurling, The Unknown Matisse: A Life of Henri Matisse, Vol. 1, 1869–1908. London, Hamish Hamilton Ltd, 1998. ISBN 0-679-43428-3.
- Hilary Spurling, Matisse the Master: A Life of Henri Matisse, Vol. 2, The Conquest of Colour 1909–1954. London, Hamish Hamilton Ltd, 2005. ISBN 0-241-13339-4.
- John Russell, Matisse, Father & Son, published by Harry N. Abrams, NYC. Copyright John Russell 1999. ISBN 0-8109-4378-6
- Claudine Grammont (dir.), texts by Fabrice Flahutez, Marianne Jakobi, et al., Pierre Matisse, un marchand d’art à New York, Nice, Musée Matisse, Paris, Bernard Chauveau Édition, 2021. ISBN 978-2-36306-304-5
- Isabelle Monod-Fontaine, Claude Laugier (dir.), Dation Pierre Matisse, Paris : Musée national d'art moderne/Centre Georges Pompidou, 1992.
- Sabine Rewald, Magdalena Dabrowski, The American Matisse. The dealer, his artists, his collection. The Pierre and Maria-Gaetana Matisse Collection, New York City : Metropolitan Museum of Art/Yale University Press, 2009.
