= List of found objects =

This list of found objects is a list of notable artworks, by artist, which are found objects (or are composed of found objects). These are each followed by a description of the "found" components.

- Louis Hirshman

Albert Einstein (1940) Caricature using mop hair, brush for nose and mustache, abacas chest. Gifted to the Philadelphia Museum of Art after Hirshman's death in 1986.
Adolf Hitler (1937) Caricature using gestapo glove hair, painter's brush nose and mustache, dust pan of manure for chest.
Groucho Marx (1937) Caricature using black gloves for hair, spools of thread for eyebrows, shoehorn nose, bow tie nose.

- Saâdane Afif

Fountain Archive (2008-)

- Ron Arad

Rover chair

- Marcel Duchamp (Recent research has suggested that Duchamp's readymade artworks may have been custom-made impostors. However, there are accounts of Walter Arensberg and Joseph Stella being with Duchamp when he purchased the original Fountain at J. L. Mott Iron Works.)

Apolinère Enameled (1916), bed frame
Bicycle Wheel (1913)
Bottle Rack (1914)
Comb (1916)
In advance of the broken arm (1915), snow shovel
Fountain (1917), urinal
Pulled at 4 pins (1915), chimney ventilator
Trap (1917), coatrack

- Michael Craig-Martin

An Oak Tree

- Picasso

Chèvre, ceramic pottery shards, wicker basket, palm leaf, metal bits
Guenon et son petit (1951) [Baboon and Young], two toy cars, pottery jar, pitcher and bowl handles, automobile spring
Glass of Absinthe, silver straining spoon
Tête de taureau (1942), bicycle seat and handlebars

- Man Ray (worked closely with Duchamp)

The Gift (Le Cadeau in French) (1921), iron with fourteen nails glued to its sole
The enigma of Isidore Ducasse (1920, reconstructed 1971), an unseen object (a sewing machine) wrapped in cloth and tied with cord
Object to Be Destroyed (1923-1957) and Indestructible Object (1958), metronome(s) with a photograph of an eye attached to its swinging arm
