= Bergen Assembly 2022 =

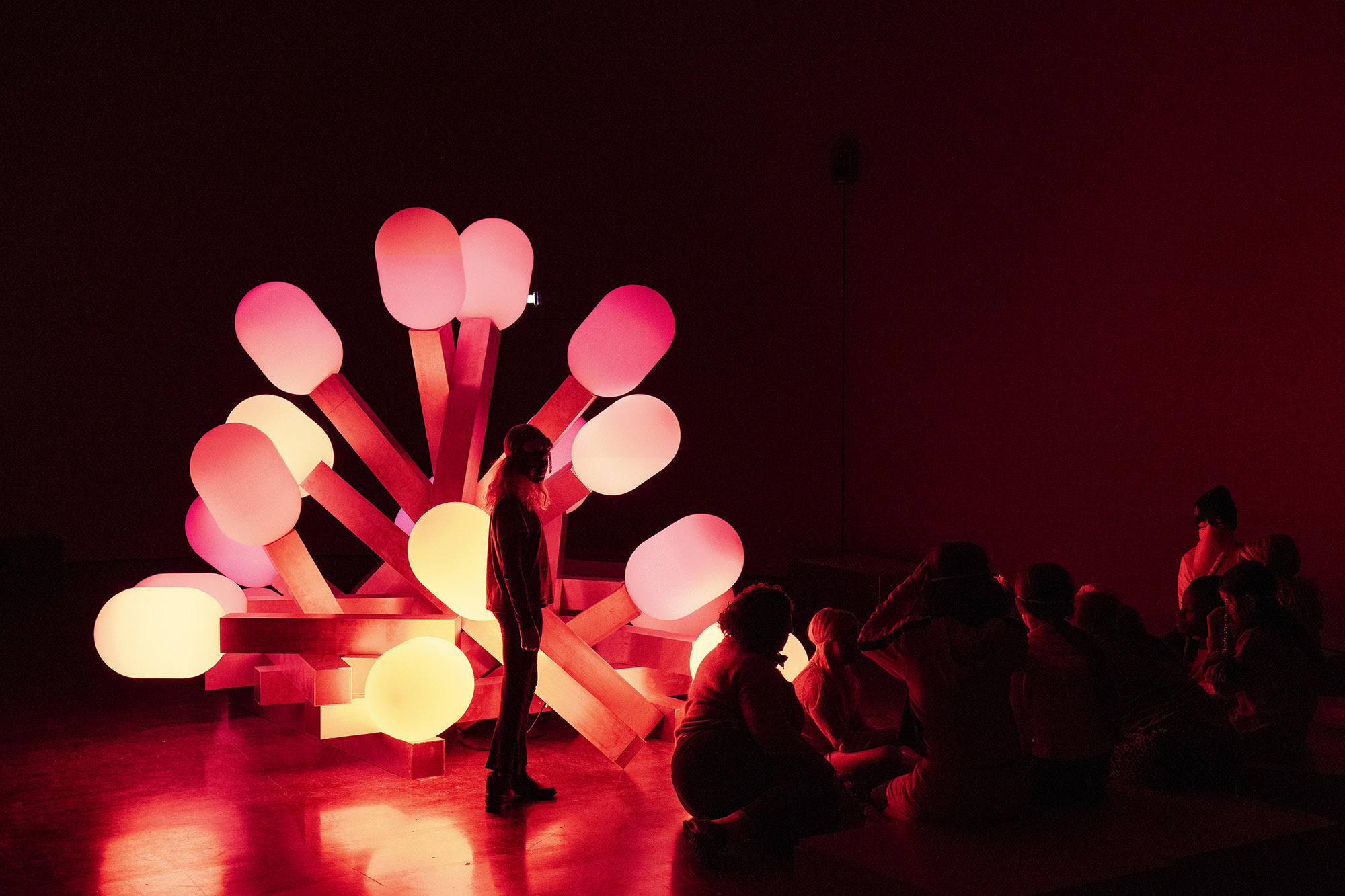
- Genre: Contemporary art
- Begins: 8 September 2022
- Ends: 6 November 2022
- Frequency: Triennial
- Location: Bergen
- Country: Norway
- Previous event: Bergen Assembly 2019
- Next event: Bergen Assembly 2025
- Organizer: Saâdane Afif
- Website: Official website

Bergen Assembly 2022, titled Yasmine and the Seven Faces of the Heptahedron, was the fourth edition of Bergen Assembly and took place from 8 September to 6 November 2022 in Bergen, Norway. It was convened by the artist Saâdane Afif, and was structured around a fictional narrative in which a curator, Yasmine d’O, searches for a seven-sided form referred to as the Heptahedron.

The narrative drew on a play by French author Thomas Clerc inspired by a 2014 performance by Afif, which he adapted into the exhibition's conceptual framework.

The programme comprised seven exhibitions, each associated with a different character — The Professor, The Bonimenteur, The Moped Rider, The Fortune Teller, The Acrobat, The Coalman and The Tourist — which served as conceptual frameworks for works by 21 participating artists across venues throughout Bergen.

In the lead-up to the edition, a series of seven issues of Side Magazine, dedicated to each character, was published as a research site and exhibition catalogue.

Independent art press described the edition as an exhibition that “continually — and whimsically — returns to questions of authorship and identity”. Another review highlighted the work as “a multifaceted spectrum of artwork” in which Afif's role as convener and the fictional curatorial persona of Yasmine form part of the project's performative strategy. A third critical review emphasized the project's narrative conceit and its invitation to the public to traverse the city's exhibition spaces.
