= Rover 2000 =

Rover 2000 may refer to:

- Rover P6, 1963–1977
- Rover SD1, 1976–1986
