= Object to Be Destroyed =

Sculpture by Man Ray

Indestructible Object (1964; replica of 1923 original)

Object to Be Destroyed is a work by American artist Man Ray, originally created in 1923. The work consists of a metronome with a photograph of an eye attached to its swinging arm. After the piece was destroyed in 1957, later remakes in multiple copies were renamed Indestructible Object. Considered a "readymade" piece, in the style established by Marcel Duchamp, it employs an ordinary manufactured object, with little modification, as a work of art. Examples of the work are held in various public collections including the Tate Modern in London, MOMA in New York City, and the Reina Sofía in Madrid.

== Original and early remakes ==
The metronome, originally manufactured by the Qualite Excelsior company, was a mass-produced product that might be commonly found in many homes. It was probably secondhand when Man Ray reconfigured it as an art object, as it was marred, worn, missing minor parts and stood on mismatched feet, though its mechanism was in fair working order. Its box was made of wood, but its internal elements are metal, its front door removable.

The original Object to Be Destroyed was created in 1923. According to Man Ray, the piece was intended as a silent witness in his studio to watch him paint. In 1932, the year Man Ray's lover Lee Miller left him to return to New York, a second version of the piece, called Object of Destruction, was published in the avant-garde journal This Quarter, edited by André Breton. This version featured an ink drawing with the following instructions:

Cut out the eye from a photograph of one who has been loved but is seen no more. Attach the eye to the pendulum of a metronome and regulate the weight to suit the tempo desired. Keep going to the limit of endurance. With a hammer well-aimed, try to destroy the whole at a single blow.

To make the connection to Miller more explicit, the object's original eye was replaced with a photo of hers. This remade piece was exhibited for the first time at Galerie Pierre Colle in Paris as Eye-Metronome in 1933. The remake was lost in 1940 during the German invasion of Paris. A subsequent replica was exhibited as Lost Object in 1945. Man Ray stated that he had always intended to destroy it one day, but as a public performance.

== Destruction and multiple editions ==
While on display in the Exhibition Dada in Paris in 1957, a group of protesting students, led by the French poet Jean-Pierre Rosnay and calling themselves the 'Jarivistes', took Man Ray at his word and actually destroyed the object.

...the show was less than a week old when something like the excitement of the '20s erupted. Storming the gallery, a band of young, self-styled "reactionary nihilist intellectuals" who call themselves the Jarivistes flung handbills riotously into the gallery. "We Jarivistes advise the Dadaists, surrealists and consorts that the reign of minus is over . . . Long live poetry!" Then, grabbing Object to Destroy, they were gone—but with Dadaist Man Ray puffing after them, crying: "They're stealing my painting!" Not far from the gallery, the Jarivistes stopped and set down the one-eyed metronome. One of them hauled out a pistol, took aim and fired, destroying Object to Destroy. At that point the police appeared, late but ardent.

The Jarivistes readily announced that they "are not surrealists but sure realists," not a movement but "motion itself, perpetual motion." To their objections to Dada, Man Ray wearily noted: "These things were done 40 years ago. You are demonstrating against history." A police official mused: "Why shoot it?" But last week, as visitors flocked to the show, Tristan Tzara, the grand old man of Dada, was delighted. "Isn't it wonderful?" he murmured nostalgically.'

Man Ray remade the object yet again in 1958 under the new guise of Indestructible Object. A 1965 collaboration with Swiss artist Daniel Spoerri resulted in an edition of one hundred multiples of Indestructible Object, an allusion to the indestructible nature of the original idea, as well as the difficulty in destroying all one hundred. The work was also exhibited as Last Object in 1966.

Man Ray authorized a further edition of forty sculptures in 1970, where a double-printed image of a blinking eye opens and closes with each swing of the metronome's arm; this late edition was designated Perpetual Motif. A further edition of one hundred metronomes was issued in 1974 by Mario Amaya; these were known as Do Not Destroy.

== In popular culture ==
- Melvyn Bragg's arts programme The South Bank Show used a working version as part of at least one season's title sequence in the 1980s.
- Danny Elfman uses an image of the Indestructible Object on the cover of his Music for a Darkened Theatre, Vol. 1: Film & Television compilation CD.
- The Mark Romanek-directed music video for Nine Inch Nails' 1994 song "Closer" contains footage of a similar piece keeping time with the song.
- Einstürzende Neubauten's 1996 video for the song "Stella Maris" shows a similar piece with Blixa Bargeld's eye.
- They Might Be Giants released an EP entitled Indestructible Object in 2004.
- Australian Ballet's version of Cinderella contains 12 people-sized versions during the garden scene.
- The music video for Orbital's 2022 song "Ringa Ringa (The Old Pandemic Folk Song)" featuring The Mediæval Bæbes opens with a similar piece.

== See also ==
- Readymades of Marcel Duchamp
