= Ron Arad (industrial designer) =

Israeli industrial designer (born 1951)

Ron Arad CBE
- רון ארד
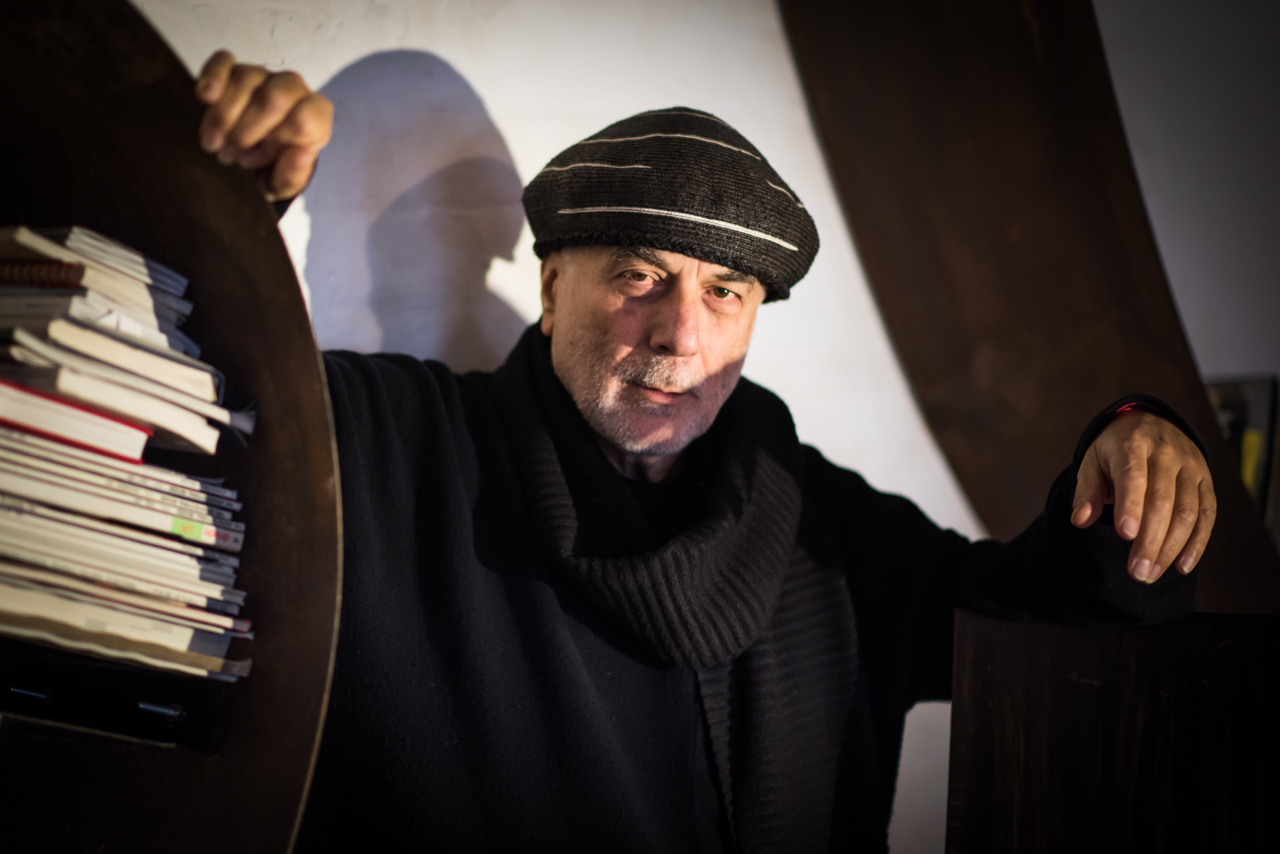
- Arad in 2017
- Born: 24 April 1951 (age 75); Tel Aviv, Israel
- Occupations: industrial designer, artist, architectural designer

Ron Arad (Hebrew: רון ארד; born 24 April 1951) is a British-Israeli industrial designer, artist, and architectural designer. He is best known for his furniture designs, including the postmodern chair Rover.

== Early life ==
Ron Arad was born in Tel Aviv, Israel, in a progressive Jewish family. Both of his parents were artists. He studied at the Bezalel Academy of Arts and Design in Jerusalem between 1971 and 1973, and at the Architectural Association School of Architecture in London from 1974 to 1979.

== Career ==
After graduating, Arad briefly worked as an interior architect under Peter Cook. He co-founded the design and production studio One Off in 1981 with Caroline Thorman. Ron Arad Associates architecture and design practice was formed in 1989, and in 2008 Ron Arad Architects was established alongside Caroline Thorman and Asa Bruno.

=== Design and furniture ===
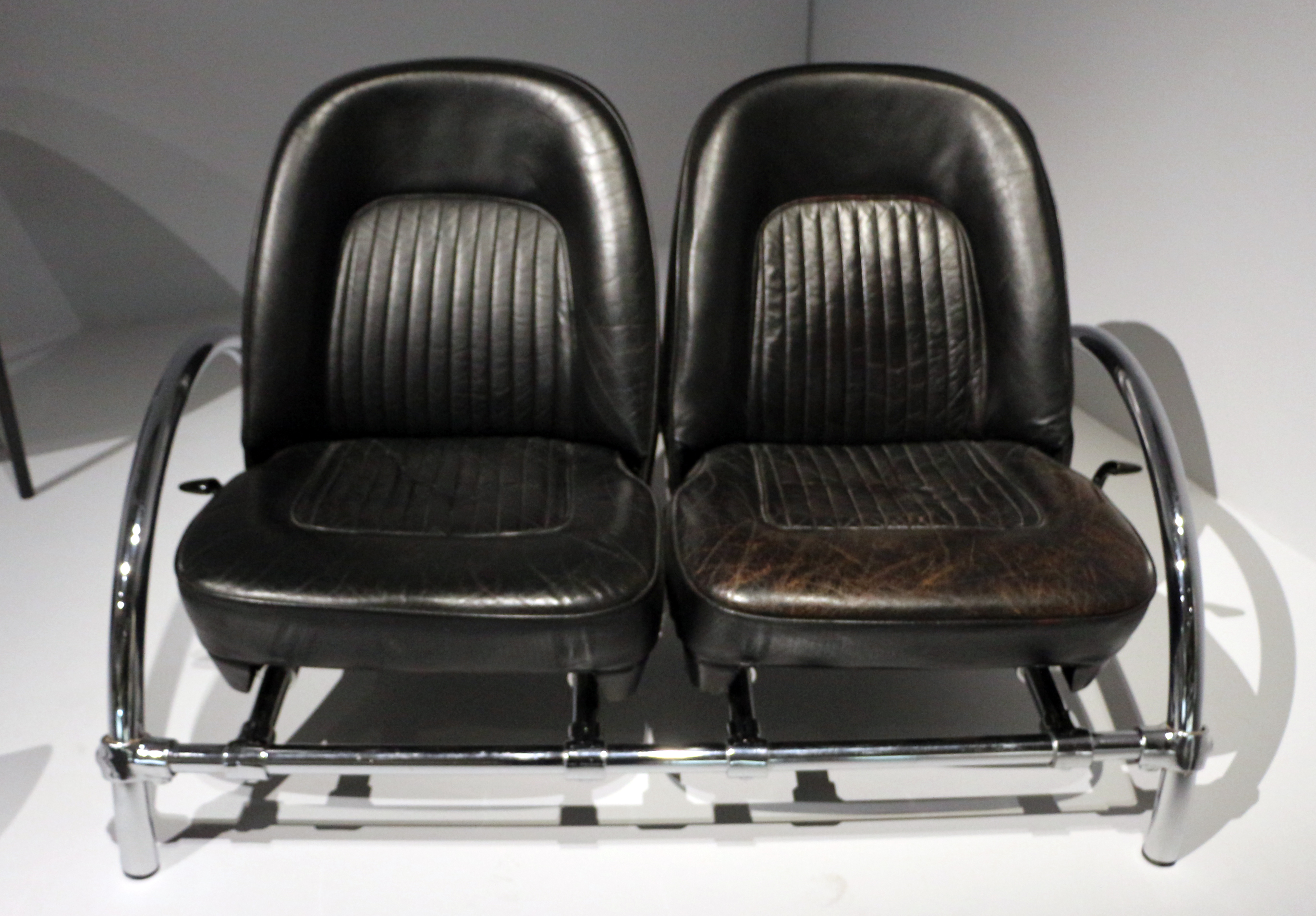
Rover two-seater, 1985, at the Musée National d'Art Moderne

Arad's career as furniture designer began with the 1981 Rover chair, a postmodernist armchair assembled from a scrapyard leather seat from a Rover P6 car combined with a steel frame. Six copies of the chair were acquired by fashion designer Jean Paul Gaultier the same year and made Arad famous overnight.

Arad's designs often involve experimentation with non-traditional materials and unexpected fabrication methods. He often uses biomorphic shapes. His style has been called "ruinism", a definition Arad rejects.

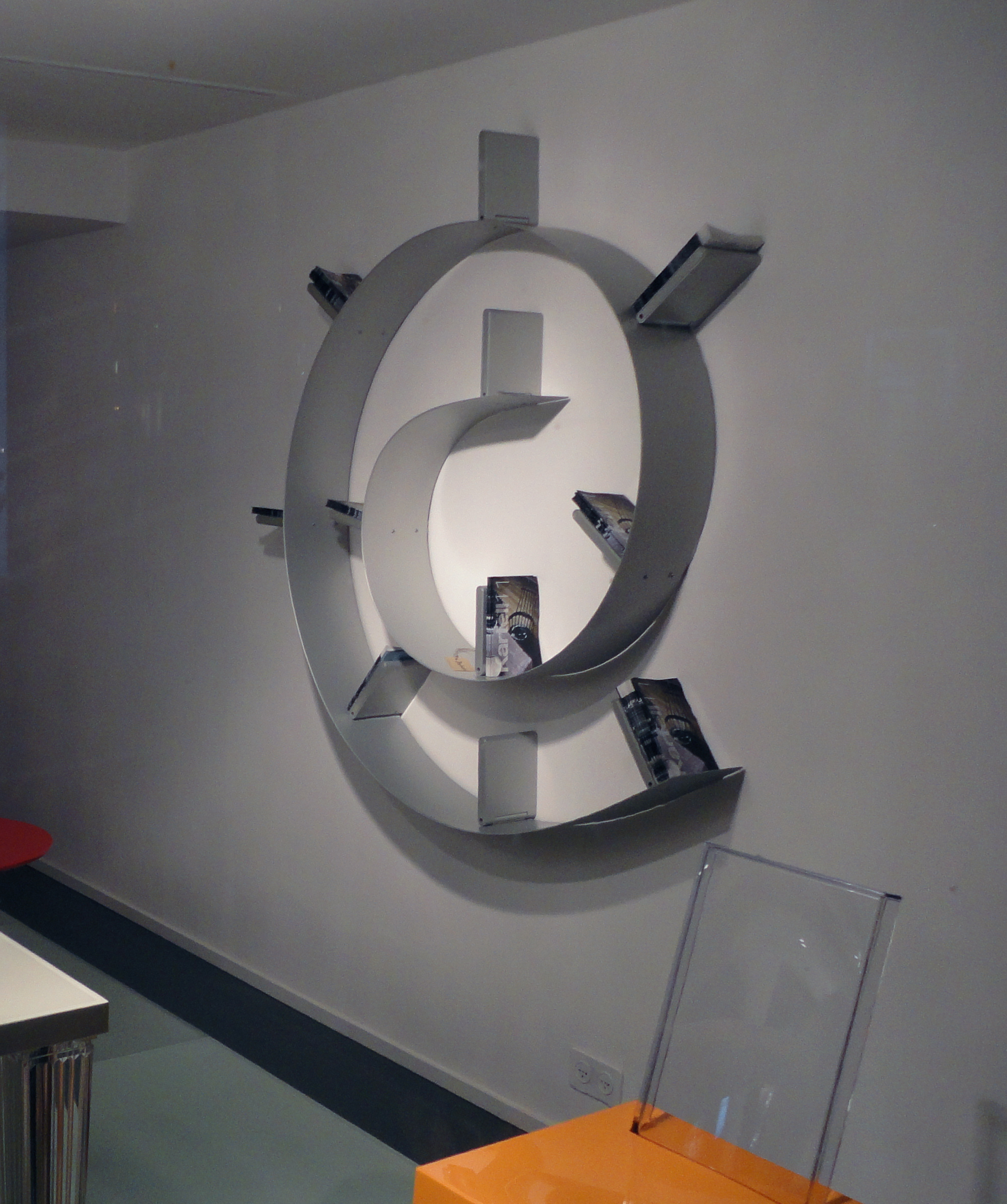
Bookworm shelf

In 1993, he designed the Bookworm, a warped-metal bookshelf, mass-produced by the Italian furniture company Kartell. In 1997, he created the Tom Vac chair, made from ribbed vacuum-formed aluminium, and FPE chair. Over time, his practice expanded to include both limited-edition studio pieces works and design for industrial production for international manufacturers including Moroso, Vitra, Kartell, Alessi, Fiat, Cassina, Cappellini, Driade, Kenzo, Guzzini, WMF, Grundig, Venini, pq Eyewear and Swarovski.

In 2004, Arad designed the Lolita chandelier, a lighting fixture for the Swarovski crystal company that can display SMS text messages with light-emitting diodes.

In 2008–09, Arad collaborated with KENZO to create his first perfume bottle which was on display in his MoMA exhibit No Discipline. In 2012, he designed a collection of adjustable eyeglass frames for New Eye London.

=== Public art ===
Public installations by Ron Arad Studio have been presented in locations including London, Toronto, Seoul, Tokyo, Jerusalem, Singapore and Valencia.

Arad designed the 2011 large-scale video installation "720 Degrees", made of 5,600 8-metre tall silicone cords with projected video that formed a cinerama-like circle. Initially shown in London, the installation later travelled to the Jerusalem, Valencia, and Singapore.

=== Architecture ===
Early architectural projects include the Maserati Showroom in Modena, Italy (2002), the Yohji Yamamoto flagship store in Tokyo, Japan (2003), the Médiacité.

He has also designed the Design Museum Holon together with Asa Bruno, which was opened in 2010.

Ron Arad Architects is also responsible for the ToHa office complex in Tel Aviv. The first phase of the project was completed in 2019, with a second phase currently under construction, extending the scale of the growing ToHa complex. The practice has also designed a cancer hospital in Afula, Israel.

In 2017, Ron Arad Architects won the competition to design the UK Holocaust Memorial as part of a multidisciplinary team. Ron Arad Architects has designed the Maserati Showroom in Modena, Italy (2002), Yohji Yamamoto Flagship Store in Tokyo, Japan (2003) and the Mediacite retail centre in Liège, Belgium. In recent years Arad's firm has been overseeing the construction of a cancer hospital in Afula.

=== Teaching and academic work ===
Arad was Professor of Design at the Hochschule in Vienna from 1994 to 1997 and he served for many years as Professor of Design Products at the Royal College of Art in London, where he later became Professor Emeritus. Arad holds an Honorary Doctorate from Tel Aviv University.

== Exhibitions and collections ==
Ron Arad’s work has been the subject of major exhibitions and retrospectives at institutions worldwide. These include solo exhibitions at the Victoria and Albert Museum in London, the Vitra Design Museum in Weil am Rhein, the Barbican Centre in London, the Centre Pompidou in Paris, the Museum of Modern Art in New York, the Triennale Milano, the Venice Biennale, Ivory Press in Madrid, the Holon Design Museum.

== Honours ==
Arad was Head of Design Products Department at the Royal College of Art from 1997 to 2009. He was Professor of Design at the Hochschule in Vienna from 1994 to 1997, and later Professor of Design Products at the Royal College of Art in London up until 2009, when he was made Professor Emeritus.

He was awarded the Royal Designer for Industry (RDI) in 2002 and the London Design Medal of London Design Festival in 2011. In 2012 he was elected a Royal Academician by the Royal Academy of Art in London. Arad holds an Honorary Doctorate from Tel Aviv University. His work has been exhibited at the MoMA, the V&A and Centre Georges Pompidou. Arad is a Royal Academician. He has received numerous awards including the London Design Medal during the London Design Festival in 2011.

== Personal life ==
Arad lives and works in Camden, north London. His brother is the violist and educator Atar Arad.

== Gallery ==
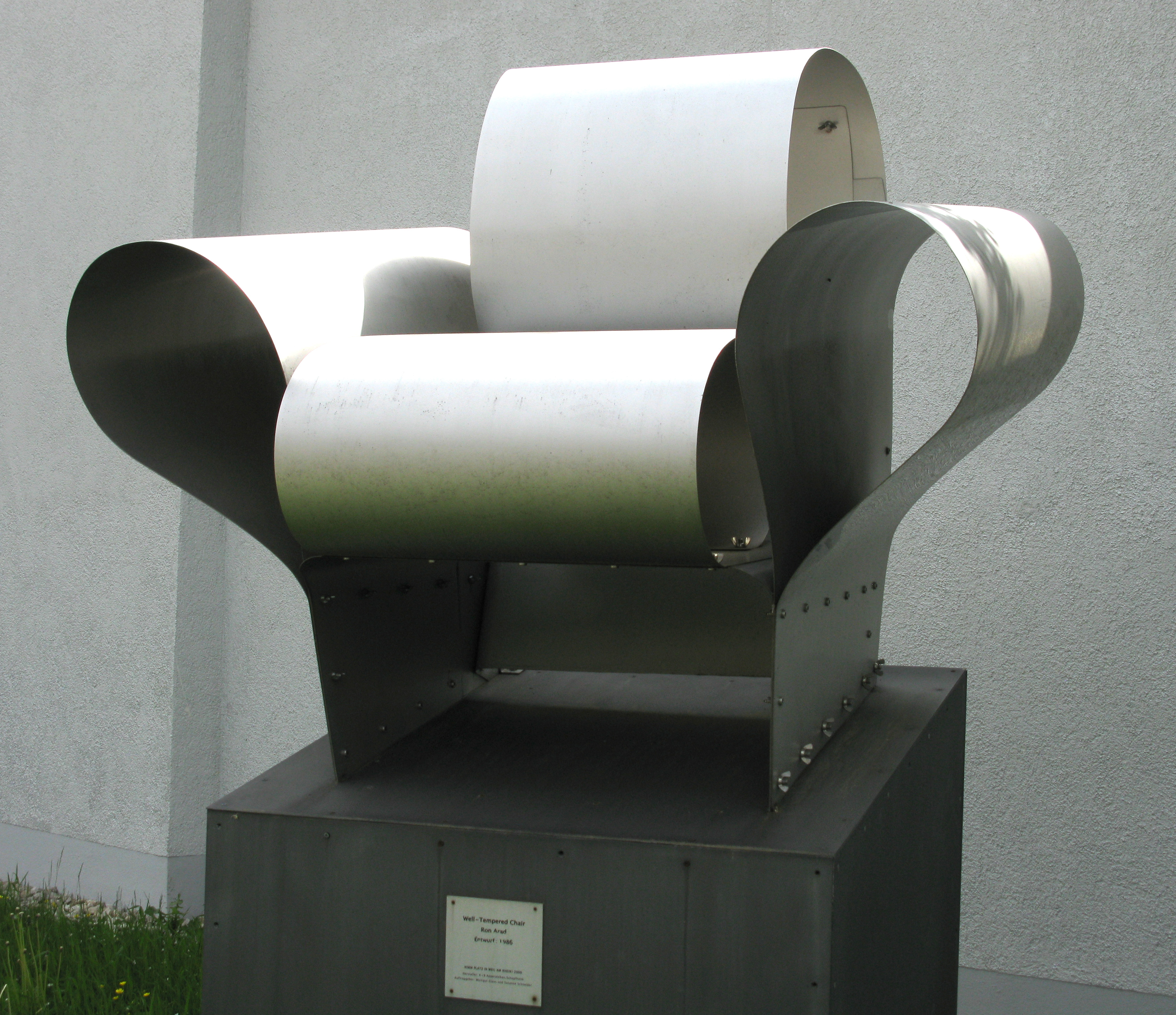
Well Tempered Chair (1986)

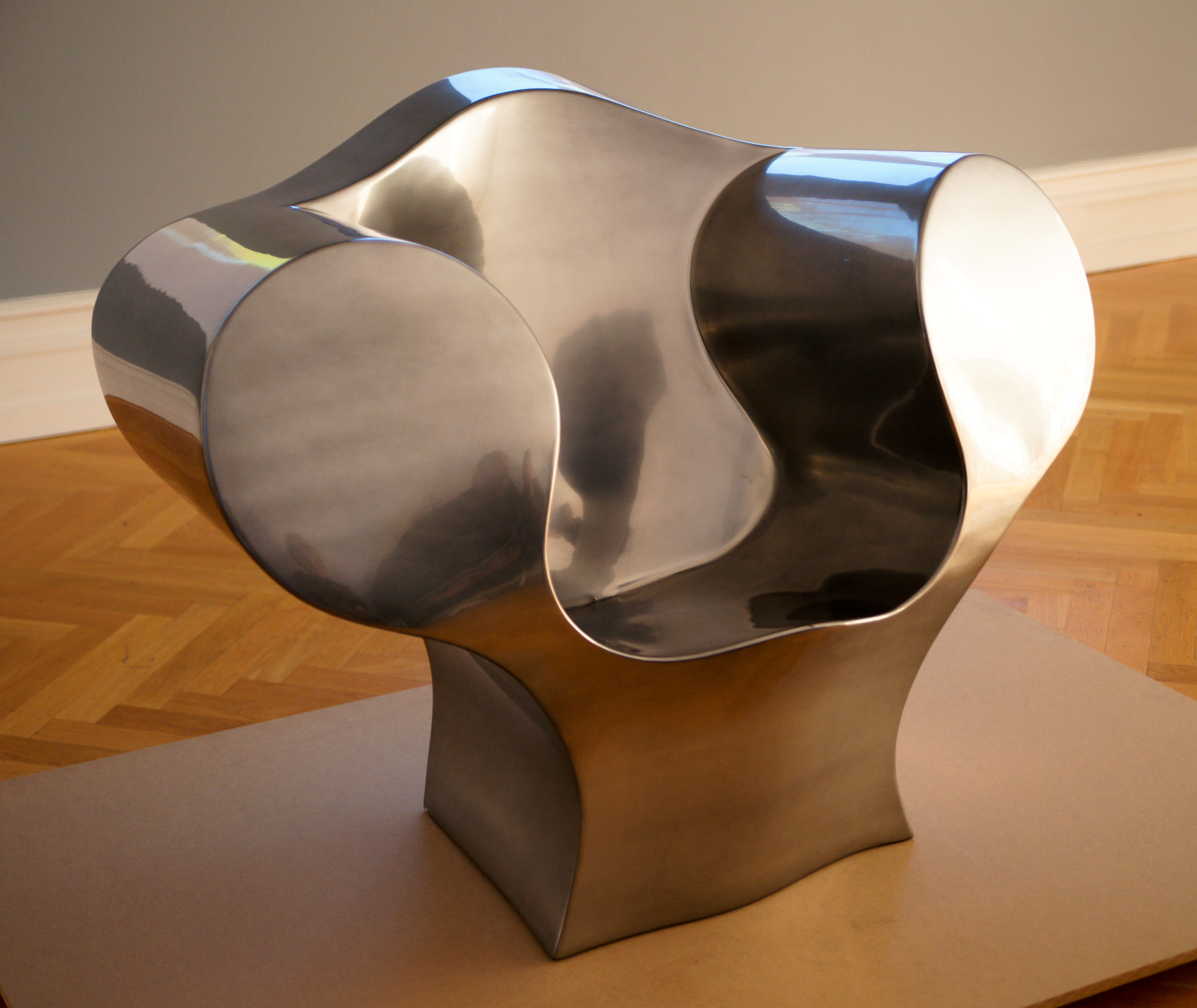
The Big Easy Chair (1987), chrome

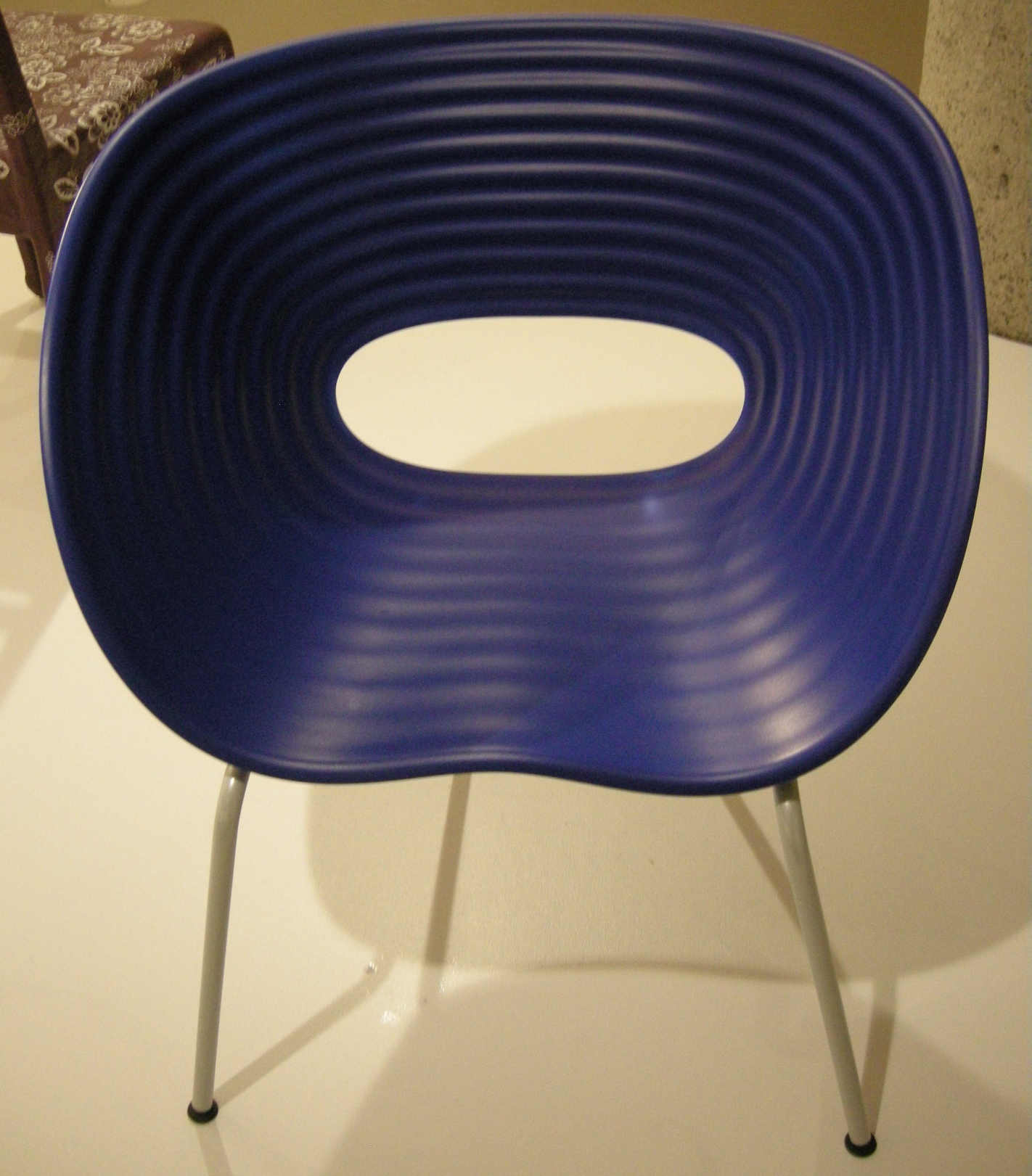
Tom Vac chair (1997)

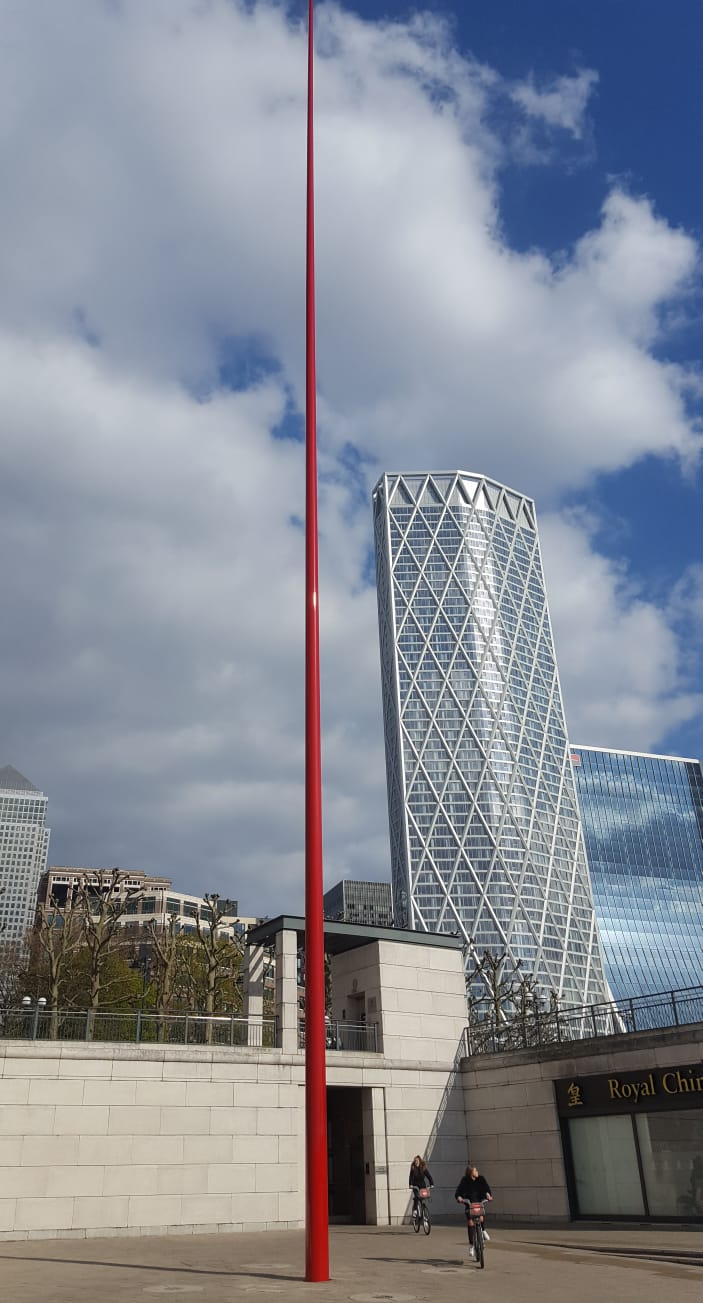
Windwand (Carbon fibre, 2000) at Canary Riverside, Canary Wharf, London

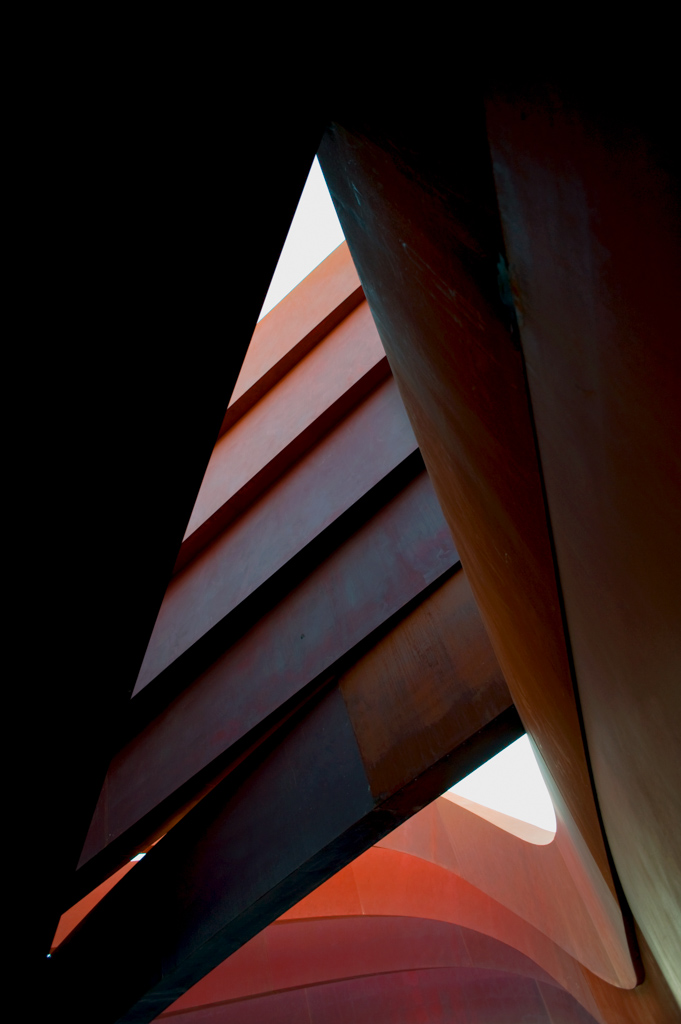
Design Museum Holon at 2010 opening in Holon, Israel

== See also ==
- Visual arts in Israel
