= Fountain Archive =

Processual art project

The Fountain Archive (also called The Fountain Archives or Fountain Archive Project) is a processual art project of the French conceptual artist Saâdane Afif which started in 2008/ 2009. The project includes an ongoing series of framed pages which contain one or several reproductions of the 1917 work Fountain by Marcel Duchamp. Here Afif uses the concept of the Objet trouvés (found object) and tears off the pages from different publications. For each publication and pages Afif normally makes only one piece for the Fountain Archives, which is created as a work of art.

The Fountain Archive also includes a bookshelf which stores all used publications of the project.

== Origin and description ==
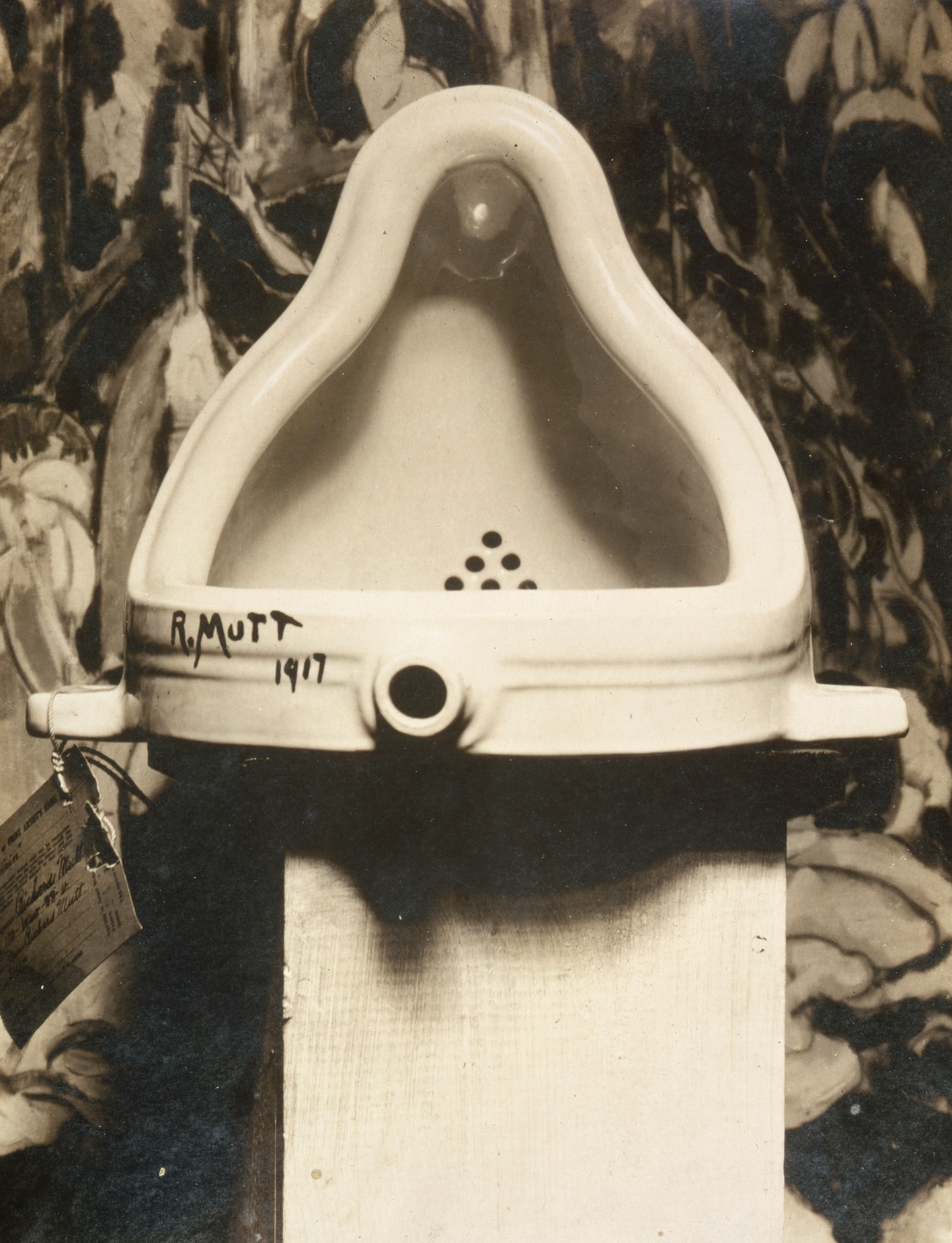
Fountain, 1917, signed "R. Mutt"

In 2008 Saâdane Afif started to collect publications which contain reproductions of the work Fountain (1917) by Marcel Duchamp. After he was distinguished with the Marcel Duchamp Prize in 2009, Afif began the Fountain Archive. At present the Fountain Archive contains over 600 images of Duchamp’s porcelain urinal. In this work, Afif collects and archives every publication in which he finds a reproduction of Duchamp's urinal. As a “found object” every page containing the picture of the Fountain is torn out and then carefully framed. The frame (sometimes with a colored background), used for its preservation and highlight ornament purposes, is also part of the making process. Every step of the archiving follows meticulous rules which participate entirely in the making process of these works of art. For each publication and page Afif normally makes only one piece for the Fountain Archive.

If a publication contains images of Duchamp’s Fountain on several pages, all of them are torn off and form together a polyptych. When found, the publications are registered with an archive number ranging from FA 0001 potentially to infinite. Afif intended to continue the Series of Archives until its 1001st. The publications (sans Fountain) are then stored in a bookshelf in the studio of the artist. The bookshelf creates an archive around Duchamp’s Fountain, from which the common initiator has been removed: “an archive without its object“. The Fountain Archives has been presented in various exhibitions throughout the world.

Since 2013, some publications presenting this project by Afif happened to reproduce the work Fountain of Duchamp. Those specific documents are also incorporated in the Fountain Archives project. But they are treated as special objects as they are doubled in order to testify of a historical echo, mark a mise en abyme. In case of the mise en abyme – a publication includes an image of Afif's Fountain Archive project – there is also one exception to the strict rule that each publication produced only a unique, singular work of the Fountain Archive. These pages underline an evolution in the development and perception of the Fountain Archives as an artwork. They are stored under a specific section titled “Augmented”, and they are building a step-by-step archive within the archive. Therefore, two copies of the publications (sans Fountain) enter the archive bookshelf and two editions of the work are made.

== History ==
In 2013 a group of 101 Fountain Archives were shown in the exhibition “The Present Order is the Disorder of the Future” based in the Museum Kurhaus Kleve. Referring to the presentation a first text, by the art historic Valentina Vlasic, about the Fountain Archive was published in the exhibition catalogue. This catalogue contribution included a picture of Duchamp’s Fountain, therefore Afif tears the page off and makes an augmented fountain archive out of it. This said Klever Fountain, with the description FA 0366, is based in the collection of the Museum Kurhaus Kleve as a permanent loan.

== Interpretations ==
The German art historian Eva Huttenlauch named Marcel Duchamp as Afif’s guiding star, he looked up as his ideal self. Many of Afif’s concepts, like the Fountain Archive, rest on the foundations Duchamp laid.

The Austrian art historian Valentina Vlasic termed Afif’s Fountain Archive as a repetition of the key-moment of the ready-made, the fundamental act of selecting which just as it did at that time for Duchamp, represents a complete artistic achievement. Afif does not do this with real objects, like a normal commercial one, but he uses the artistic object of the Fountain as an illustration from publications. As a charming witticism, Vlasic predicated that there is in addition the fact that Afif leads Duchamp’s Fountain in a new way back into the museum, a site it had to leave about one hundred years ago through being excluded from the exhibition.

For the art historian Elena Filipovic, the high importance of Duchamp’s Fountain in art history accrued especially because of the reason that the artist understood very well that the reproduction, display, framing, dissemination, and reception of an artwork not only constructs its value and meaning, but also help determine how and if it enters history at all. This comprehension stands also for the background of Saâdane Afif's project of the Fountain Archives. After “R.Mutt“ or Marcel Duchamp Filipovic sees in Afif another person which adopts the white urinal and also conducts the construction of an icon. The Fountain Archives, which contain an image of a Fountain Archive (mise en abyme), is termed as a “remake” by Filipovic. She compares especially these works with the process of signification of Duchamp’s Fountain in art history.

== Bibliography ==
- Elena Filipovic, Xavier Hufkens: Sâadane Afif. Fontaines. Triangle Books, 2014, ISBN 978-2-930777-05-4.
- Valentina Vlasic: Saâdane Afif, in: The Present Order is the Disorder of the Future, Schriftenreihe Museum Kurhaus Kleve – Ewald Mataré-Sammlung Nr. 62, Freundeskreis Museum Kurhaus und Koekkoek-Haus Kleve e.V. (Hrsg), 2013, p. 57.

== Exhibitions ==
- Fountain Archive, Saâdane Afif, in: The Present Order is the Disorder of the Future, 14. July 2013 – 15. September 2013, Museum Kurhaus Kleve – Ewald Mataré-Sammlung, Kleve, Germany.
- Fountain Archive, Saâdane Afif, in: Affiches & Fontaines, 25. April – 7. June 2014, Gallery Xavier Hufkens, Brussels, Belgium.
- Fountain Archive, Saâdane Afif, in: Toutes Directions – Le Prix Marcel Duchamp, 21. September 2014 – 11. January 2015, Wilhelm-Hack-Museum, Ludwigshafen, Germany.
- Fountain Archive, Saâdane Afif, in: Unendliche Bibliothek - Alte Fabrik, 24. January – 29. March 2015 Gebert Stiftung für Kultur, Rapperswil, Switzerland.
