= Rover P6 =

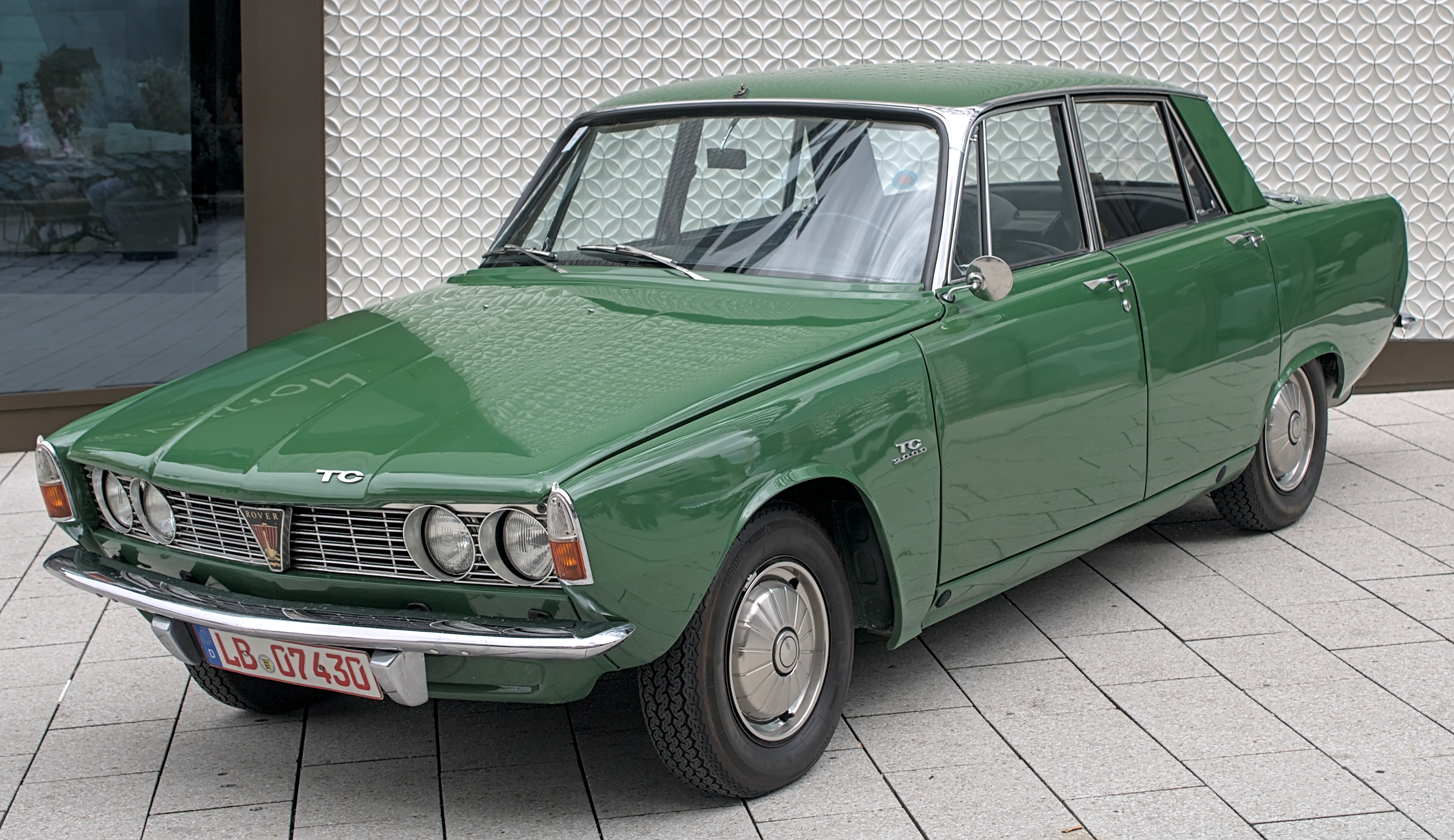
- Rover 2000 TC Mark I

Overview
- Manufacturer: The Rover Co. Ltd (1963–1967); Leyland Motors (1967–1968); British Leyland (1968–1977)
- Production: 1963–1977; 322,302 produced
- Assembly: United Kingdom: Solihull (Solihull plant); New Zealand: Nelson (NZMC); South Africa: Blackheath (Leykor)
- Designer: Spen King, Gordon Bashford, David Bache

Body and chassis
- Class: Executive car (E)
- Body style: 4-door saloon
- Layout: FR layout

Powertrain
- Engine: 2.0 L OHC I4; 2.2 L OHC I4; 3.5 L Rover OHV V8
- Transmission: 4-speed manual (2.0 & 2.2); 4-speed manual (3500S, modified Rover box to handle the extra torque); 3-speed automatic B / W 35 and later B / W 65 (2.2 & 3500)

Dimensions
- Wheelbase: 103 in (2,616 mm)
- Length: 180 in (4,572 mm)
- Width: 66 in (1,676 mm)
- Height: 56 in (1,422 mm)
- Kerb weight: 2,810 lb (1,275 kg) (2000TC); 2,862 lb (1,298 kg) (3500)

Chronology
- Predecessor: Rover P4; Rover P5 (concurrent to 1973)
- Successor: Rover SD1

The Rover P6 series (named as the 2000, 2200, or 3500, depending on engine displacement) is a saloon car produced by Rover and subsequently British Leyland from 1963 to 1977 in Solihull, West Midlands, England, UK.

The P6 was the first winner of the European Car of the Year award.

== Development ==
The P6 was announced on 9 October 1963, just before the Earls Court Motor Show. The vehicle was marketed first as the Rover 2000 and was a complete "clean sheet" design intended to appeal to a larger number of buyers than earlier models such as the P4 it replaced. Rover had identified a developing market between the standard '1.5-litre' saloon car class (such as the Ford Consul and the Singer Gazelle) and the accepted 'three-litre' large saloon cars (typified by the Wolseley 6/99 and the Vauxhall Cresta). Younger and increasingly affluent professional workers and executives were seeking out cars that were superior to the normal 1.5-litre models in style, design and luxury but offered more modern driving dynamics than the big three-litre class and lower purchase and running costs than sports saloons such as the Jaguar Mark 2. Automotive technology had improved significantly in the mid-to-late 1950s, typified by the introduction of cars such as the Citroën DS and Lancia Flavia in Europe and the Chevrolet Corvair in America. The replacement for the traditionally designed P4 would therefore be a smaller car with a two-litre engine (although a gas turbine was envisioned as power unit in the future) using the latest design, engineering and styling. The P6 was thus one of the earliest examples of what would now be classified as an executive car. The P6 would be lower-priced than the P4 and sales volumes were anticipated to be significantly higher. The more upmarket and conservative P5 was sold alongside the P6 until 1973.

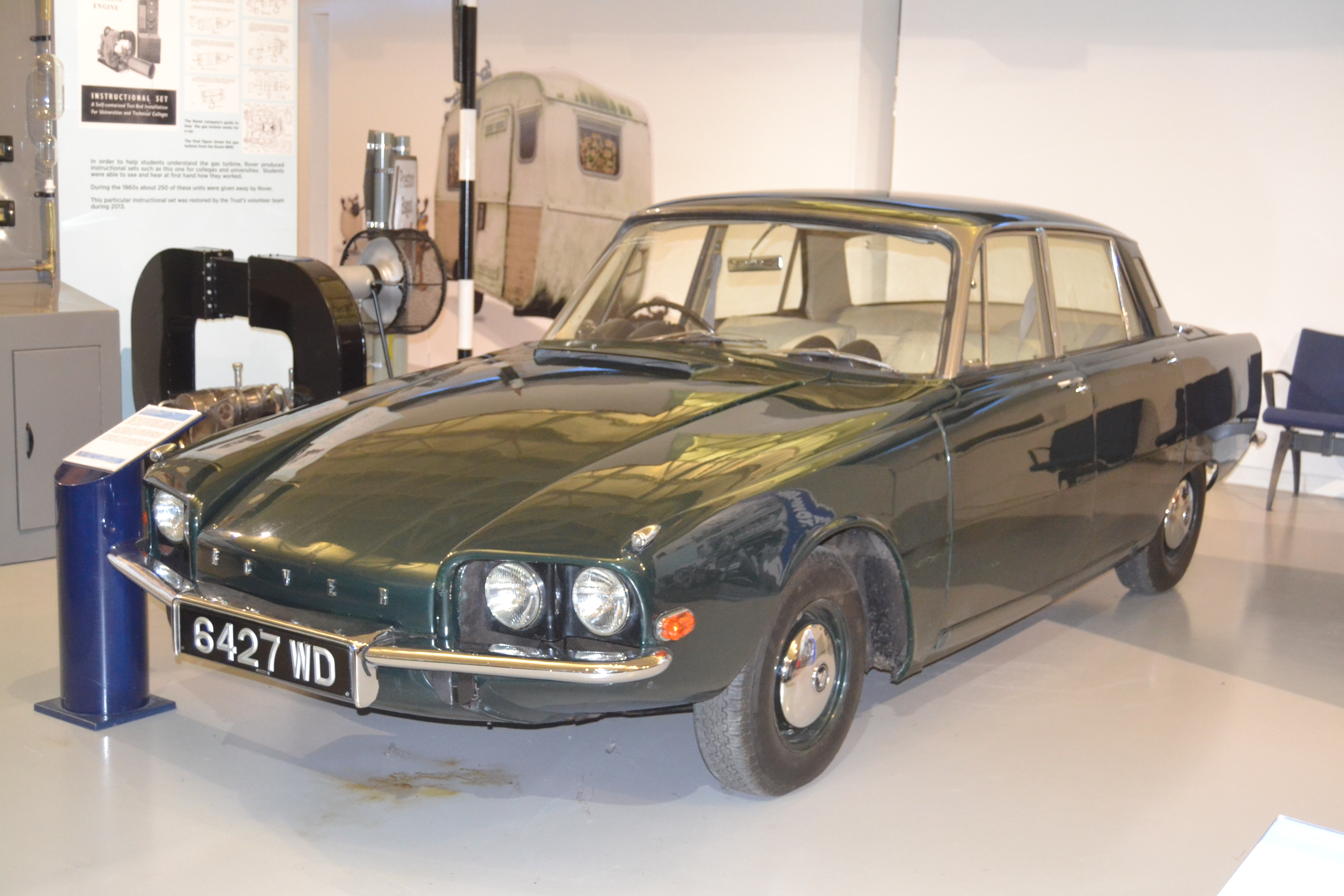
Rover T4 gas turbine prototype (1961)

The 2000 was advanced for the time with a de Dion tube suspension at the rear, four-wheel disc brakes (inboard on the rear), and a fully synchromesh transmission. The unibody design featured non-stressed panels bolted to a unit frame, inspired by the Citroën DS. The de Dion set-up was unique in that the "tube" was in two parts that could telescope, thereby avoiding the need for sliding splines in the drive shafts, with consequent stiction under drive or braking torque, while still keeping the wheels vertical and parallel in relation to the body.

The Rover 2000 won industry awards for safety when it was introduced and included a carefully designed "safety" interior. One innovative feature was the prism of plastic on the top of the front side lights. This allowed the driver to see the front corner of the car in low-light conditions, and also confirmed that the side lights were indeed on. The relatively sharp plastic projections did not meet pedestrian safety standards in some export markets (including Germany), however, and so a lens with a smooth top was substituted where the law demanded.

One unique feature of the Rover 2000 was the design of the front suspension system, in which a bell crank (an L-shaped rotating bracket trailing the upper hub carrier joint) conveyed the vertical motion of the wheel to a fore-and-aft-horizontally mounted spring fastened to the rear wall of the engine compartment. A single hydraulically damped arm was mounted on the bulkhead for the steering. The front suspension was designed to allow as much width for the engine compartment as possible so that Rover's gas turbine engine could be fitted. The styling outline was first seen in the 1961 prototype T4, a front-engined front-wheel-drive gas turbine saloon, one of a line of gas turbine prototypes built by Rover in the 1950s and 1960s. T4 survives today and can be seen at the British Motor Museum.

In the event, the gas turbine engine was never used for the P6, but the engine compartment (with slightly amended shape) was wide enough for the Buick-derived Rover V8 engine, which was available in the P6 from April 1968.

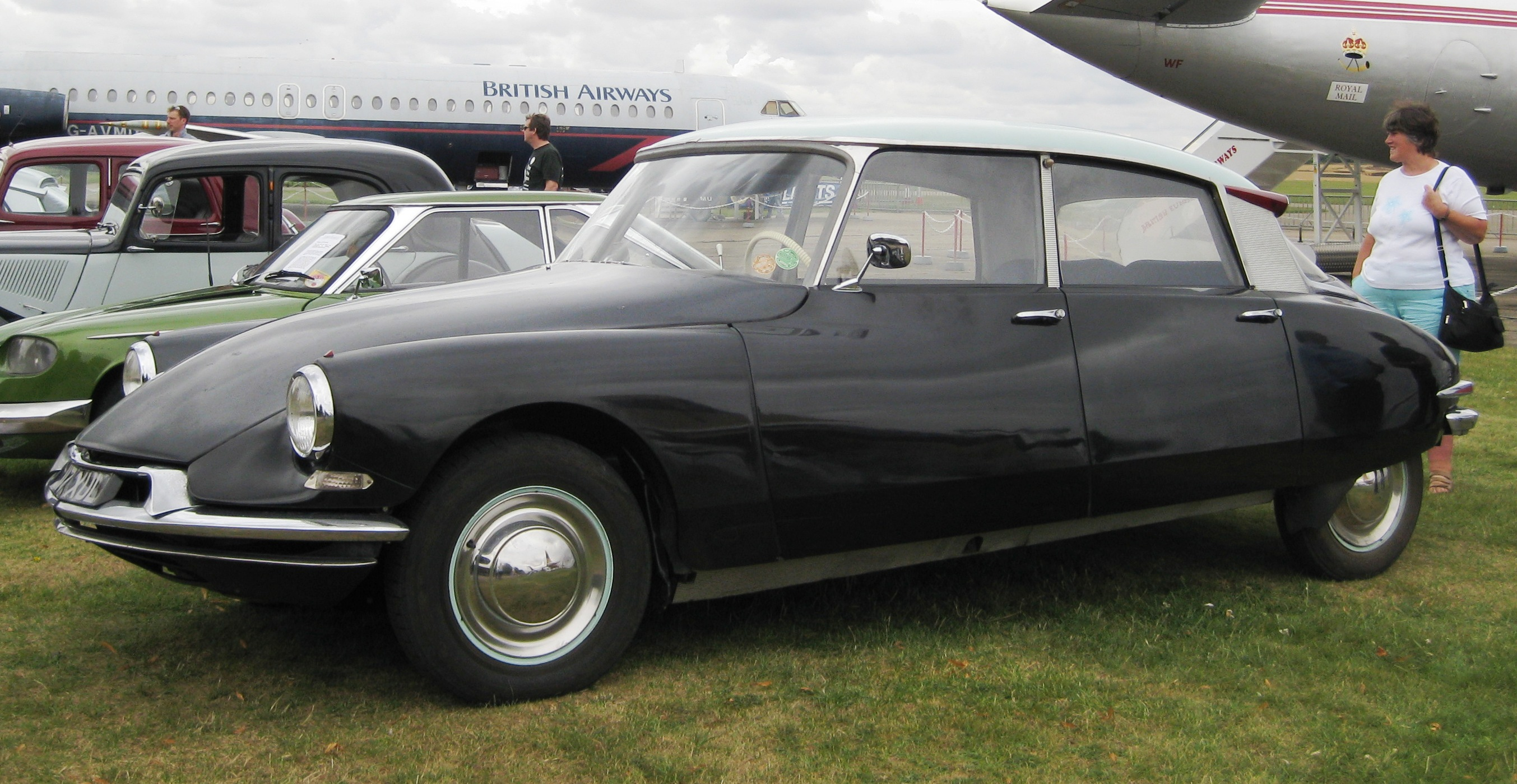
The Citroën DS19 inspired the Rover 2000 design

Sculptor Flaminio Bertoni's Citroën DS body inspired David Bache. With a nod to the new Kamm tail, the finished Rover appearance incorporated a necessarily enlarged boot filled otherwise by Rover's de Dion rear suspension. It lacked the Citroën shark nose, which it was planned to introduce later as a drooping bonnet with headlamps in pods and projecting sidelights.

Luggage compartment space was limited due to the complex rear suspension and, in Series II vehicles, the boot mounted battery. The spare wheel competed for space also, and was stored either flat on the boot floor or vertically to the side. A later optional 'touring package' allowed the spare to be carried on the boot lid; with a vinyl weatherproof cover. When not in place, the mounting bracket was concealed by a circular Rover badge. Series II models briefly offered Dunlop Denovo Run-flat tyre, eliminating the need for a spare, though this was not commonly selected and is very unusual on surviving examples.

The car's primary competitor on the domestic UK market was the Triumph 2000, also released in October 1963, just one week after the P6. In continental Europe, the Rover 2000 competed in the same sector as the Citroën DS which, like the initial Rover offering, was offered only with a four-cylinder engine, a situation which was resolved in the Rover when the V8 was introduced. The Rover 2000 interior was not as spacious as those of its Triumph and Citroën rivals, especially in the back, where its sculpted two-person rear seat implied that customers wishing to accommodate three in the back of a Rover should opt for the larger and older Rover P5.

== Series I ==
=== 2000 ===
Rover 2000/2000 SC/2000 TC
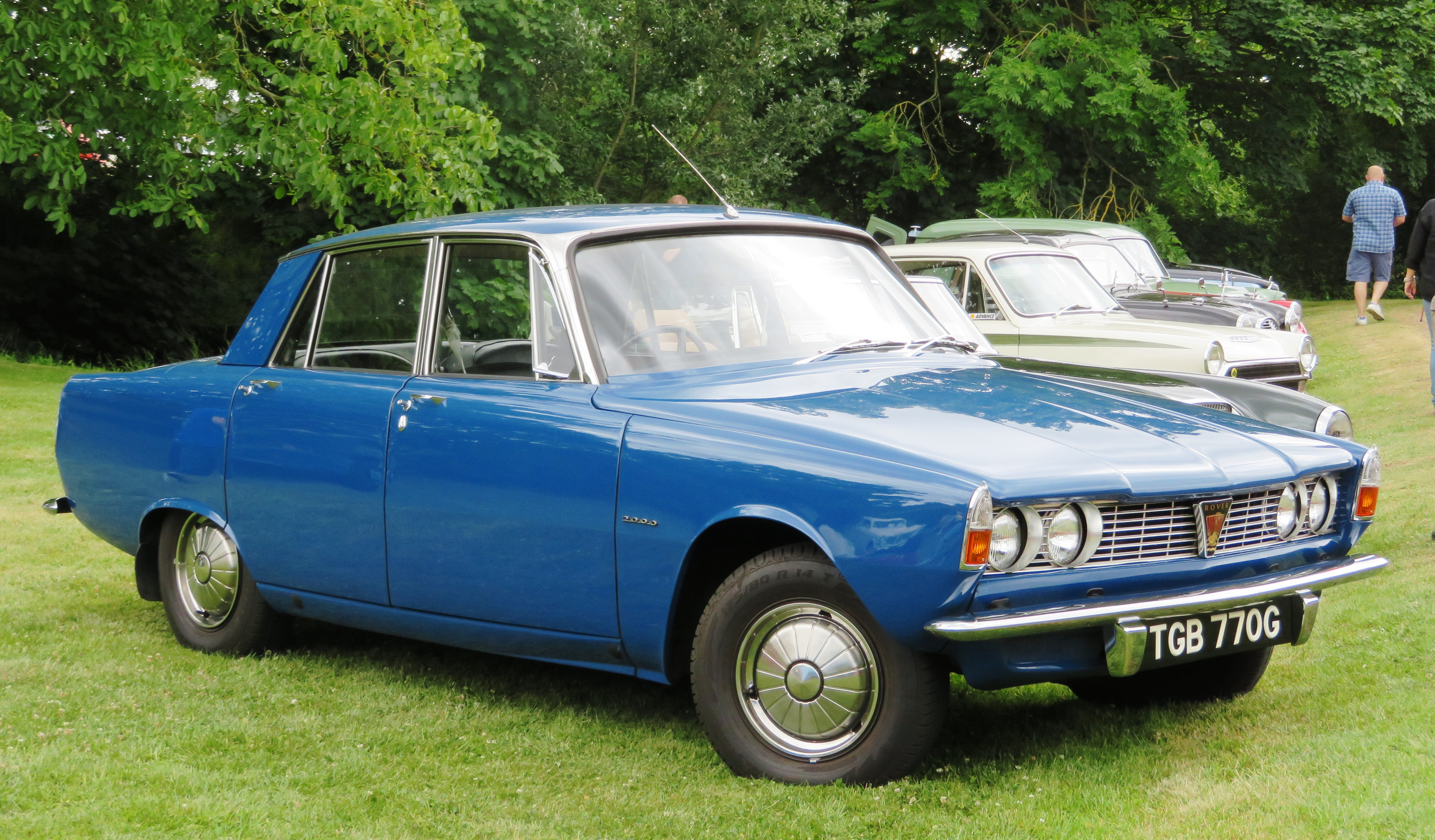
- P6 Rover 2000, pre-facelift

Overview
- Production: 1963–1973; 208,875 produced

Powertrain
- Engine: 2.0 L I4

The first P6 used a 2.0 L (1,978 cc or 120.7 cu in) engine designed specifically for the P6. Although it was announced towards the end of 1963, the car had been in "pilot production" since the beginning of the year, therefore deliveries were able to begin immediately. Original output was in the order of 104 bhp (78 kW). At the time the engine was unusual in having an overhead camshaft layout. The cylinder head had a perfectly flat surface, and the combustion chambers were cast into the piston crowns (sometimes known as a Heron head). With the rapid construction of motorways around the world, many of which (including those in the United Kingdom in this period) had no upper speed limits, the P6's engine was developed to be efficient, smooth and reliable when driven at high speeds for long periods. It had 'square' dimensions where the cylinder bore and stroke were the same (85.7 mm or 3.4 in) to minimise piston speeds and bearing loads, which was very unusual amongst British saloon cars: these tended to have under-square (long stroke) engines, a lingering legacy of the pre-1947 horsepower tax system and the driving conditions encountered on British roads in the pre-motorway era.

Cars that were built until 1966 are referred to as early cars. The Rover 2000 had many detailed differences that changed over the first 3 years of production. Items such as exhaust systems, gear linkages and most visibly the front valance. It had vertical slats and was curved with no extra bumps which gave the car the nickname "sharks tooth". Also on these cars the boot-shuts and the door-shuts of the base unit were painted body colour. The cars varied very slightly in appearance because radio aerials, a heated rear window and a locking fuel cap were optional extras. Early instrument panels were not made of plastic. The speedometer only went up to 110 mph and the centre console and pedals were different on later cars.

A number of very early cars still exist in some form. The earliest surviving production P6 is 102 FJJ, which has a good number of original panels. It is being rebuilt around a 1965 base unit. Three of the FLK cars exist 143, 145 and 149, two of which have been restored. The gold car or the 100th 2000 off the production line also survives in restored condition.

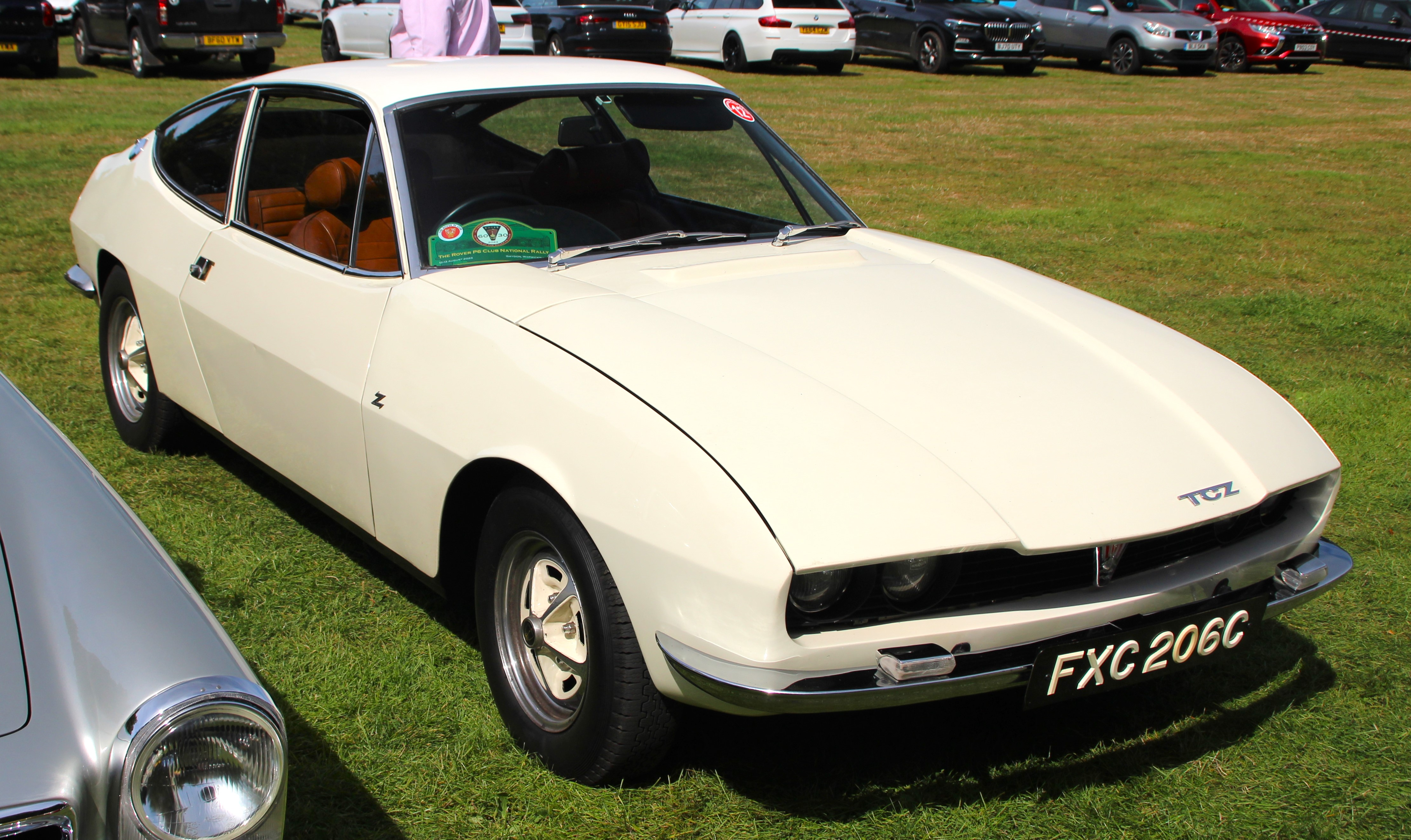
Rover TCZ, based on P6 2000, designed by Ercole Spada of Zagato, displayed at 1967 Turin Auto Show.

Rover later developed a derivative of the engine by fitting twin SU carburettors and a redesigned top end and marketed the revised specification vehicles as the 2000 TC. The 2000 TC was launched in March 1966 for export markets in North America and continental Europe. Limited availability of the redesigned induction manifold needed for the twin-carburettor engine was given as one reason for restricting the 2000 TC to overseas sales. The manufacturers also stated pointedly that the UK's recently introduced blanket 70 mph (112.65 km/h) speed limit would make the extra speed of the new car superfluous on the domestic market. Fortunately for performance-oriented UK buyers, supplies of the redesigned inlet manifold must have improved and the company relented in time for the London Motor Show in October 1966 when the 2000 TC became available for the UK market. The 2000 TC prototypes had run in the Rally of Great Britain as part of their test programme. It featured a bigger starter motor and tachometer as standard and was identifiable by "TC" initials on the bodywork. The power output of the 2000 TC engine was around 110 bhp (82 kW) net. The standard specification engines continued in production in vehicles designated as 2000 SC models. These featured the original single SU.

=== 3500 ===
Rover 3500/3500S
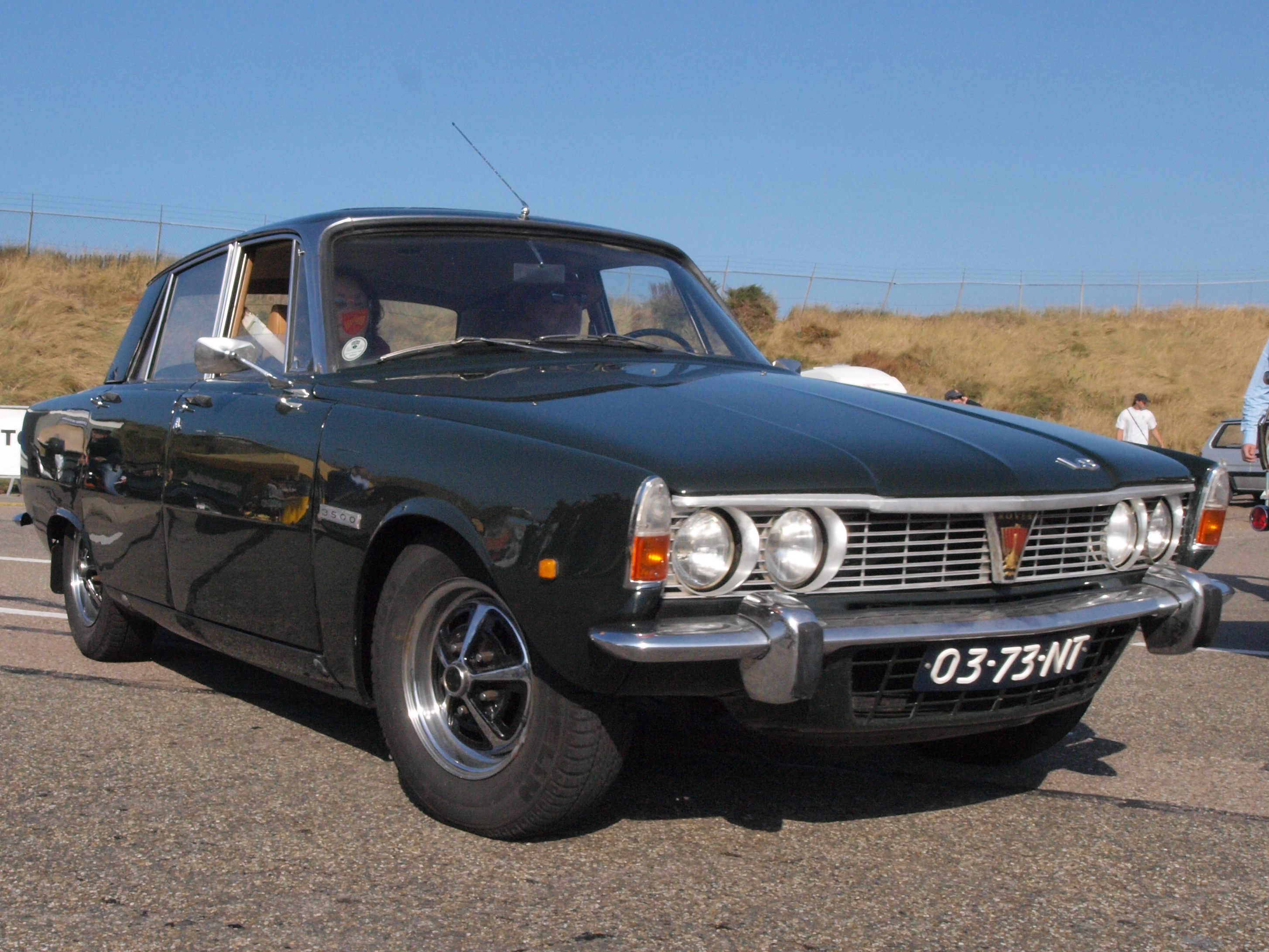

Overview
- Also called: Rover V8 Sport (South Africa)
- Production: 1968–1977; 81,057 produced

Powertrain
- Engine: 3.5 L Rover OHV V8

Rover saw Buick's compact 3.5-litre V8 from the Buick Special as a way to differentiate the P6 from its chief rival, the Triumph 2000. They purchased the rights to the innovative aluminium engine and once it was modified to allow its use by Rover, it became an instant hit. The Rover V8 engine outlived its original host, the P5B, by more than thirty years.

The 3500 was introduced in April 1968 (one year after the Rover company was purchased by Triumph's owner, Leyland) and continued to be offered until 1977. The manufacturer asserted that the light metal V8 engine weighed the same as the four-cylinder unit of the Rover 2000, and the more powerful car's maximum speed of 114 mph (183 km/h) as well as its 10.5-second acceleration time from 0-60 mph (97 km/h) were considered impressive, and usefully faster than most of the cars with which, on the UK market, the car competed on price and specifications. (The exception was the Jaguar 340, which was substantially quicker than the Rover 3500 and was advertised at a 15 per cent lower manufacturer's recommended price, the Jaguar representing exceptional value as a "run-out" model, and was replaced later in 1968 by the Jaguar XJ6.)

In comparison, the Rover 3500 auto tested by Motor magazine in the issue published on 20 April 1968 achieved a maximum speed of 117 miles per hour (188 km/h) (mean), 0–60 mph in 9.5 seconds, with a standing quarter-mile in 17.6 seconds.

It was necessary to modify the under-bonnet space to squeeze the V8 engine into the P6 engine bay: the front suspension cross-member had to be relocated forward, while a more visible change was an extra air intake beneath the front bumper to accommodate the larger radiator. There was no longer space under the bonnet for the car's battery, which in the 3500 retreated to a position on the right side of the boot. Nevertheless, the overall length and width of the body were unchanged when compared with the smaller-engined original P6.

Having invested heavily in the car's engine and running gear, the manufacturer left most other aspects of the car unchanged. However, the new Rover 3500 could be readily distinguished from the 2000 thanks to various prominent V8 badges on the outside and beneath the radio. The 3500 was also delivered with a black vinyl covering on the C-pillar, although this decoration later appeared also on four-cylinder cars.

A 3-speed Borg Warner 35 automatic was the only transmission until the 1971 addition of a four-speed manual 3500S model, fitted with a modified version of the gearbox used in the 2000/2200. The letter "S" did not denote "Sport", it was chosen because it stood for something specific on those cars: "Synchromesh". However, the 3500S was noticeably quicker than the automatic version of this car with a 0–60 mph time of 9 seconds, compared with 10.1 for the automatic. The manual car's official cycle was 24 mpg compared to the automatic's 22 mpg.

The Rover 3500 was also assembled by Leykor in South Africa. A high compression version was added in 1971, with a high compression version of the V8 producing 184 hp (137 kW). The P6 continued in South African assembly until being phased out during 1975; the SD1 arrived in 1977.

== Series II ==
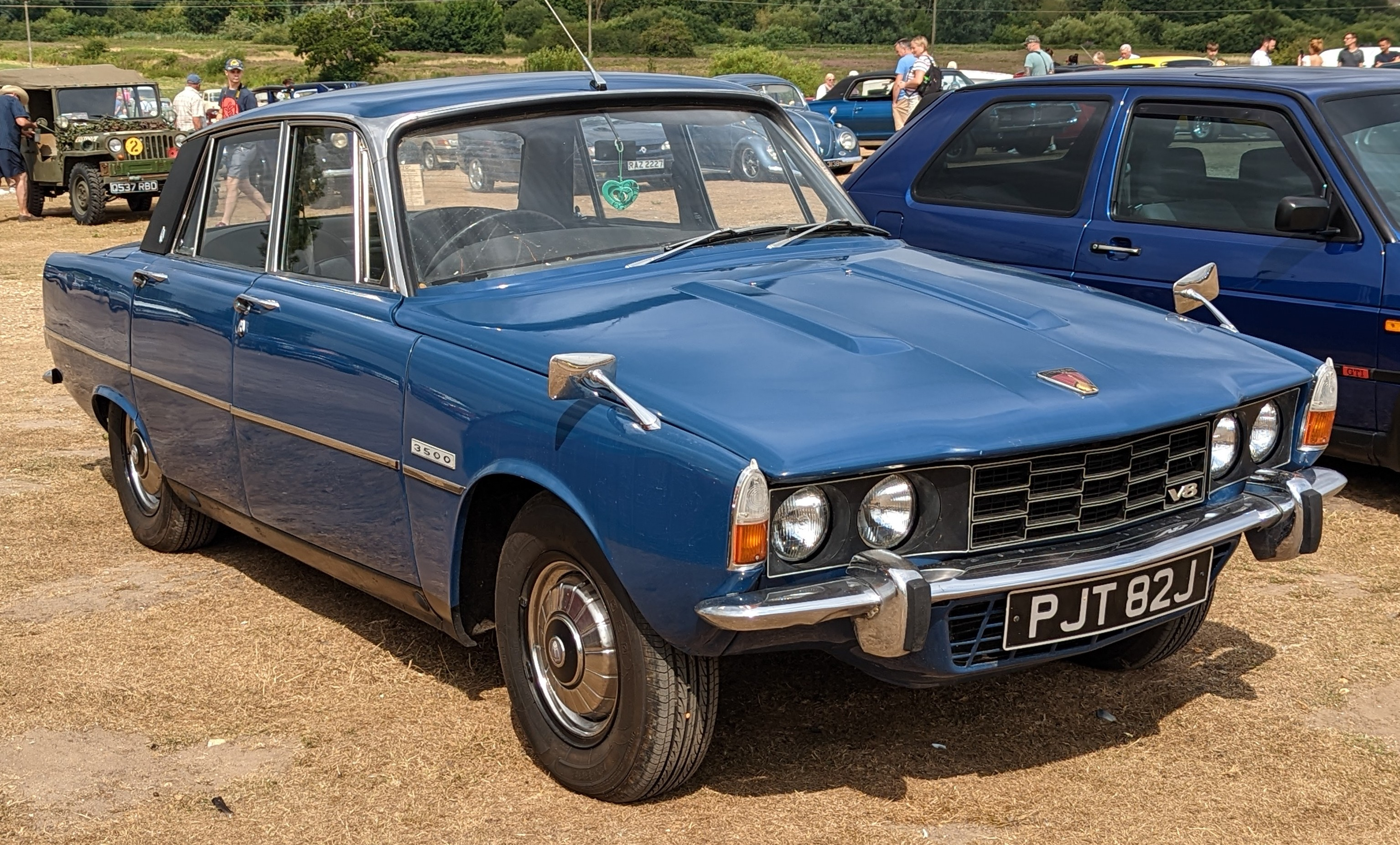
Series II Rover 3500 on a K plate (1971–1972), showing the new style bonnet

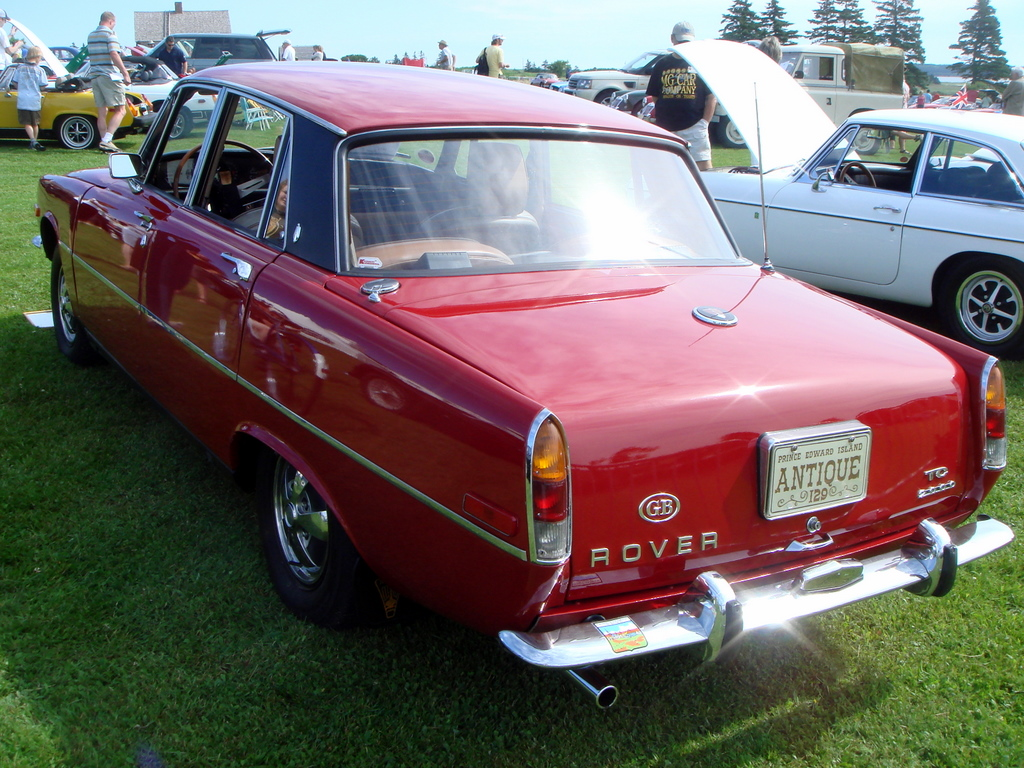
Rover 2000 TC rear view

The Series II, or Mark II as it was actually named by Rover, was launched in 1970. All variants carried the battery in the boot and had new exterior fixtures such as a plastic front air intake (to replace the alloy version), new bonnet pressings (with V8 blips even for the 4-cylinder-engined cars) and new rear lights. The interior of the 3500 and 2000TC versions was updated with new instrumentation with circular gauges and rotary switches. The old-style instrumentation with a linear speedometer and toggle switches continued on the 2000SC versions.

The final years of the Rover P6 coincided with production problems at British Leyland. This was highlighted in August 1975 when Drive, the magazine of the British Automobile Association awarded a trophy to a Rover 3500 as the worst new car in England. It reported that a Rover 3500 purchased in 1974 had covered 6,000 miles (9,700 kilometres) during its first six months, during which period it had consumed three engines, two gearboxes, two clutch housings and needed a complete new set of electrical cables. The car had spent 114 of its first 165 days in a workshop. The runner-up prize in this rogue's gallery was awarded to an Austin Allegro with forty faults reported over ten months, and a Triumph Stag came in third. The story was picked up and reported in other publications, not only domestically but also in Germany, at the time Europe's largest national car market and an important target export market for the company.

=== 2200 ===
Rover 2200SC/2200TC
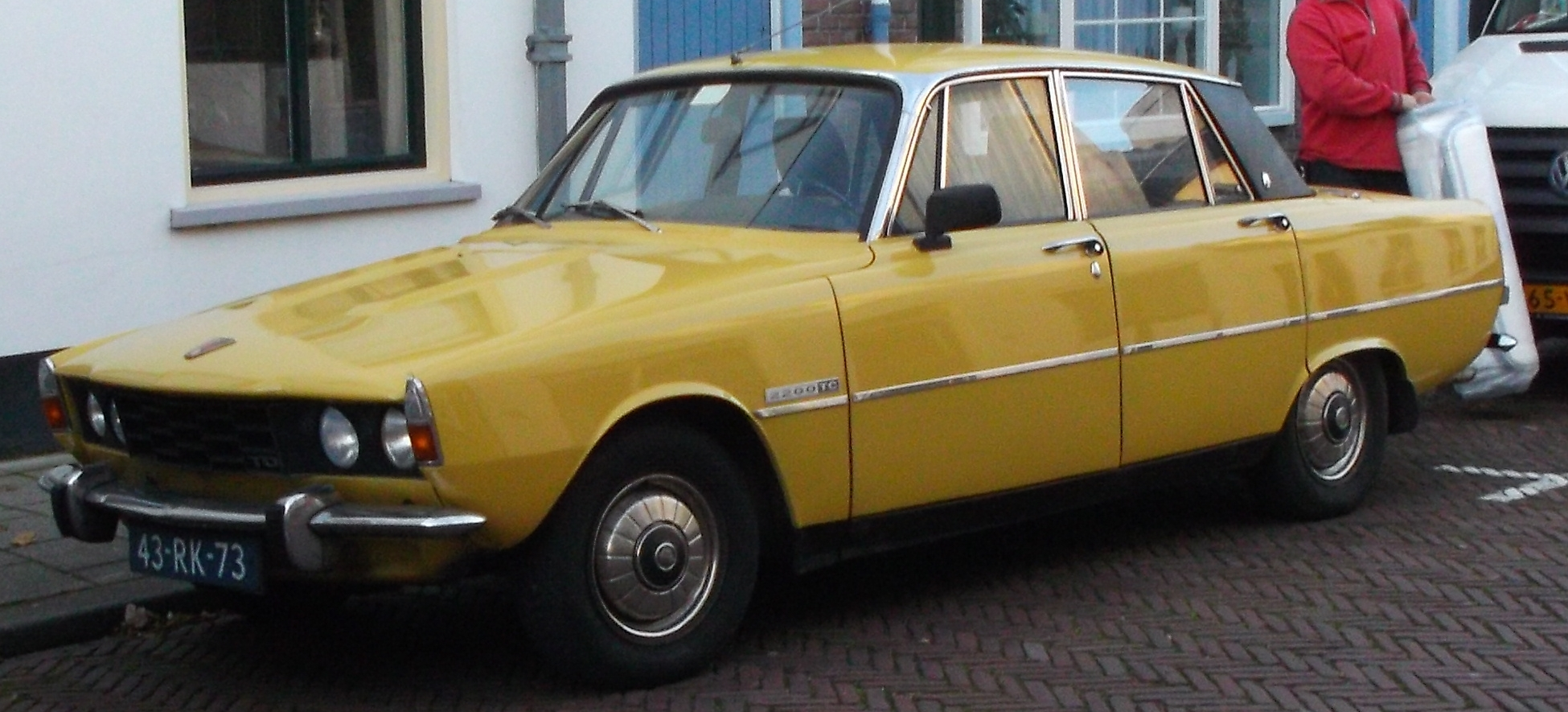
- Rover 2200TC, Dutch registration

Overview
- Production: 1973–1977; 32,370 produced

Powertrain
- Engine: 2.2 L I4

In order to try to meet exhaust emission requirements particularly in California various changes were made to carburation and exhaust. The engine capacity was increased ten percent to increase torque and minimise the loss in reported power output and the 2200 SC and 2200 TC replaced the 2000 SC and TC. Announced in October 1973 and produced through to the early part of 1977, it used a 2.2 L (2,205 cc or 134.6 cu in) version of the 2000 engine with the bore increased from 85.7 to 90.5 mm (3.4 to 3.6 in): the stroke was unchanged at 85.7 mm. Gear boxes on the manual transmission cars were strengthened to cope with the increased low speed torque. Nominal output fell to 98 and 115 bhp (73 and 86 kW; 99 and 117 PS) for the SC (single carburettor) and TC (twin carburettor) versions respectively, on the road largely concealed by the improved torque.

The last 2200 came off the production line on 19 March 1977, a left-hand drive export version that was then converted to right-hand drive by Tourist Trophy Garage, Farnham. The 2200 originally fitted Pirelli Cinturato 165HR14 tyres (CA67) when leaving the factory.

== NADA models ==
Rover made an attempt to break into the North American market with the P6, beginning with the Rover 2000 TC. This version was called the NADA (North American Dollar Area) model. The cars were not popular with American buyers, and a large number ended up being diverted to Continental Europe instead as they were already left-hand drive. Rover discontinued selling the P6 in North America in 1971: in that year the US had taken fewer than 1,500 Rovers. Several UK cars also ended up with single scoops on their bonnets in an attempt to use up the surplus parts from the now defunct export models. The company told their US dealers that modifying the P6 to meet new US federal safety and pollution requirements would be prohibitively expensive, while experience elsewhere suggests that the Rover's four-cylinder engine was particularly hard to adapt for reduced octane lead-free fuels without an unacceptable reduction in the car's performance.

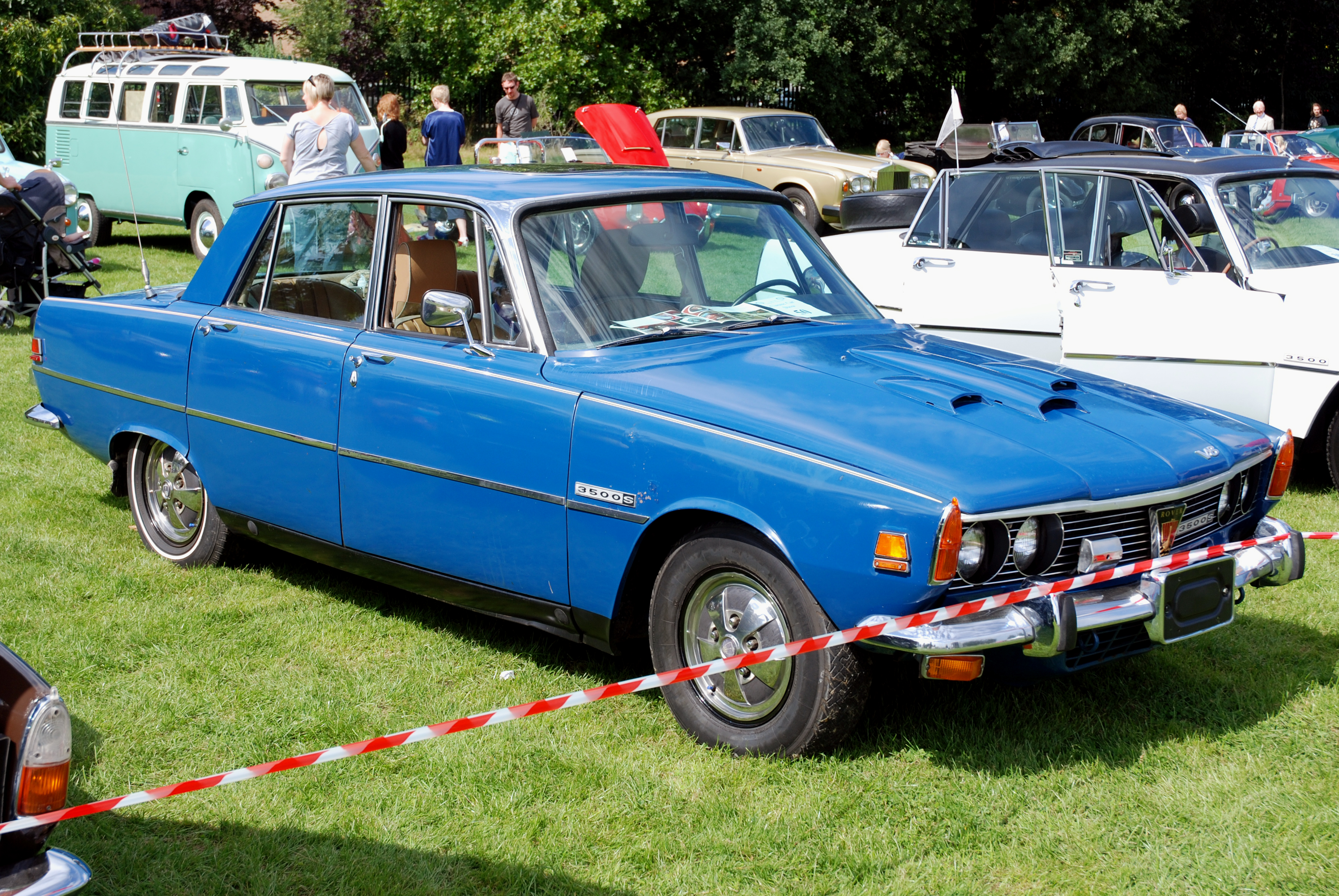
Federalized Rover 3500S "NADA"

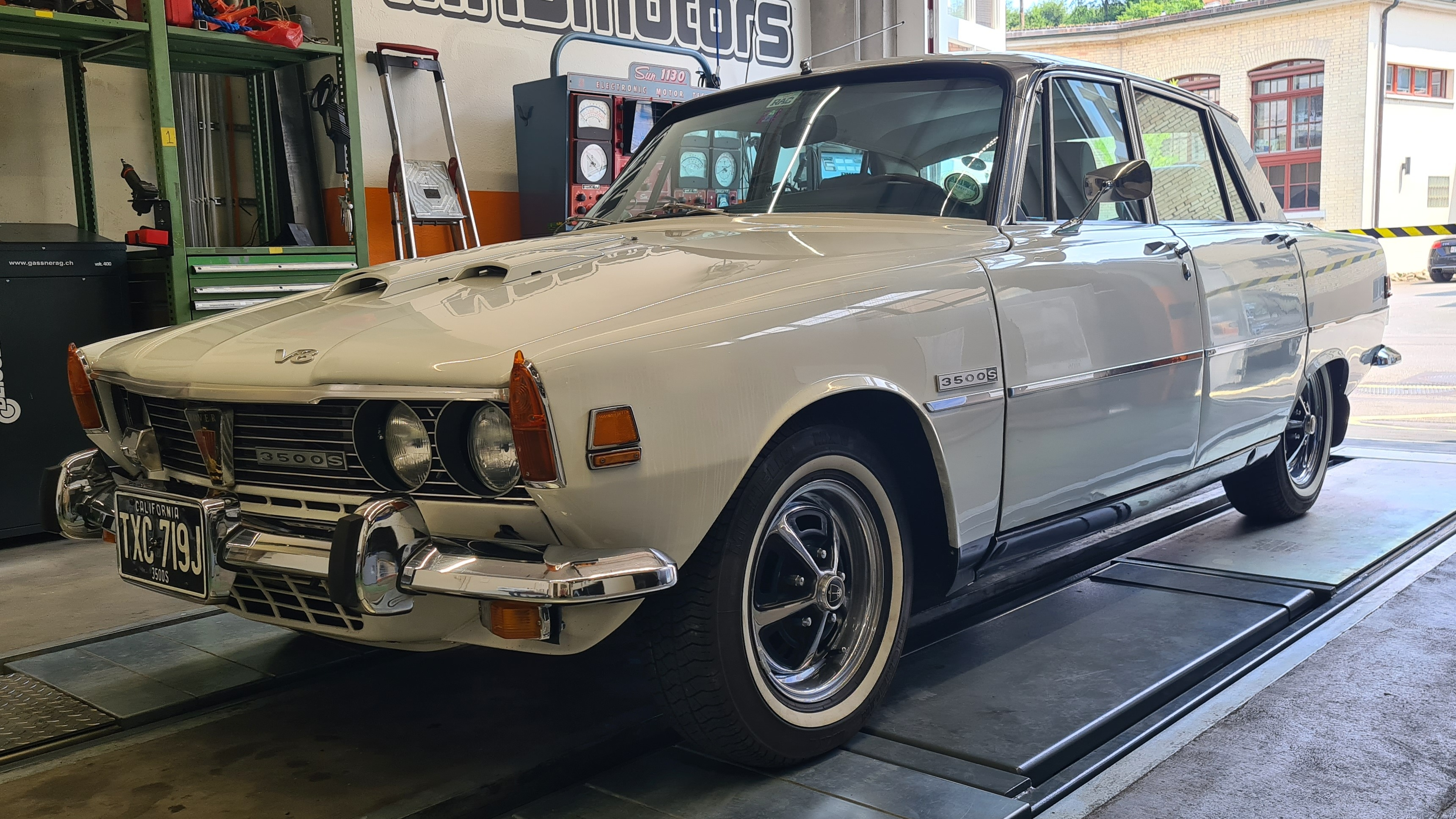
NADA specification Rover P6 - with side markers

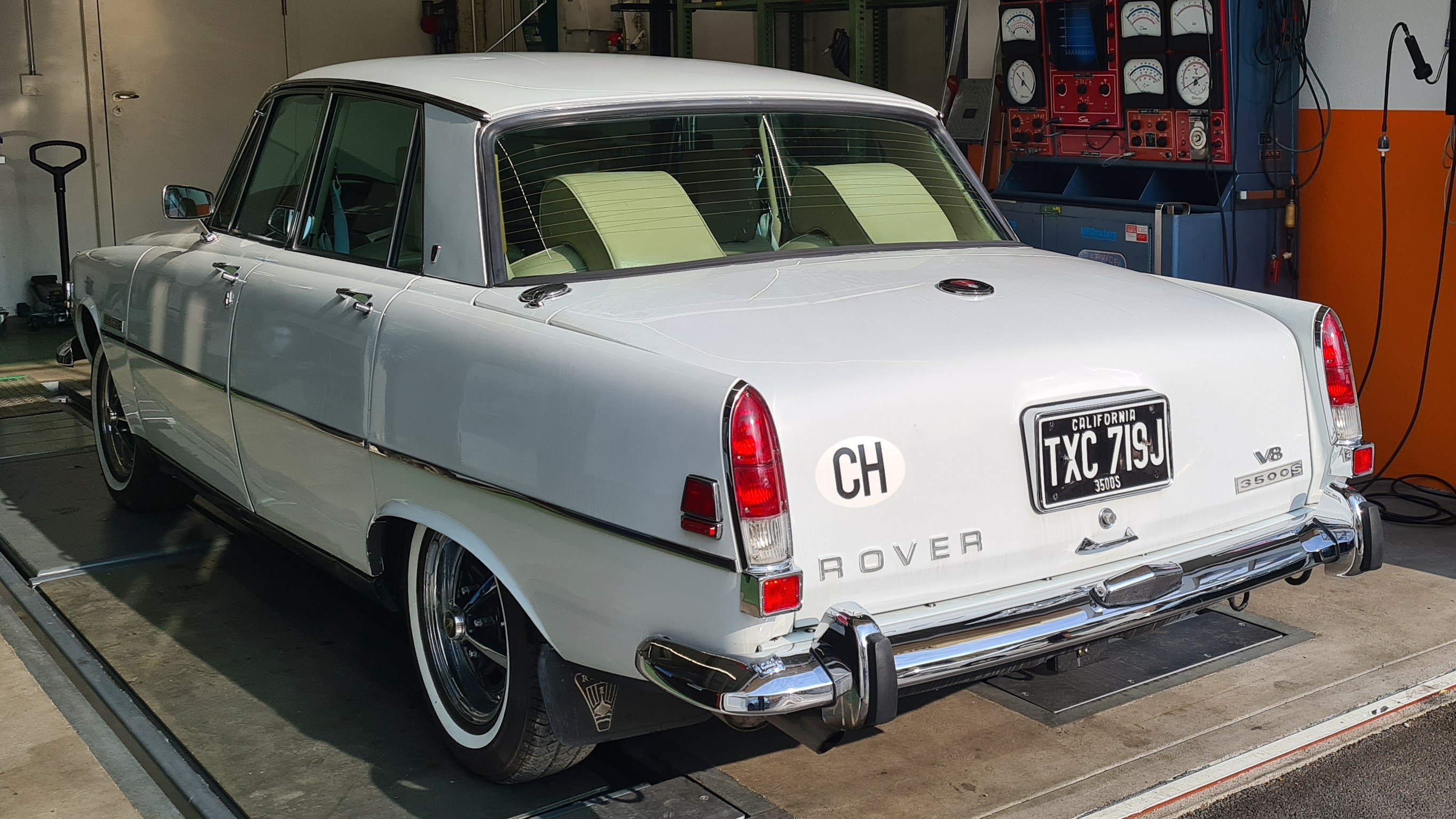
Rear view showing the federal spec wraparound bumpers

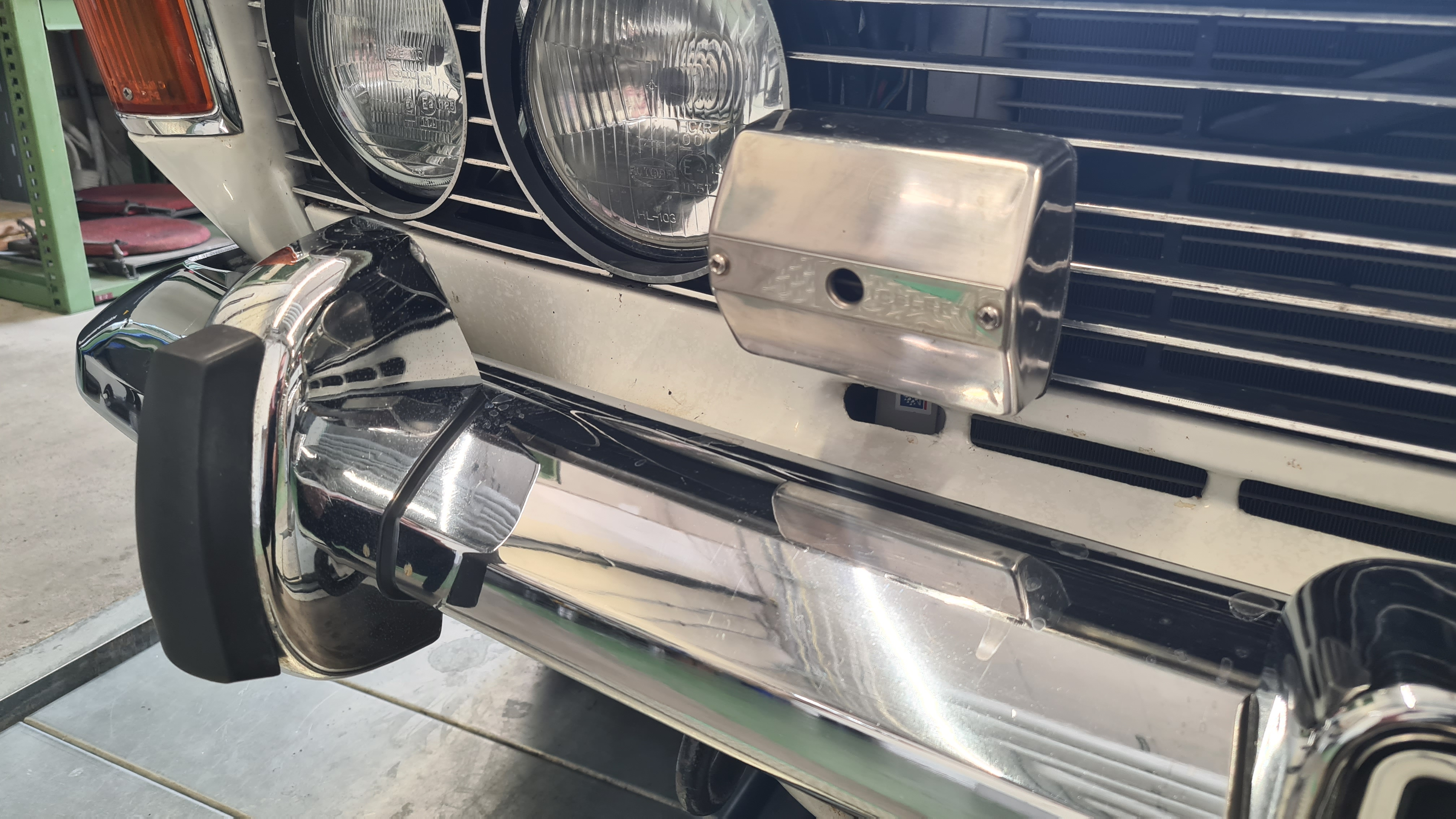
The Icelert system warned the driver of falling outside temperatures and the possibility of ice forming on the road

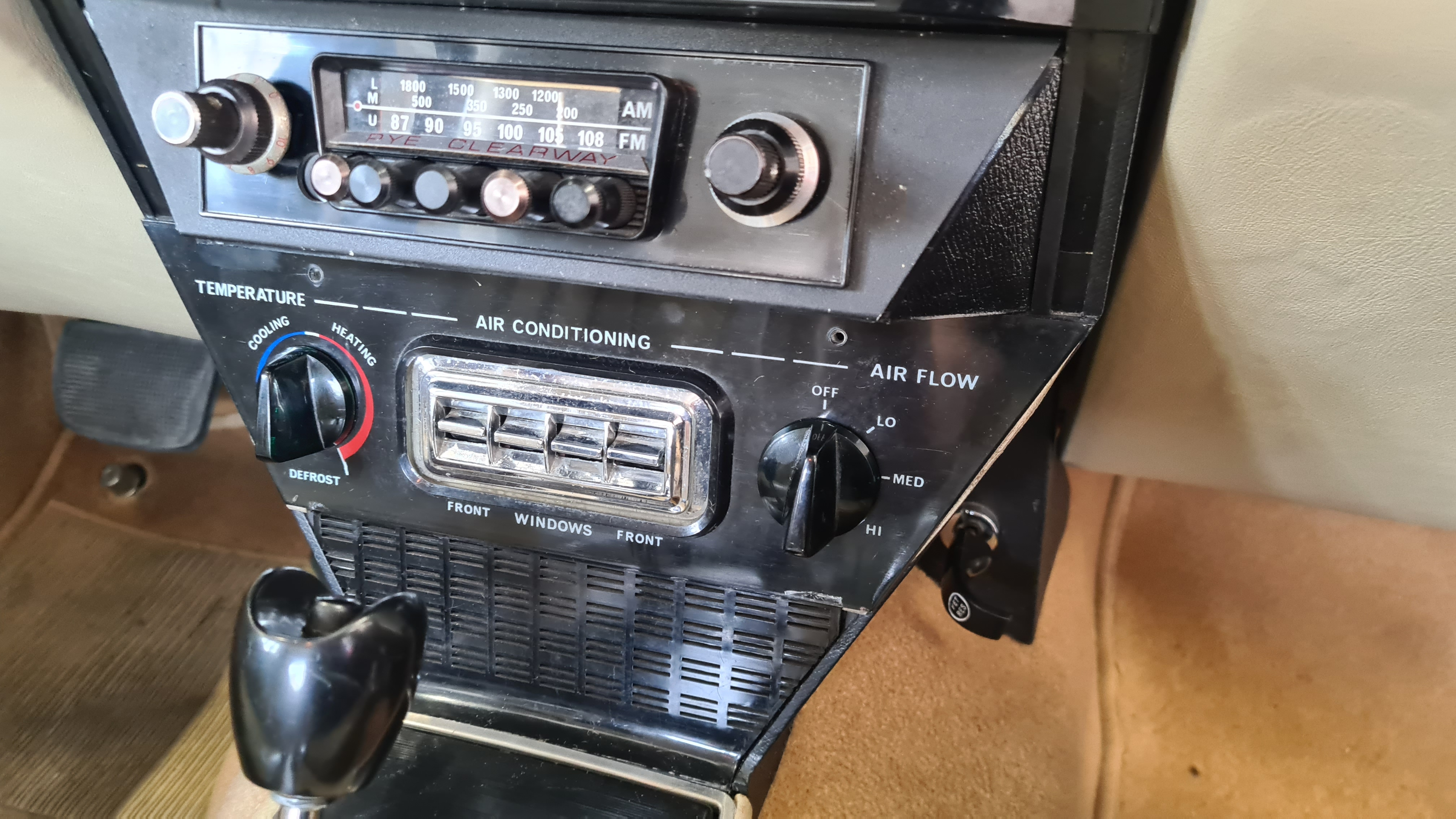
Air conditioning and electric windows

== New Zealand production ==
The Rover 3500 was assembled in New Zealand from 1971 to 1976, at New Zealand Motor Corporation's assembly plant in Stoke, Nelson, alongside the Triumph 2000/2500, Jaguar XJ6 (Series 1 and 2) and Land Rover (Series 3). A notable factor about the NZMC-built Rover 3500 was that it was exported from New Zealand – 2,400 were shipped to Australia for sale there, in return for CKD kits of the Leyland P76.

== Last production model ==
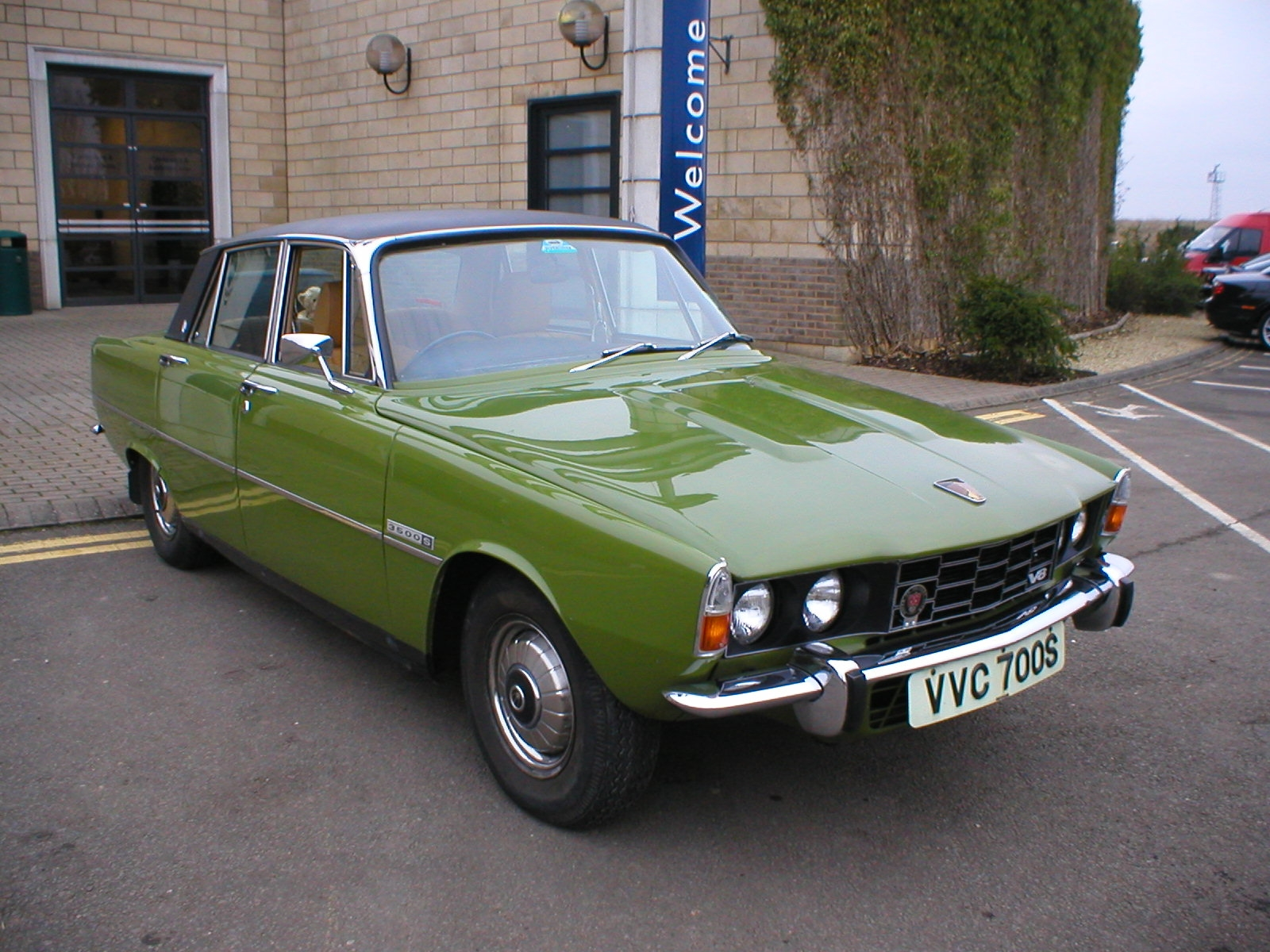
The last Rover P6, a 3500S

After a production run of almost 14 years, the last Rover P6 off the production line, registered VVC 700S, was built on 19 March 1977, when it was phased out in favour of the Rover SD1. The SD1 was initially only available with a 3.5 V8 engine from its June 1976 launch, with the 2.3 and 2.6 six-cylinder units joining the range during 1977.

This car was first sent, in August 1977, to the Leyland Historic Vehicle collection, then to Donington Park until 1980, when it was moved to Syon Park along with the rest of the collection, which became the British Motor Industry Heritage Trust Collection. It remained an exhibit at Syon until 1990, when the collection moved to Studley Castle (then owned by Rover) and went into storage until 1993.

In 1993, the collection then moved to its new home, The British Motor Industry Heritage Trust site at Gaydon, now known as the Heritage Motor Centre. VVC 700S was on display until 2003 when it sold at the Bonhams sale of Rover-owned items.

In 2006, VVC 700S revisited Gaydon for the first time since the sale and is still in original condition having never been restored. The car came out of the collection having only ever covered 12,300 miles (19,800 km). The last MOT expired in August 2010.

== Legacy ==
The Rover chair, designed by Ron Arad in 1981, incorporated seats from P6 cars.

The P6 was replaced by the Rover SD1.

== Scale models ==
- Corgi Toys; No. 252 (production 1963–66), Rover 2000, approximately O scale (1:44).
- Corgi Toys; Nos. 275 and 281 (production 1968–70 and 1971–73), Rover 2000 TC, approximately O-scale (1:44).
- Corgi Toys; No 322 (production 1965–66), Rover 2000 "Monte-Carlo Rally" approximately O-scale (1:44).
- Hot Wheels; No. 62 (production 2022–23), Rover P6 Group 2, approximately S scale (1:64).
