= Rover chair =

Chair designed by Ron Arad

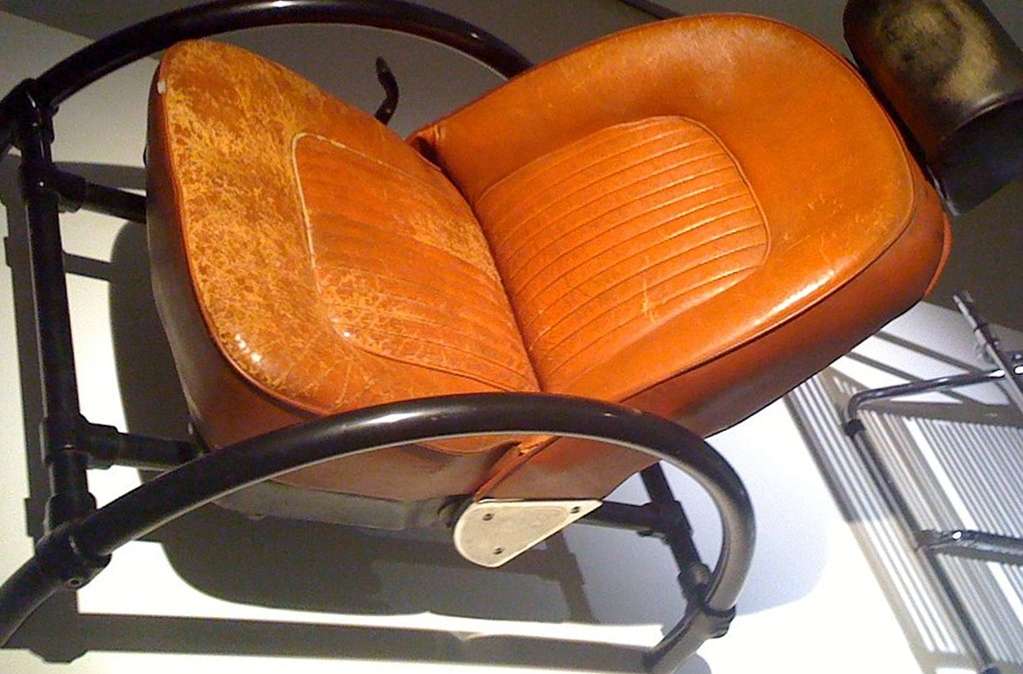
- Chair exhibited at the Barbican Art Gallery, London, 2010
- Designer: Ron Arad
- Date: 1981 (United Kingdom)
- Materials: Steel frame, leather car seat
- Style / tradition: Postmodernist
- Sold by: Vitra (Switzerland)
- Height: 78 cm (31 in)
- Width: 69 cm (27 in)
- Depth: 92 cm (36 in)

The Rover chair is the first piece of furniture designed by industrial designer Ron Arad. It was made in 1981 as a fusion of two readymades and launched Arad's career. The chair is a postmodernist design, combining a car seat with a structural tubing frame.

== History ==
Arad had left his employment with a firm of architects, and obtained the parts to make the chair from a scrapyard in Chalk Farm, London. The readymade chair was the first piece of furniture he produced.

The red leather seat is from a Rover P6 and is housed in a black painted curved steel frame made from a Kee Klamp milking stall. Later exhibited pieces had epoxy lacquered frames. The frame provides both feet and arm rests.

The Rover P6 is sometimes known as the 2000. Some reports of the chair refer to it being made using seats from the 200, P5 or 90.

Furniture maker Joe Hall visited Arad's Covent Garden shop in the mid-1980s and then collaborated with him to make further chairs. Hall scoured the country's scrapyards for P6 seats, which cost £5–15 each and were in excellent condition.

The chairs sold for £99 each in 1981, about three times the production cost. Original chairs made by Arad's One Off company have been auctioned by Christie's, Bonhams, Bonhams & Butterfield and Göteborgs Auktionsverk. Hundreds have been produced since 1981, fetching thousands of pounds at auctions at the turn of the century. The success of the chair, which has become an icon, launched Arad's career.

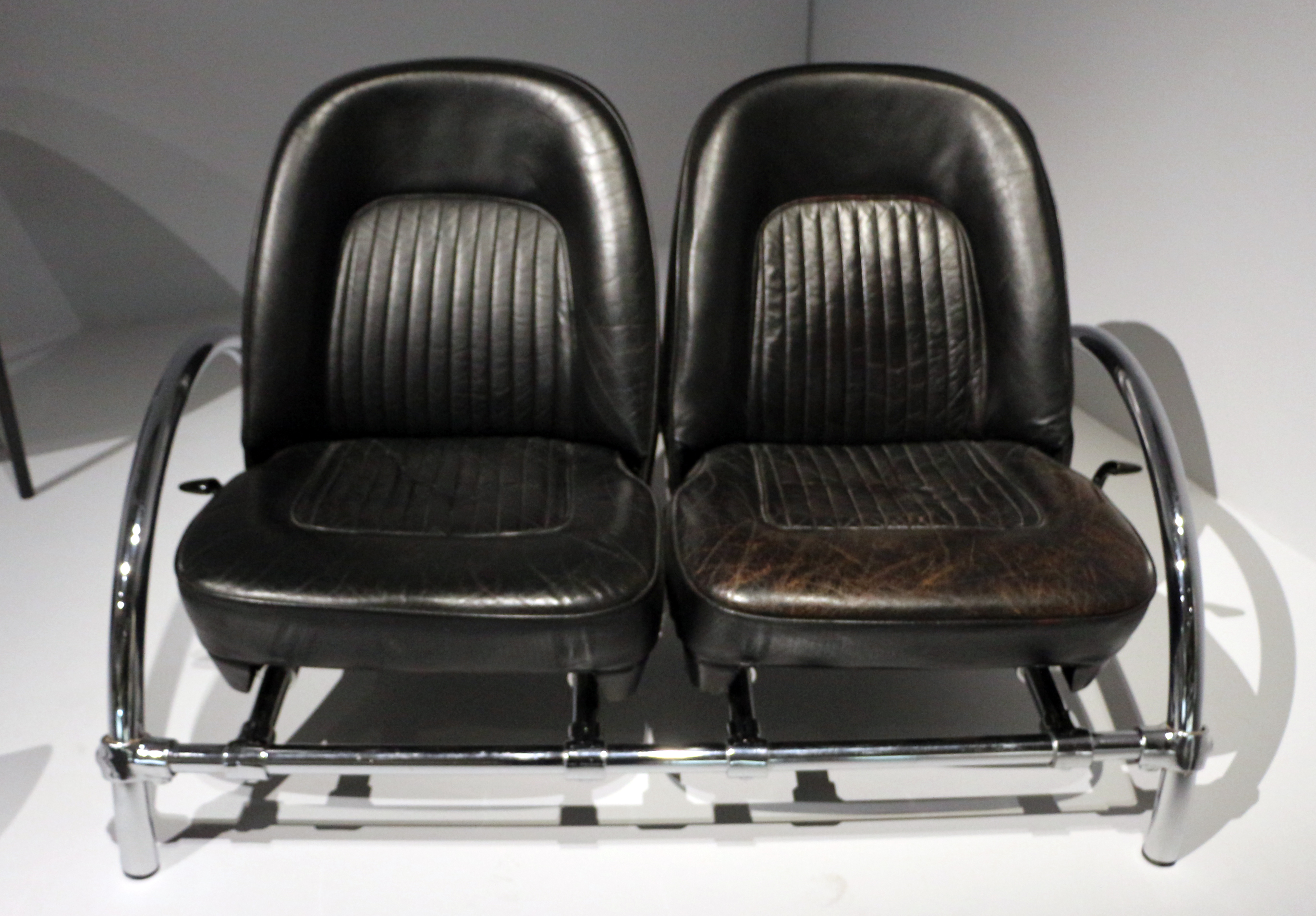
Rover two-seater (1985)

The chairs were produced by One Off until 1989, and in 2008 were being produced by Vitra in two models. A two-seater version was auctioned in 2011.

== Reception ==
Fashion designer Jean Paul Gaultier bought six chairs in 1981. They also attracted the attention of furniture manufacturer Vitra. The chair is recognised as a postmodernist design.

A presenter of BBC Television's Top Gear sat on such a chair from 1988. The chair also featured in a television advertisement for an unrelated product. Arad's own children were breast-fed on the chair.

== Exhibitions ==
The chair has formed part of various exhibitions, including those at London's Design Museum, Barbican Art Gallery, Timothy Taylor Gallery, Paris's Centre Pompidou and New York's Museum of Modern Art.
