= Saâdane Afif =

French conceptual artist (born 1970)

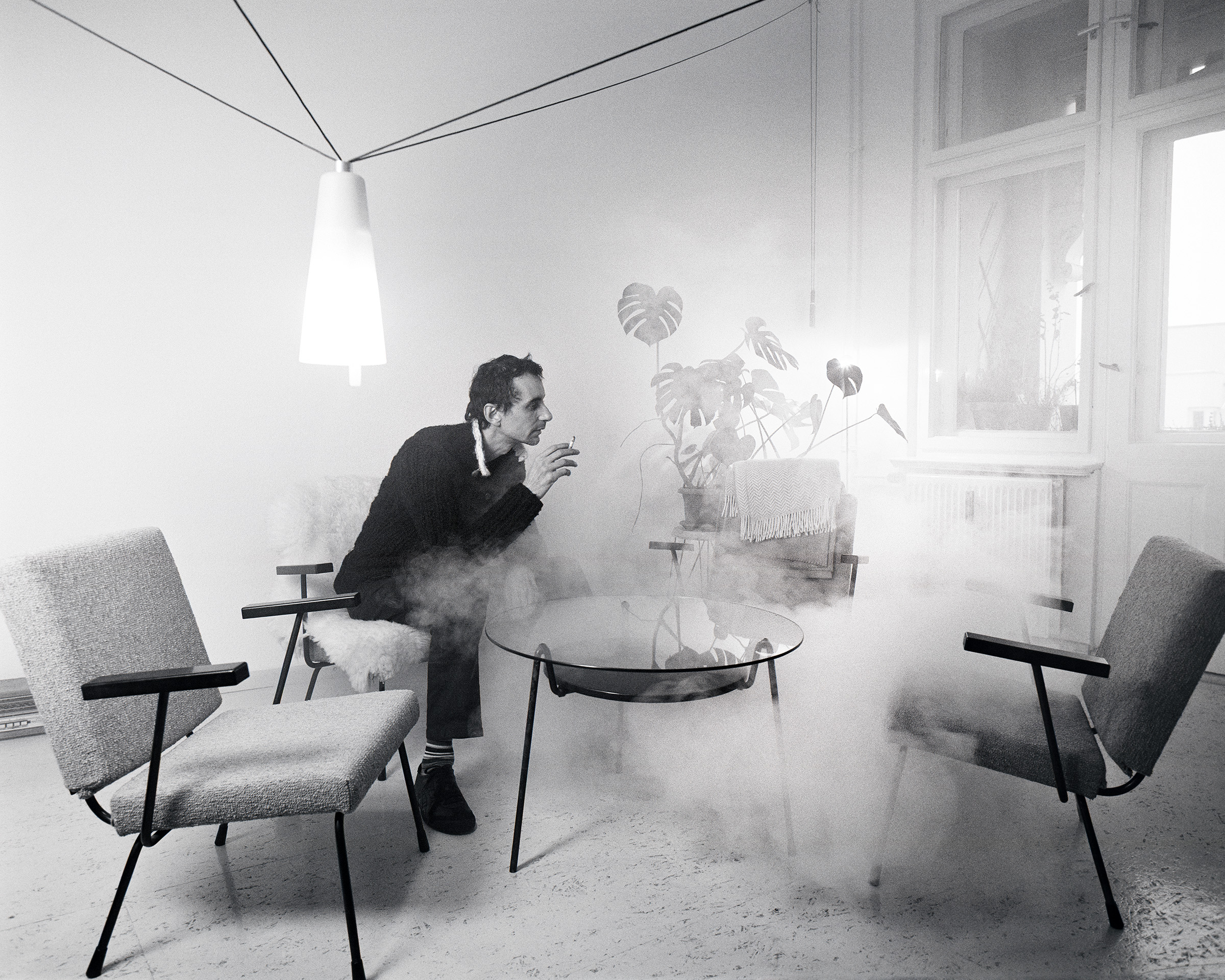
- Saâdane Afif photographed by Oliver Mark, Berlin 2010
- Born: 1970

Saâdane Afif (born 1970 in Vendôme, Loir-et-Cher Département, France) is a French conceptual artist.

== Life and career ==
Saâdane Afif graduated from the School of Fine Arts in Bourges and later received his 1998 postgraduate degree from the School of Fine Arts in Nantes (École des Beaux Arts). In 2001, he was in residence at the Villa Arson International Art School of Nice (France); in 2002, he was in residence at the Villa Médicis in Glasgow (Scotland). In 2003, he moved to Berlin, where he currently lives and works. Afif's work has been exhibited at many venues, including the Museum Folkwang (Essen, Germany) in 2004. In 2006, he was awarded the International Prize for Contemporary Art of the Fondation Prince Pierre de Monaco at the Centre Pompidou in Paris. In 2009, he received the Marcel Duchamp Prize; as a result of winning this prize, he presented his artwork in the exhibition "Anthology of black humour" at Space 315, Centre Pompidou, Paris from September 2010 until January 2011. In 2011, he was the 46th most influential person in the French art world, according to the March issue of Eye Magazine.

== Art ==
Defined as ‘post-conceptual’, Saâdane Afif's work focuses on interpretation, exchange and circulation. He works in various media (performance, objects, sculptures, text, posters and works in neon). The complex procedures he uses are not categorised under any specific discipline. All of his works are subject to a continuous process of alteration. He integrates elements of art history, music, poetry and dance into his work, sometimes inviting authors to write texts based on existing artworks for other artists to set to music or use in drama. Afif himself refuses to appear in public, preferring to direct from afar.

In 2008, Afif began a project entitled the Fountain Archive. This currently contains about 500 images of Marcel Duchamp’s porcelain urinal. In this project, Afif collects and archives every single publication in which he finds a reproduction of Duchamp's urinal. As a found object, every page containing a picture of the urinal is torn out and then carefully framed. The frame, used both for its preservative and decorative purposes, is also part of the artistic process. Every step of the archiving process follows meticulous rules which form a part of this artistic process. Each new archived image has its own inventory card, which acts as a certificate of authenticity. Publications which discuss Afif's project (and therefore reproduce images of Duchamp's urinal) are also included in the Fountain Archive project: these, though, are treated as special objects as they constitute a historical echo of the original work. This is the only exception to the generally strict rule that each photograph can only be included in the Fountain Archive once.

In April 2012, an exhibition took place at the Museum für Moderne Kunst in Frankfurt. The MMK Zollamt was an exhibition outside the main exhibition space, presenting Saâdane Afif's "Anthologie de l’humour noir". It highlighted some aspects of African influence in a new and unusual light, since this was also connected to modern French art and literature. The centrepiece was a coffin made in Ghana which plays an ode to the deceased. The shape of the coffin is a reference to the Centre Pompidou and it was titled Humour Noir (a translation of "black humour"). This phrase was made famous by André Breton.

=== Lyrics ===
In 2004, as part of his exhibition Melancholic Beat at the Museum Folkwang in Essen, Saâdane Afif requested artist Lili Reynaud-Dewar to write lyrics relatedto the four works exhibited: Brume, Everyday, Black Spirit and Blue Time. This experience introduced a process that would radically affect his artistic practice. These song commissions follow very precise rules: Afif sends the authors a document in which he tells them about the art piece related to the song (title, form, context of appearance, intentions, sketches). In return, the song will have to keep the same title and a link with the object described. The texts are then presented on the walls, alongside the works to which they refer, imitating the presentation notes that usually punctuate the exhibition itinerary. Their poetic register, however, determined by the commission, consciously distances them from any didactic attention.

Titled Lyrics, the series now includes more than two hundred texts written by around one hundred people, part of which has been gathered in the book Paroles co-published by the WIELS Contemporary Art Centre and Triangle Books in Belgium in 2018. These mutant objects at the crossroads of two imaginations, both emanating from and extending the meaning of a given work, will then become essential material for the artist's work.

== Exhibitions ==
- 2023 : The Coalman, Galerie Mehdi Chouakri, Berlin, Germany
- 2023 : In Search of the Heptahedron, Galerie Mehdi Chouakri, Berlin, Germany
- 2023: Enigma, Galerie Mehdi Chouakri, Berlin, Germany
- 2022 : The Fountain Archives [Index], Galerie Michèle Didier, Paris, France
- 2022 : Broken Music Vol. 2, 70 Years of Records and Sound Works by Artists, Hamburger Bahnhof – Nationalgalerie der Gegenwart, Berlin, Germany
- 2022 : Ridiculously Yours! Art, Awkwardness and Enthusiasm, Bundeskunsthalle Bonn, Germany
- 2021 : The Fountain Archives and Beyond..., Fundació Antoni Tàpies, Barcelona, Spain
- 2021: Dwarf Lift Dwarf sings Pirates’ Who’s Who, Beaufort Biennale, Belgium
- 2019 : Das Heptaeder, Galerie Mehdi Chouakri, Berlin, Germany
- 2019: The Fountain Archives, Fundacion Jumex, Mexico, Mexico
- 2019 : The Fairytale Recordings, Lafayette Anticipations, Paris, France
- 2019 : Der Traum der Bibliothek, Museum für Gegenwartskunst Siegen, Siegen, Germany
- 2018 : Musiques pour Tuyauterie, mor charpentier, Paris, France
- 2018 : This Is Ornemental, Kunsthalle Wien, Vienna, Austria
- 2018 : Paroles, Wiels, Brussels, Belgium
- 2018 : Black Chords, Le Guess Who Festival, Utrecht, The Netherlands
- 2018 : RE-SET: Appropriation and Transformation in Music and Art since 1900, Museum Tinguely, Basel, Switzerland
- 2018 : The Reservoir of Modernism, Museum Liechtenstein, Liechtenstein
- 2018 : Posters, Frac Normandie Rouen, Sotteville-lès-Rouen, France
- 2017 : Ici., Leopold-Hoesch-Museum & Papiermuseum Düren, Düren, Germany
- 2017 : Là-bas., La Panacée, Montpellier, France
- 2017 : The Fountain Archives, Nouveau Musée National de Monaco, Monaco, Monaco
- 2017 : The Fairytale Recordings, Frac Franche-Comté, Besançon, France
- 2017 : The Fountain Archives 2008-2017, Centre Pompidou, Paris, France
- 2017 : Performance! The collection of the Centre Pompidou, Tripostal, Lille, France
- 2017 : Oh les Beaux Jours, une esthétique des moyens disponibles, 9th Biennale of Ottignies-Louvain-la-Neuve, Belgium
- 2016 : Quoi ? - L'Éternité, Atelier Hermès, Seoul, South Korea
- 2016 : Vice de Forme: Das Kabarett, SCORES - Musical Works by Visual Artists, Hamburger Bahnhof, Berlin, Germany
- 2016 : Mount Moon Takes Monte Carlo, Nuit Blanche de Monaco, Monaco
- 2016 : Parler en langues, Nuit Blanche Paris, Ecole Nationale Supérieure des Beaux-Arts, Paris, France
- 2015 : Das Ende der Welt, Museum für Naturkunde, Berlin, Germany
- 2015 : Political Populism, Kunsthalle Wien, Vienna, Austria
- 2015 : Her Ghost Friend, Three Tokyo Sessions, Tokyo Art Meeting VI – "TOKYO" - Sensing the Cultural Magma of the Metropolis, MOT, Tokyo, Japan
- 2015 : Threads: Fantasmagoria about Distance, Kaunas Biennale, Lithuania
- 2015 : 6th Moscow Biennale of Contemporary Art, Moscow, Russia
- 2015 : The Laguna’s Tribute, All the World’s Futures, 56th International Art Exhibition, Venice Biennale, Venice, Italy
- 2014 : Là-bas., 8th Berlin Biennale, Berlin, Germany
- 2014 : Là-bas., Kunsthaus Glarus, Switzerland
- 2014 : Ici., Günther-Peill-Stiftung am Leopold-Hoesch-Museum & Papiermuseum Düren, Düren, Germany
- 2014 : Affiches & Fontaines, Xavier Hufkens, Brussels, Belgium
- 2014 : Blue Times, Kunsthalle Wien, Vienna, Austria
- 2014 : Souvenirs: Leçon de Géométrie, Where are we now?, 5th Marrakech Biennale, Marrakech, Morocco
- 2014 : Sept notes sur le travail de Peter Roehr, Mouse On Mars – 21 AGAIN Festival, Hebbel Am Ufer, Berlin, Germany
- 2013 : Blue Time, Blue Time, Blue Time..., Institut d'Art Contemporain, Villeurbanne, France
- 2013 : Sept notes sur le travail de Peter Roehr (with Peter Roehr), Galerie Mehdi Chouakri, Berlin, Germany
- 2013 : Mount Moon, The Basel Tour, Liste 18, Basel, Switzerland
- 2013 : The Fairytale Recordings, WWTBD – What Would Thomas Bernhard Do, Kunsthalle Wien, Vienna, Austria
- 2013 : The Present Order is the Disorder of the Future, Museum Kurhaus Kleve, Germany
- 2013 : Héritages, Re:emerge-Towards a New Cultural Cartography, 11th Sharjah Biennale, Sharjah, United Arab Emirates
- 2012 : Anthologie de l’Humour Noir, Museum für Moderne Kunst, Frankfurt, Germany
- 2012 : L’S BELLS – The Busker of the Gray Line, Ludlow 38, New York, United States of America
- 2012 : Made in Germany 2: Internationale Kunst in Deutschland, Sprengel Museum, Hannover, Germany
- 2012 : Art and the City, Public Space Project, Zurich, Switzerland
- 2011 : The Fairytale Recordings, Schinkel Pavillon, Berlin, Germany
- 2011 : Echoes, Centre Culturel Suisse, Paris, France
- 2011 : Melanchotopia, Witte de With Center for Contemporary Art, Rotterdam, The Netherlands
- 2011 : Meeting Points 6: Locus Agonistess – Practices and Logics of the Civic, Argos, Brussels, Belgium
- 2011 : Meeting Points 6: Locus Agonistess – Practices and Logics of the Civic, Beirut Art Center, Beirut, Lebanono
- 2010 : A Lecture, A Recording & Few Witnesses, OPA Oficina para Proyectos de Arte, Guadalajara, Mexico
- 2010 : Saâdane Afif – Anthologie de l’Humour Noir, Centre Pompidou, Paris, France
- 2010 : Morality, Witte de With Center for Contemporary Art, Rotterdam, The Netherlands
- 2010 : ACT VII: Of Facts and Fables, Witte de With Center for Contemporary Art, Rotterdam, The Netherlands
- 2010 : La Carte d’après Nature. An Artist’s Selection by Thomas Demand, Villa Paloma, Monaco, Monaco
- 2009 : Feedback, EACC Espai d’Art Contemporani de Castelló, Castelló, Spain
- 2009 : Vice de Forme : In Search of Melodies, Galerie Michel Rein, Paris, France
- 2008 : TWO..., FRAC Fonds Régional d'Art Contemporain Basse-Normandie, Caen, France
- 2008 : ONE, FRAC Fonds Régional d'Art Contemporain Pays de la Loire, Carquefou, France
- 2008 : Technical Specifications, Witte de With Center for Contemporary Art, Rotterdam, The Netherlands
- 2007 : 58:22 & Some Words, Galerie Mehdi Chouakri, Berlin, Germany
- 2007 : Airs de Paris, Centre Pompidou, Paris, France
- 2007 : Black Chords, Documenta 12, Kassel, Germany
- 2006 : Power Chords, Fondation Prince Pierre de Monaco, Monaco, Monaco
- 2006 : La Répétition, Galleria Maze, Turin, Italy
- 2006 : Power Chords, Cité de la Musique, Paris, France
- 2006 : Expats/Clandestines, Wiels, Brussels, Belgium
- 2005 : Lyrics, Palais de Tokyo, Paris, France
- 2005 : One Million BPM, Cimaise et portique, Albi, France
- 2005 : 3rd Tirana Biennale, Tirana, Albania
- 2005 : Down at the Rock’nRoll Club, 1st Moscow Biennale for Contemporary Art, Lenin Museum, Moscow, Russia
- 2004 : Melancholic Beat, Museum Folkwang, Essen, Germany
- 2004 : Playlist, Palais de Tokyo, Paris, France
- 2001 : Mise à flot, Le Creux de l’Enfer, Thiers, France
- 2001 : Parallèle Parallaxe Paradoxe, Maison Populaire, Montreuil, France

== Awards and grants ==
- 2015 : Prix Meurice pour l'art contemporain, Paris, France
- 2012 : Prize of Günther-Peill-Stiftung, Düren, Germany
- 2009 : Marcel Duchamp Prize, Paris, France
- 2006 : Prix International d’Art Contemporain de la Fondation Prince Pierre de Monaco, Monaco
- 2002 : Award of Villa Medicis Hors les Murs (Residence) in Glasgow, Scotland
- 2001 : Scholarship (Residence), Villa Arson, Nice, France

== Collections ==
Saâdane Afif's work can be found in numerous museums and public collections around the world. Selected museum collections include the Paris Museum of Modern Art; the Centre Pompidou; the New National Museum of Monaco; the Kunstmuseum Liechtenstein in Vaduz; the National Museum of Modern Art of Tokyo, Japan; the Haus Konstruktiv Museum in Zurich, Switzerland; the Museum für Moderne Kunst in Frankfurt am Main, Germany; the MUDAM, Contemporary Art Museum in Luxembourg; and the Institut d'art contemporain in Villeurbanne.

Selected public collections include numerous regional contemporary art funds ("fonds régional d'art contemporain, FRAC"), notably those of the Île-de-France, Poitou-Charentes, Champagne-Ardenne and Pays de la Loire regions, as well as the FRAC Provence-Alpes-Côte d'Azur; the collection of the Lafayette Anticipations foundation; the Centre national des arts plastiques (CNAP) and the Kadist foundation.

== Bibliography ==
- Eva Huttenlauch: "Everything must be scandalous", in: Saâdane Afif. Another Anthology of Black Humor, published by Susanne Gaensheimer and Eva Huttenlauch, Verlag für Moderne Kunst, Nürnberg 2012.
- Elena Filipovic, Xavier Hufkens: Sâadane Afif. Fontaines. Triangle Books, 2014, ISBN 978-2-930777-05-4.
- Valentina Vlasic: Saâdane Afif, in: The Present Order is the Disorder of the Future, Schriftenreihe Museum Kurhaus Kleve – Ewald Mataré-Sammlung Nr. 62, Freundeskreis Museum Kurhaus und Koekkoek-Haus Kleve e.V. (Hrsg), 2013, p. 57.
