= 3500 (disambiguation) =

3500 may refer to:

- A.D. 3500, a year in the 4th millennium CE
- 3500 BC, a year in the 4th millennium BCE
- 3500, a number in the 3000 (number) range

== Products ==
- Nokia 3500 classic, a cellphone

=== Automotive ===
- GM 3500 engine (disambiguation), several different car engines from General Motors
- Maserati 3500 GT, a sportscar
- New Venture Gear 3500 transmission, a five-gear overdrive automotive transmission
- Ram 3500, a model of pickup truck from Ram division of Stellantis
- Rover 3500 (disambiguation), several different cars from Rover

=== Rail ===
- FEVE 3500 series electric multiple unit train class
- Keisei 3500 series electric multiple unit train class
- Meitetsu 3500 series electric multiple unit train class
- NS 3500, an early-20th-century steam locomotive class
- NS 3500 (ex-SBB), a mid-20th-century steam locomotive class
- Queensland Railways 3500/3600 class, a class of electric locomotives

== Places ==
- 3500 Kobayashi, an asteroid in the Asteroid Belt, the 3500th asteroid registered
- Hawaii Route 3500, a state highway
- 3500 (District of Peqin), one of the postal codes in Albania
- Catskill High Peaks (a.k.a. The 3500s), a collection of mountains in the Catskills with peak heights above 3,500 feet (1,100 m)

== Other uses ==
- "3500", a 2015 song by Travis Scott from the album Rodeo.
- "Three-Five-Zero-Zero", an anti-war song from the stage musical Hair
- 3500 South MAX, a BRT bus line in Salt Lake County, Utah, USA
- 3500th Pilot Training Wing of the U.S. Air Force
- 3500 metre race-walk, a race walking event at the Olympics

== See also ==
- Catskill Mountain 3500 Club (aka '3500 Club'), a peakbagging organization
- USS Eastern Shore (ID-3500), a WWI U.S. Navy cargo ship
- S3500 (disambiguation)
