= Eastern Shore =

Eastern Shore may refer to:

- Regions in the Delmarva Peninsula:
  - Eastern Shore of Maryland
  - Eastern Shore of Virginia
- Eastern Shore (Nova Scotia), a region
- Eastern Shore (electoral district), a provincial electoral district in Nova Scotia
- Eastern Shore (Alabama), of Mobile Bay
- USS Eastern Shore (ID-3500), a United States Navy cargo ship in commission from 1918 to 1919
- University of Maryland Eastern Shore, University in Princess Anne, Maryland

== See also ==
- East Shore (disambiguation)
