= 5400 =

5400 or variation, may refer to:

== In general ==
- A.D. 5400, a year in the 6th millennium CE
- 5400 BC, a year in the 6th millennium BCE
- 5400, a number in the 5000 (number) range

== Electronics and computing ==
- Texas Instruments 5400 series ICs, a variant of the 7400-series integrated circuits
- Intel Pro 5400s SSD
- Intel 5400 chipset
- Power Macintosh 5400 personal computer

== Other uses ==
- 5400 (1989 CM), an asteroid in the Asteroid Belt, the 5400th asteroid registered; see List_of_minor_planets:_5001–6000
- 5400 (District of Skrapar), one of the postal codes in Albania
- BS 5400 (British Standard 5400) in bridge construction
- GWR 5400 Class, pannier steam locomotive train class
- Red Flag 5400-class locomotive
