= S3500 =

S3500 may refer to:

== Products ==
- FinePix S3500, a 2005 digital camera with a 6x optical zoom lens by FujiFilm
- COOLPIX S3500, a 2002 digital camera from Nikon
- s3500t and s3500z, two HP Pavilion Slimline desktop computer models
- DC S3500, an Intel SSD

== Other uses ==
- S3500 expressway; see List of provincial expressways of China

== See also ==
- 3500 (disambiguation)
