= X25 =

X25 may refer to:

- X.25, a telecommunications protocol suite
- X25 (New York City bus)
- Bensen X-25, an American experimental aircraft
- HMS X25, an X-class submarine
- HP Jornada X25, a PDA manufactured by Hewlett-Packard
- National Express Coach route X25
- Senova X25, a Chinese automobile

== See also ==
- X25-M, a solid-state drive
