= Rostyle wheel =

Design of automobile wheels

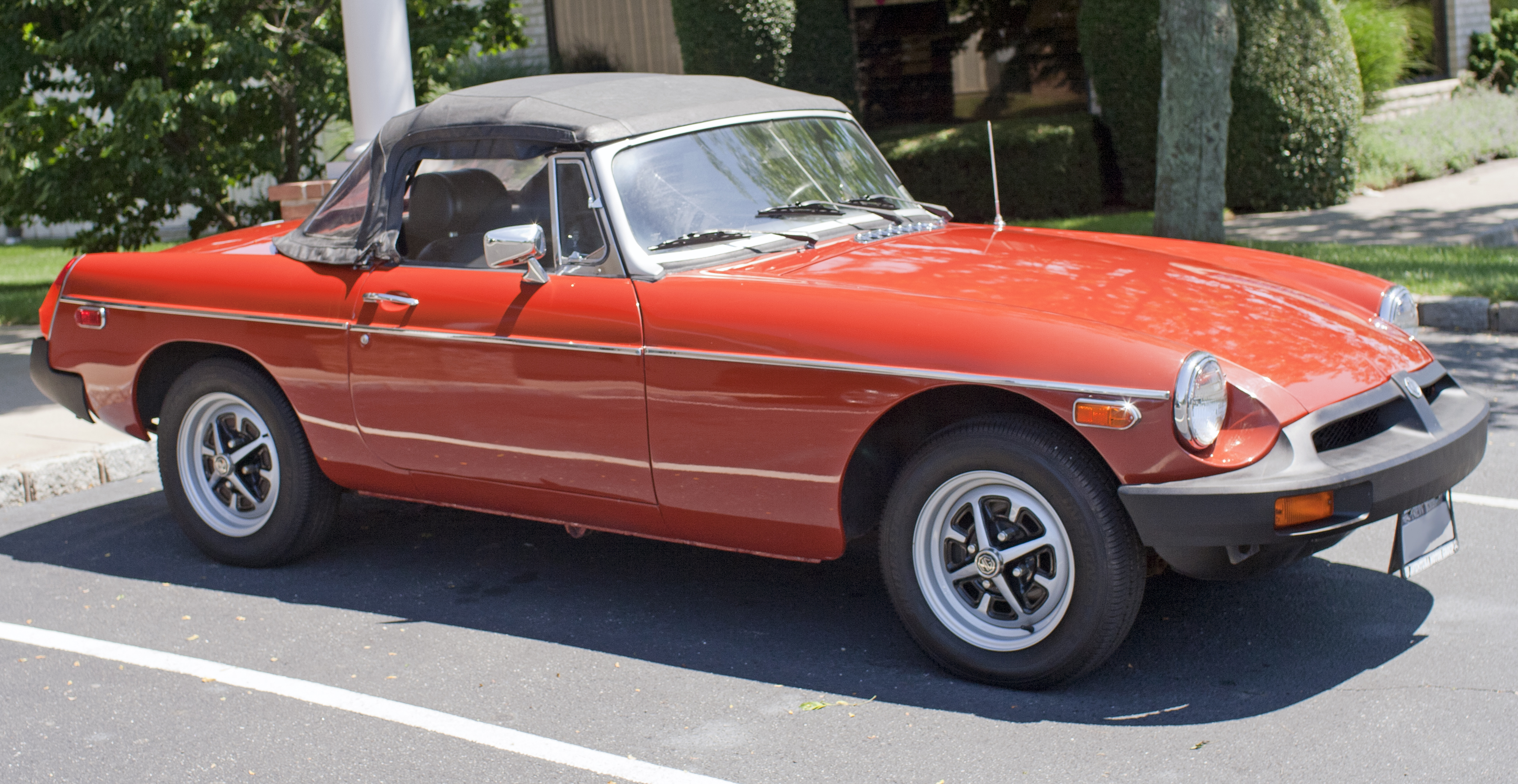
1975 MGB fitted with standard Rostyle wheels

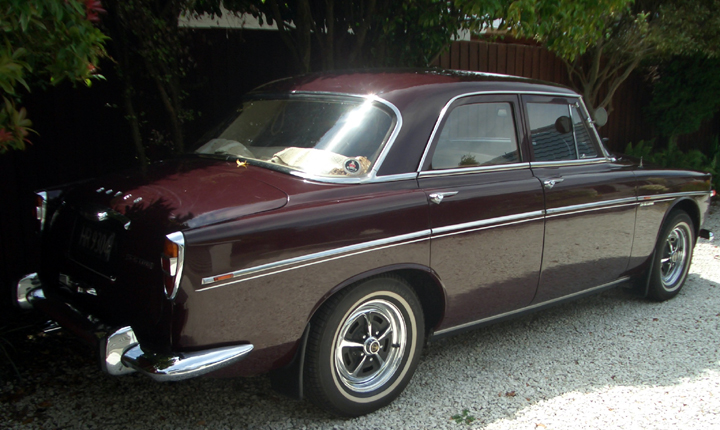
1970 Rover P5B with chromed Rostyle wheels

Rostyle wheels are a design of automobile wheels of American origin but made under licence by the British firm of Rubery Owen – hence RO-Style – The Rostyle wheel was especially popular during the 1960s and 1970s.

The wheels had a characteristic pressed steel form with raised 'spokes', and were painted aluminium-grey on the spokes and rim and black between the spokes to imitate the open space of true magnesium alloy wheels. They were designed for use without the need of hubcaps or wheel covers, but usually had a centre cap carrying the emblem of the car manufacturer.

In the United States, the wheel style was manufactured in Lansing, Michigan, by the Motor Wheel Corporation, and found fame in the 1960s and 1970s on Muscle cars like the Pontiac GTO, Ford Torino, Shelby Mustang, Plymouth Barracuda and AMC Javelin. In an American context, the wheel style was known as the "Magnum 500". Hence, the first British cars with "Rostyle" wheels were referred to in early road tests as having "Magnum style" wheels.

The first appearance of Rostyle wheels on the Rover P5B met with descriptions of them by some testers as "raffish" and "gaudy", and ill-befitting a luxury saloon. At that time, some Rover road testers also referred to the wheels as "Ro-style", suggesting that the name, if not the style, may have first been developed specifically for wheels fitted to Rovers. Although this surfaces as "fact" on forums, it is not correct. The name "Rostyle" is a portmanteau word deriving from "R-ubery O-wen" (the manufacturer of the wheels) and "Style": "ROstyle": "Rostyle".

The firms MG and Rover, amongst other British sporty car manufacturers in the 1960s, often specified Rostyle wheels as original equipment instead of ones made of light alloy or wire spoked wheels. Chromium-plated Rostyle wheels were made for Jensen, Rover and, famously, the Ford Cortina 1600E, originally designed for Ford Chairman Len Crossland's wife.

Rostyle wheels were the only wheel option on the Range Rover for many years following its introduction. These 16-inch Rostyles were used on the Range Rover until 1986, when they were replaced by alloy wheels. The Rostyles then became optional fitment to the short wheelbase Land Rover (the wheels were not strong enough for use on the long wheelbase models). The Land Rover maintained its optional Rostyle wheels until 1995, becoming the last vehicle to offer them from new.

As well as in Britain, similar wheels were made under license in Germany, Argentina and Australia.

Special masks must be made to paint the wheels of restored cars to resemble the originals.

Max Sinclair, the sales manager for Rubery Owen in the 1960 to 1980 period, has stated that "We changed the face of motoring, and Mag wheels followed us as their reliability improved."
