= East Shore =

East Shore may refer to the following places, all in the United States:

- East Shore, California, an unincorporated community in Plumas County
- East Shore (New Haven), a neighborhood of the city of New Haven, Connecticut
- East Shore, Staten Island, a region in the New York City borough of Staten Island

== See also ==
- Eastern Shore (disambiguation)
