= Rover 3500 =

Two different automobiles from Rover have been called the 3500 both of which are classified as Executive Cars (E):

- Rover P6, 1968–1977
- Rover SD1, 1976–1986

== See also ==
- Rover 3.5-Litre, 1958–1973
