= Rover P5 =

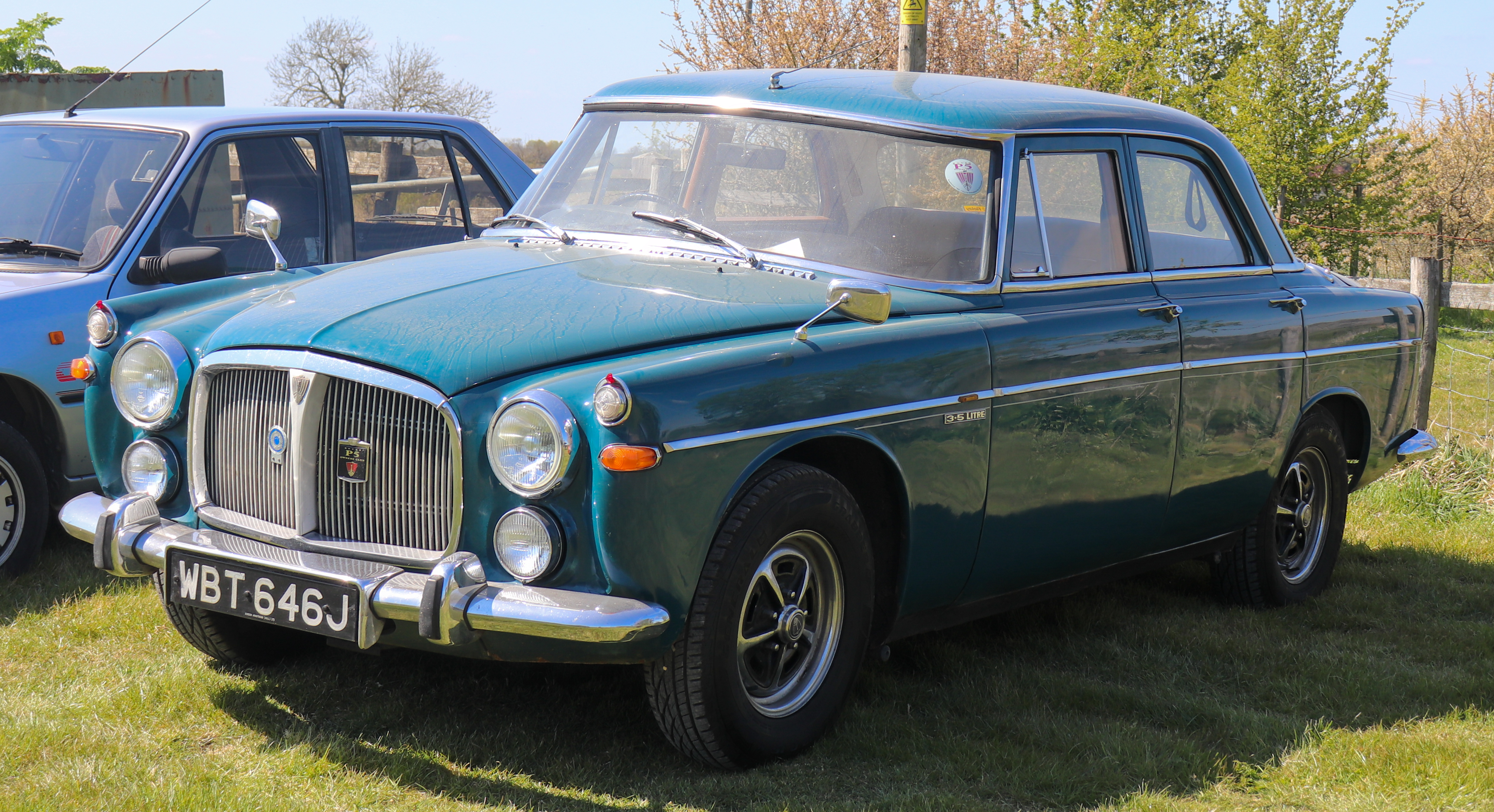
- Rover 3.5 Litre Saloon

Overview
- Manufacturer: The Rover Co. Ltd (1958–1967); Leyland Motors (1967–1968); British Leyland (1968–1973)
- Production: 1958–1973
- Assembly: United Kingdom: Solihull
- Designer: David Bache

Body and chassis
- Class: Executive car
- Layout: FR layout

Dimensions
- Wheelbase: 110.5 in (2,807 mm)
- Length: 186.5 in (4,737 mm)
- Width: 70 in (1,778 mm)
- Height: 61 in (1,549 mm) Saloon; 58 in (1,473 mm) Coupé
- Kerb weight: 3,498 lb (1,587 kg) (3.5 litre saloon)

Chronology
- Predecessor: Rover P4 (concurrent)
- Successor: Rover P6 (concurrent)

The Rover P5 is a series of large saloon and coupé cars that were produced by Rover from 1958 until 1973. The models were marketed under the names Rover 3 Litre, Rover 3.5 Litre and Rover 3½ Litre.

The P5 was a larger car than the P4 which in some respects it replaced. A total of 69,141 examples were built.

A major step ahead for Rover came with the P5 model of 1958, a large luxury saloon with a 3-litre version of Rover's six-cylinder Inlet Over Exhaust (IOE) engine carried forward from the Rover P4 series.

It was the first Rover car with unitary bodywork, styled by David Bache. This model combined elegance with dignity, and had a traditionally well-appointed interior. Later developments of the P5 included the more rakish coupe with a lowered roof line, and the 3.5 litre V8 model of 1967 which for the first time used an all-aluminium V8 engine design purchased from the Buick Motor Division of General Motors Corporation in the United States. The 3- and 3.5-litre models became favourites for transport of dignitaries, including British Prime Ministers from Harold Wilson to Margaret Thatcher. The Queen also used several Rover P5 cars for her private motoring.

== Mark I ==
Mark I "3-Litre"
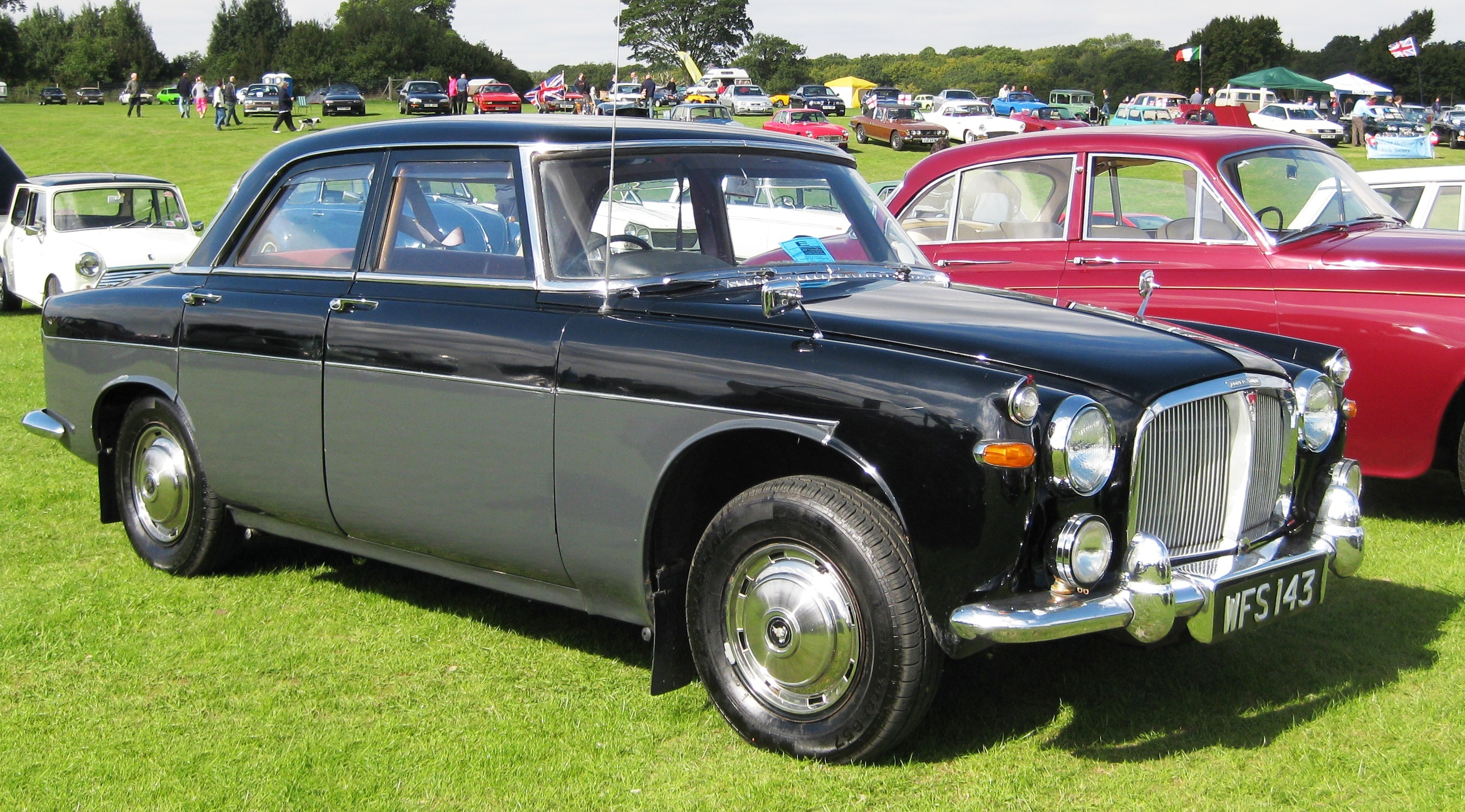

Overview
- Production: 1958–1962

Body and chassis
- Body style: 4-door saloon

Powertrain
- Engine: 3.0L I6

The P5 appeared in September 1958, badged as the "3-litre". It was powered by a 2,995-cubic-centimetre (182.8 cu in) engine. This straight-6 IOE engine used an overhead intake valve and side exhaust valve, an unusual arrangement inherited from the Rover P4. In this form, output of 115 brake horsepower (86 kW) was claimed. An automatic transmission, overdrive on the manual, and Burman power steering were optional, with overdrive becoming standard from May 1960.

Stopping power came originally from a Girling brake system that employed 11-inch (280 mm) drums all round, but this was a heavy car and by the time of the London Motor Show in October 1959 Girling front power disc brakes were fitted.

The suspension was independent at the front using wishbones and torsion bars and at the rear had a live axle with semi-elliptic leaf springs.

A Mark I-A line, introduced in September 1961, featured a minor restyle with added front quarter windows, intended to "assist the dashboard ventilation". Under the metal, the 1A featured modifications to the engine mountings and the automatic transmission and hydrosteer variable ratio power steering as an option.

By 1962, when production of the original Mark I series ended, 20,963 had been produced.

An automatic version tested by The Motor magazine in 1960 had a top speed of 95.0 miles per hour (152.9 km/h) and could accelerate from 0–60 miles per hour (0–97 km/h) in 17.1 seconds. A fuel consumption of 20.5 miles per imperial gallon (13.8 L/100 km; 17.1 mpg_{‑US}) was recorded. The test car cost £1,864 including taxes.

== Mark II ==
Mark II "3-Litre"
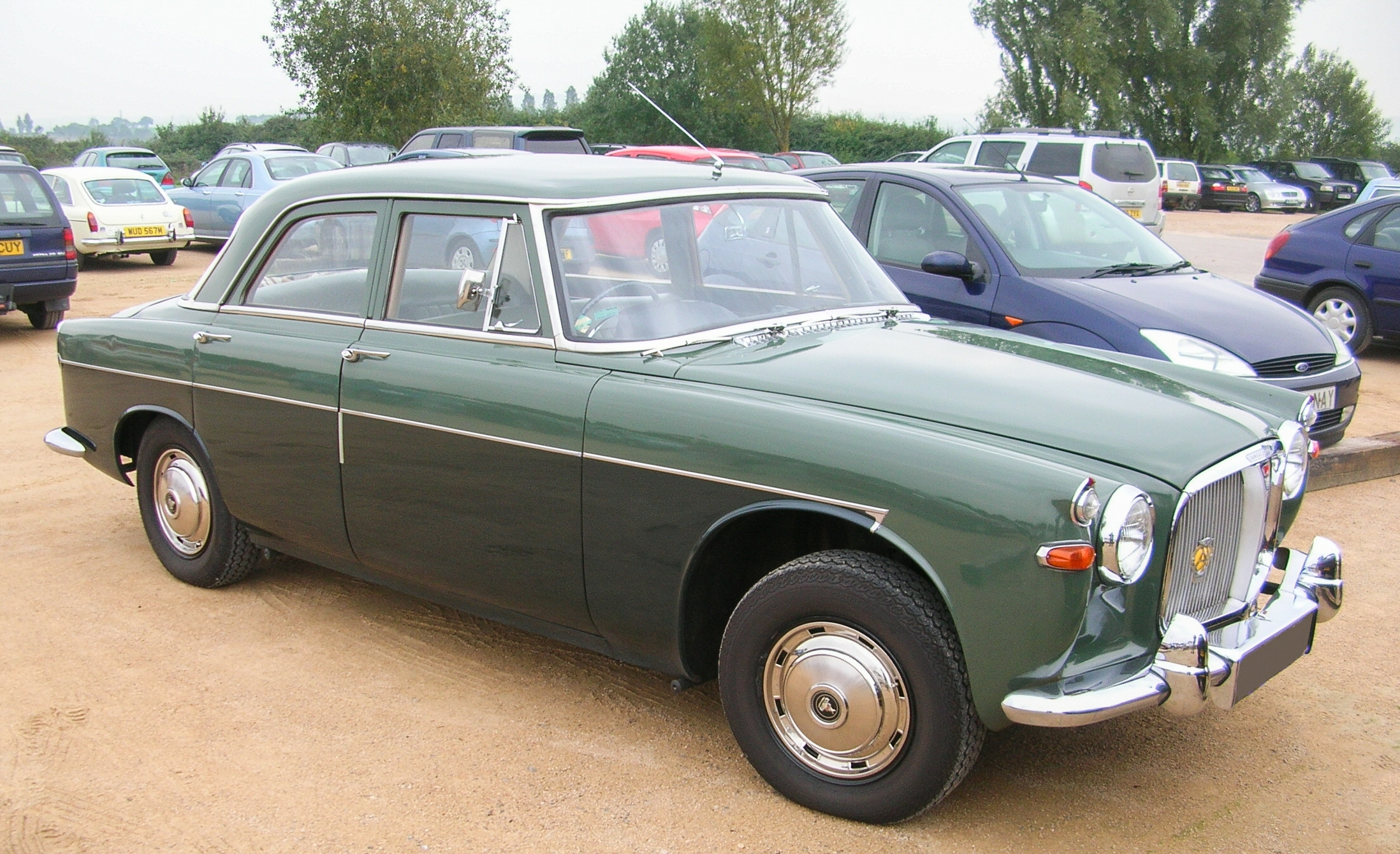

Overview
- Production: 1962–1965

Body and chassis
- Body style: 4-door saloon 4-door coupé

Powertrain
- Engine: 3.0L I6

The Mark II version of the P5 was introduced in 1962. It featured more power, 129 horsepower (96 kW), from the same 3-litre engine and an improved suspension, while dropping the glass wind deflectors from the top of the window openings which also, on the front doors, now featured "quarterlight" windows.

The most notable addition to the range was the option of the Coupé body style launched in autumn 1962. Unlike most coupés, which tend to be two-door versions of four-door saloons, this retained the four doors and was of the same width and length as the saloon, but featured a roofline lowered by two and a half inches (6.4 cm) along with thinner b-pillars, giving it the look of a hardtop. Hydrosteer power-assisted steering was standard on the coupé and optional on the saloon.

Production of the Mark II ended in 1965, by which time 5,482 coupés and 15,676 saloons had been produced.

== Mark III ==
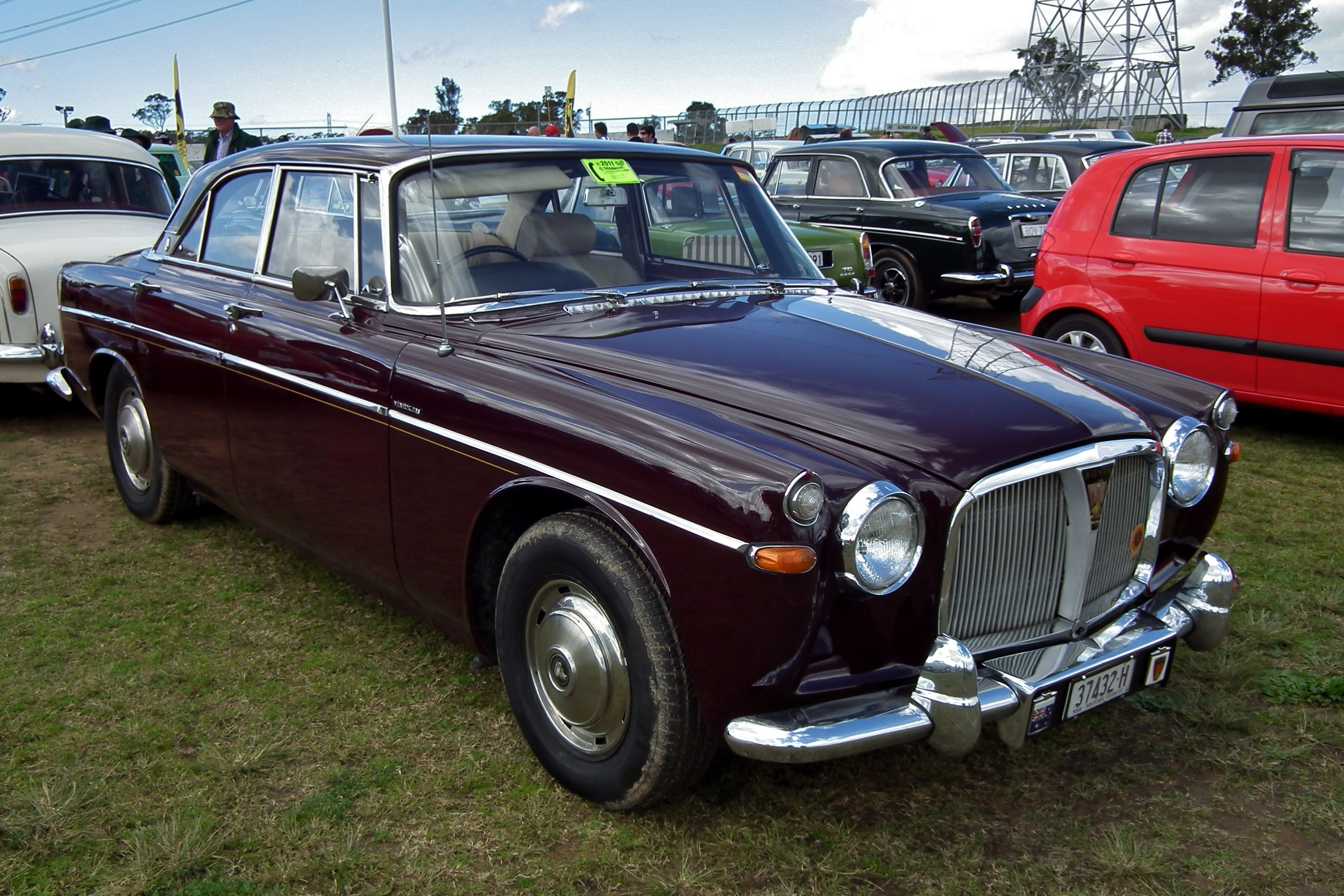
Rover 3 Litre Coupé (P5 Mark III)

Mark III "3-Litre"
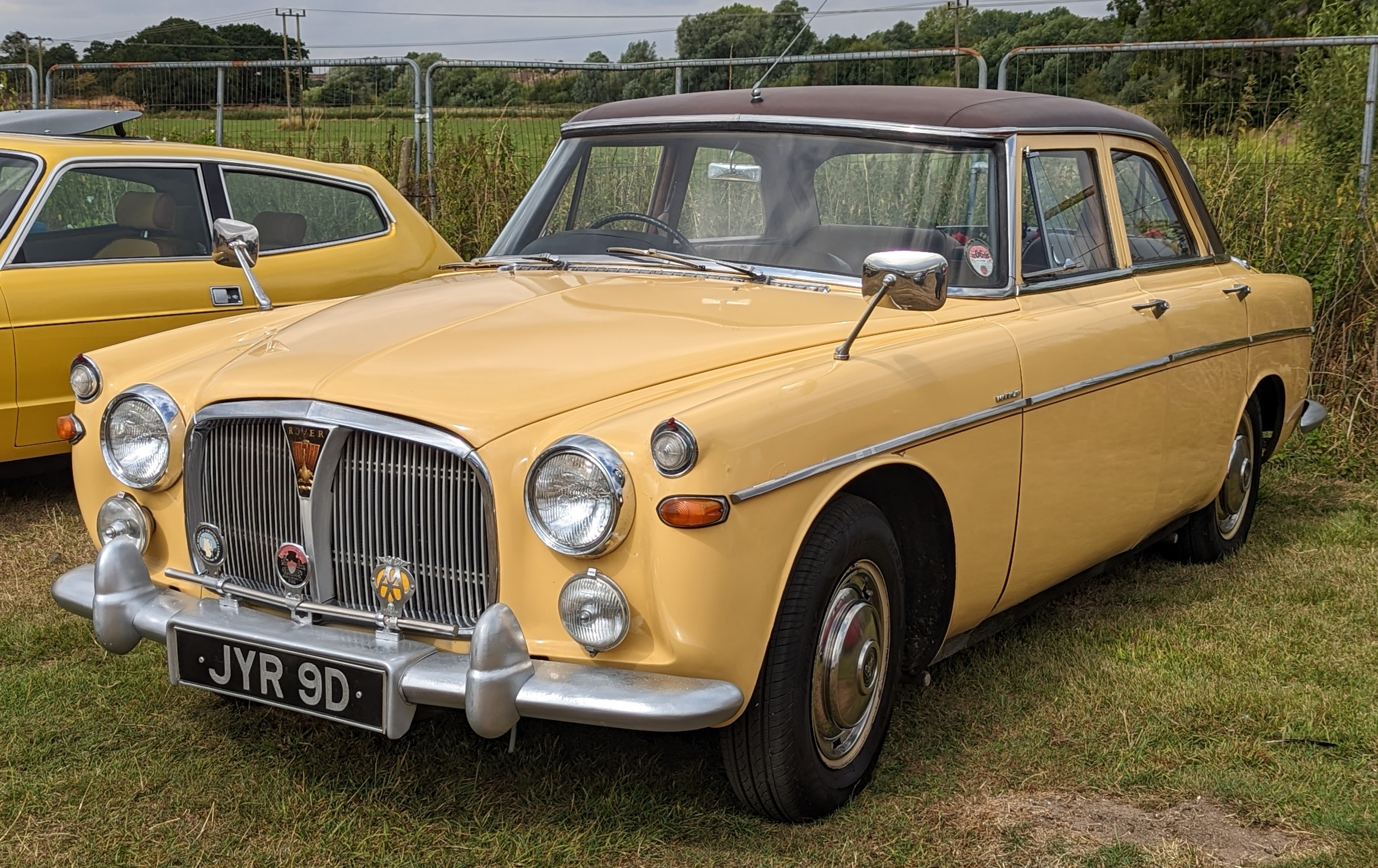

Overview
- Production: 1965–1967

Body and chassis
- Body style: 4-door saloon 4-door coupé

Powertrain
- Engine: 3.0L I6

The Mark III was presented at the London Motor Show in October 1965, described at the time as "even more luxuriously trimmed and furnished". It was again available in two 4-door body styles, coupé and saloon. The Mark III used the same engine as its predecessor, but it now produced 134 horsepower (100 kW). Externally it could be distinguished by the full-length trim strip along the body and Mark III badging; internally, it replaced the rear bench seat with two individually moulded rear seats, making it more comfortable to ride in for four occupants but less so for five.

A total of 3,919 saloons and 2,501 coupés had been sold by the time production ended in 1967.

== P5B ==
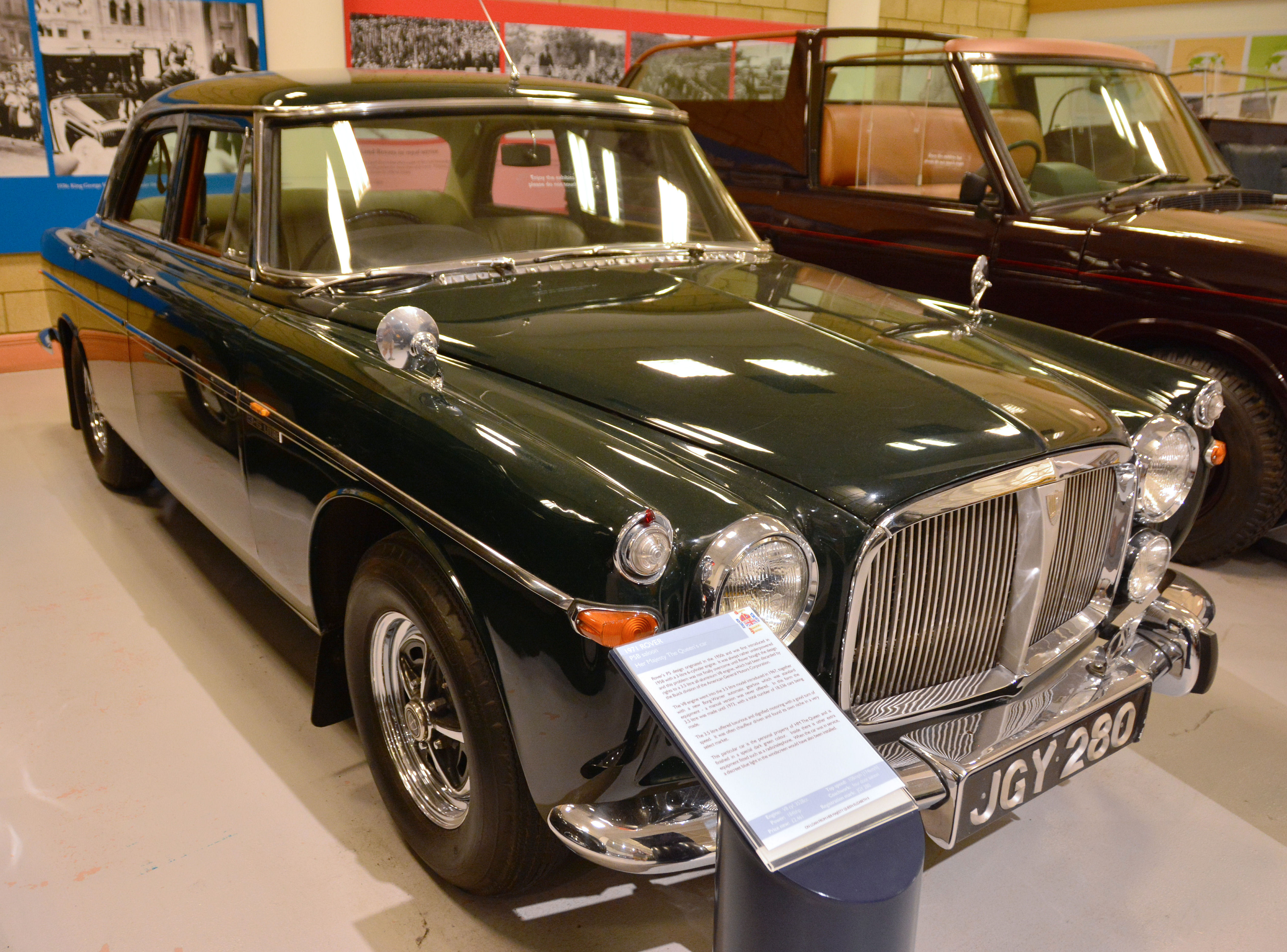
1971 Rover P5B owned by Queen Elizabeth II

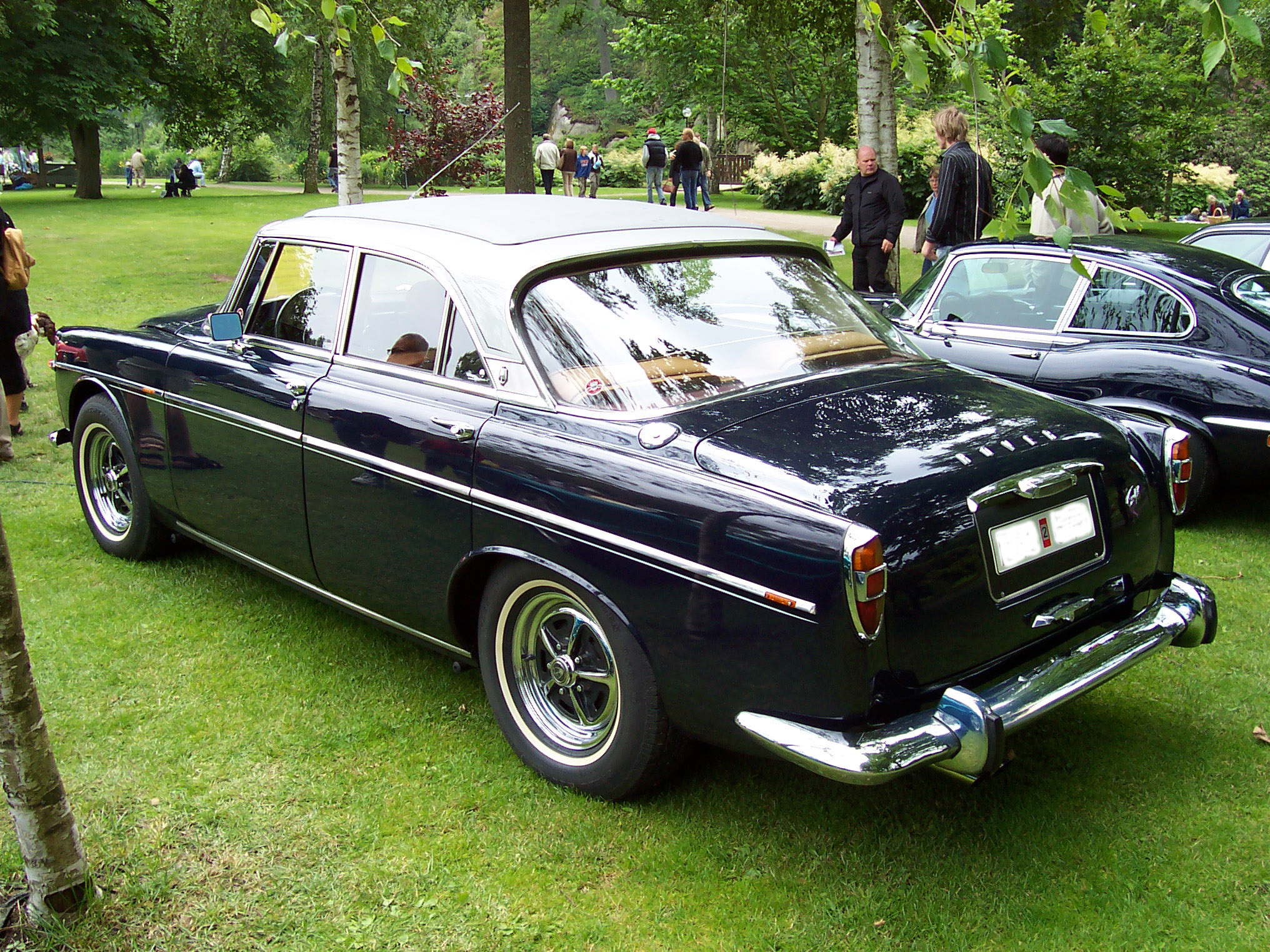
The coupé version featured a lowered roof line; shown is a P5B coupé.

P5B "3.5-Litre"
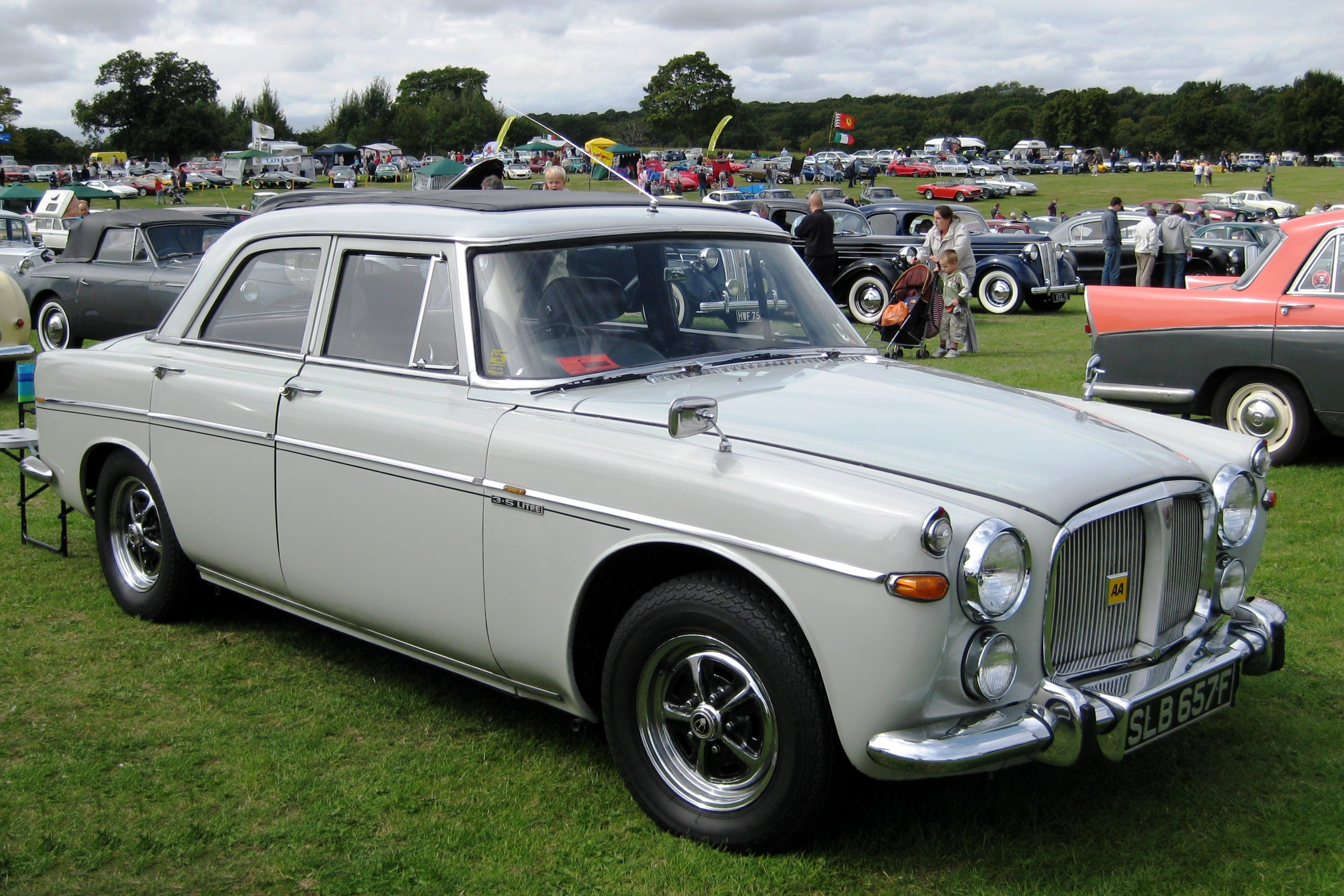

Overview
- Also called: Rover 3½ Litre
- Production: 1967–1973

Body and chassis
- Body style: 4-door saloon 4-door coupé

Powertrain
- Engine: 3.5L Rover V8

The final iteration of the P5 appeared in September 1967. Now powered by the 3,528 cc (215 cu in) Rover V8 engine also used in the 3500, the car was badged as the "3.5 Litre", and commonly known as the 3½ Litre. The final letter in the "P5B" model name came from Buick, the engine's originator. Rover did not have the budget to develop a new engine; hence, they chose to develop the lightweight aluminium Buick engine, making it considerably stronger. While this added some weight, it still maintained the engine's light and compact features. The Borg Warner Type-35 automatic transmission, hydrosteer variable ratio power steering and front Lucas fog lights were now standard.

Output of 160 metric horsepower (120 kW) was claimed along with improved torque. When introduced in 1967, the Buick-designed V8 produced 160 PS (118 kW; 158 hp) at 5,200 rpm and 210 lb⋅ft (280 N⋅m) of torque at 2,600 rpm. The greater power of the engine, along with its lower weight, provided improved performance as well as fuel economy.

The exterior was mostly unchanged, apart from bold "3.5 Litre" badging, a pair of fog lights which were added below the headlights, creating a striking four-light array, and the fitting of chrome Rostyle wheels with black painted inserts. The P5B existed as both the 4-door coupé and saloon body style until end of production. Production ended in 1973, by when 9,099 coupés and 11,501 saloons had been built.

The 3½ Litre saloon variant was a favourite of high-ranking government ministers, and served as Prime Ministerial transport for Harold Wilson, Edward Heath, James Callaghan, and Margaret Thatcher. As testament to their suitability, the last batch of P5Bs to roll off the Rover line in June 1973 was purchased by the British government and placed in storage, to be released for government use as required. For that reason, registered relatively new-looking P5s were therefore still familiar sights in Westminster for more than a decade after production had ended.

When Margaret Thatcher entered Downing Street in 1979 after her election victory, she was driven in a 1972 model. It was during Thatcher's eleven-year tenure that the P5 was eventually phased out as a Prime-Ministerial car, in favour of the Jaguar XJ.

Queen Elizabeth II also owned an Arden Green Rover P5B Saloon "JGY 280", which is on display at the Heritage Motor Centre, Gaydon, Warwickshire and was seen in the 18 May 2003 episode of BBC motoring show Top Gear.

Rover 3.5 Litre – saloon vs. coupé

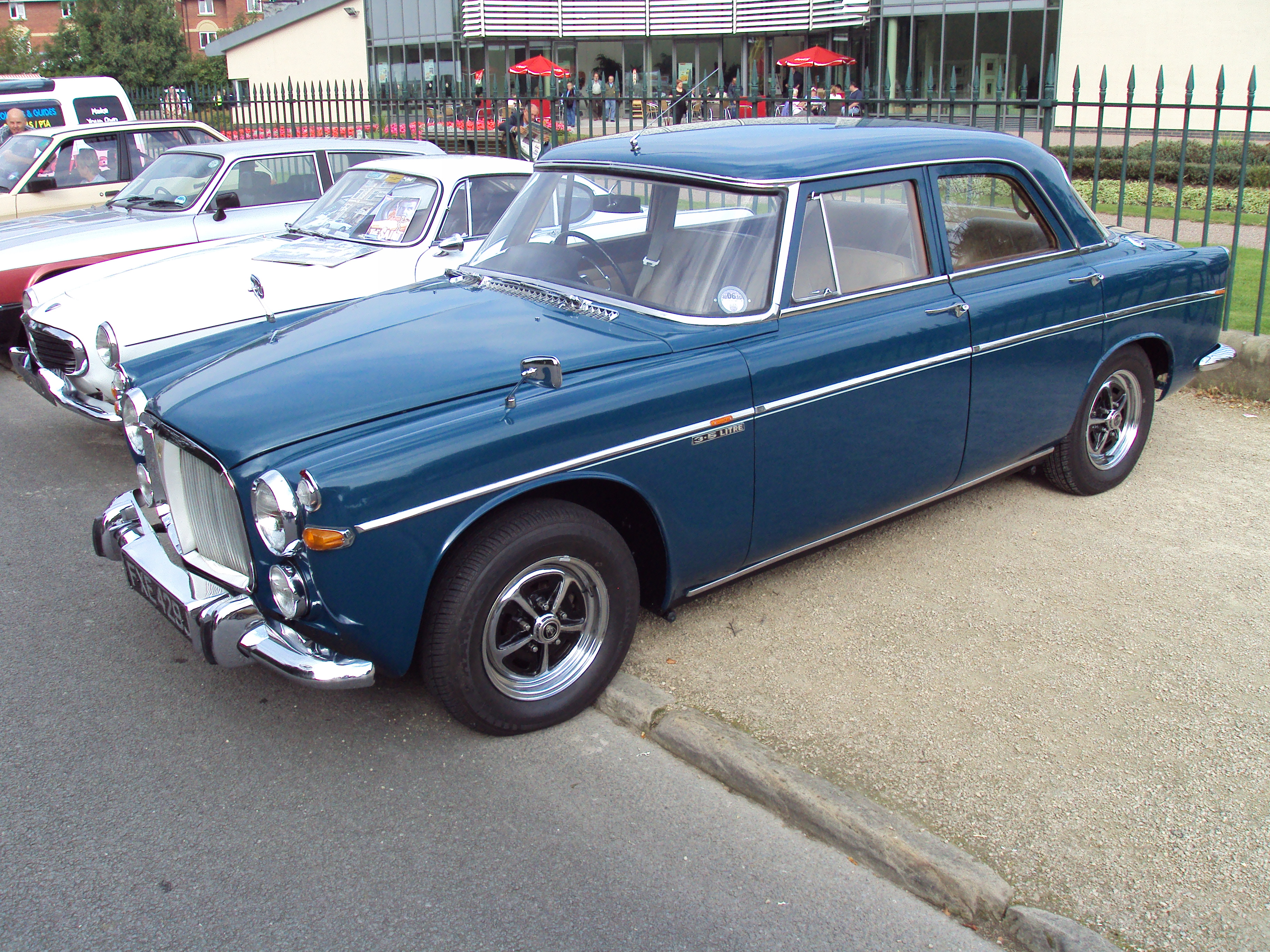
Saloon

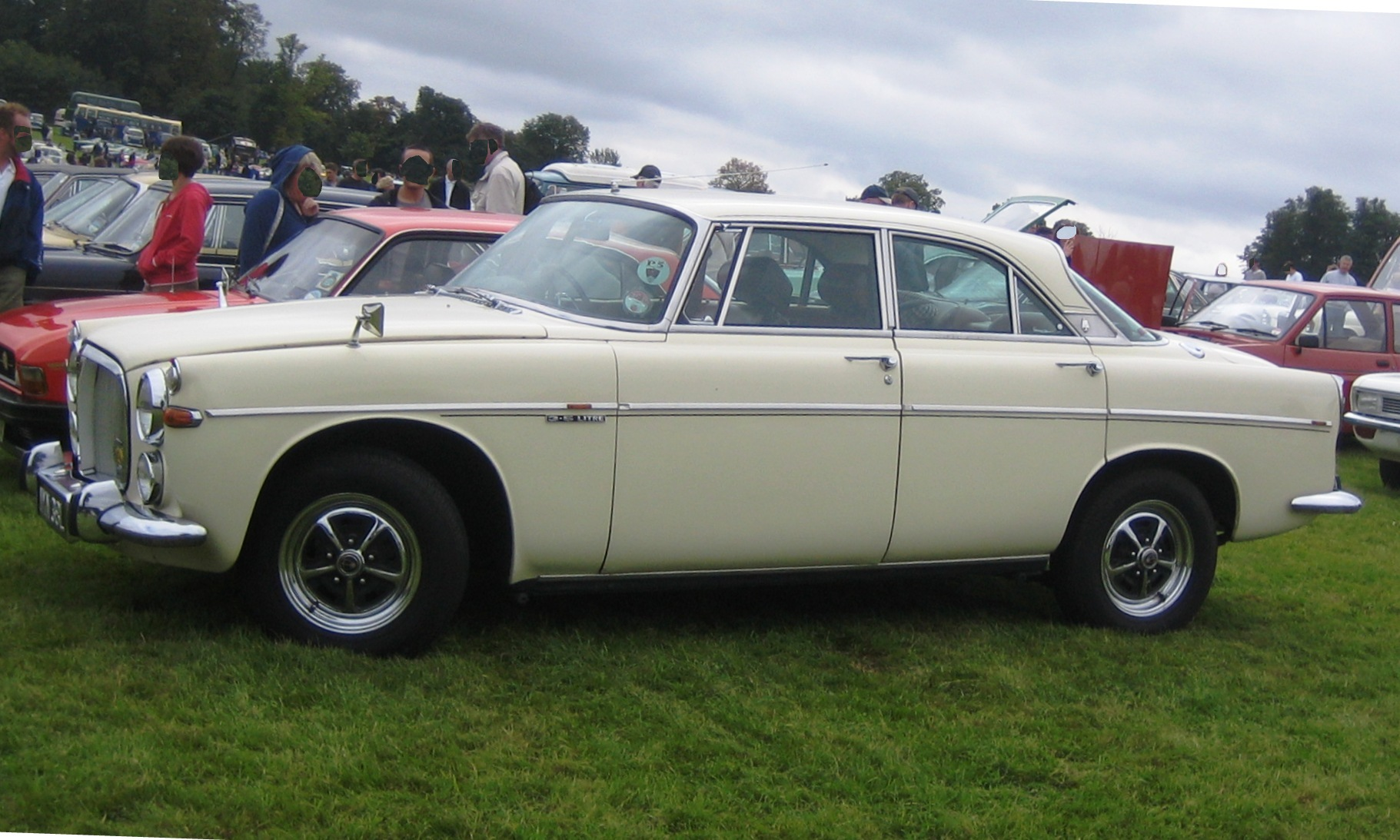
Coupé

Note differences in roofline, windows, and B- and C- pillars

== Motorsport ==
The Rover P5 is sturdy enough to be a popular choice for banger racing.

A Rover P5 3-litre was the seventh of the "Magnificent Seven" finishers in the 1963 Safari Rally. One humorous theory is that the car was so heavy that it sank through the mud until it found bedrock.

== Royal P5 and P5Bs ==
In some respects it is difficult to establish exactly how many Rover P5s Queen Elizabeth II had because she had arranged to carry forward her personal number plates JGY 280 on most of her private cars, with the exception of her last P5B which was JGY 280K.

In February 1961 the Queen took delivery of her first Rover P5 3 litre Mk 1 which was registered JGY 280 and finished in dark green. In May 1961 the Queen Mother took delivery of a similar 3 litre car registered VUL 4. Neither car was obviously different from standard specification, although VUL 4 did carry a discreet identifying lamp at the base of its roof-mounted radio aerial and was illuminated when in use by a member of the Royal family. This was to allow the police on point duty to quickly identify and usher the Royal Rover through the traffic.

In 1963 the Queen took delivery of the first of two 3 Litre Mk 2 cars, the first carrying forward the personal number plate JGY 280 with the second Mk 2 being built rather later, finished in Pine Green, and registered 155 HYU. This was an additional car, not a replacement, and delivered to the Royal Estate at Sandringham and is still housed in the Royal Mews and is on display for visitors to see, among other Royal vehicles.

It is clear that the Queen had considered the Rover P5 her favourite car during the 1960s and when the 3-litre models were no longer available, she took delivery of her first P5B replacement. Rover records suggest that just two P5Bs were delivered for her personal use and both were saloons, although other P5Bs were undoubtedly used by the Royal Household more generally.

The first of these two cars was VIN 84007057D, which was finished in a special dark green (Recorded as T&N Dark Green) which she specifically requested and it was delivered towards the end of January 1971 with the registration number JGY 280.

The Queen's second car was also in the T&N Dark Green and was VIN 84100723D – the last P5B manufactured in 1973 but not delivered to the Queen until March 1974, as it had a number of modifications as a consequence of the Irish Troubles. The Queen appears to have wanted to retain her private registration JGY 280 which had been on all of her earlier Rovers, but the car was given the contemporary number of JGY 280K – presumably because that was less conspicuous for a car which she used to drive unaccompanied on public roads. As of 1997, both cars were still owned by the Queen and retained at the Gaydon Motor Heritage Museum.
