= NS 3500 (ex-SBB) =

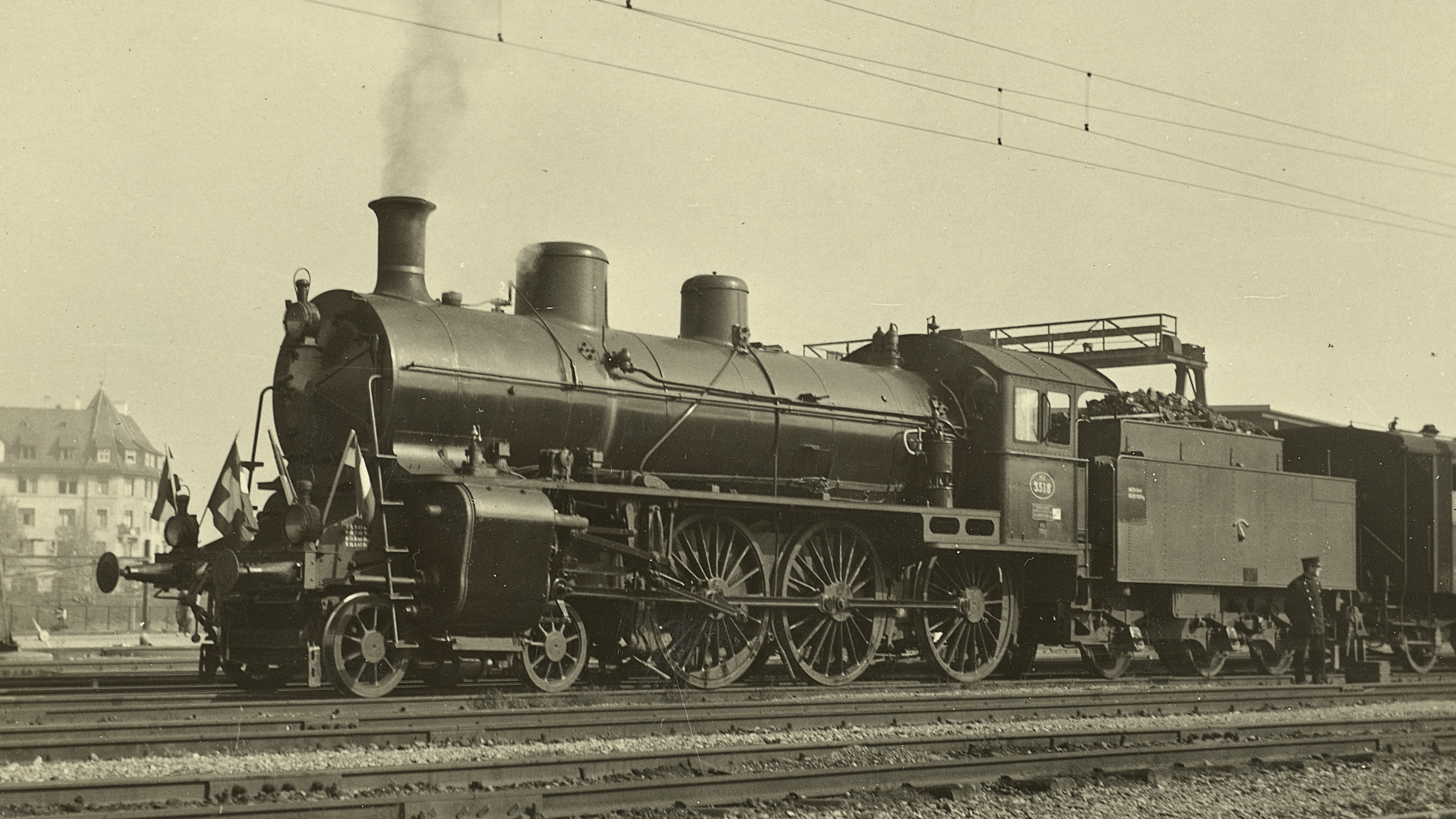
- NS 3518, ex SBB A 3/5 642
Type and origin
- Power type: Steam
- Builder: Schweizerische Lokomotiv- und Maschinenfabrik (SLM)
- Build date: 1946
- Total produced: 22
Specifications
- Configuration
  - Whyte: 4-6-0
  - UIC: 2'C
- Gauge: 1,435 mm (4 ft 8 1/2 in)
- Driver dia.: 1,780 mm (5 ft 10 in)
- Length: 18,740 mm (61 ft 6 in)
- Height: 4,485 mm (14 ft 8.6 in)
- Loco weight: 73 t (80 short tons; 72 long tons)
- Tender weight: 41.4 t (45.6 short tons; 40.7 long tons)
- Fuel type: Coal
- Fuel capacity: 7 t (7.7 short tons; 6.9 long tons)
- Water cap.: 18 m^{3} (4,000 imp gal)
- Firebox
  - Grate area: 15.3 m^{2} (165 sq ft)
- Boiler pressure: 14 kg/cm^{2} (200 psi)
- Heating surface
  - Firebox: 2.8 m^{2} (30 sq ft)
  - Tubes: 135.7 m^{2} (1,461 sq ft)
- Superheater
  - Heating area: 42.4 m^{2} (456 sq ft)
- Cylinders: 4 (2 high pressure, 2 low pressure)
- Cylinder size: high pressure: 425 mm × 660 mm (16.7 in × 26.0 in), low pressure: 630 mm × 660 mm (25 in × 26 in)
- Valve gear: Walschaerts
Performance figures
- Tractive effort: 14,390 kgf (31,700 lbf)
Career
- Operators: NS
- Numbers: 3501 - 3522
- Nicknames: Goudvinken (bullfinches)
- Withdrawn: 1948 - 1952
- Preserved: None, All scrapped

The NS 3500 was a series of steam locomotives of the Dutch Railways (NS), which were acquired second-hand from the Swiss railways SBB.

After the Second World War, the NS urgently needed locomotives, as many locomotives had been destroyed or taken due to the war conditions. Among other things, 22 2'C (4-6-0) steam locomotives of the class A 3/5 603–649, which were withdrawn there, were taken over from the Swiss SBB.

The locomotives would actually be put into service as NS series 3651–3672, but because the last three locomotives of the NS 3500 series had been withdrawn shortly before, these locomotives were given the numbers 3501–3522. Between May and October 1946 they were taken in five locomotive convoys via France and Belgium to the Central Workshop of the NS in Tilburg. There were some adjustments made before they were put into service from June 1946 in unaltered black livery. The locomotives were allocated to Zwolle, Nijmegen, The Hague, Venlo and Zutphen depot. At the NS, they were nicknamed 'Goudvinken' (bullfinches) because of the narrow brass band around the chimney. But some locomotives were painted in NS green. After only a few years of service, the locomotives were withdrawn between 1948 and 1952.

== History ==
Between 1907 and 1915, the Swiss Lokomotiv- und Maschinenfabrik (SLM) delivered 47 locomotives to the Swiss Federal Railways (SBB). The locomotives were designated A 3/5, and were given the numbers 603–649. The SBB withdrew the locomotives from service between 1934 and 1946.

Lot No.	Entered SBB service	SBB number	NS number	Entered NS service	Withdrawn	Notes
2114	1910	605	3501	1946	1949	
2115	1910	606	3502	1946	1952	
2116	1910	607	3503	1946	1949	
2118	1910	609	3504	1946	1948	
2122	1910	613	3505	1946	1951	
2123	1910	614	3506	1946	1950	
2124	1910	615	3507	1946	1949	
2248	1912	621	3508	1946	1949	
2250	1912	623	3509	1946	1949	
2251	1912	624	3510	1946	1948	
2253	1912	626	3511	1946	1948	
2334	1913	628	3512	1946	1948	
2335	1913	629	3513	1946	1948	
2438	1914	634	3514	1946	1948	
2439	1914	635	3515	1946	1948	
2442	1914	638	3516	1946	1949	
2443	1914	639	3517	1946	1948	
2446	1914	642	3518	1946	1951	
2447	1914	643	3519	1946	1949	
2539	1915	647	3520	1946	1951	
2540	1915	648	3521	1946	1948	
2541	1915	649	3522	1946	1949	

== Gallery ==
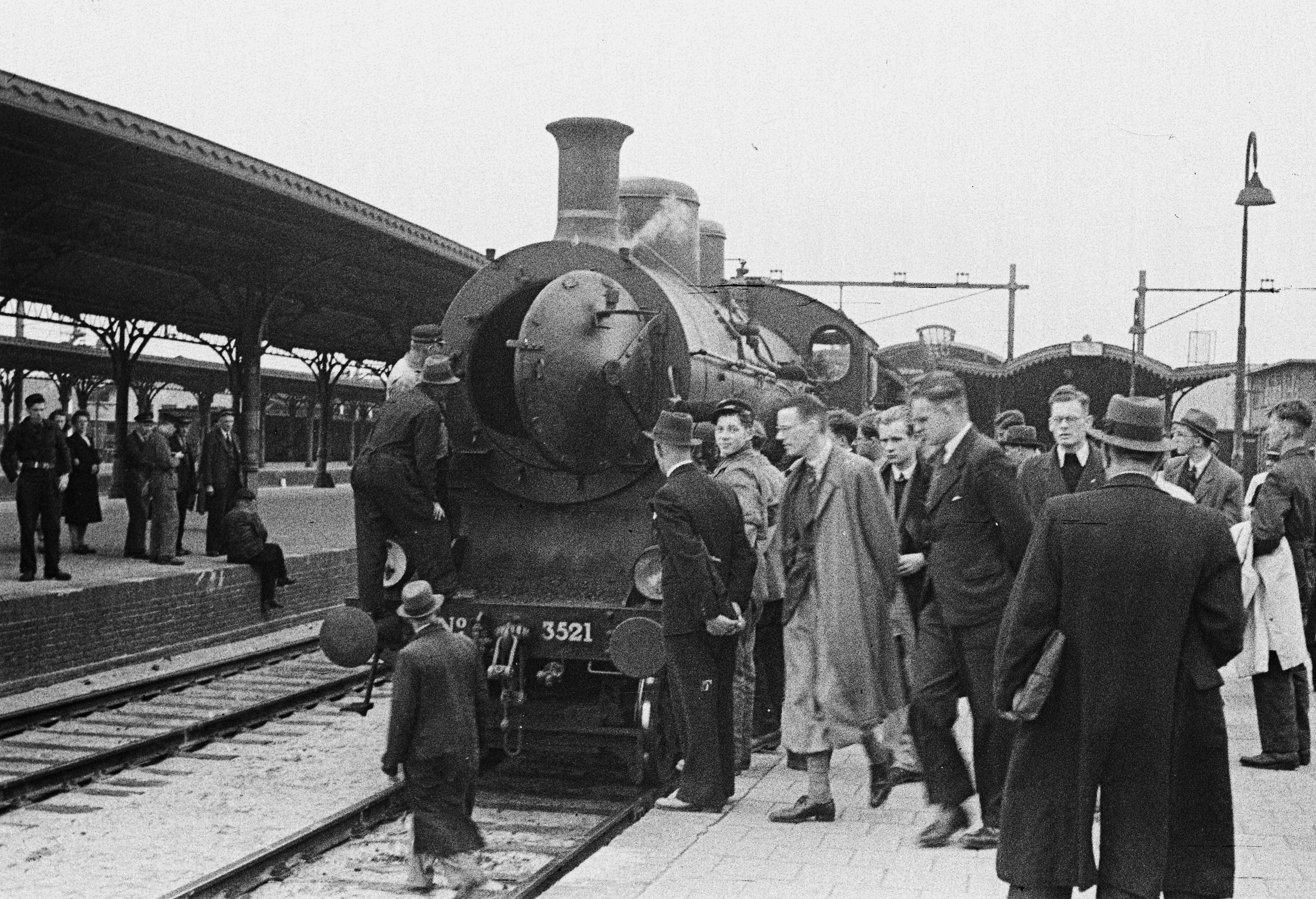
NS 3521 (ex-SBB)

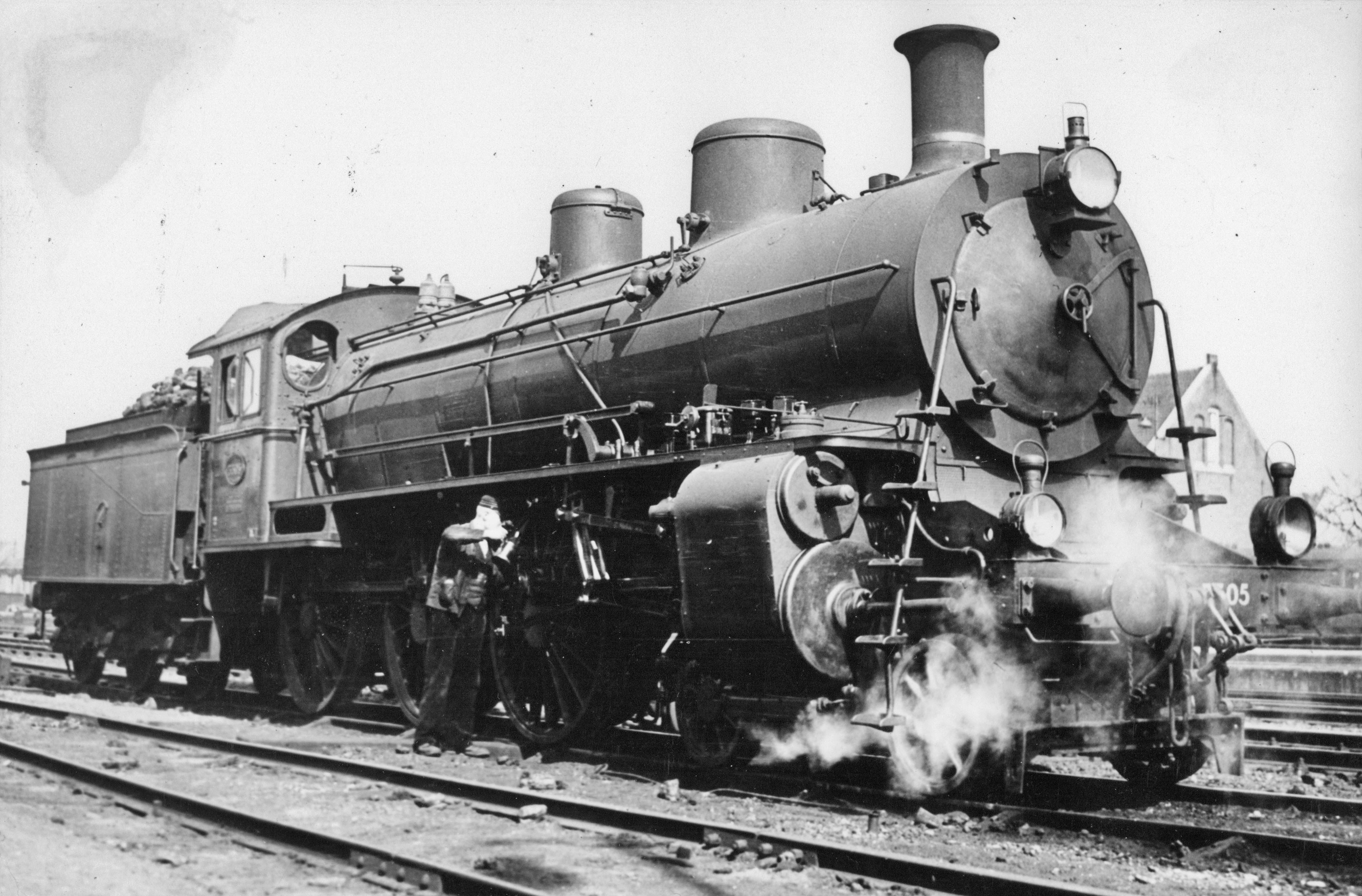
NS 3505 (ex-SBB) at the yard of Zwolle. (Between 1946 and 1952)

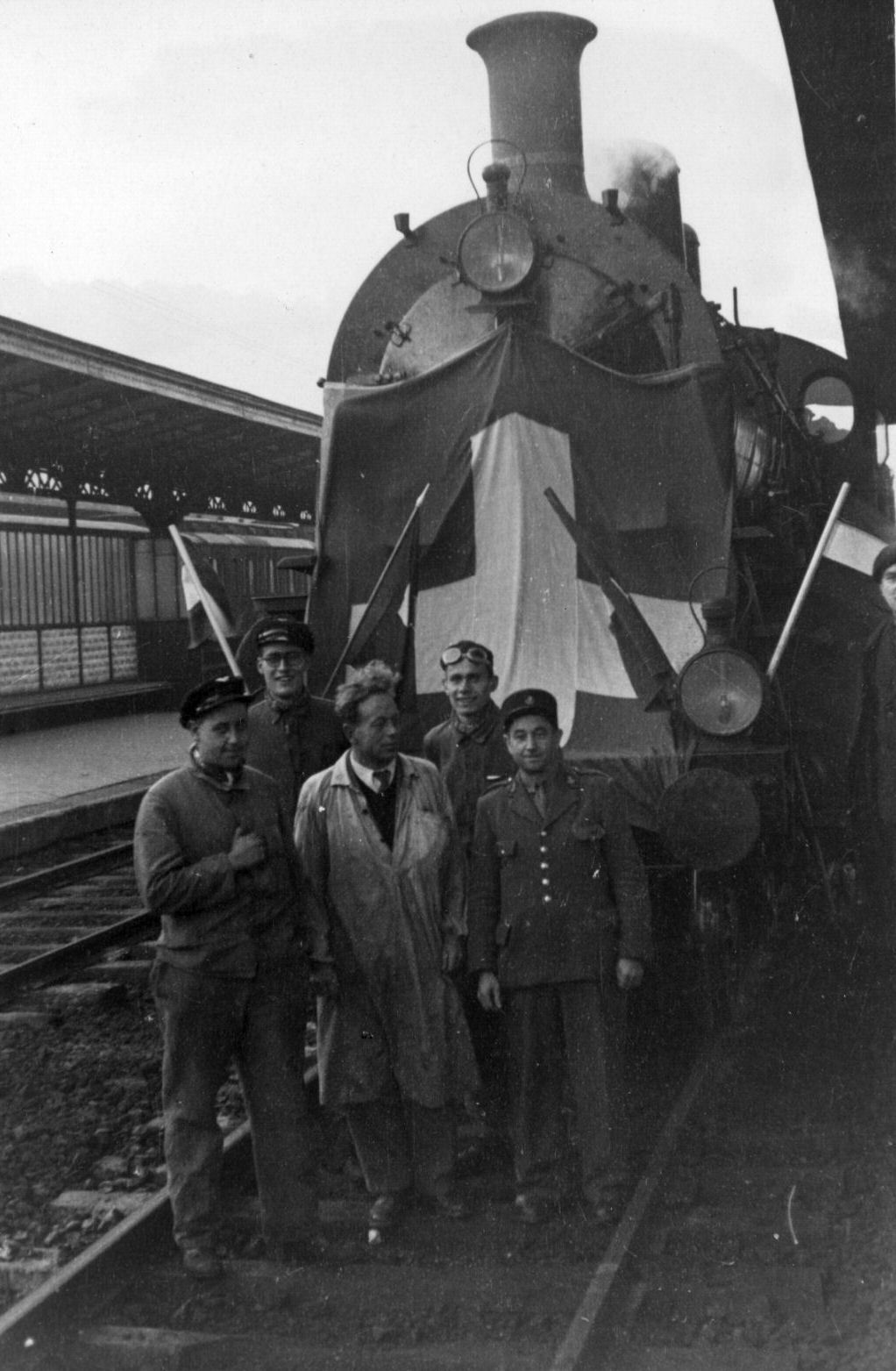
NS 3518 (ex-SBB) in Longwy (France). (18-10-1946)

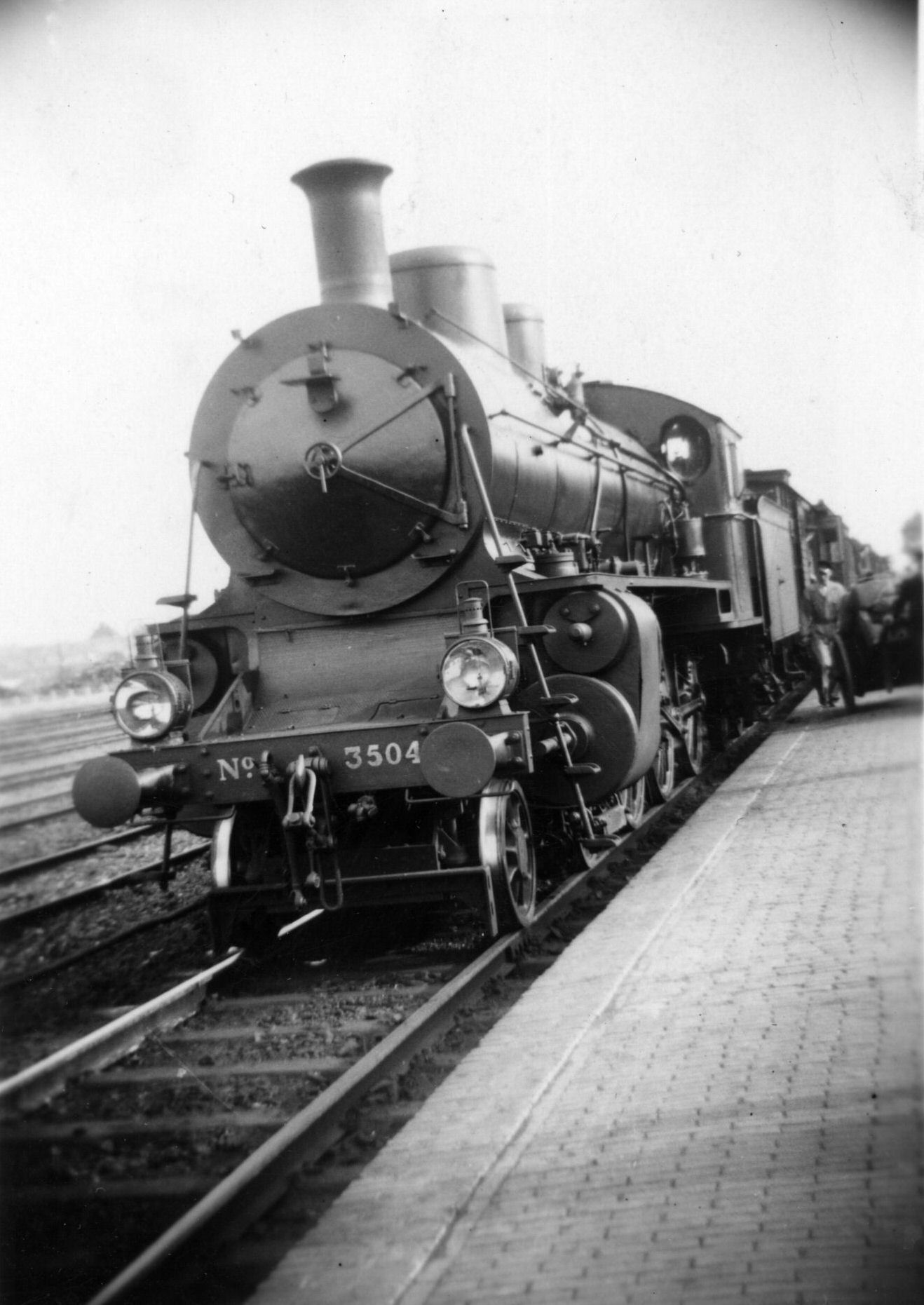
NS 3504 (ex-SBB) in Roermond. (03-07-1947)

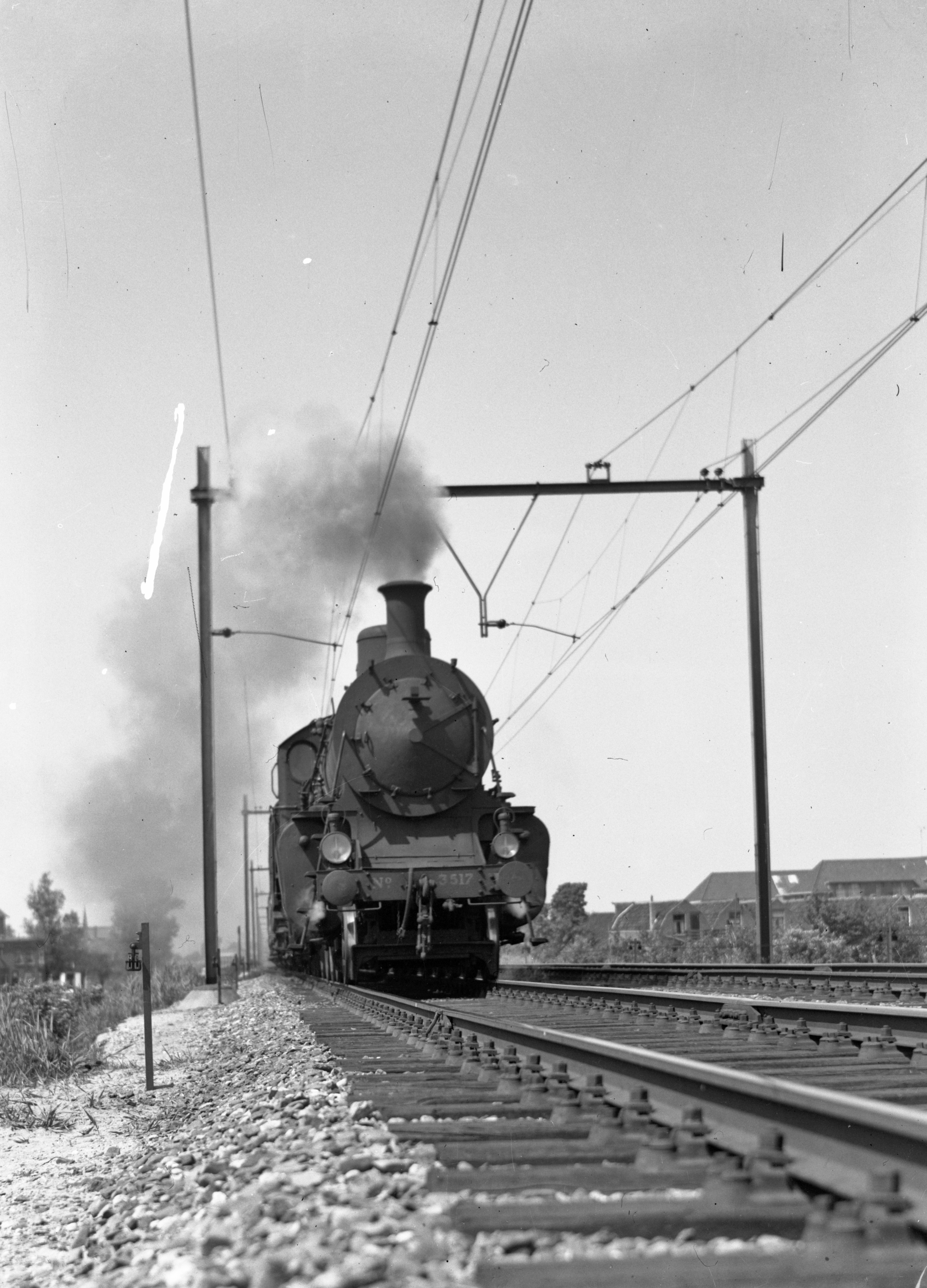
NS 3517 (ex-SBB)

== Sources and references ==
- H. Waldorp: Onze Nederlandse stoomlocomotieven in woord en beeld, (7e druk) uitgeverij De Alk, Alkmaar, 1986. ISBN 90-6013-947-X.
- R.C. Statius Muller, A.J. Veenendaal jr., H. Waldorp: De Nederlandse stoomlocomotieven. Uitg. De Alk, Alkmaar, 2005. ISBN 90-6013-262-9.
- A. Weijts: Tussen vuur en stoom. Uitg. Europese Bibliotheek, Zaltbommel, 2001. ISBN 90-288-2694-7.
- N.J. van Wijck Jurriaanse: Stoomlocomotieven van de Nederlandse Spoorwegen. UItg. Wyt, Rotterdam, 1972. ISBN 90-6007-517-X
