= GM 3500 engine =

GM 3500 engine may refer to:

- GM High Value engine, Chevrolet 60° V6 3.5 engine
- DOHC LX5, Oldsmobile V6
- Vortec 3500, straight-5
