= List of Intel SSDs =

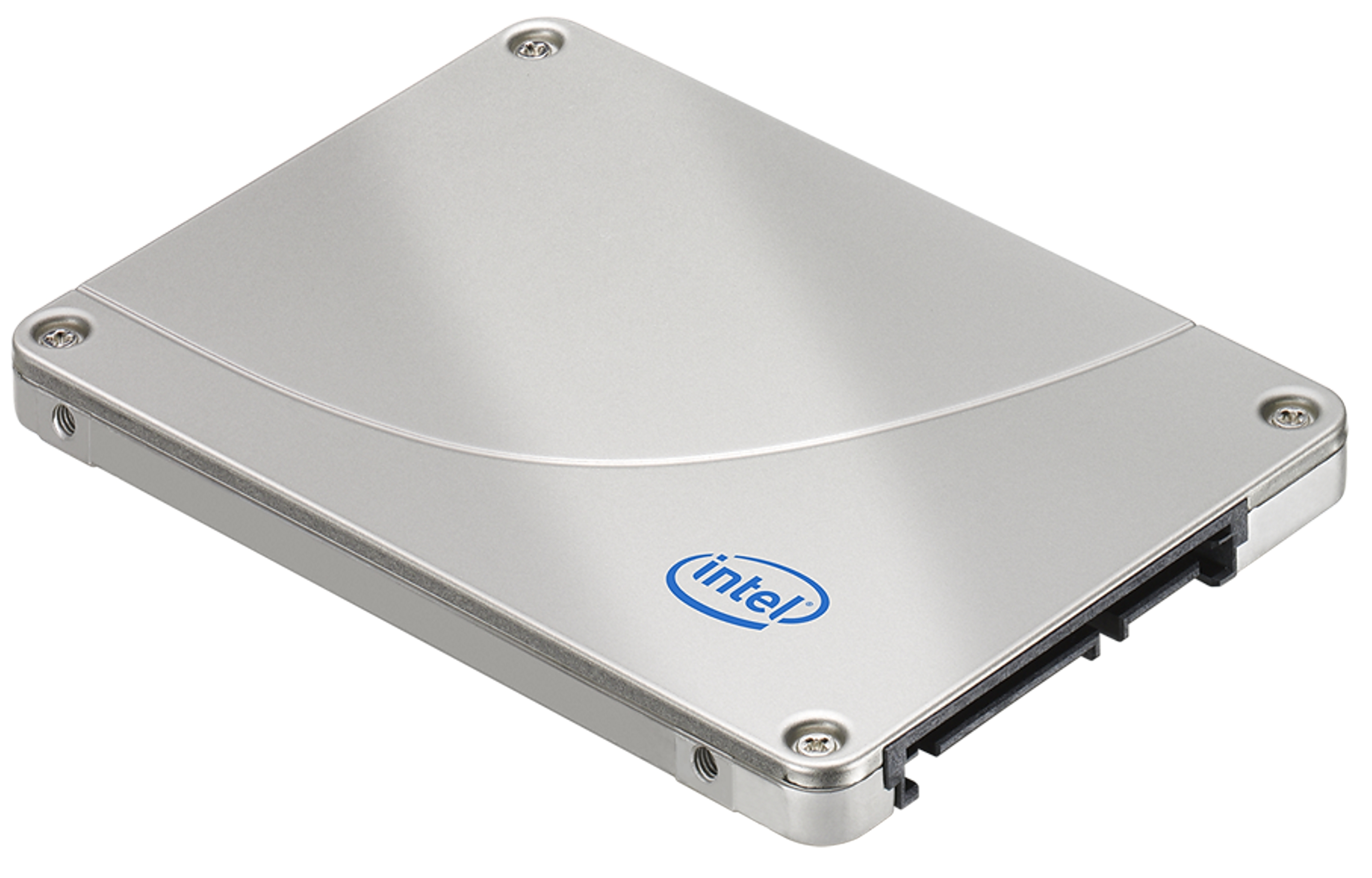
An Intel X25-M SSD

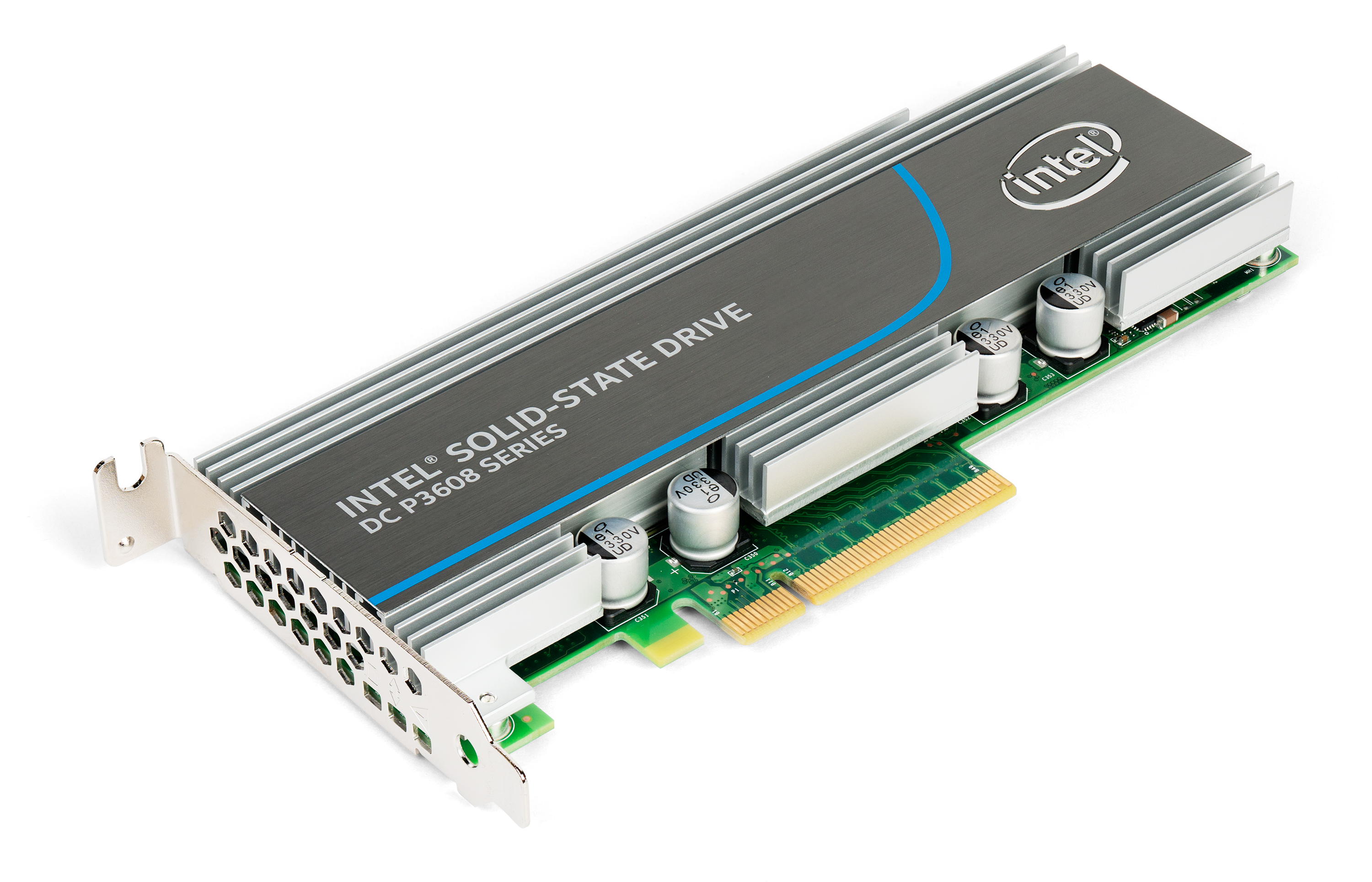
Intel P3608 NVMe flash SSD, PCI-E add-in card

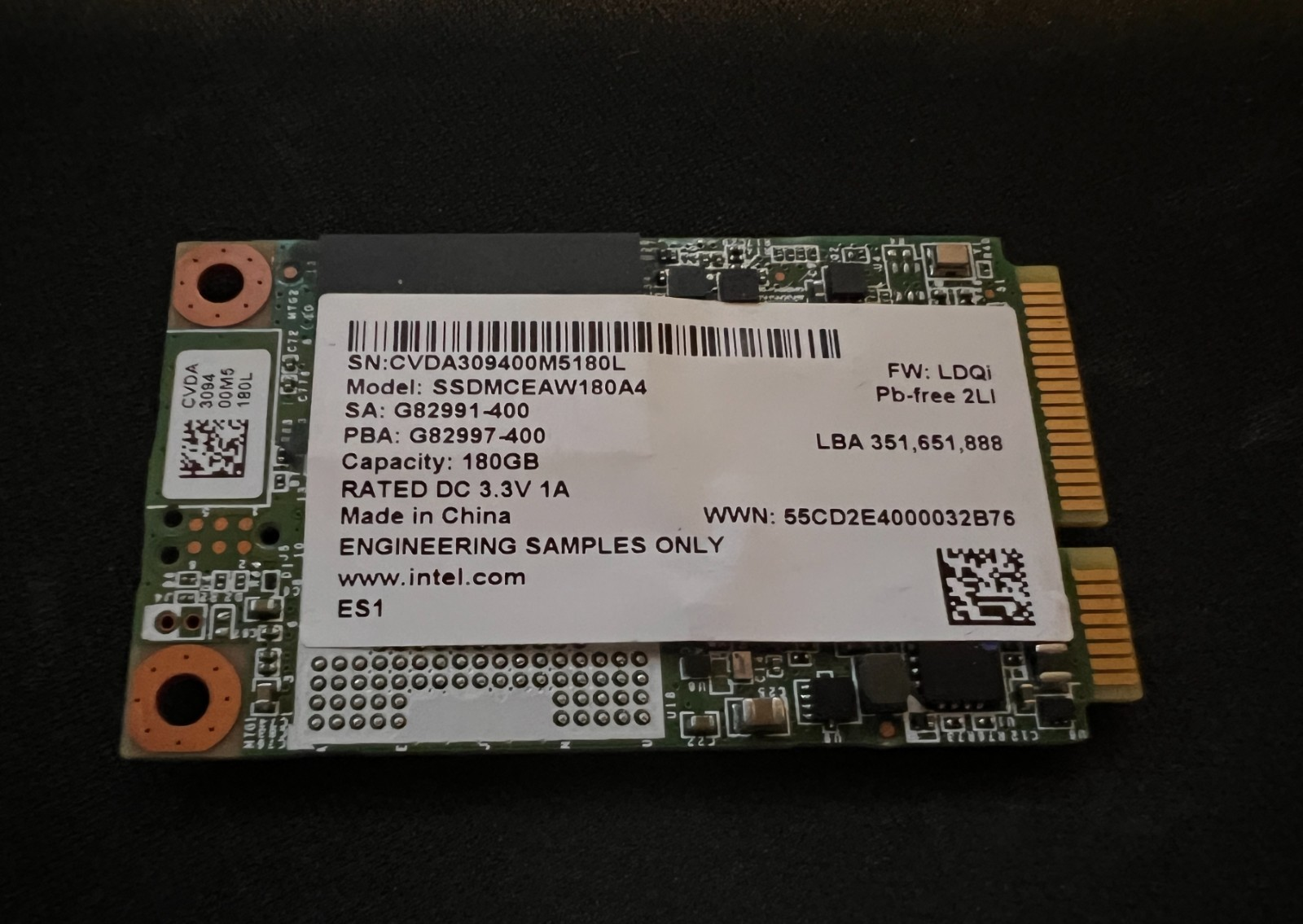
An Intel mSATA SSD

On September 8, 2008, Intel began shipping its first mainstream solid-state drives (SSDs), the X18-M and X25-M with 80 GB and 160 GB storage capacities. Reviews measured high performance with these MLC-based drives. Intel released its SLC-based Enterprise X25-E Extreme SSDs on October 15 that same year in capacities of 32 GB and 64 GB.

In July 2009, Intel moved its X25-M and X18-M lines from a 50-nanometer to a 34-nanometer process. These new drives, dubbed by the press as the X25-M and X18-M G2 (or generation 2), reduced prices by up to 60 percent while offering lower latency and improved performance.

On February 1, 2010, Intel and Micron announced that they were gearing up for production of NAND flash memory using a new 25-nanometer process. In March of that same year, Intel entered the budget SSD segment with its X25-V drives with an initial capacity of 40 GB. The SSD 310, Intel's first mSATA drive was released in December 2010, providing X25-M G2 performance in a much smaller package.

March 2011 saw the introduction of two new SSD lines from Intel. The first, the SSD 510, used an SATA 6 Gigabit per second interface to reach speeds of up to 500 MB/s. The drive, which uses a controller from Marvell Technology Group, was released using 34 nm NAND Flash and came in capacities of 120 GB and 250 GB. The second product announcement, the SSD 320, is the successor to Intel's earlier X25-M. It uses the new 25 nm process that Intel and Micron announced in 2010, and was released in capacities of 40, 80, 120, 160, 300 and 600 GB. Sequential read performance maxes out at 270 MB/s due to the older SATA 3 Gbit/s interface, and sequential write performance varies greatly based on the size of the drive with sequential write performance of the 40 GB model peaking at 45 MB/s and the 600 GB at 220 MB/s.

Micron and Intel announced that they were producing their first 20 nm MLC NAND flash on April 14, 2011.

In February 2012, Intel launched the SSD 520 series solid state drives using the SandForce SF-2200 controller with sequential read and write speeds of 550 and 520 MB/s respectively with random read and write IOPS as high as 80,000. These drives will replace the 510 series. Intel has released the budget 330 series solid state drive in 60, 120, and 180 GB capacities using 25 nm flash memory and a SandForce controller that have replaced the 320 series.

In late 2015, Intel announced that they were producing their first consumer PCIe-based solid state drive, to be named the 750 series. These new drives would either be plugged directly into a compatible PCIe 3.0 x4 slot or into the U.2 connector on the motherboard.

In 2017, Intel launched the 900P series Optane SSDs based on 3D XPoint technology as opposed to NAND flash memory. The price and speed of Optane memory is between that of DRAM and NAND. Prices are 2x-5x that of SSDs at announcement with significantly reduced latency.

== List ==
Intel SSDs
Model	Codename	Capacities (GB)	Memory type	Interface	Form factor	Controller	Seq. read/write MB/s	Rnd 4 KB read/write IOPS (K)	Introduced	Comment / Source
X18-M/X25-M	Ephraim	80/160	50 nm MLC	SATA 3 Gbit/s	1.8"/2.5"	Intel	250/70	35/3.300–0.35	Sept 2008 (now EOL)	
X25-E	Ephraim	32/64	50 nm SLC	SATA 3 Gbit/s	2.5"	Intel	250/170	35/3.3	Oct 2008	
X18-M G2 / X25-M G2	Postville	80/120/160	34 nm MLC	SATA 3 Gbit/s	1.8"/2.5"	Intel	250/100	35/6.6–0.3	July 2009	
X25-V	Glenbrook	40	34 nm MLC	SATA 3 Gbit/s	2.5"	Intel	170/35	25/2.5–?	Mar 2010	
310	Soda Creek	40/80	34 nm MLC	SATA 3 Gbit/s	mSATA	Intel	200/70	35/2.6	Dec 2010	
510	Elmcrest	120/250	34 nm MLC	SATA 6 Gbit/s	2.5"	Marvell	500/315	20/8	Mar 2011	
320	Postville Refresh	40/80/120/160/300/600	25 nm MLC	SATA 3 Gbit/s	1.8"/2.5"	Intel PC29AS21BA0	270/220	39.5/23	Mar 2011	Originally to be released Oct 2010, named X18-M G3 & X25-M G3, the 1.8" was released later in 2011
311	Larsen Creek	20	34 nm SLC	SATA 3 Gbit/s	2.5"/mSATA	Intel	200/105	37/3.3	May 2011	Special low capacity SLC SSD for use with Intel SRT
710	Lyndonville	100/200/300	25 nm MLC-HET	SATA 3 Gbit/s	2.5"	Intel PC29AS21BA0	270/210	38.5/2.7	Sept 2011	
520	Cherryville	60/120/180/240/480	25 nm MLC	SATA 6 Gbit/s	2.5"	SandForce	550/520	50/80	February 2012	Replaces 510
313	Hawley Creek	20/24	25 nm SLC	SATA 3 Gbit/s	2.5"/mSATA	Intel	220/115	36/4	April 2012	Replaces 311; for use with SRT
330	Maple Crest	60/120/180/240	25 nm MLC	SATA 6 Gbit/s	2.5"	SandForce	500/450	22.5/33	April 2012	
910	Ramsdale	400/800	25 nm MLC-HET	PCIe 2.0 × 8	PCIe	Intel/Hitachi EW29AA31AA1	2000/1000	180/75	April 2012	
335	Jay Crest	80/180/240	20 nm MLC	SATA 6 Gbit/s	2.5"	SandForce	500/450	42/52	October 2012	
DC S3700	Taylorsville	100/200/400/800	25 nm MLC-HET	SATA 6 Gbit/s	1.8"/2.5"	Intel PC29AS21CA0	500/450	72/34	November 2012	Endurance: 10 DWPD/1.83PB to 14.60PB
525	Lincoln Crest	30/60/120/180/240	25 nm MLC	SATA 6 Gbit/s	mSATA	SandForce	550/520	50/60	January 2013	
DC S3500	Wolfsville	80/120/160/240/300/400/480/600/800	20 nm MLC	SATA 6 Gbit/s	1.8"/2.5"	Intel PC29AS21CA0	475/450	75/11.5	June 2013	Endurance: 45 TB to 450 TB
530	Dale Crest	80/120/180/240/360/480	20 nm MLC	SATA 6 Gbit/s	M.2/mSATA/2.5"	Intel LSI BF29AS41BB0 (LSI SandForce SF-2281)	540/490	41/80	July 2013	
Pro 1500	Sierra Star	80/120/180/240/360/480	20 nm MLC	SATA 6 Gbit/s	M.2/2.5"	Intel LSI BF29AS41BB0 (LSI SandForce SF-2281)	540/490	41/80	September 2013	
730	Jackson Ridge	240/480	20 nm MLC	SATA 6 Gbit/s	2.5"	Intel PC29AS21CA0	550/470	89/74	March 2014	Endurance: 50 GB WPD/91 TB
DC P3500	Pleasantdale	250/500/1000/2000	20 nm MLC	PCIe 3.0 x4 NVMe 1.0	2.5" with U.2 connector/AIC with PCIe x4 connector	Intel CH29AE41AB0	2800/1700	450/40	June 2014	Custom Intel NVMe controller
DC P3600	Fultondale	400/800/1200/1600/2000	20 nm MLC	PCIe 3.0 x4 NVMe 1.0	2.5" with U.2 connector/AIC with PCIe x4 connector	Intel CH29AE41AB0	2600/1700	450/56	June 2014	Endurance: 3 DWPD/2.19PB to 10.95PB
DC P3700	Fultondale	200/400/800/1600/2000	20 nm MLC-HET	PCIe 3.0 x4 NVMe 1.0	2.5" with U.2 connector/AIC with PCIe x4 connector	Intel CH29AE41AB0	2800/1700	450/150	June 2014	Custom Intel NVMe controller
Pro 2500	Temple Star	80/180/240/360/480	20 nm MLC	SATA 6 Gbit/s	M.2/2.5"	Intel LSI BF29AS41BB0 (LSI SandForce SF-2281)	540/490	48/80	July 2014	
DC S3610	Haleyville	200/400/480/800/1200/1600	20 nm MLC-HET	SATA 6 Gbit/s	1.8"/2.5"	Intel PC29AS21CB0	540/520	84/28	January 2015	Endurance: 3 DWPD/0.5PB to 10.7PB
DC S3710	Haleyville	200/400/800/1200	20 nm MLC-HET	SATA 6 Gbit/s	2.5"	Intel PC29AS21CB0	550/520	85/45	January 2015	Endurance: 10 DWPD/3.6PB to 24.3PB
535	Temple Star	56/120/180/240/360/480	16 nm MLC	SATA 6 Gbit/s	M.2/2.5"	Intel LSI BF29AS41BB0 (LSI SandForce SF-2281)	540/490	48/80	April 2015	Endurance: 40 GB WPD/73 TB
750	Carmel Ridge	400/800/1200	20 nm MLC	PCIe 3.0 x4 NVMe 1.0	2.5" with U.2 connector/AIC with PCIe x4 connector	Intel CH29AE41AB0	2500/1200	460/290	April 2015	Endurance: 70 GB WPD/127 TB
DC S3510	Haleyville	80/120/240/480/800/1200/1600	16 nm MLC	SATA 6 Gbit/s	2.5"	Intel	500/460	68/20	May 2015	Endurance: 0.3 DWPD/45 TB to 880 TB
DC P3608	Fultondale	1600/3200/4000	20 nm MLC-HET	PCIe 3.0 x8 NVMe 1.0	AIC with PCIe x8 connector	2× Intel CH29AE41AB1 + PLX PEX8718 for PCIe bifurcation	5000/3000	850/150	September 2015	Endurance: 3 DWPD/8.76PB to 21.90PB
750p	Carmel Ridge	400/800/1200	20 nm 128Gbit MLC	PCIe 3.0 x4 NVMe	HHHL (CEM2.0)/2.5"	Intel CH29AE41AB0	2200/900	430/230	Q3 2015	Endurance: 70 GB Writes per Day for Five Years
540s	Loyd Star	120/180/240/360/480/1000	16 nm TLC	SATA 6 Gbit/s	M.2/2.5"	Silicon Motion SM2256	560/400-560/480	60/50-78/85	March 2016	Endurance: 20 GB WPD for 120 GB model
Pro 5400s	Loyd Star Pro	120/180/240/360/480/1000	16 nm TLC	SATA 6 Gbit/s	M.2/2.5"	Silicon Motion SM2256	560/400-560/480	60/50-78/85	March 2016	Endurance: 20 GB WPD
600p	Pleasant Star	128/256/512/1024	32-Layer 3D TLC	PCIe 3.0 x4 NVMe	M.2	Silicon Motion SM2260	1800/560	155/128	August 2016	Endurance: 72 TB to 576 TB, Power Active Average: 0.1W
Pro 6000p	Pleasant Star	128/256/360/512/1024	32-Layer 3D TLC	PCIe 3.0 x4 NVMe	M.2	Silicon Motion SM2260	1800/560	155/128	August 2016	Endurance: 72 TB to 576 TB, Power Active Average: 0.1W
DC S3110	Liberty Harbor DC	128/256/512	64-Layer 3D TLC	SATA 6 Gbit/s	M.2/2.5"		550/140-550/450	55/1.2-75/8.5	November 2017	Endurance: 72 TB to 288 TB, Power Active Average: 2.1W to 3.4W
DC S3100	Loyd Star	180/240/480/1000	16 nm TLC	SATA 6 Gbit/s	2.5"		510/81-501/114	50.4/2.9-59/3.9	March 2016	Endurance: 72 TB, Power Active Average: 2.5W to 4.9W
DC P3100	Pleasant Star	128/256/512/1024	32-Layer 3D TLC	PCIe 3.0 x4 NVMe	M.2	Silicon Motion SM2260	1800/175	114/10	October 2016	Endurance: 72 TB to 580 TB, Power Active Average: 3.25W to 5.3W
DC P3320	Pleasantdale Refresh Lite	450/1200/2000	32-Layer 3D TLC	PCIe 3.0 x4 NVMe 1.0	2.5" with U.2 connector/AIC with PCIe x4 connector		1100/500-1600/1400	130/17-365/22	March 2016	Endurance: 0.3 DWPD/350 TB to 1490 TB, Power Active Average: 12W to 20W
DC P3520	Pleasantdale	450/1200/2000	3D1 MLC	PCIe 3.0 x4 NVMe 1.0	2.5" with U.2 connector/AIC with PCIe x4 connector	Intel CH29AE41AB1	1200/600-1700/1350	145/19-375/26	August 2016	Endurance: 0.7 DWPD for 5 yrs. / 2.49 PBW (2 TB)
DC S3520	Downieville	150/240/480/800/760/960/1200/1600	16 nm 32-Layer 3D MLC	SATA 6 Gbit/s	M.2/2.5"		170/140-450/380	67.5/17.0	August 2016	Endurance: 1 DWPD/412 TB to 2925 TB, Power Active Average: 2W to 3.5W
DC S3320	Oroville	150/240/480/800/960/1200/1600	32-Layer 3D MLC	SATA 6 Gbit/s	2.5"		180/165-450/380	67.5/17.0	February 2017	Endurance: 0.20PB to 1.49PB, Power Active Average: 2.2W to 3.5W
DC D3600(D for Dual Port)	Elkdale	1024/2048	20 nm MLC-HET	Dual Port(PCIe 3.0 x4 split into Two PCIe 3.0 x2) NVMe 1.2	2.5" with U.2 connector	Intel	2100/1500	470/30	March 2016	Endurance: 3 DWPD/5.475PB to 10.95PB, Power Active Average: 25W
DC D3700(D for Dual Port)	Elkdale	800/1600	20 nm MLC-HET	Dual Port(PCIe 3.0 x4 split into Two PCIe 3.0 x2) NVMe 1.2	2.5" with U.2 connector	Intel	1900/1500	470/95	March 2016	Endurance: 10 DWPD/14.6PB to 29.2PB, Power Active Average: 25W
DC P4800X	Cold Stream	375/750	20 nm 3D XPoint	PCIe 3.0 x4	2.5" with U.2 connector/AIC with PCIe x4 connector	Intel SLL3D EAT39099	2500/2200	550/550	March 2017	Endurance: 30 DWPD/12.3PB to 41PB, Power Active Average: 18W
DC D4800X	Cold Stream	375/750/1500	3D XPoint	PCIe 3.0 NVMe	2.5" with U.2 15mm	Intel	2400/2400	560/540	April 2019	Endurance: 30 DWPD/20.5PB to 82.1PB, Power Active Average: 20W to 25W
DC P4801X	Cold Stream	100/200/375	3D XPoint	PCIe 3.0 x4	M.2/2.5" with U.2 connector	Intel	2300/1000-2500/2200	550/250-550/550	September 2018	Endurance: 60 DWPD/10.9PB to 41PB, Power Active Average: 7W to 11W
545s	Liberty Harbor	128/256/512	64-Layer 3D TLC	SATA 6 Gbit/s	M.2/2.5"	Silicon Motion SM2259	550/500	75/90	June 2017	Endurance: 144 TB to 288 TB, Power Active Average: 4.5W
DC P4500	Cliffdale	1000/2000/4000/8000	32-Layer 3D1 TLC	PCIe 3.1 x4 NVMe	2.5" 15 mm / Ruller / HHHL (CEM3.0)	Intel	3200/600 3200/1900 3200/1875	279.5/30.5 640.2/65.5 605/53	May 2017/February 2018	Endurance: 0.7 DWPD/1.38PB to 7.2PB, Power Active Average: 11W to 20.5W
DC P4501	Cliffdale	500/1000/2000/4000	32-Layer 3D1 TLC	PCIe 3.1 x4 NVMe	M.2 22110, 2.5" 7 mm	Intel	2500/300-3100/860	146/15.3-361/46.7	May 2017	Endurance: 1 DWPD/0.65PB to 5PB, Power Active Average: 6W to 12.5W
Pro 5450s	Liberty Harbor	256/512	64-Layer 3D TLC	SATA 6 Gbit/s	M.2/2.5"	Silicon Motion SM2259	550/500	75/90	August 2017	Endurance: 144 TB to 288 TB, Power Active Average: 4.5W
DC S4500	Youngsville	240/480/960/1920/3840	3D1 TLC	SATA 6 Gbit/s	2.5" 7 mm	Intel SLM5B	500/470-190	72-69/33-16	August 2017	Endurance: 1 DWPD/0.62PB to 7.64PB, Power Active Average: 2.6W to 5.6W
DC S4600	Youngsville	240/480/960/1920	3D1 TLC	SATA 6 Gbit/s	2.5" 7 mm	Intel	500/480-260	72/65-38	August 2017	Endurance: 3 DWPD/1.40PB to 10.84PB, Power Active Average: 3.1W to 5.0W
DC P4608	Cliffdale	6400	3D TLC	PCIe 3.0 x8 NVMe	HHHL (CEM3.0)	Intel	6200/3500	1308.5/464	Q3 2017	Endurance: 35.14PB, Power Active Average: 43W
900p	Mansion Beach	280/480	20 nm 128Gb 3D XPoint	PCIe 3.0 x4 NVMe	HHHL Add-in card, U.2	Intel SLL3D EAU01D76	2500/2000	550/500	October 2017	Endurance: 5.11PB to 8.76 PB Written, Power Active Average: 14W
760p	Harris Harbor	128/256/512/1024/2048	64-Layer 3D TLC	PCIe 3.1 x4 NVMe	M.2	Silicon Motion SM2262	3230/1625	340/275	January 2018	Endurance: 72 TB to 288 TB, Power Active Average: 0.05W
Pro 7600p	Harris Harbor	128/256/512/1024/2048	64-Layer 3D TLC	PCIe 3.1 x4 NVMe	M.2	Silicon Motion SM2262	3230/1625	340/275	January 2018	Endurance: 72 TB to 576 TB, Power Active Average: 0.05W
800p	Brighton Beach	58/118	20 nm 3D XPoint	PCIe 3.0 x2 NVMe 1.1	U.2 connector/AIC with PCIe x2 connector	AHU19W23	1450/640	250/145	March 2018	Endurance: 365 TB, Power Active Average: 3.75W
DC P4510	Cliffdale Refresh	1000/2000/4000/8000	64-Layer 3D2 TLC	PCIe 3.1 x4 NVMe 1.2	U.2 15 mm / 2.5"	Intel	3200/3000	641.8/134.5	November 2017	Endurance: up to 1 DWPD/1.92PBW to 13.88PBW, Power Active Average: 16W
DC P4600	Cliffdale	1600/2000/3200/4000/6400	32-Layer 3D1 TLC	PCIe 3.1 x4 NVMe	U.2 15 mm / HHHL (CEM3.0)	Intel	3200/2100	617.5/238	May 2017	Endurance: 2.9 DWPD/8.99PBW to 37.38PBW, Power Active Average: 20.7W
905p	Mansion Beach	380/480/960	20 nm 3D XPoint	PCIe 3.0 x4	2.5" with U.2 connector/AIC with PCIe x4 connector/M.2 22110	Intel SLM58	2600/2200	575/550	May 2018	Endurance: 10 DWPD/5.11PB to 17.52PB, Power Active Average: 16.4W
DC P4511	Cliffdale Refresh	1000/2000	64-Layer 3D2 TLC	PCIe 3.1 x4 NVMe 1.2	M.2 22110	Intel	2000/1430	295/36	Jun 2018	Endurance: 0.98PBW to 1.95PBW, Power Active Average: 8.25W
DC P4610	Cliffdale Refresh	1600/3200/6400/7680	64-Layer 3D2 TLC	PCIe 3.1 x4 NVMe 1.2	U.2 15 mm	Intel	3200/3200	651/219	June 2018	Endurance: 3 DWPD/12.25PBW to 44.25PBW, Power Active Average: 15W
660p	Neptune Harbor	512/1024/2048	64-Layer 3D QLC	PCIe 3.0 x4 NVMe	M.2	Silicon Motion SMI2263	1800/1800	220/220	August 2018	Endurance: 0.11 DWPD/100 TB to 400 TB, Power Active Average: 0.1W
D3-S4510	Youngsville Refresh	240/480/960/1920/3840/7680	64-Layer 3D2 TLC	SATA 6 Gbit/s	2.5" 7 mm	Intel	560/510-280	90-97 / 16-36	August 2018	Endurance: up to 2 DWPD/0.9 to 12.3 PBW, Power Active Average: 3.6W
D3-S4610	Youngsville Refresh	240/480/960/1920/3840/7680	64-Layer 3D2 TLC	SATA 6 Gbit/s	2.5" 7 mm	Intel	560/510-320	96/42-28	August 2018	Endurance: 3 DWPD/1.6 to 23.9 PBW, Power Active Average: 3.7W
DC P4101	Harris Harbor	128/256/512/1024/2048	64-Layer 3D2 TLC	PCIe 3.1 x4 NVMe	M.2		1150/140 2200/280 2250/550 2600/660 2600/840	60/2.2 125/5.7 219/11.4 275/16	Q3 2018	Endurance: up to 0.5 DWPD, Power Active Average: 6.4W
665p	Neptune Harbor Refresh	1024/2048	96-Layer 3D3 QLC	PCIe 3.0 x4 NVMe	M.2	Silicon Motion SMI2263	2000/2000	250/250	November 2019	Endurance: 0.16 DWPD/300 TB to 600 TB, Power Active Average: 0.1W
D7-P5500	Arbordale Plus	1920/3840/7680	96-Layer 3D TLC	PCIe 4.0 x4 NVMe 1.3c	U.2 2.5" 15mm	Intel	7000/4300	1000/130	Jun 2020	Endurance: 1 DWPD/3.5PBW to 14.0PBW, Power Active Average: 20W
D7-P5600	Arbordale Plus	1600/3200/6400	96-Layer 3D TLC	PCIe 4.0 x4 NVMe 1.3c	U.2 2.5" 15mm	Intel	7000/4300	1000/260	Jun 2020	Endurance: 3 DWPD/8.8PBW to 35.0PBW, Power Active Average: 20W
D5-P4320	Cliffdale Refresh	7680	64-Layer 3D QLC	PCIe 3.1 x4 NVMe	U.2 2.5" 15mm	Intel	3200/1000	427/36	August 2018	Endurance: 0.2 to 0.9 DWPD/2.8PB(random) to 12.3PB(sequential), Power Active Average: 15W
670p	Keystone Harbor	512/1024/2048	144-Layer 3D4 QLC	PCIe 3.0 x4 NVMe	M.2	Silicon Motion SMI2265	3000/1600 3500/2500 3500/2700		March 2021	Endurance: 0.16 DWPD/300 TB to 600 TB, Power Active Average: 0.1W
DC P5800X	Alder Stream	400/800/1600/3200	4-layer 3D XPoint	PCIe 4.0 x4 NVMe	2.5" 15mm	Intel	7200/4800	1500/1150	Q4 2020	Endurance: 100 DWPD
DC P1600X	Emerald Rapids	58/118	4-layer 3D XPoint	PCIe 3.0 x4 NVMe	M.2	Intel	1760/1050	410/243	Q2 2021	Endurance: 1292 TBW
DC P5801X	Alder Stream	400/800	4-layer 3D XPoint	PCIe 4.0 x4 NVMe	E1.S 15mm	Intel	7200/4800	1480/1100	Q4 2022	Endurance: 100 DWPD
DC P5810X	Alder Stream	400/800	4-layer 3D XPoint	PCIe 4.0 x4 NVMe	2.5" 15mm	Intel	7200/6000	1500/1380	Q4 2022	Endurance: 100 DWPD
DC P5820X		400/800/1600	4-layer 3D XPoint	PCIe 4.0 x4 NVMe	2.5" 15mm	Intel				
Model	Codename	Capacities (GB)	Memory type	Interface	Form factor	Controller	Seq. read/write MB/s	Rnd 4 KB read/write IOPS (K)	Introduced	Comment / Source
