= USS Eastern Shore =

Japanese-built cargo steamship

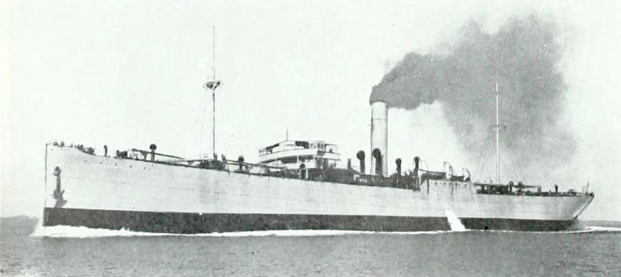
- Eastern Shore at sea

History

United States
- Name: Eastern Shore
- Owner: US Shipping Board
- Operator: 1918–19: US Navy
- Port of registry: Seattle
- Builder: Harima Dockyard Co, Harima
- Laid down: 5 February 1918
- Launched: 12 August 1918
- Completed: September 1918
- Acquired: for US Navy: 1 Dec 1918
- Commissioned: into US Navy: 1 Dec 1918
- Decommissioned: from US Navy: 27 May 1919
- Identification: US official number 217291; 1918–19: ID number ID–3500; until 1933: code letters LPBG
- Fate: scrapped 1935

General characteristics
- Type: cargo ship
- Tonnage: 6,731 GRT, 5,134 NRT, 11,000 DWT
- Displacement: 14,606 tons
- Length: 425.0 ft (129.5 m)
- Beam: 53.6 ft (16.3 m)
- Draft: 28 ft 7 in (8.7 m)
- Depth: 37.6 ft (11.5 m)
- Decks: 2
- Installed power: 547 NHP, 3,500 ihp
- Propulsion: 1 × triple-expansion engine; 1 × screw
- Speed: 11.7 knots (22 km/h)
- Complement: in US Navy: 60
- Sensors & processing systems: submarine signalling
- Notes: sister ship: Eastern Soldier

USS Eastern Shore (ID-3500) was a cargo steamship that was built in Japan in 1918 for the United States Shipping Board (USSB). From December 1918 to May 1919 she spent six months in the United States Navy. She was scrapped in 1935.

== Building ==
The Harima Dockyard Company in Harima built a small number of cargo ships for the USSB. Eastern Shore was laid down on 5 February 1918, launched on 12 August, and completed that September. Harima completed a sister ship to similar measurements, Eastern Soldier, in June 1920.

Eastern Shore's registered length was 425.0 ft (129.5 m), her beam was 53.6 ft (16.3 m), her depth was 37.6 ft (11.5 m) and her draft was 28 ft 7 in (8.7 m). Her tonnages were 6,731 GRT, 5,134 NRT, 11,000 DWT, and 14,606 tons displacement.

Eastern Shore had a single screw, driven by a three-cylinder triple-expansion engine built by Kobe Steel Works. It was rated at 547 NHP or 3,500 ihp, and gave her a speed of 11.7 knots (22 km/h).

== Eastern Shore ==
On 20 October 1918 Eastern Shore was delivered at Seattle, which was also where she was registered. Her US official number was 217291 and her code letters were LPBG.

She was converted at Puget Sound Naval Shipyard for naval use, and on 1 December 1918 she was transferred to the US Navy. She was commissioned the same day as USS Eastern Shore, with the Naval Registry Identification Number ID–3500.

Eastern Shore loaded flour at Seattle, and left Puget Sound on 2 January 1919. From 29 January to 10 February she was in New York for repairs. She then crossed the North Atlantic under the orders of the United States Food Administration. She called at Gibraltar for orders, and then continued to Constanța in Romania. Her cargo was discharged into barges to be taken up the Danube to relieve a food shortage in Central Europe.

She left Constanța on 10 April, called at Gibraltar, and reached New York on 18 May. She her discharged cargo and ballast, and disembarked one passenger: an envoy from the government of Bulgaria. The ship was decommissioned on 27 May 1919, and returned to the USSB the same day.

There is a lack of evidence that Eastern Shore saw merchant service after she was decommissioned. The USSB sold some of its ships, and appointed shipping companies to manage others, but Lloyd's Register records no such management or change of ownership for Eastern Shore. In 1934, four-letter wireless telegraph call signs superseded code letters, but none is recorded for Eastern Shore. This suggests that she may have been laid up in the USSB's reserve fleet.

Eastern Shore was scrapped at Baltimore in 1935. However, Lloyd's Register continued to list her until 1952.

== Verse ==
A poem published in The American Marine Engineer in March 1919 made fun of Eastern Shore's arrival in Puget Sound in late 1918. Called "What the Slipping Board Slipped onto us", it included the stanzas

The dynamos wandered around down below,
There was nothing to hold the things fast;
The winches paraded around the main deck,
Some tried to climb the main mast.

and

For two days we wandered around Puget Sound,
Humiliating the scenery there;
And on the third morning, without any warning,
The engines went up in the air.

The poem ended with the "Chief" (i.e. Chief Engineer) cursing "The man who designed this damned nautical crime". The poem's wry observations on Eastern Shore's build quality may be borne out by the fact that, when only four months old, she had to stop for 12 days for repairs.

== Bibliography ==
- Anonymous (1919). "What the Slipping Board Slipped onto us". The American Marine Engineer. 14 (March 1919) – via HathiTrust.
- Lloyd's Register of Shipping. Vol. II.–Steamers. London: Lloyd's Register of Shipping. 1919 – via Internet Archive.
- Lloyd's Register of Shipping. Vol. II.–Steamers. London: Lloyd's Register of Shipping. 1921 – via Internet Archive.
- Lloyd's Register of Shipping (PDF). Vol. II.–Steamers and Motorships of 300 tons gross and over. London: Lloyd's Register of Shipping. 1934 – via Southampton City Council.
- Register Book. Vol. I A–L. London: Lloyd's Register of Shipping. 1952 – via Internet Archive.
- "Suzuki Shipyards and Steel Works". Pacific Marine Review. 17 (7). San Francisco: JS Hines. July 1920 – via Internet Archive.
