= X25-M =

Line of SSDs by Intel

Intel X-25-M SSD (an early developer sample as shown in its label)

Intel X25-M (M for main) is a discontinued line of Serial ATA interface solid-state drives (or SSDs) developed by Intel for personal computers, announced in Q4 2008. The SSD was a multi-level-cell solid-state drive available in a 2.5" form factor, came in 80 GB and 160 GB capacities and utilized NAND flash memory on a 50 nm process. The second-generation SSD which was called the "X25-M G2". The X25-M G2 was also available in a 2.5" form factor and 80 GB and 160 GB capacities, but with NAND flash memory on a more efficient 34 nm process.

== Overview ==
Around mid-2008, rumors and various leaks about a possible mainstream affordable SSD released by Intel surfaced. A couple weeks after, Intel indirectly confirmed the rumors by releasing a promotional video. Intel then released its X25 series of SSDs which consisted of three different drives: The X25-V, X25-M, and X25-E. The X25-V means value, and it uses a cheaper MLC NAND alongside a slower controller. While the X25-E is the exterme edition, which only comes in 32GB or 64GB of storage but uses Intel's SLC NAND instead of MLC. The X25-M, meaning main edition, was released in an 80 GB capacity with 50 nm NAND flash memory in a 2.5" form factor. The 160 GB capacity version came out several months after. Intel then released a 34 nm flash memory version in mid-2009. Because Intel used the same exact name for these new drives, the consumers nicknamed the 34 nm SSDs as the "X25-M G2".

== Features ==
Intel X25-E SATA SSD (uses SLC instead of MLC)

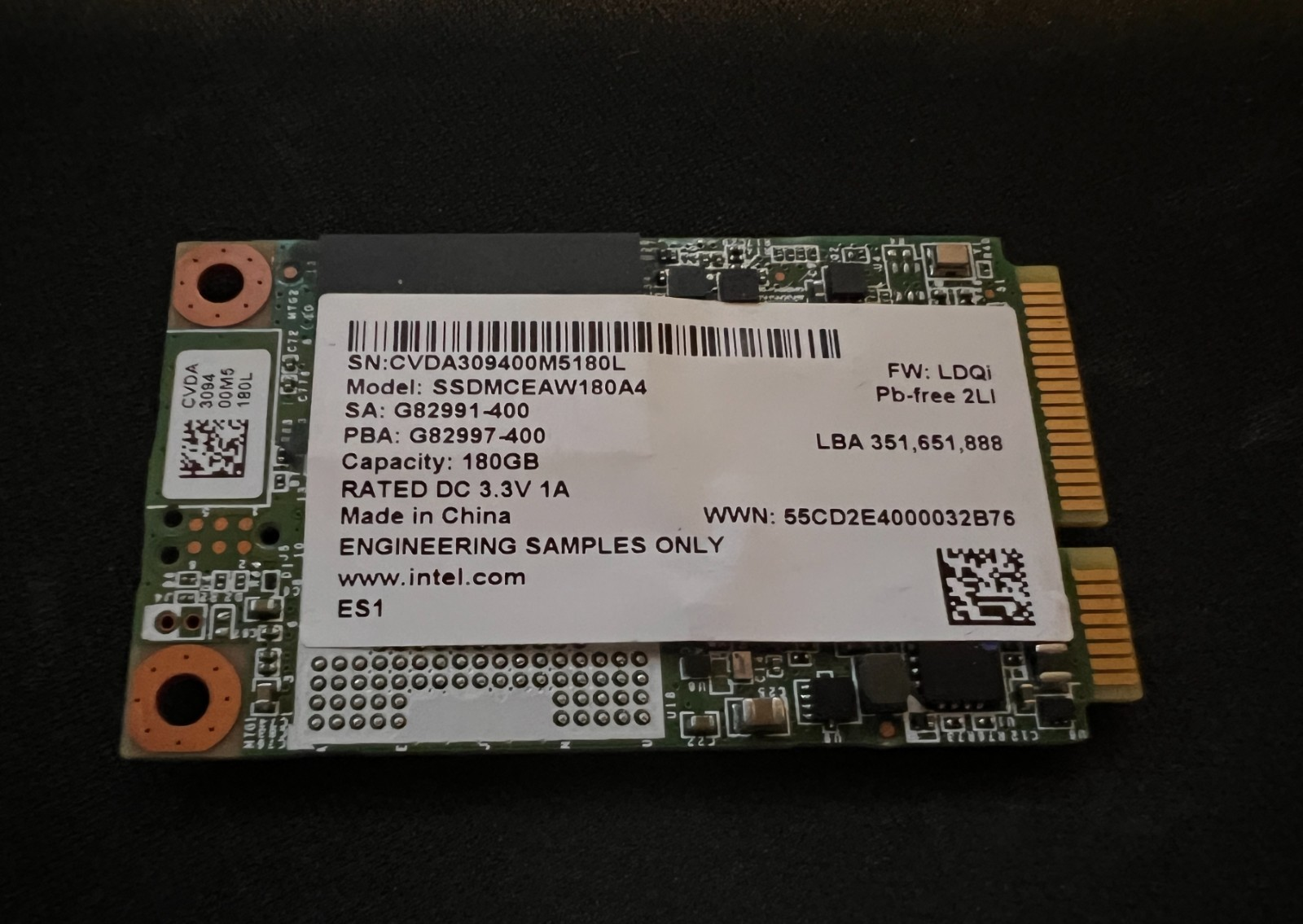
Intel MLC-based mSATA SSD

Before the X25-M was released, all of the multi-level cell (MLC) drives were the same piece of hardware, but with a different company logo on it. This is called rebranding, which happens often in the computer hardware market, but Intel opted to develop its own MLC drive. The most notable feature about the X25-M is how well it performed in comparison to other MLC and single-level cell (SLC) SSDs. SLC drives are naturally more efficient than MLC drives, however Intel's unique architecture for this MLC drive was much more efficient than the typical MLC drive.

To prevent data loss, Intel included additional 7.5–8% more space (6–6.4 GB on an 80 GB drive), specifically for reliability purposes. If it ran out of good blocks to write (nearing the end of the drive's lifespan), the SSD will write to this additional space on the drive.

=== TRIM support ===
X25-M G2 Trim command support was released for Windows 7. Trim support gives the SSD the ability to take the memory that is marked to be deleted to erased immediately. This gives the drive more space to reuse, and reduces performance loss over time. The firmware also increased overall sequential write times of the 160 GB X25-M G2, though not of the 80 GB version. This increased the maximum write speed of 70 MB/s to 100 MB/s.

Intel refused to release any trim-supporting firmware for the first generation X25-M. According to discussions tech journalist Anand Lal Shimpi with Intel "this isn’t a technical limitation of the drives, but rather something Intel is choosing to enable only on the 34nm products" to pressure users to upgrade.

=== Bugs ===
Two bugs with the firmware on the X25-M G2 were fixed:

The first bug had complications with a BIOS HDD password. A BIOS HDD password is used to reduce functionality of the computer unless the user inputs the correct password. The problem was that certain X25-M G2 drives that shipped with the bugged (02G2) firmware gave difficulty to any users that used a BIOS HDD password. This means that users who bought the drive with this firmware had to do the following until the next firmware update: should not set a BIOS HDD password, change or disable the BIOS password.

In Q4 2009, Intel released firmware that incorporated Trim support that further increased the speeds of the drive. However, when users upgraded to this firmware, there was a chance the firmware would instead just brick the drive.

=== Specifications ===
The Intel X25-M G2 specifications:

- Capacity 80 GB, 120 GB and 160 GB
- NAND flash components Intel multi-level cell (MLC) NAND flash memory
- 10 parallel channel architecture with 34 nm MLC ONFI 1.0 NAND
- Bandwidth sustained sequential read: up to 250 MB/s
- Sustained sequential write: up to 70 MB/s (80 GB drive) and up to 100 MB/s (160 GB drive)
- Read latency: 65 μs
- Write latency: 85 μs
- Random 4 KB reads: up to 35,000 IOPS
- Random 4 KB writes: 80 GB X25/X18-M – up to 6,600 IOPS
- Random 4 KB writes: 160 GB X25/X18-M – up to 8,600 IOPS
- Interface SATA 1.5 Gbit/s and 3.0 Gbit/s
- 2.5" industry standard hard drive form factor
- Compatibility SATA revision 2.6 compliant. Compatible with SATA 3 Gbit/s with Native Command Queuing and SATA 1.5 Gbit/s interface rates
- Life expectancy 1.2 million hours (MTBF)
- Power consumption active: 150 mW typical
- Idle (DIPM): 75 mW typical
- Operating shock 1,500 G/0.5 ms
- Operating temperature 0 °C to +70 °C
